= 2021 Illawarra Rugby League season =

== Presidents Cup (Southern Conference) ==
2021 NSWRL Presidents Cup
- Duration: 10 April – 29 August
- Teams: 5
- Broadcast partners: Bar TV Sports

=== Teams ===
Colours	Club	Home Ground(s)	Head Coach(s)
	Collegians Red Dogs	Collegians Sports Complex	Nathan Fein
	Corrimal Cougars	Ziems Park	Sean Maloney
	Dapto Canaries	Groundz Precinct	Chris Liekvoll Adam Blake
	Thirroul Butchers	Gibson Park	Jarrod Costello
	Western Suburbs Red Devils	Sid Parrish Park	Peter McLeod

=== Ladder ===
The ladder below reflects the 9 out of scheduled 15 rounds that were completed prior to the suspension and subsequent cancellation of the competition. The cause was lockdown measures used to combat the delta variant of the COVID-19 pandemic in New South Wales. Originally scheduled for 8 May 2021, Round 5 was washed out and postponed until 24 July 2021, however, due to the lockdown the round was not played.

Pos	Team	Pld	W	D	L	B	PF	PA	PD	Pts
1	Thirroul Butchers	8	7	0	1	1	200	100	100	16
2	Collegians Red Dogs	7	5	0	2	2	242	133	109	14
3	Western Suburbs Red Devils	7	4	0	3	2	216	122	94	12
4	Corrimal Cougars	7	2	0	5	2	110	206	-96	8
5	Dapto Canaries	7	0	0	7	2	91	298	-207	4

=== Regular season ===
==== Round 1 ====
Home	Score	Away	Match Information		
Home	Score	Away	Date and Time	Venue	Referee
Dapto Canaries	16 – 46	Thirroul Butchers	Saturday, 10 April, 15:00	Groundz Precinct	W. Damato
Collegians Red Dogs	24 – 22	Western Suburbs Red Devils	Saturday, 10 April, 15:00	Collegians Sports Complex	R. Jackson
Bye: Corrimal Cougars

==== Round 2 ====
Home	Score	Away	Match Information		
Home	Score	Away	Date and Time	Venue	Referee
Thirroul Butchers	22 – 0	Corrimal Cougars	Saturday, 17 April, 15:00	Gibson Park	
Dapto Canaries	0 – 58	Collegians Red Dogs	Saturday, 17 April, 15:00	Groundz Precinct	
Bye: Western Suburbs Red Devils

April 24
Collegians Red Dogs 26 beat Thirroul Butchers 14 at Gibson Park on Saturday, 24 April 2021.
Wests Devils 42 beat Corrimal Cougars 42-22 on Saturday, 24 April 2021.
Dapto Canaries had the bye.

May 1
Corrimal Cougars 24 beat Dapto Canaries 16 at Ziems Park on Saturday, 1 May 2021.
Thirroul Butchers beat Wests Devils at Parrish Park on Saturday, 1 May 2021.
Collegians Red Dogs had the bye.

May 8
Corrimal Cougars versus Collegians Red Dogs at Ziems Park on Saturday, 8 May 2021 was washed out.
Dapto Canaries versus Wests Devils was also abandoned, the two games were rescheduled to be played on July 24.
Thirroul Butchers had the bye.

May 15-16 Representative Weekend
Open Age Men: Newcastle Rebels 36 beat Illawarra Steelers 4 at Collegians Sporting Complex on Sunday, 16 May 2021.
Under 20s Men : Newcastle Rebels 26 beat Illawarra Steelers 22 at Collegians Sporting Complex on Sunday, 16 May 2021.

May 22
Wests Devils 40 beat Collegians Red Dogs 16 at Parrish Park on Saturday, 22 May 2021.
Thirroul Butchers 32 beat Dapto Canaries 12 at Gibson Park on Saturday, 22 May 2021.
Corrimal Cougars had the bye.

May 29
Thirroul Butchers 24 beat Corrimal Cougars 14 on Saturday, 29 May 2021.
Collegians Red Dogs 62 beat Dapto Canaries 10 on Saturday, 29 May 2021.
Wests Devils had the bye.

June 5
Thirroul Butchers 26 neat Collegians Red Dogs 18 on Saturday, 5 June 2021.
Wests Devils 42 beat Corrimal Cougars 16 on Saturday, 5 June 2021.
Dapto Canaries had the bye.

June 12
There were no games scheduled on this long weekend.

June 19
Thirroul Butchers 16 beat Wests Devils 2 at Gibson Park on Saturday, 19 June 2021.
Corrimal Cougars 22 beat Dapto Canaries 20 at Groundz Precinct on Saturday, 19 June 3021.
Collegians Red Dogs had the bye.

June 26
Collegians Red Dogs beat Corrimal Cougars at Collegians Sports Centre on Saturday, 26 June 2021.
Wests Devils 54 beat Dapto 8 at Parrish Park on Saturday, 26 June 2021.
Thirroul Butchers had the bye.

== 1st Division ==
2021 Illawarra Rugby League 1st Division
- Duration: 10 April –
- Teams: 7
- Broadcast partners: Bar TV Sports

=== Teams ===
Colours	Club	Home Ground(s)	Head Coach(s)	2020 Position
	Avondale Greyhounds	Dandaloo Sportsground	Nathan Roach Michael Princic	2nd (Runner-ups)
	Collegians Red Dogs	Collegians Sports Complex	Andrew Bray	N/A
	Corrimal Cougars	Ziems Park		3rd
	Dapto Canaries	Groundz Precinct	Dean Grey	6th
	Helensburgh Tigers	Rex Jackson Oval	Chris Coleman	5th
	Thirroul Butchers	Gibson Park	Aaron Beath	1st (Premiers)
	Western Suburbs Red Devils	Sid Parrish Park	Drew Ferns	4th

=== Ladder ===
Pos	Team	Pld	W	D	L	B	PF	PA	PD	Pts
1	Western Suburbs Red Devils	1	1	0	0	0	16	10	+6	2
2	Thirroul Butchers	1	1	0	0	0	14	10	+4	2
3	Helensburgh Tigers	1	1	0	0	0	18	16	+2	2
4	Corrimal Cougars	0	0	0	0	1	0	0	0	2
5	Avondale Greyhounds	1	0	0	1	0	16	18	-2	0
6	Dapto Canaries	1	0	0	1	0	10	14	-4	0
7	Collegians Red Dogs	1	0	0	1	0	10	16	-6	0

=== Regular season ===
==== Round 1 ====
Home	Score	Away	Match Information		
Home	Score	Away	Date and Time	Venue	Referee
Dapto Canaries	10 – 14	Thirroul Butchers	Saturday, 10 April, 13:30	Groundz Precinct	M. Reeves
Collegians Red Dogs	10 – 16	Western Suburbs Red Devils	Saturday, 10 April, 13:30	Collegians Sports Complex	J. Framke
Helensburgh Tigers	18 – 16	Avondale Greyhounds	Saturday, 10 April, 15:00	Rex Jackson Oval	B. Sigmond
Bye: Corrimal Cougars

==== Round 2 ====
Home	Score	Away	Match Information		
Home	Score	Away	Date and Time	Venue	Referee
Corrimal Cougars	–	Thirroul Butchers	Friday, 16 April, 20:00	Ziems Park	
Dapto Canaries	–	Collegians Red Dogs	Saturday, 17 April, 13:30	Groundz Precinct	
Avondale Greyhounds	–	Western Suburbs Red Devils	Saturday, 17 April, 16:00	Dandaloo Sportsground	
Bye: Helensburgh Tigers

== 2nd Division ==
2021 Illawarra Rugby League 2nd Division Shield
- Duration: 10 April –
- Teams: 7
- Broadcast partners: Bar TV Sports

=== Teams ===
Colours	Club	Home Ground(s)	Head Coach(s)	2020 Position
	Avondale Greyhounds	Dandaloo Sportsground	George Webb Josh Kent	4th
	Berkeley Eagles	Berkeley Sports Club		N/A
	Figtree Crushers	Figtree High School	Glenn Carlson	2nd (Premiers)
	Helensburgh Tigers	Rex Jackson Oval	John Piper	3rd
	Mt. Kembla Lowries	Mt Kembla Park	John Freebairn Rod Broad	N/A
.	Northern Suburbs Bulldogs	Jim Allen Oval	Ellis Hurworth	N/A
	Windang Sharks	Boronia Park	Darrin Gee Luke Jones	5th

=== Ladder ===
Pos	Team	Pld	W	D	L	B	PF	PA	PD	Pts
1	Avondale Greyhounds	1	1	0	0	0	34	6	+28	2
2	Figtree Crushers	1	1	0	0	0	28	6	+22	2
3	Mt. Kembla Lowries	1	1	0	0	0	20	16	+4	2
4	Berkeley Eagles	0	0	0	0	1	0	0	0	2
5	Windang Sharks	1	0	0	1	0	16	20	-4	0
6	Northern Suburbs Bulldogs	1	0	0	1	0	6	28	-22	0
7	Helensburgh Tigers	1	0	0	1	0	6	34	-28	0

=== Regular season ===
==== Round 1 ====
Home	Score	Away	Match Information		
Home	Score	Away	Date and Time	Venue	Referee
Helensburgh Tigers	6 – 34	Avondale Greyhounds	Saturday, 10 April, 12:00	Rex Jackson Oval	W. Cambourn
Northern Suburbs Bulldogs	6 – 28	Figtree Crushers	Saturday, 10 April, 15:00	Jim Allen Oval	L. Volpato
Windang Sharks	16 – 20	Mt. Kembla Lowries	Saturday, 10 April, 15:00	Boronia Park	A. Riolo
Bye: Berkeley Eagles

==== Round 2 ====
Home	Score	Away	Match Information		
Home	Score	Away	Date and Time	Venue	Referee
Avondale Greyhounds	–	Mt. Kembla Lowries	Saturday, 17 April, 14:30	Dandaloo Sportsground	
Figtree Crushers	–	Helensburgh Tigers	Saturday, 17 April, 15:00	Figtree High School	
Berkeley Eagles	–	Windang Sharks	Saturday, 17 April, 15:00	Berkeley Sports Club	
Bye: Northern Suburbs Bulldogs

== Under-18's ==
2021 Illawarra Rugby League Under-18's
- Duration: 10 April –
- Teams: 6
- Broadcast partners: Bar TV Sports

=== Teams ===
Colours	Club	Home Ground(s)	Head Coach(s)	2020 Position
	Collegians Red Dogs	Collegians Sports Complex	Peter Hooper	N/A
	Corrimal Cougars Red	Ziems Park		4th
	Corrimal Cougars Green	Ziems Park		4th
	Dapto Canaries	Groundz Precinct	Dean Callaway	2nd (Runner-ups)
	Thirroul Butchers	Gibson Park	Ben Couchman	3rd
	Western Suburbs Red Devils	Sid Parrish Park	Josh White	1st (Premiers)

=== Ladder ===
Pos	Team	Pld	W	D	L	B	PF	PA	PD	Pts
1	Collegians Red Dogs	1	1	0	0	0	60	6	+54	0
2	Dapto Canaries	1	1	0	0	0	30	14	+16	0
3	Corrimal Cougars Red	0	0	0	0	0	0	0	0	0
4	Corrimal Cougars Green	0	0	0	0	0	0	0	0	0
5	Thirroul Butchers	1	0	0	1	0	14	30	-16	2
6	Western Suburbs Red Devils	1	0	0	1	0	6	60	-54	2

=== Regular season ===
==== Round 1 ====
Home	Score	Away	Match Information		
Home	Score	Away	Date and Time	Venue	Referee
Dapto Canaries	30 – 14	Thirroul Butchers	Saturday, 10 April, 12:00	Groundz Precinct	A. Brooks
Collegians Red Dogs	60 – 6	Western Suburbs Red Devils	Saturday, 10 April, 12:00	Collegians Sports Complex	J. Framke

==== Round 2 ====
Home	Score	Away	Match Information		
Home	Score	Away	Date and Time	Venue	Referee
Corrimal Cougars Green	–	Western Suburbs Red Devils	Friday, 16 April, 18:30	Ziems Park	
Dapto Canaries	–	Collegians Red Dogs	Saturday, 17 April, 12:00	Groundz Precinct	
Thirroul Butchers	–	Corrimal Cougars Red	Saturday, 17 April, 13:30	Gibson Park	

== Teams in Recent Seasons ==
Due to the COVID-19 pandemic in Australia the commencement of Illawarra 2020 season was postponed. Due to financial considerations, Collegians decided not to field senior teams and the IRL took a decision NOT to run a First Grade competition in 2020.

Three clubs – Helensburgh, Thirroul and Wests – elected to enter their highest grade team in NSWRL competitions. Delayed and restructured, IRL competition matches began on 25 July 2020.

The following table lists the clubs and the teams they fielded in the 2019 and 2020 senior competitions: 1st Grade, Reserve Grade (2nd), Division 2 (Div2), Under 18s (U18), Women's tackle (Wom), Women's Under 18 (WU18), Ladies League Tag (LLT), Open Age, NSWRL President's Cup (PC) and Sydney Shield (SS).

Club	First Season	2019 Season							2020 Season								2021 Season							
Club	First Season	1st	2nd	Div2	U18	Wom	WU18	LLT	NSW	Open	Div2	U18	Wom	WU18	LLT	Jnr	NSW PC	Div1	Div2	U18	Wom	WU18	LLT	Jnr
Berkeley Eagles	1955	Yes	Yes			Yes	Yes									Yes			Yes				Yes	Yes
Collegians Red Dogs	1933	Yes	Yes		Yes			Yes								Yes	Yes	Yes		Yes				Yes
Corrimal Cougars	1912	Yes	Yes			Yes	Yes			Yes		Yes	Yes	Yes		Yes	Yes	Yes		Two	Yes			Yes
Dapto Canaries	1911	Yes	Yes		Yes					Yes		Yes		Yes	Yes	Yes	Yes	Yes		Yes	Yes		Yes	Yes
Helensburgh Tigers	1911	Yes	Yes		Yes	Yes	Yes		SS	Yes	Yes		Yes		Yes	Yes		Yes	Yes		NSW		Two	Yes
Thirroul Butchers	1913	Yes	Yes		Yes			Two	PC	Yes		Yes			Two	Yes	Yes	Yes		Yes			Two	Yes
Western Suburbs Red Devils	1949	Yes	Yes	Yes	Two			Two	PC	Yes	Yes	Yes			Yes	Yes	Yes	Yes		Yes			Two	Yes
Appin Dogs	2019			Yes												G6								G6
Avondale Greyhounds	1976			Yes		Yes				Yes	Yes					Yes		Yes	Yes				Yes	Yes
Mount Kembla Lowries	1912			Yes												No			Yes					No
Northern Suburbs	1946			Yes												Yes			Yes					Yes
Windang Pelicans	1974			Yes		Yes					Yes		Yes			Yes			Yes					Yes
Figtree Crushers	2020										Yes					No			Yes				Yes	No
Milton-Ulladulla Bulldogs	1930s						Yes							Yes		Yes		G7	G7	G7			G7	Yes
Port Kembla Blacks	1913		Yes			Yes										Yes								Yes
Stingrays of Shellharbour	2013						Yes							Yes		Yes		G7	G7	G7	Yes		G7	Yes
Woonona-Bulli Bushrangers	1972							Yes							Yes	Yes							Yes	Yes
Mt Warrigal Kooris																			G7		Yes			No
