= Illawarra Rugby League =

Rugby league competition in Australia

Illawarra Division Rugby League
- Sport: Rugby league
- Instituted: 1911
- Inaugural season: 1911
- Number of teams: 14
- Country: Australia
- Premiers: Wests (2025)
- Most titles: Port Kembla (24 titles)
- Website: Illawarra Rugby League
- Broadcast partner: BarTV Sports
- Related competition: Presidents Cup Conferences: *Denton Engineering Cup (North); *Ron Massey Cup (Central); *Peter McDonald Premiership (West)

The Illawarra Rugby League is a rugby league competition in Wollongong. It is one of the oldest rugby league competitions in Australia, founded in 1911 with five clubs (Dapto, Helensburgh, Mount Keira, Unanderra and Wollongong). The area provides a nursery of juniors for the Illawarra Steelers and St George Illawarra Dragons. The season is contested by seven teams and concludes with a finals series involving the top four teams.

== History ==
Only the Northern parts of the Illawarra have traditionally been included in this competition, with teams further south playing in Group 7. However, Shellharbour's decision in 2009 to field a team in the NSW Cup was coupled with a decision to play in the Illawarra Rugby League as well, blurring the boundary between the two competitions. Other Group 7 clubs are fielding teams in the lower leagues of Illawarra competitions and there's a possibility the two competitions may merge.

The Illawarra Division is one of the strongest, along with Newcastle, local competition in New South Wales. The league features many former and current players from the NRL Senior Competition and also players from the NRL Youth Competition. The Illawarra Division Senior representative team are two-time National Country champions and have won the Country Rugby League championships consistently. The Division also supplies players to the NSWRL Harold Matthews and SG Ball Cup competitions.

On 21 July 2011, whilst celebrating their centenary, Illawarra Rugby League announced their "Team of the Century". Immortals Graeme Langlands and Bob Fulton featured at fullback and five-eighth respectively, as well as Harry Wells at centre. The entire team follows:

In 2022, the First Grade competition was elevated to Major Competitions Level, with two teams joining from Sydney in Cronulla-Caringbah and De La Salle Caringbah. The former departed after just one season, while the latter lasted four, winning back-to-back minor premierships in 2023 and 2024, before departing at the end of 2025. The Helensburgh Tigers also dropped to reserve grade around this time.

In early 2026, the Sutherland-Loftus Pirates were announced as the replacement for De La Salle, taking over the club's affiliation with NSW Cup club Newtown Jets and joining the Illawarra Cup that season.

== Teams ==
The following table lists the clubs and the teams fielded in the 2026 senior competitions: Mojo Homes Illawarra Cup - NSWRL President's Cup Southern Conference (PC), Division 1 (Div1), Division 2 (Div2), Under 18s (U18), Women's tackle (Wom), Ladies League Tag (LLT). The table also indicates whether the club has junior teams.

Clubs are listed by their highest grade of competition.

Club	First Season	Homeground	Premierships	Premiership Years	2026 Season					
Club	First Season	Homeground	Premierships	Premiership Years	IC	Res	3rd	U18	LLT	Jnr
First Grade Clubs
Collegians Collie Dogs	1933	Collegians Sporting Complex, Figtree	12	1967, 1987, 1996-98, 2004-05, 2007, 2013, 2017, 2019, 2022	Yes	Yes	-	Yes	Yes	Yes
Corrimal Cougars	1912	Robert Zeims Park	2	1948, 1974	Yes	Yes	-	Yes	Yes	Yes
Dapto Canaries	1911	Dapto Showground	17	1966, 1968, 1975-77, 1979, 1982-83, 1985, 1990, 1992, 1994, 2000-02, 2006, 2016	Yes	Yes	-	-	Yes	Yes
Sutherland-Loftus Pirates	2026	Sutherland Oval	0	None	Yes	-	-	-	-	-
Thirroul Butchers	1913	Thomas Gibson Oval	10	1940, 1954, 1973, 1995, 1999, 2003, 2008, 2012, 2014, 2023	Yes	Yes	-	Yes	Two	Yes
Western Suburbs Red Devils	1949	Sid Parrish Park, Figtree	16	1957, 1959, 1969-72, 1978, 1980-81, 1984, 1989, 1991, 2009-11, 2018	Yes	Yes	-	Yes	Two	Yes
Second/Reserve Grade Clubs
Avondale Wombats	2024	Dandaloo Sports Ground, Dapto	0	None	-	Yes	Yes	-	-	-
Helensburgh Tigers	1911	Rex Jackson Oval	4	1986, 1988, 1993, 2015	-	Yes	-	-	Yes	Yes
Third Grade Clubs
Avondale Greyhounds	1976	Reed Park, Dapto	10		-	-	Yes	-	Yes	Yes
Berkeley Eagles	1955	Berkeley Sports Ground	4		-	Yes	Yes	Yes	-	Yes
Figtree Crushers	1995	Figtree High School	2	1997, 2020	-	-	Yes	-	Yes	No
Mount Kembla Lowries	1912	Mt Kembla Park	8	1912, 1931, 1936, 1939, 1939 (SG), 1941, 2005, 2006	-	-	Yes	-	-	-
Northern Suburbs Bulldogs	1946	Jim Allen Oval, Wombarra	3	1952, 1960-61	-	-	Yes	-	-	Yes
Windang Sharks/Pelicans	1974	Boronia Oval, Windang	2		-	-	Yes	-	-	Yes
Junior/Women's Only Clubs
Port Kembla Blacks	1913	Noel Mulligan Oval	24	1922-24, 1927-28, 1934-35, 1937-38, 1941-44, 1946, 1949, 1953, 1955-56, 1962-63, 1965	-	-	-	Yes	-	Yes
Woonona-Bulli Bushrangers	1972	Hollymount Park	0	None	-	-	-	-	Yes	Yes

=== Map ===
Local Area	in New South Wales
Locations of Illawarra Rugby League clubs. (Black = First Division Club, Red = Second Division/Junior Club)	Relation to state & national capitals

== Former clubs ==
=== First Grade ===
Clubs with at least one season in 1st Grade

- Albion Park (1926–31 lower grades, 1934–37 1st Grade)
- Army (1942–43 1st & 2nd grade)
- Bombo (1925–27)
- Bulli (1926 1st grade, 1927–31 lower grades)
- Cronulla-Caringbah Sharks (2022 1st grade)
- De La Salle Caringbah (2022–25 1st grade)
- Diggers (1919 2nd grade, 1920–21 1st grade)
- Gerringong (1925–27)
- Glebe (1921–23 lower grades, 1924–28 1st grade)
- Jamberoo (1928–30)
- Kiama (1926 3rd grade, 1927–28 1st grade)
- Mount Keira (1912–13, 1920, 1924-28, 1932-39, 1945-48 (as Unanderra-Kiera) 1st grade; 1914 & 1919 2nd grades, 1922–23 lower grades, 1929–31 lower grades, 1940–44 lower grades) – Formally merged with Unanderra to form Western Suburbs in 1949
- Main Roads Board (1927)
- North Wollongong (1931 1st grade, 1923–24 3rd grade)
- Scarborough (1938–40 1st grade, 1920–21 & 1941–46 lower grades)
- Services (1942–43 1st grade; a separate team from Army)
- Shellharbour Sharks (2009–13 1st grade; 1928, 1930 & 1944 lower grades)
- Unanderra (1912–14, 1919–21, 1923, 1926–30, 1945–48 (as Unanderra-Keira); 1922, 1924–25, 1932–33, 1944 lower grades) – Formally merged with Mount Kiera to form Western Suburbs in 1949
- University of Wollongong (Books 1988–2005 1st grade; Titans 2009 3rd grade, 2010–11 1st grade; 1975–76 Division 2). Also known as the Lighthouse Keepers.
- Wentworthville Magpies (1975–77)
- West Wollongong (1921–24 lower grades, 1925–26 1st grade, 1927–28 lower grades, 1929–35 1st grade)
- Wollongong (Buccaneers 1912–14, 1919–24, 1929–71 1st grade; Wolves 1972–88 1st grade; Bulls 1997 lower grades, 1998–2005 1st grade; Wollongong-University Bulls joint venture 2006–08 1st grade)

=== Lower Grades only ===
Clubs or teams that participated in two or more seasons are listed below. Participants in the Amateur Rugby League (1982–87) are included.

- Albion Park Outlaws (1991–97, 2010–13)
- Austinmer (1997–99)
- Balgownie Tigers (1913–14, 1921–22, 1944–52, 1973–93)
- Baxters Goannas (1991–93)
- Bellambi (1997–2002)
- Bomaderry Swamp Rats (2016–18 Women)
- Bulli Hotel Colts (1989–95, 2005–09)
- Cabbage Tree Hotel (1994)
- Coniston (1931–33)
- Fairy Meadow Chargers (1972–90)
- Guinerys Goannas (1979–90)
- Harp Angels (1986-91; Harp Hares 2003)
- Illawarra All Blacks (1992–93)
- Imperial Hotel Knights (1991–94)
- Kiama Surf Bees (1988–92)
- Lakeview Bears (1989–95)
- Open Hearth Hotel (1975–78)
- North Wollongong Surf (1972–79, 2009–14)
- Ryans Hotel (1981–83 Roos, 1985–87 Colts)
- Shellharbour Barracudas (1996–97)
- South Pacific Lions (1981–82)
- Tech (1944–54 Under 18/19 & 16/17 teams)
- The Blues (Berkeley, 1997–99)
- Unanderra Falcons (1981–97)
- Welcome Inn (1995 Knights, 1996 Steamers)

== First Grade Premiers ==
Tip: To view original newspaper articles on matches up to 1954, hover over the blue number in the Reports column and then click on the article name. That will open the article in Trove.

Season	Grand Final Information				Minor Premiers
Season	Premiers	Score	Runners-Up	Report	Minor Premiers
1911	Wollongong	5–5	Mt. Keira	IM	Wollongong
1912	Berkeley (Unanderra)	11–0	Mt. Keira	IM
1913	Wollongong	10–5	Mt. Keira		Wollongong
1914	Unanderra	5–3	Wollongong	IM
1915	Unanderra			IM
1916–1918 – No competition due to World War I
1919	Unanderra	8–5	Wollongong	IM
1920	Wollongong				Wollongong
1921	Wollongong	5–3	Port Kembla	IM
1922	Port Kembla	0–0	Wollongong	IM
1922	Port Kembla	5–3	Wollongong	IM
1923	Port Kembla	3–0	Wollongong	IM
1924	Port Kembla	22–13	Wollongong (Glebe)	IM
1925	Gerringong	9–8	Port Kembla	SCT
1926	Wollongong (Glebe)	13–7	Mt. Keira	IM
1927	Port Kembla	2–0	Wollongong (Glebe)	IM	Port Kembla
1928	Port Kembla	10–6	Mt. Keira	IM	Port Kembla
1929	Wollongong	Forfeit	Port Kembla	IM	Wollongong
1930	Wollongong	13–6	Port Kembla	IM	Port Kembla
1931	Wollongong	31–14	Thirroul	IM	Wollongong
1932	Wollongong	5–4	Mt. Keira	SCT
1933	West Wollongong	17–17	Wollongong	IM	West Wollongong
1933 Replay	West Wollongong	16–11	Wollongong	IM
1934	Port Kembla	8–6	West Wollongong	IM	West Wollongong
1935	Port Kembla	15–8	West Wollongong	IM	Port Kembla
1936	Mount Kembla	12–8	Port Kembla	IM	Port Kembla
1937	Port Kembla	41–10	Wollongong	IM	Port Kembla
1938	Port Kembla	18–5	Mount Kembla	IM	Port Kembla
1939 (SG)	Mount Kembla	26–15	Port Kembla	IM	Mount Kembla
1939	Mount Kembla	0–0	Corrimal	IM	Corrimal
1939 Replay	Mount Kembla	8–2	Corrimal	IM	Corrimal
1940	Thirroul	4–3	Corrimal	IM	Thirroul
1941	Port Kembla	24–7	Corrimal
1942	Port Kembla	17–9	Collegians (CBC)	IM	Port Kembla
1943	Port Kembla	16–5	Port Kembla	IM	Wollongong
1944	Port Kembla	30–8	Thirroul	IM	Port Kembla
1945	Wollongong	5–2	Port Kembla	IM
1946	Port Kembla	19–14	Wollongong	IM
1947	Wollongong	21–8	Port Kembla	IM	Port Kembla
1948	Corrimal	22–7	Port Kembla	IM	Port Kembla
1949	Port Kembla	20–9	Wollongong	IM	Wollongong
1950	Wollongong	9–6	Port Kembla	IM	Port Kembla
1951	Wollongong	15–11	Corrimal	IM	Corrimal
1952	North Wollongong	18–5	Port Kembla	IM	North Wollongong
1953	Port Kembla	10–7	North Wollongong	IM	Port Kembla
1954	Thirroul	20–7	Port Kembla	IM	Thirroul
1955	Port Kembla	20–7	Wollongong	IM	Port Kembla
1956	Port Kembla	14–9	Wollongong	IM	Wollongong
1957	Wests	22–6	Wollongong
1958	Port Kembla	10–8	Wests
1959	Wests	12–6	North Wollongong
1960	North Wollongong	10–5	Port Kembla	IM	Port Kembla
1961	North Wollongong	10–2	Wollongong
1962	Port Kembla	10–9	North Wollongong	IM	North Wollongong
1963	Port Kembla	13–0	North Wollongong	IM	Port Kembla
1964	Wollongong	23–5	Port Kembla	IM	Wollongong
1965	Port Kembla	6–4	Wollongong		Collegians
1966	Dapto	13–6	Collegians		Collegians
1967	Collegians	12–4	Port Kembla		Collegians
1968	Dapto	17–11	Port Kembla	IM	Port Kembla
1969	Wests	11–2	Port Kembla		Port Kembla
1970	Wests	12–4	Dapto	IM	Thirroul
1971	Wests	18–11	Thirroul
1972	Wests	23–9	Thirroul
1973	Thirroul	8–6	Wests
1974	Corrimal	22–8	Wollongong	IM	Wollongong
1975	Dapto	15–2	Thirroul
1976	Dapto	22–6	Corrimal
1977	Dapto	18–5	Port Kembla		Wests
1978	Wests	17–13	Port Kembla		Wests
1979	Dapto	22–3	Wests	IM	Wests
1980	Wests	6–0	Port Kembla
1981	Wests	22–0	Corrimal
1982	Dapto	15–12	Corrimal		Corrimal
1983	Dapto	23–10	Wests		Wests
1984	Wests	24–4	Helensburgh	IM	Wests
1985	Dapto	40–4	Collegians	IM	Dapto
1986	Helensburgh	8–6	Collegians	IM	Collegians
1987	Collegians	16–2	Wests	IM	Thirroul
1988	Helensburgh	20–16	Collegians	IM	Collegians
1989	Wests	13–12	Corrimal		Corrimal
1990	Dapto	28–2	Collegians
1991	Wests	14–12	Dapto		Wests
1992	Dapto	28–6	University	IM	Dapto
1993	Helensburgh	22–8	Wests		Helensburgh
1994	Dapto	22–14	Wests	IM
1995	Thirroul	23–22	Wests		Thirroul
1996	Collegians	11–2	Thirroul		Collegians
1997	Collegians	32–16	Dapto	IM
1998	Collegians	34–10	University	IM
1999	Thirroul	40–12	Collegians
2000	Dapto	30–14	Thirroul		Dapto
2001	Dapto	18–12	Thirroul		Collegians
2002	Dapto	20–16	Collegians		Collegians
2003	Thirroul	28–22	Dapto	RLW	Thirroul
2004	Collegians	10–4	Thirroul		Collegians
2005	Collegians	16–14	Wests		Collegians
2006	Dapto	34–14	Thirroul		Dapto
2007	Collegians	20–18	Dapto		Dapto
2008	Thirroul	16–12	Collegians		Thirroul
2009	Wests	14–4	Thirroul		Wests
2010	Wests	24–0	Thirroul		Wests
2011	Wests	34–24	Helensburgh		Wests
2012	Thirroul	20–16	Wests	TB	Wests
2013	Collegians	29–28	Helensburgh		Collegians
2014	Thirroul	18–16	Helensburgh	IM VH	Thirroul
2015	Helensburgh	16–10	Wests	VH	Helensburgh
2016	Dapto	28–16	Wests	VH	Dapto
2017	Collegians	22–14	Dapto	IM VH	Dapto
2018	Wests	18–16	Thirroul	VH	Wests
2019	Collegians	16–14	Wests	IM VH	Thirroul
2020	No 1st Grade competition due to COVID-19.
2021	Competition suspended and subsequently abandoned due to COVID-19.
2022	Collegians	12–10	Wests	VH NS	Thirroul
2023	Thirroul	24–18	Collegians	BFBF	De La Salle Caringbah
2024	Wests	31–20	Thirroul	BFBF	De La Salle Caringbah
2025	Wests	14–8	Collegians	BFBF	Collegians
2026	Collegians	56–12	Corrimal	IMBFBF	Corrimal

== Reserve Grade Premiers ==
Season	Grand Final Information
Season	Premiers
1912	Mount Kembla
1913	Wollongong
1914	Unanderra
1915–1918 – No competition due to World War I
1919	Port Kembla
1920	Port Kembla
1921	Port Kembla
1922	Port Kembla
1922	Mt. Keira
1923	Mt. Keira
1924	Corrimal
1925	Wollongong (Glebe)
1926	Dapto
1927	Wests
1928	Port Kembla
1929	Port Kembla
1930	Wollongong
1931	Mount Kembla
1932	Mt. Keira
1933	Port Kembla
1934	Mt. Keira
1935	Port Kembla
1936	Port Kembla
1937	Port Kembla
1938	Port Kembla
1939	Wollongong
1940	Port Kembla
1941	Mount Kembla
1942	Thirroul
1943	Thirroul
1944	Unanderra
1945	Wollongong
1946	Wollongong
1947	Thirroul
1948	Wollongong
1949	Wollongong
1950	Port Kembla
1951	Wollongong
1952	Dapto
1953	Wollongong
1954	Port Kembla
1955	Port Kembla
1956	Dapto
1957	Port Kembla
1958	Port Kembla
1959	Northern Suburbs Bulldogs
1960	Thirroul
1961	Dapto
1962	Northern Suburbs Bulldogs
1963	Northern Suburbs Bulldogs
1964	Wests
1965	Port Kembla
1966	Port Kembla
1967	Port Kembla
1968	Port Kembla
1969	Thirroul
1970	Corrimal
1971	Dapto
1972	Dapto
1973	Corrimal
1974	Thirroul
1975	Corrimal
1976	Thirroul
1977	Port Kembla
1978	Dapto
1979	Dapto
1980	Dapto
1981	Dapto
1982	Dapto
1983	Corrimal
1984	Dapto
1985	Wests
1986	Collegians
1987	Dapto
1988	Collegians
1989	Collegians
1990	Dapto
1991	Wests
1992	Dapto
1993	Helensburgh
1994	Dapto
1995	Dapto
1996	Thirroul
1997	Dapto
1998	Thirroul
1999	Helensburgh
2000	Thirroul
2001	Thirroul
2002	Wests
2003	Wests
2004	Wests
2005	Wests
2006	Dapto
2007	Wests
2008	Wests
2009	Thirroul
2010	Berkeley Eagles
2011
2012
2013
2014
2015
2016
2017
2018
2019
2020	No 1st Grade competition due to COVID-19.
2021	Competition suspended and subsequently abandoned due to COVID-19.
2022
2023
2024
2025

== Lower Grade Premiers ==
Season	Grand Final Information
Season	3rd Grade	4th Grade / 2nd Division
1914	Balgownie Tigers
1915–1918 – No competition due to World War I
1919	Mt. Keira
1920
1921
1922	Wollongong
1923	Port Kembla
1924	Wollongong
1925
1926
1927	kiama
1928	Mt. Keira	Wollongong
1929	Mt. Keira	Albion Park
1930	Wollongong
1931
1932		Mount Kembla
1933
1934	Wollongong
1948	Wollongong
1949	Wollongong
1950	Port Kembla
1951	Port Kembla
1952	Wollongong
1953	Wollongong
1954	Port Kembla
1955	Northern Suburbs Bulldogs
1956	Port Kembla
1957	Port Kembla
1958	Port Kembla
1959	Port Kembla
1960	Port Kembla
1961	Port Kembla
1962	Port Kembla
1963	Northern Suburbs Bulldogs
1964	Port Kembla
1965	Dapto	REINTRODUCED 1966
1966	Collegians	Collegians
1967	Collegians	Dapto
1968	Port Kembla	Wollongong
1969	Collegians	Collegians
1970	Corrimal	Corrimal
1971	Port Kembla	Wests
1972	Berkeley Eagles	North Wollongong Surf
1973	Port Kembla	Fairy Meadow Chargers
1974	Corrimal	North Surf
1975	Thirroul	North Surf
1976	Wentworthville Magpies	North Surf
1977	Wentworthville Magpies	North Surf
1978	Corrimal	Avondale Greyhounds
1979	Dapto	Avondale Greyhounds
1980	Thirroul	Woonona Colts
1981	Thirroul	Fairy Meadow Chargers
1982	Dapto
1983	Collegians
1984	Dapto
1985		Northern Suburbs Bulldogs
1986	Collegians	Northern Suburbs Bulldogs
1987	Dapto
1988	Collegians	Northern Suburbs Bulldogs
1989	University of Wollongong
1990	Wests	Northern Suburbs Bulldogs
1991	Wests	Northern Suburbs Bulldogs
1992	Dapto	Northern Suburbs Bulldogs
1993	Wests
1994	Wests
1995	Port Kembla
1996	MERGED WITH 2ND DIVISION
1997		Figtree Crushers
1998		Avondale Greyhounds
1999		Avondale Greyhounds
2000		Avondale Greyhounds
2001		Avondale Greyhounds
2002		Avondale Greyhounds
2003		Avondale Greyhounds
2004		Berkeley Eagles
2005		Mount Kembla
2006		Mount Kembla
2007		Windang Sharks
2008		Windang Sharks
2009		University of Wollongong
2010		Port Kembla
2011
2012
2013
2014
2015
2016
2017
2018
2019
2020		Figtree Crushers
2021	Competition suspended and subsequently abandoned due to COVID-19.
2022		Northern Suburbs Bulldogs
2023		Berkeley Eagles
2024		Avondale Greyhounds
2025		Avondale Greyhounds

== Women's Opens Premiership ==
Season	Grand Final Information				Minor Premiers
Season	Premiers	Score	Runners-Up	Report	Minor Premiers
2011	Helensburgh	48–12	University of Wollongong	IM
2012	Helensburgh		Wests		Wests
2014	Helensburgh	42–6	Port Kembla	VH	Helensburgh
2015	Corrimal	20–16	Helensburgh	VH	Corrimal
2016	Helensburgh	24–10	Corrimal	VH	Berkeley
2017	Corrimal	24–0	Berkeley	VH	Corrimal
2018	Corrimal	28–0	Helensburgh	VH	Corrimal
2019	Corrimal	18–8	Helensburgh	VH	Helensburgh
2020	Helensburgh	40–24	Corrimal	NSWRL VH	Helensburgh
No competitions in 2021–2022 seasons
2023–onwards merged with Women's Southern Corridor Competition

== See also ==
- Rugby League Competitions in Australia
- Rugby league in New South Wales
- Group 7 Rugby League

== External links and Sources ==
- First grade ladder – from Sporting Pulse site
- Illawarra RL on Country Rugby League's official site
- Trove Digitised Newspapers
- Rugby League Week at State Library of NSW Research and Collections
