= 2022 NSWRL Presidents Cup =

Rugby league competition

The 2022 New South Wales Rugby League Presidents Cup will be a competition to determine the best semi-professional Rugby League team in New South Wales. It will be the third season of the competition. The 2022 season will add the Western Conference into the competition, which brings the conferences up to 4 (Central, Northern, Southern and Western). The winners of each conference will play a 2-week knockout series to determine the Presidents Cup winners.

== Presidents Cup ==
Semi-finals
Forbes	6
Maitland	52
Collegians	16
Hills	26

Grand Final
Maitland	36
Hills	12

Home	Score	Away	Match Information
Home	Score	Away	Date and Time	Venue	Referee
Semi-finals
Forbes Magpies	6 – 52	Maitland Pickers	Saturday, 17 September, 2:00pm	Pioneer Oval	Jake Sutherland
Collegians Collie Dogs	16 – 26	Hills Bulls	Saturday, 17 September, 3:00pm	Collegians Sports Stadium	Cameron Paddy
Grand Final
Maitland Pickers	36 – 12	Hills Bulls	Sunday, 25 September, 11:00am	CommBank Stadium	Cameron Paddy

== Central Conference (Ron Massey Cup) ==
2022 Ron Massey Cup
- Duration: 20 March – 4 September 2022
- Teams: 9
- Minor premiers: Hills Bulls
- Wooden spoon: Western Suburbs Magpies
- Broadcast partners: NSWRL TV
- Top points scorer: Brad Keighran (135)
- Top try-scorer: Raymond Lesoa (12)

The Ron Massey Cup will feature 9 teams in 2022, 2 less than the 11 in 2021. All 9 teams are based in Sydney in 2022.

=== Teams ===
Colours	Club	Presidents Cup Season	Home ground(s)	Head coach
	Blacktown Workers Sea Eagles	2nd season	HE Laybutt Sporting Complex	Brad Prior
	Glebe Dirty Reds	2nd season	Henson Park	TBA
	Hills Bulls	3rd season	Crestwood Reserve	Michael Withers
	Kaiviti Silktails	2nd season	Mascot Oval	Wes Naiqama
	Mount Pritchard Mounties	2nd season	Aubrey Keech Reserve	Michael Potter (to May 18)
	Ryde-Eastwood Hawks	2nd season	TG Milner Field	TBA
	St Marys Saints	2nd season	St Marys Leagues Stadium	Wayne Collins
	Wentworthville Magpies	3rd season	Ringrose Park	TBA
	Western Suburbs Magpies	2nd season	Lidcombe Oval	TBA

=== Ladder ===
Pos	Team	Pld	W	D	L	B	PF	PA	PD	Pts
1	Hills Bulls	16	15	0	1	2	473	187	+286	34
2	St Marys Saints	16	12	0	4	2	438	278	+160	28
3	Glebe Dirty Reds	16	11	0	5	2	480	266	+214	26
4	Wentworthville Magpies	16	9	0	7	2	348	313	+35	22
5	Mount Pritchard Mounties	16	7	1	8	2	322	386	−64	19
6	Kaiviti Silktails	16	6	1	9	2	407	371	+36	17
7	Ryde-Eastwood Hawks	16	4	1	11	2	296	480	−184	13
8	Blacktown Workers Sea Eagles	16	3	2	11	2	267	468	−201	12
9	Western Suburbs Magpies	16	2	1	13	2	200	482	−282	9

Updated to match(es) played on 7 August. Source:
Rules for classification: 1) points; 2) point difference; 3) points scored

==== Ladder progression ====
- Numbers highlighted in green indicate that the team finished the round inside the top 5.
- Numbers highlighted in blue indicates the team finished first on the ladder in that round.
- Numbers highlighted in red indicates the team finished last place on the ladder in that round.
- Underlined numbers indicate that the team had a bye during that round.

Pos	Team	1	5	6	7	8	3	9	10	11	12	13	2	15	16	17	18	4	14
1	Hills Bulls	2	8	10	12	14	14	16	18	18	20	22	22	26	28	30	32	32	32
2	St Marys Saints	2	8	10	12	14	14	16	18	20	22	24	24	26	26	26	26	26	28
3	Glebe Dirty Reds	2	10	12	12	12	12	12	12	14	16	18	18	22	24	26	26	26	26
4	Wentworthville Magpies	0	2	4	4	4	4	4	6	8	8	10	10	14	16	18	20	22	22
5	Mount Pritchard Mounties	0	2	2	4	6	6	8	8	8	8	10	12	14	14	16	18	19	19
6	Kaiviti Silktails	0	0	2	4	6	8	8	10	10	10	10	10	12	14	14	16	17	17
7	Ryde-Eastwood Hawks	2	4	4	4	4	4	6	8	9	11	11	11	11	13	13	13	13	13
8	Blacktown Workers Sea Eagles	2	4	4	6	8	8	8	8	9	9	9	9	9	9	10	12	12	12
9	Western Suburbs Magpies	0	2	2	2	2	2	4	4	6	8	8	8	8	8	9	9	9	9

=== Season results ===
==== Round 1 ====
Home	Score	Away	Match Information
Home	Score	Away	Date and Time	Venue	Referee
Mount Pritchard Mounties	20 – 48	St Marys Saints	Sunday, 20 March, 1:00pm	Aubrey Keech Reserve	Damian Brady
Ryde-Eastwood Hawks	38 – 6	Western Suburbs Magpies	Sunday, 20 March, 1:00pm	TG Milner Field	Martin Jones
Blacktown Workers Sea Eagles	36 – 28	Kaiviti Silktails	Sunday, 20 March, 3:00pm	HE Laybutt Sporting Complex	Mitchell Currie
Wentworthville Magpies	24 – 30	Glebe Dirty Reds	Sunday, 20 March, 3:00pm	Ringrose Park	Nathan Loveday
Hills Bulls		BYE

==== Round 2 ====
Home	Score	Away	Match Information
Home	Score	Away	Date and Time	Venue	Referee
Kaiviti Silktails	6 – 16	Glebe Dirty Reds	Saturday, 26 March, 3:00pm	Mascot Oval	Nathan Loveday
St Marys Saints	4 – 20	Hills Bulls	Saturday, 26 March, 4:00pm	St Marys Leagues Stadium	Martin Jones
Ryde-Eastwood Hawks	16 – 30	Blacktown Workers Sea Eagles	Sunday, 27 March, 3:00pm	TG Milner Field	Clayton Wills
Mount Pritchard Mounties	28 – 18	Wentworthville Magpies	Friday, 24 June, 7:00pm	Aubrey Keech Reserve	Tom Cambourn
Western Suburbs Magpies		BYE

==== Round 3 ====
Home	Score	Away	Match Information
Home	Score	Away	Date and Time	Venue	Referee
Mount Pritchard Mounties	18 – 20	Ryde-Eastwood Hawks	Saturday, 2 April, 1:00pm	Aubrey Keech Reserve	Clayton Wills
Blacktown Workers Sea Eagles	16 – 36	St Marys Saints	Sunday, 3 April, 1:00pm	HE Laybutt Sporting Complex	Thomas Cambourn
Hills Bulls	20 – 6	Wentworthville Magpies	Sunday, 3 April, 3:00pm	Crestwood Reserve	Nathan Loveday
Western Suburbs Magpies	12 – 34	Kaiviti Silktails	Saturday, 14 May, 2:00pm	Lidcombe Oval	Matt Noyen
Glebe Dirty Reds		BYE

==== Round 4 ====
Home	Score	Away	Match Information
Home	Score	Away	Date and Time	Venue	Referee
Glebe Dirty Reds	36 – 24	Ryde-Eastwood Hawks	Saturday, 9 April, 12:30pm	Henson Park	Nathan Loveday
Western Suburbs Magpies	6 – 24	Hills Bulls	Saturday, 25 June, 2:00pm	Lidcombe Oval	Nathan Loveday
Kaiviti Silktails	26 – 26	Mount Pritchard Mounties	Saturday, 6 August, 3:00pm	Mascot Oval	Nathan Loveday
Wentworthville Magpies	22* – 17	Blacktown Workers Sea Eagles	Saturday, 6 August, 4:00pm	Ringrose Park	N/A
St Marys Saints		BYE

==== Round 5 ====
Home	Score	Away	Match Information
Home	Score	Away	Date and Time	Venue	Referee
Mount Pritchard Mounties	30 – 12	Blacktown Workers Sea Eagles	Friday, 15 April, 3:00pm	Aubrey Keech Reserve	Clayton Wills
St Marys Saints	30 – 22	Ryde-Eastwood Hawks	Friday, 15 April, 3:00pm	St Marys Leagues Stadium	Mitchell Currie
Kaiviti Silktails	20 – 27	Hills Bulls	Saturday, 16 April, 2:00pm	North Sydney Oval	Cameron Turner
Glebe Dirty Reds	44 – 4	Western Suburbs Magpies	Saturday, 16 April, 3:00pm	Henson Park	Thomas Cambourn
Wentworthville Magpies		BYE

==== Round 6 ====
Home	Score	Away	Match Information
Home	Score	Away	Date and Time	Venue	Referee
Glebe Dirty Reds	58 – 18	Blacktown Workers Sea Eagles	Saturday, 23 April, 12:30pm	Henson Park	Jake Sutherland
Western Suburbs Magpies	10 – 32	St Marys Saints	Saturday, 23 April, 3:00pm	Lidcombe Oval	Clayton Wills
Wentworthville Magpies	38 – 14	Ryde-Eastwood Hawks	Sunday, 24 April, 2:00pm	Ringrose Park	Thomas Cambourn
Hills Bulls	32 – 10	Mount Pritchard Mounties	Sunday, 24 April, 3:00pm	Crestwood Reserve	Mitchell Currie
Kaiviti Silktails		BYE

==== Round 7 ====
Home	Score	Away	Match Information
Home	Score	Away	Date and Time	Venue	Referee
Western Suburbs Magpies	18 – 20	Mount Pritchard Mounties	Saturday, 30 April, 3:00pm	Lidcombe Oval	Thomas Cambourn
St Marys Saints	28 – 16	Wentworthville Magpies	Sunday, 1 May, 3:00pm	St Marys Leagues Stadium	Mitchell Currie
Ryde-Eastwood Hawks	16 – 30	Kaiviti Silktails	Sunday, 1 May, 3:00pm	TG Milner Field	Jake Sutherland
Hills Bulls	38 – 22	Glebe Dirty Reds	Sunday, 1 May, 3:00pm	Crestwood Reserve	Clayton Wills
Blacktown Workers Sea Eagles		BYE

==== Round 8 ====
Home	Score	Away	Match Information
Home	Score	Away	Date and Time	Venue	Referee
St Marys Saints	20 – 18	Glebe Dirty Reds	Saturday, 7 May, 4:00pm	St Marys Leagues Stadium	Daniel Luttringer
Wentworthville Magpies	22 – 28	Kaiviti Silktails	Sunday, 8 May, 2:00pm	Ringrose Park	Clayton Wills
Blacktown Workers Sea Eagles	18 – 16	Western Suburbs Magpies	Sunday, 8 May, 3:00pm	HE Laybutt Sporting Complex	Martin Jones
Hills Bulls	30 – 10	Ryde-Eastwood Hawks	Sunday, 8 May, 3:00pm	Crestwood Reserve	Jake Sutherland
Mount Pritchard Mounties		BYE

==== Round 9 ====
Home	Score	Away	Match Information
Home	Score	Away	Date and Time	Venue	Referee
Glebe Dirty Reds	20 – 34	Mount Pritchard Mounties	Saturday, 21 May, 12:30pm	Henson Park	Tom Stindl
Western Suburbs Magpies	28 – 24	Wentworthville Magpies	Saturday, 21 May, 1:00pm	Lidcombe Oval	Martin Jones
St Marys Saints	18 – 16	Kaiviti Silktails	Saturday, 21 May, 4:00pm	St Marys Leagues Stadium	Clayton Wills
Blacktown Workers Sea Eagles	10 – 37	Hills Bulls	Sunday, 22 May, 3:00pm	HE Laybutt Sporting Complex	Jake Sutherland
Ryde-Eastwood Hawks		BYE

==== Round 10 ====
Home	Score	Away	Match Information
Home	Score	Away	Date and Time	Venue	Referee
Glebe Dirty Reds	16 – 26	Wentworthville Magpies	Saturday, 28 May, 3:00pm	Henson Park	Clayton Wills
St Marys Saints	32 – 12	Mount Pritchard Mounties	Saturday, 28 May, 4:00pm	St Marys Leagues Stadium	Cameron Turner
Kaiviti Silktails	36 – 34	Blacktown Workers Sea Eagles	Sunday, 29 May, 3:00pm	Windsor Sporting Complex	Martin Jones
Western Suburbs Magpies	18 – 28	Ryde-Eastwood Hawks	Sunday, 29 May, 3:00pm	Lidcombe Oval	Mitchell Currie
Hills Bulls		BYE

==== Round 11 ====
Home	Score	Away	Match Information
Home	Score	Away	Date and Time	Venue	Referee
Glebe Dirty Reds	28 – 24	Kaiviti Silktails	Saturday, 4 June, 3:00pm	Henson Park	Cameron Turner
Blacktown Workers Sea Eagles	18 – 18	Ryde-Eastwood Hawks	Sunday, 5 June, 3:00pm	HE Laybutt Sporting Complex	Clayton Wills
Hills Bulls	4 – 22	St Marys Saints	Sunday, 5 June, 3:00pm	Crestwood Reserve	Martin Jones
Wentworthville Magpies	20 – 10	Mount Pritchard Mounties	Sunday, 5 June, 4:00pm	Ringrose Park	Karra-Lee Nolan
Western Suburbs Magpies		BYE

==== Round 12 ====
Home	Score	Away	Match Information
Home	Score	Away	Date and Time	Venue	Referee
Kaiviti Silktails	26 – 30	Western Suburbs Magpies	Saturday, 11 June, 2:00pm	Mascot Oval	Martin Jones
Wentworthville Magpies	16 – 36	Hills Bulls	Sunday, 12 June, 3:00pm	Ringrose Park	Cameron Turner
St Marys Saints	30 – 10	Blacktown Workers Sea Eagles	Sunday, 12 June, 3:00pm	St Marys Leagues Stadium	Clayton Wills
Ryde-Eastwood Hawks	30 – 12	Mount Pritchard Mounties	Sunday, 12 June, 3:00pm	TG Milner Field	Mitchell Currie
Glebe Dirty Reds		BYE

==== Round 13 ====
Home	Score	Away	Match Information
Home	Score	Away	Date and Time	Venue	Referee
Mount Pritchard Mounties	24 – 16	Kaiviti Silktails	Sunday, 19 June, 1:00pm	Aubrey Keech Reserve	Karra-Lee Nolan
Blacktown Workers Sea Eagles	12 – 30	Wentworthville Magpies	Sunday, 19 June, 1:00pm	HE Laybutt Sporting Complex	Cameron Turner
Ryde-Eastwood Hawks	16 – 54	Glebe Dirty Reds	Sunday, 19 June, 3:00pm	TG Milner Field	Martin Jones
Hills Bulls	42 – 0	Western Suburbs Magpies	Sunday, 19 June, 3:00pm	Crestwood Reserve	Mitchell Currie
St Marys Saints		BYE

==== Round 14 ====
Home	Score	Away	Match Information
Home	Score	Away	Date and Time	Venue	Referee
Blacktown Workers Sea Eagles	4 – 30	Mount Pritchard Mounties	Sunday, 3 July, 1:00pm	HE Laybutt Sporting Complex	Mitchell Currie
Western Suburbs Magpies	0 – 38	Glebe Dirty Reds	Sunday, 3 July, 2:00pm	Lidcombe Oval	Karra-Lee Nolan
Hills Bulls	30* – 25	Kaiviti Silktails	Sunday, 3 July, 3:00pm	Crestwood Reserve	N/A
Ryde-Eastwood Hawks	28 – 66	St Marys Saints	Sunday, 7 August, 3:00pm	TG Milner Field	Karra-Lee Nolan
Wentworthville Magpies		BYE

==== Round 15 ====
Home	Score	Away	Match Information
Home	Score	Away	Date and Time	Venue	Referee
Mount Pritchard Mounties	6 – 36	Hills Bulls	Saturday, 9 July, 1:00pm	Aubrey Keech Reserve	Jake Sutherland
Blacktown Workers Sea Eagles	6 – 20	Glebe Dirty Reds	Sunday, 10 July, 1:00pm	HE Laybutt Sporting Complex	Martin Jones
St Marys Saints	32 – 6	Western Suburbs Magpies	Sunday, 10 July, 3:00pm	St Marys Leagues Stadium	Nathan Loveday
Ryde-Eastwood Hawks	0 – 10	Wentworthville Magpies	Sunday, 10 July, 3:00pm	TG Milner Field	Clayton Wills
Kaiviti Silktails		BYE

==== Round 16 ====
Home	Score	Away	Match Information
Home	Score	Away	Date and Time	Venue	Referee
Kaiviti Silktails	28 – 18	St Marys Saints	Saturday, 16 July, 12:00pm	Mascot Oval	Cameron Turner
Mount Pritchard Mounties	6 – 36	Glebe Dirty Reds	Sunday, 17 July, 1:00pm	Aubrey Keech Reserve	Nathan Loveday
Hills Bulls	45 – 10	Blacktown Workers Sea Eagles	Sunday, 17 July, 3:00pm	Crestwood Reserve	Mitchell Currie
Wentworthville Magpies	30* – 12	Western Suburbs Magpies	Sunday, 17 July, 3:00pm	Ringrose Park	N/A
Ryde-Eastwood Hawks		BYE

==== Round 17 ====
Home	Score	Away	Match Information
Home	Score	Away	Date and Time	Venue	Referee
Glebe Dirty Reds	28 – 0	St Marys Saints	Saturday, 23 July, 12:30pm	Henson Park	Martin Jones
Ryde-Eastwood Hawks	4 – 32	Hills Bulls	Saturday, 23 July, 1:00pm	TG Milner Field	Cameron Turner
Western Suburbs Magpies	16 – 16	Blacktown Workers Sea Eagles	Saturday, 23 July, 3:00pm	Lidcombe Oval	Karra-Lee Nolan
Kaiviti Silktails	12 – 22	Wentworthville Magpies	Saturday, 23 July, 3:00pm	Mascot Oval	Mitchell Currie
Mount Pritchard Mounties		BYE

==== Round 18 ====
Home	Score	Away	Match Information
Home	Score	Away	Date and Time	Venue	Referee
Mount Pritchard Mounties	36 – 18	Western Suburbs Magpies	Saturday, 30 July, 10:40am	Campbelltown Sports Stadium	Jake Sutherland
Glebe Dirty Reds	16 – 20	Hills Bulls	Saturday, 30 July, 12:30pm	Henson Park	Clayton Wills
Kaiviti Silktails	52 – 12	Ryde-Eastwood Hawks	Saturday, 30 July, 3:00pm	Mascot Oval	Karra-Lee Nolan
Wentworthville Magpies	24 – 22	St Marys Saints	Saturday, 30 July, 5:00pm	Ringrose Park	Martin Jones
Blacktown Workers Sea Eagles		BYE

=== Finals Series ===
Qualifying Final
2	St Marys	18
3	Glebe	28
4	Wentworthville	24
5	Mount Pritchard	14

Major Semi-final
1	Hills	10
3	Glebe	38
Minor Semi-final
2	St Marys	12
4	Wentworthville	23

Preliminary Final
1	Hills	22
4	Wentworthville	12

Grand Final
3	Glebe	12
1	Hills	18

Home	Score	Away	Match Information
Home	Score	Away	Date and Time	Venue	Referee
Qualifying & Elimination Finals
St Marys Saints	18 – 28	Glebe Dirty Reds	Saturday, 13 August, 3:00pm	Leichhardt Oval	Daniel Luttringer
Wentworthville Magpies	24 – 14	Mount Pritchard Mounties	Saturday, 13 August, 5:00pm	Leichhardt Oval	Damian Brady
Minor & Major Semi-finals
Hills Bulls	10 – 38	Glebe Dirty Reds	Saturday, 20 August, 1:00pm	St Marys Leagues Stadium	Damian Brady
St Marys Saints	12 – 23	Wentworthville Magpies	Saturday, 20 August, 5:00pm	St Marys Leagues Stadium	Daniel Luttringer
Preliminary final
Hills Bulls	22 – 12	Wentworthville Magpies	Sunday, 28 August, 3:00pm	Ringrose Park	Damian Brady
Grand Final
Glebe Dirty Reds	12 – 18	Hills Bulls	Sunday, 4 September, 3:00pm	Netstrata Jubilee Stadium	Damian Brady

Grand Final

Sunday, 4 September 2022
3pm (AEST)

Glebe Dirty Reds	12 — 18	Hills District Bulls
Tries: 2 Dylan O’Connor; Jonah Ngaronoa; Goals: 2 Eli Levido 2	HT: 6–18; Highlights; Reports	Tries: 3 Taniela Lasalo; Blake Goodman; Henry Raiwalui; Goals: 3 Brad Keighran 3

Netstrata Jubilee Stadium, Sydney
Referee: Damian Brady
Player of the Match: Jerry Key

== Northern Conference (Denton Engineering Cup) ==
2022 Denton Engineering Cup
- Duration: 26 March – 11 September 2022
- Teams: 10
- Minor premiers: Maitland Pickers
- Wooden spoon: Kurri Kurri Bulldogs
- Broadcast partners: Bar TV Sports
- Top points scorer: Brock Lamb (173)
- Top try-scorer: Cameron Anderson (15)

The Denton Engineering Cup will feature 10 teams in 2022, the same number as 2021.

=== Teams ===
Colours	Club	Presidents Cup Season	Home ground(s)	Head coach
	Central Newcastle Butcher Boys	2nd season	St John Oval	Phil Williams
	Cessnock Goannas	2nd season	Baddeley Park	Harry Siejka
	Kurri Kurri Bulldogs	2nd season	Kurri Kurri Sports Ground	Aaron Watts
	Lakes United Seagulls	2nd season	Cahill Oval	Ian Bourke
	Macquarie Scorpions	2nd season	Lyall Peacock Field	Steve Kidd
	Maitland Pickers	3rd season	Maitland Sportsground	Matt Lantry
	South Newcastle Lions	2nd season	Townson Oval	Andrew Ryan
	The Entrance Tigers	2nd season	EDSACC Oval	Jamy Forbes & Ben O'Connell
	Western Suburbs Rosellas	2nd season	Harker Oval	Todd Lowrie
	Wyong Roos	2nd season	Morry Breen Oval	Mitch Williams

=== Team of the Year ===
On Saturday 24 September 2022, the Newcastle Rugby League announced the Team of the Year and Player of the Year.

- Fullback – Cameron Anderson (Central Newcastle)
- Winger – James Bradley (Maitland Pickers)
- Centre – Matt Soper-Lawler (Maitland Pickers)
- Five-Eighth – Ryan Glanville (South Newcastle Lions)
- Halfback – Luke Walsh (Central Newcastle) & Player of the Year
- Prop – Jayden Butterfield (Maitland Pickers)
- Hooker – Mitch Williams (Wyong Roos)
- Second Row – Lewis Hamilton (South Newcastle Lions)
- Lock – Luke Higgins (Macquarie Scorpions)
- Coach – Phil Williams (Central Newcastle)
- Player of the Year – Luke Walsh (Central Newcastle)

Leaguecastle provides official statistics for the Newcastle Rugby League competition. Running a Dally-M Style voting competition based on best statistical performances (3/2/1 point votes per game), Leaguecastle announced their 2022 Newcastle Rugby League Team of the Year as follows:

==== Team of the Year ====
- Player of the Year – Joint Winners - Cam Anderson & Matt Soper-Lawler
- Fullback – Cameron Anderson (Central Newcastle)
- Wingers – James Bradley (Maitland Pickers) & Luke Sharpe (Wyong Roos)
- Centre – Matt Soper-Lawler (Maitland Pickers) & Kiah Cooper (Central Newcastle)
- Five-Eighth – Ryan Glanville (South Newcastle Lions)
- Halfback – Brock Lamb (Maitland Pickers)
- Props – Jayden Butterfield (Maitland Pickers) & Luke Higgins (Macquarie Scorpions)
- Hooker – Mitch Williams (Wyong Roos)
- Second Rows – Lewis Hamilton (South Newcastle Lions) & Reid Alchin (Maitland Pickers)
- Lock – Dan Peck (Lakes United)
- Coach – Steve Kidd & Matt Roach (Macquarie Scorpions)
- Bench - Matt Moon (Macquarie Scorpions), Will Pearsall (Entrance Tigers), Wyatt Shaw (Cessnock Goannas), Ryan Potts (Lakes United)

=== Ladder ===
Pos	Team	Pld	W	D	L	B	PF	PA	PD	Pts
1	Maitland Pickers	18	15	1	2	0	507	203	+304	31
2	Central Newcastle Butcher Boys	18	14	1	3	0	454	268	+186	29
3	Macquarie Scorpions	18	11	0	7	0	395	227	+168	22
4	Cessnock Goannas	18	11	0	7	0	419	285	+134	22
5	South Newcastle Lions	18	11	0	7	0	391	362	+29	22
6	Wyong Roos	18	8	0	10	0	356	382	−26	16
7	The Entrance Tigers	18	7	1	10	0	262	370	−108	15
8	Lakes United Seagulls	18	4	2	12	0	266	386	−120	10
9	Western Suburbs Rosellas	18	4	1	13	0	224	363	−139	9
10	Kurri Kurri Bulldogs	18	2	0	16	0	131	559	−428	4

Updated to match(es) played on 13 August. Source:
Rules for classification: 1) points; 2) point difference; 3) points scored

==== Ladder progression ====
- Numbers highlighted in green indicate that the team finished the round inside the top 5.
- Numbers highlighted in blue indicates the team finished first on the ladder in that round.
- Numbers highlighted in red indicates the team finished last place on the ladder in that round.
- Underlined numbers indicate that the team had a bye during that round.

Pos	Team	3	4	5	6	7	2	9	10	11	12	13	16	1	17	8	18	14	15
1	Maitland Pickers	6	8	10	12	14	14	14	17	19	19	21	25	25	27	27	29	29	31
2	Central Newcastle Butcher Boys	0	2	4	6	8	10	10	11	13	15	17	19	21	25	25	27	27	29
3	Macquarie Scorpions	2	2	4	6	6	8	12	12	14	14	16	16	18	20	20	20	20	22
4	Cessnock Goannas	4	6	6	6	6	6	10	10	12	14	16	20	20	22	22	22	22	22
5	South Newcastle Lions	2	2	4	6	8	10	12	14	16	16	18	18	18	18	18	20	20	22
6	Wyong Roos	2	4	4	6	8	8	8	10	10	12	12	12	12	12	12	14	14	16
7	The Entrance Tigers	0	2	4	4	6	6	8	8	8	10	10	14	14	14	14	15	15	15
8	Lakes United Seagulls	2	2	2	2	2	2	2	4	4	4	4	6	8	8	9	10	10	10
9	Western Suburbs Rosellas	0	0	0	0	0	0	0	2	2	4	4	4	4	6	7	7	9	9
10	Kurri Kurri Bulldogs	2	2	2	2	2	2	4	4	4	4	4	4	4	4	4	4	4	4

=== Season results ===
==== Round 1 ====
Home	Score	Away	Match Information
Home	Score	Away	Date and Time	Venue	Referee
Wyong Roos	16 – 12	The Entrance Tigers	Saturday, 26 March, 3:00pm	Morry Breen Oval	TBA
Cessnock Goannas	14 – 10	Western Suburbs Rosellas	Saturday, 26 March, 3:00pm	Baddeley Park	TBA
Central Newcastle Butcher Boys	10 – 24	Maitland Pickers	Sunday, 27 March, 3:00pm	St John Oval	TBA
Macquarie Scorpions	28 – 18	South Newcastle Lions	Saturday, 23 July, 2:00pm	Lyall Peacock Field	TBA
Kurri Kurri Bulldogs	10 – 50	Lakes United Seagulls	Saturday, 23 July, 3:00pm	Kurri Kurri Sports Ground	TBA

==== Round 2 ====
Home	Score	Away	Match Information
Home	Score	Away	Date and Time	Venue	Referee
Cessnock Goannas	44 – 16	Lakes United Seagulls	Saturday, 2 April, 3:00pm	Baddeley Park	TBA
Maitland Pickers	24 – 6	Western Suburbs Rosellas	Saturday, 2 April, 3:00pm	Maitland Sportsground	TBA
Kurri Kurri Bulldogs	0 – 30	Macquarie Scorpions	Sunday, 15 May, 3:00pm	Kurri Kurri Sports Ground	Tom Taylor
The Entrance Tigers	12 – 16	South Newcastle Lions	Sunday, 15 May, 3:00pm	EDSACC Oval	Brayden Hunt
Wyong Roos	14 – 22	Central Newcastle Butcher Boys	Sunday, 15 May, 3:00pm	Morry Breen Oval	Rob Bowen

==== Round 3 ====
Home	Score	Away	Match Information
Home	Score	Away	Date and Time	Venue	Referee
Wyong Roos	16 – 18	Lakes United Seagulls	Saturday, 9 April, 3:00pm	Morry Breen Oval	TBA
South Newcastle Lions	36 – 22	Central Newcastle Butcher Boys	Saturday, 9 April, 3:00pm	Townson Oval	TBA
Cessnock Goannas	10 – 20	Macquarie Scorpions	Saturday, 9 April, 3:00pm	Baddeley Park	TBA
Maitland Pickers	38 – 12	The Entrance Tigers	Saturday, 9 April, 3:00pm	Maitland Sportsground	TBA
Western Suburbs Rosellas	4 – 14	Kurri Kurri Bulldogs	Sunday, 10 April, 3:00pm	Harker Oval	TBA

==== Round 4 ====
Home	Score	Away	Match Information
Home	Score	Away	Date and Time	Venue	Referee
Cessnock Goannas	20 – 6	Kurri Kurri Bulldogs	Thursday, 14 April, 3:00pm	Baddeley Park	TBA
South Newcastle Lions	24 – 38	Wyong Roos	Friday, 15 April, 3:00pm	Townson Oval	TBA
The Entrance Tigers	12 – 10	Macquarie Scorpions	Friday, 15 April, 3:00pm	Cessnock Sports Ground	TBA
Lakes United Seagulls	6 – 28	Maitland Pickers	Saturday, 16 April, 3:00pm	Cahill Oval	TBA
Central Newcastle Butcher Boys	28 – 8	Western Suburbs Rosellas	Saturday, 16 April, 3:00pm	St John Oval	TBA

==== Round 5 ====
Home	Score	Away	Match Information
Home	Score	Away	Date and Time	Venue	Referee
Wyong Roos	12 – 22	Maitland Pickers	Saturday, 23 April, 3:00pm	Morry Breen Oval	Joey Butler
South Newcastle Lions	22 – 14	Cessnock Goannas	Saturday, 23 April, 3:00pm	Townson Oval	Louis Matheson
The Entrance Tigers	32 – 4	Kurri Kurri Bulldogs	Sunday, 24 April, 3:00pm	EDSACC Oval	Rob Bowen
Macquarie Scorpions	32 – 0	Western Suburbs Rosellas	Sunday, 24 April, 3:00pm	Lyall Peacock Field	Tom Taylor
Lakes United Seagulls	14 – 30	Central Newcastle Butcher Boys	Sunday, 24 April, 3:00pm	Cahill Oval	Brent Eyb

==== Round 6 ====
Home	Score	Away	Match Information
Home	Score	Away	Date and Time	Venue	Referee
Western Suburbs Rosellas	2 – 22	Wyong Roos	Saturday, 30 April, 3:00pm	Harker Oval	Joey Butler
Maitland Pickers	39 – 16	Cessnock Goannas	Saturday, 30 April, 3:00pm	Maitland Sportsground	Rob Bowen
Macquarie Scorpions	14 – 4	Lakes United Seagulls	Saturday, 30 April, 3:00pm	Lyall Peacock Field	Brad Kiehne
South Newcastle Lions	19 – 6	Kurri Kurri Bulldogs	Sunday, 1 May, 3:00pm	Townson Oval	Graham Stair
The Entrance Tigers	12 – 16	Central Newcastle Butcher Boys	Sunday, 1 May, 3:30pm	EDSACC Oval	Brayden Hunt

==== Round 7 ====
Home	Score	Away	Match Information
Home	Score	Away	Date and Time	Venue	Referee
Wyong Roos	34 – 30	Cessnock Goannas	Saturday, 7 May, 3:00pm	Morry Breen Oval	TBA
Western Suburbs Rosellas	4 – 24	The Entrance Tigers	Saturday, 7 May, 3:00pm	Harker Oval	Graham Stair
Lakes United Seagulls	20 – 26	South Newcastle Lions	Saturday, 7 May, 3:00pm	Cahill Oval	Kurt Grogan
Kurri Kurri Bulldogs	0 – 52	Maitland Pickers	Saturday, 7 May, 3:00pm	Kurri Kurri Sports Ground	Joey Butler
Central Newcastle Butcher Boys	24 – 10	Macquarie Scorpions	Sunday, 8 May, 3:00pm	St John Oval	Tom Taylor

==== Round 8 ====
Home	Score	Away	Match Information
Home	Score	Away	Date and Time	Venue	Referee
Wyong Roos	16 – 18	Macquarie Scorpions	Saturday, 21 May, 3:00pm	Morry Breen Oval	Rob Bowen
Maitland Pickers	38 – 10	South Newcastle Lions	Saturday, 21 May, 3:00pm	Maitland Sportsground	Joey Butler
The Entrance Tigers	4 – 28	Cessnock Goannas	Sunday, 22 May, 3:00pm	EDSACC Oval	Brayden Hunt
Central Newcastle Butcher Boys	28 – 12	Kurri Kurri Bulldogs	Tuesday, 19 July, 7:30pm	St John Oval	TBA
Western Suburbs Rosellas	0 – 0*	Lakes United Seagulls	Wednesday, 20 July, 8:00pm	Harker Oval	N/A

==== Round 9 ====
Home	Score	Away	Match Information
Home	Score	Away	Date and Time	Venue	Referee
Lakes United Seagulls	12 – 26	The Entrance Tigers	Friday, 27 May, 7:15pm	Cahill Oval	Tom Taylor
South Newcastle Lions	16 – 10	Western Suburbs Rosellas	Saturday, 28 May, 3:00pm	Townson Oval	Brett Eyb
Cessnock Goannas	38 – 22	Central Newcastle Butcher Boys	Saturday, 28 May, 3:00pm	Baddeley Park	Rob Bowen
Kurri Kurri Bulldogs	12 – 10	Wyong Roos	Saturday, 28 May, 3:00pm	Kurri Kurri Sports Ground	Kurt Grogan
Macquarie Scorpions	21 – 20	Maitland Pickers	Saturday, 28 May, 3:00pm	Lyall Peacock Field	Joey Butler

==== Round 10 ====
Home	Score	Away	Match Information
Home	Score	Away	Date and Time	Venue	Referee
Maitland Pickers	20 – 20	Central Newcastle Butcher Boys	Saturday, 4 June, 3:00pm	Maitland Sportsground	Tom Taylor
Lakes United Seagulls	20 – 12	Kurri Kurri Bulldogs	Saturday, 4 June, 3:00pm	Cahill Oval	Rob Bowen
The Entrance Tigers	8 – 24	Wyong Roos	Saturday, 4 June, 3:00pm	EDSACC Oval	Ethan Klein
South Newcastle Lions	26 – 16	Macquarie Scorpions	Sunday, 5 June, 3:00pm	Townson Oval	Joey Butler
Western Suburbs Rosellas	18 – 16	Cessnock Goannas	Sunday, 5 June, 3:00pm	Harker Oval	Brett Eyb

==== Round 11 ====
Home	Score	Away	Match Information
Home	Score	Away	Date and Time	Venue	Referee
South Newcastle Lions	46 – 14	The Entrance Tigers	Saturday, 11 June, 2:00pm	Townson Oval	Dillan Wells
Western Suburbs Rosellas	16 – 22	Maitland Pickers	Saturday, 11 June, 3:00pm	Harker Oval	Tom Taylor
Macquarie Scorpions	22 – 14	Kurri Kurri Bulldogs	Sunday, 12 June, 2:00pm	Lyall Peacock Field	Brayden Hunt
Lakes United Seagulls	6 – 24	Cessnock Goannas	Sunday, 12 June, 3:00pm	Cahill Oval	Rob Bowen
Central Newcastle Butcher Boys	30 – 10	Wyong Roos	Sunday, 12 June, 3:00pm	St John Oval	Joey Butler

==== Round 12 ====
Home	Score	Away	Match Information
Home	Score	Away	Date and Time	Venue	Referee
Macquarie Scorpions	10 – 11	Cessnock Goannas	Saturday, 18 June, 2:00pm	Lyall Peacock Field	Joey Butler
Kurri Kurri Bulldogs	7 – 28	Western Suburbs Rosellas	Saturday, 18 June, 3:00pm	Kurri Kurri Sports Ground	Brayden Hunt
The Entrance Tigers	20 – 16	Maitland Pickers	Sunday, 19 June, 3:00pm	EDSACC Oval	Tom Taylor
Lakes United Seagulls	8 – 20	Wyong Roos	Sunday, 19 June, 3:00pm	Cahill Oval	Rob Bowen
Central Newcastle Butcher Boys	12 – 10	South Newcastle Lions	Sunday, 19 June, 3:00pm	St John Oval	Louis Matheson

==== Round 13 ====
Home	Score	Away	Match Information
Home	Score	Away	Date and Time	Venue	Referee
Wyong Roos	10 – 32	South Newcastle Lions	Saturday, 25 June, 3:00pm	Morry Breen Oval	Rob Bowen
Kurri Kurri Bulldogs	0 – 50	Cessnock Goannas	Saturday, 25 June, 3:00pm	Kurri Kurri Sports Ground	TBA
Western Suburbs Rosellas	24 – 28	Central Newcastle Butcher Boys	Sunday, 26 June, 3:00pm	Harker Oval	TBA
Maitland Pickers	28 – 10	Lakes United Seagulls	Sunday, 26 June, 3:00pm	Maitland Sportsground	TBA
Macquarie Scorpions	50 – 0	The Entrance Tigers	Sunday, 26 June, 3:00pm	Lyall Peacock Field	TBA

==== Round 14 ====
Home	Score	Away	Match Information
Home	Score	Away	Date and Time	Venue	Referee
Cessnock Goannas	42 – 16	South Newcastle Lions	Saturday, 2 July, 3:00pm	Baddeley Park	Joey Butler
Maitland Pickers	28 – 16	Wyong Roos	Saturday, 2 July, 3:00pm	Maitland Sportsground	Brett Eyb
Kurri Kurri Bulldogs	8 – 30	The Entrance Tigers	Sunday, 3 July, 3:00pm	Kurri Kurri Sports Ground	Blake Williams
Central Newcastle Butcher Boys	28 – 14	Lakes United Seagulls	Tuesday, 26 July, 7:30pm	St John Oval	TBA
Western Suburbs Rosellas	16 – 14	Macquarie Scorpions	Wednesday, 10 August, 8:30pm	Grange Oval	TBA

==== Round 15 ====
Home	Score	Away	Match Information
Home	Score	Away	Date and Time	Venue	Referee
Central Newcastle Butcher Boys	26 – 6	The Entrance Tigers	Friday, 12 August, 7:30pm	St John Oval	Joey Butler
Wyong Roos	38 – 34	Western Suburbs Rosellas	Saturday, 13 August, 3:00pm	Morry Breen Oval	Rob Bowen
Cessnock Goannas	8 – 12	Maitland Pickers	Saturday, 13 August, 3:00pm	Baddeley Park	Louis Matheson
Lakes United Seagulls	8 – 30	Macquarie Scorpions	Saturday, 13 August, 3:00pm	Cahill Oval	Tom Taylor
Kurri Kurri Bulldogs	8 – 26	South Newcastle Lions	Saturday, 13 August, 3:00pm	Kurri Kurri Sports Ground	Tate Hoobin

==== Round 16 ====
Home	Score	Away	Match Information
Home	Score	Away	Date and Time	Venue	Referee
Cessnock Goannas	26 – 22	Wyong Roos	Saturday, 16 July, 3:00pm	Baddeley Park	Tom Taylor
Maitland Pickers	44 – 6	Kurri Kurri Bulldogs	Saturday, 16 July, 3:00pm	Maitland Sportsground	Kurt Grogan
Macquarie Scorpions	16 – 30	Central Newcastle Butcher Boys	Saturday, 16 July, 3:00pm	Lyall Peacock Field	Joey Butler
The Entrance Tigers	12 – 8	Western Suburbs Rosellas	Sunday, 17 July, 3:00pm	EDSACC Oval	Adam Sirriani
South Newcastle Lions	10 – 22	Lakes United Seagulls	Sunday, 17 July, 3:00pm	Townson Oval	Rob Bowen

==== Round 17 ====
Home	Score	Away	Match Information
Home	Score	Away	Date and Time	Venue	Referee
South Newcastle Lions	4 – 34	Maitland Pickers	Saturday, 30 July, 3:00pm	Townson Oval	Rob Morey
Cessnock Goannas	28 – 6	The Entrance Tigers	Saturday, 30 July, 3:00pm	Baddeley Park	Tom Taylor
Lakes United Seagulls	18 – 20	Western Suburbs Rosellas	Saturday, 30 July, 3:00pm	Cahill Oval	Rob Bowen
Kurri Kurri Bulldogs	0 – 56	Central Newcastle Butcher Boys	Saturday, 30 July, 3:00pm	Kurri Kurri Sports Ground	Tate Hoobin
Macquarie Scorpions	44 – 0	Wyong Roos	Saturday, 30 July, 3:00pm	Lyall Peacock Field	Joey Butler

==== Round 18 ====
Home	Score	Away	Match Information
Home	Score	Away	Date and Time	Venue	Referee
Wyong Roos	38 – 12	Kurri Kurri Bulldogs	Saturday, 6 August, 3:00pm	Morry Breen Oval	Kurt Grogan
Maitland Pickers	18 – 10	Macquarie Scorpions	Sunday, 7 August, 3:00pm	Maitland Sportsground	Tom Taylor
The Entrance Tigers	20 – 20	Lakes United Seagulls	Sunday, 7 August, 3:00pm	EDSACC Oval	Rob Bowen
Western Suburbs Rosellas	16 – 34	South Newcastle Lions	Sunday, 7 August, 3:00pm	Harker Oval	Joey Butler
Central Newcastle Butcher Boys	22 – 0	Cessnock Goannas	Sunday, 7 August, 3:00pm	St John Oval	Louis Matheson

=== Finals Series ===
Qualifying Final
2	Central Newcastle	18
3	Macquarie	36
4	Cessnock	26
5	South Newcastle	16

Major Semi-final
1	Maitland	42
3	Macquarie	14
Minor Semi-final
2	Central Newcastle	16
4	Cessnock	22

Preliminary Final
3	Macquarie	26
4	Cessnock	20

Grand Final
1	Maitland	40
3	Macquarie	4

Home	Score	Away	Match Information
Home	Score	Away	Date and Time	Venue	Referee
Qualifying & Elimination Finals
Central Newcastle Butcher Boys	18 – 36	Macquarie Scorpions	Saturday, 20 August, 2:00pm	St John Oval	Joey Butler
Cessnock Goannas	26 – 16	South Newcastle Lions	Sunday, 21 August, 2:00pm	Cessnock Sports Ground	Tom Taylor
Minor & Major Semi-finals
Maitland Pickers	42 – 14	Macquarie Scorpions	Saturday, 27 August, 3:00pm	Maitland Sportsground	Joey Butler
Central Newcastle Butcher Boys	16 – 22	Cessnock Goannas	Sunday, 28 August, 2:00pm	Townson Oval	Tom Taylor
Preliminary Final
Macquarie Scorpions	26 – 20	Cessnock Goannas	Saturday, 3 September, 2:00pm	Lyall Peacock Field	Joey Butler
Grand Final
Maitland Pickers	40 – 4	Macquarie Scorpions	Sunday, 11 September, 3:00pm	McDonald Jones Stadium	Joey Butler

== Southern Conference (Mojo Homes Illawarra Cup) ==
2022 Mojo Homes Illawarra Cup
- Duration: 7 May – 4 September 2022
- Teams: 8
- Minor premiers: Thirroul Butchers
- Wooden spoon: Corrimal Cougars
- Broadcast partners: Bar TV Sports
- Top points scorer: Max Devlin (134)
- Top try-scorer: Jason Gillard (13)

The 2022 Mojo Homes Illawarra Cup will feature 8 teams, up 3 from the 5 that competed in 2021.

=== Teams ===
Colours	Club	Presidents Cup Season	Home ground(s)	Head coach
	Collegians Collie Dogs	2nd season	Collegians Sports Stadium	TBA
	Corrimal Cougars	2nd season	Ziems Park	TBA
	Cronulla-Caringbah Sharks	1st season	Cronulla High School	TBA
	Dapto Canaries	2nd season	Groundz Precinct	TBA
	De La Salle Caringbah	1st season	Captain Cook Oval	TBA
	Helensburgh Tigers	1st season	Rex Jackson Oval	TBA
	Thirroul Butchers	2nd season	Thomas Gibson Park	TBA
	Western Suburbs Red Devils	3rd season	Sid Parish Park	TBA

=== Ladder ===
Pos	Team	Pld	W	D	L	B	PF	PA	PD	Pts
1	Thirroul Butchers	12	11	0	1	0	327	164	+163	22
2	Western Suburbs Red Devils	12	9	0	3	0	409	176	+233	18
3	Collegians Collie Dogs	12	9	0	3	0	380	151	+229	18
4	De La Salle Caringbah	12	8	0	4	0	315	229	+86	16
5	Helensburgh Tigers	12	5	1	6	0	262	306	−44	11
6	Dapto Canaries	12	2	1	9	0	252	414	−162	5
7	Cronulla-Caringbah Sharks	12	2	0	10	0	146	353	−207	4
8	Corrimal Cougars	12	0	2	10	0	176	474	−298	2

Updated to match(es) played on 13 August. Source:
Rules for classification: 1) points; 2) point difference; 3) points scored

==== Ladder progression ====
- Numbers highlighted in green indicate that the team finished the round inside the top 4.
- Numbers highlighted in blue indicates the team finished first on the ladder in that round.
- Numbers highlighted in red indicates the team finished last place on the ladder in that round.
- Underlined numbers indicate that the team had a bye during that round.

Pos	Team	3	4	5	6	1	7	8	11	2	12	13	14	9	10
1	Thirroul Butchers	2	4	6	8	8	10	12	14	16	18	20	22	22	22
2	Western Suburbs Red Devils	2	4	6	6	8	10	10	12	14	16	16	18	18	18
3	Collegians Collie Dogs	2	4	6	8	8	10	12	12	12	14	16	18	18	18
4	De La Salle Caringbah	2	6	6	8	8	8	10	12	14	14	16	16	16	16
5	Helensburgh Tigers	0	2	3	3	5	5	7	9	9	11	11	11	11	11
6	Dapto Canaries	0	0	0	2	2	2	2	2	2	2	3	5	5	5
7	Cronulla-Caringbah Sharks	0	0	0	0	0	2	2	2	4	4	4	4	4	4
8	Corrimal Cougars	0	0	1	1	1	1	1	1	1	1	2	2	2	2

=== Season results ===
==== Round 1 ====
Home	Score	Away	Match Information
Home	Score	Away	Date and Time	Venue	Referee
Cronulla-Caringbah Sharks	6 – 20	De La Salle Caringbah	Saturday, 14 May, 3:00pm	Cronulla High School	Charlie Suters
Collegians Collie Dogs	62 – 4	Corrimal Cougars	Saturday, 14 May, 3:00pm	Collegians Sports Stadium	Taylor Cleveland
Thirroul Butchers	10 – 24	Western Suburbs Red Devils	Saturday, 11 June, 1:15pm	Groundz Precinct	Ryan Jackson
Dapto Canaries	10 – 32	Helensburgh Tigers	Saturday, 11 June, 3:00pm	Groundz Precinct	William Damato

==== Round 2 ====
Home	Score	Away	Match Information
Home	Score	Away	Date and Time	Venue	Referee
De La Salle Caringbah	23 – 16	Collegians Collie Dogs	Saturday, 23 July, 3:30pm	Captain Cook Oval	Michael Ford
Helensburgh Tigers	12 – 14	Thirroul Butchers	Sunday, 24 July, 12:15pm	WIN Stadium	William Damato
Western Suburbs Red Devils	42 – 6	Dapto Canaries	Sunday, 24 July, 2:00pm	WIN Stadium	Taylor Cleveland
Corrimal Cougars	10 – 24	Cronulla-Caringbah Sharks	Sunday, 24 July, 3:45pm	WIN Stadium	Ryan Jackson

==== Round 3 ====
Home	Score	Away	Match Information
Home	Score	Away	Date and Time	Venue	Referee
De La Salle Caringbah	34 – 10	Corrimal Cougars	Saturday, 7 May, 3:00pm	Captain Cook Oval	Karra-Lee Nolan
Collegians Collie Dogs	30 – 16	Cronulla-Caringbah Sharks	Saturday, 7 May, 3:00pm	Collegians Sports Stadium	Ryan Jackson
Dapto Canaries	16 – 38	Thirroul Butchers	Saturday, 7 May, 3:00pm	Groundz Precinct	Taylor Cleveland
Helensburgh Tigers	10 – 54	Western Suburbs Red Devils	Saturday, 7 May, 6:00pm	Collegians Sports Stadium	William Damato

==== Round 4 ====
Home	Score	Away	Match Information
Home	Score	Away	Date and Time	Venue	Referee
De La Salle Caringbah	46 – 12	Dapto Canaries	Saturday, 21 May, 3:00pm	Captain Cook Oval	Taylor Cleveland
Cronulla-Caringbah Sharks	6 – 32	Helensburgh Tigers	Saturday, 21 May, 3:00pm	Cronulla High School	Brendan Mani
Thirroul Butchers	2 – 0	Collegians Collie Dogs	Saturday, 21 May, 3:00pm	Thomas Gibson Park	Ryan Jackson
Western Suburbs Red Devils	30 – 10	Corrimal Cougars	Sunday, 22 May, 3:00pm	Moss Vale Community Oval	Lachlan Greenfield

==== Round 5 ====
Home	Score	Away	Match Information
Home	Score	Away	Date and Time	Venue	Referee
Cronulla-Caringbah Sharks	6 – 48	Western Suburbs Red Devils	Saturday, 28 May, 1:00pm	Henson Park	Darren Van De Moosdyk
Corrimal Cougars	22 – 22	Helensburgh Tigers	Saturday, 28 May, 3:00pm	Loseby Park	Ryan Jackson
Collegians Collie Dogs	42 – 10	Dapto Canaries	Saturday, 28 May, 3:00pm	Collegians Sports Stadium	Taylor Cleveland
De La Salle Caringbah	24 – 28	Thirroul Butchers	Saturday, 28 May, 5:15pm	PointsBet Stadium	Tom Stindl

==== Round 6 ====
Home	Score	Away	Match Information
Home	Score	Away	Date and Time	Venue	Referee
Dapto Canaries	42 – 32	Corrimal Cougars	Saturday, 4 June, 11:30am	WIN Stadium	Taylor Cleveland
Helensburgh Tigers	14 – 28	De La Salle Caringbah	Saturday, 4 June, 1:15pm	WIN Stadium	Lachlan Greenfield
Thirroul Butchers	50 – 0	Cronulla-Caringbah Sharks	Saturday, 4 June, 3:00pm	WIN Stadium	Taylor Cleveland
Collegians Collie Dogs	46 – 16	Western Suburbs Red Devils	Saturday, 4 June, 4:45pm	WIN Stadium	Robert Morey

==== Round 7 ====
Home	Score	Away	Match Information
Home	Score	Away	Date and Time	Venue	Referee
De La Salle Caringbah	10 – 25	Western Suburbs Red Devils	Saturday, 18 June, 3:00pm	Captain Cook Oval	Michael Ford
Cronulla-Caringbah Sharks	32 – 22	Dapto Canaries	Saturday, 18 June, 3:00pm	Cronulla High School	Ryan Jackson
Helensburgh Tigers	4 – 30	Collegians Collie Dogs	Saturday, 18 June, 3:00pm	Rex Jackson Oval	Taylor Cleveland
Corrimal Cougars	12 – 50	Thirroul Butchers	Sunday, 19 June, 3:00pm	Ziems Park	Lachlan Greenfield

==== Round 8 ====
Home	Score	Away	Match Information
Home	Score	Away	Date and Time	Venue	Referee
De La Salle Caringbah	24 – 10	Cronulla-Caringbah Sharks	Saturday, 25 June, 3:00pm	Captain Cook Oval	Lachlan Greenfield
Western Suburbs Red Devils	24 – 26	Thirroul Butchers	Saturday, 25 June, 3:00pm	Sid Parish Park	Taylor Cleveland
Helensburgh Tigers	32 – 18	Dapto Canaries	Saturday, 25 June, 3:00pm	Rex Jackson Oval	Ryan Jackson
Corrimal Cougars	10 – 26	Collegians Collie Dogs	Sunday, 26 June, 3:00pm	Ziems Park	William Damato

==== Round 9 ====
Home	Score	Away	Match Information
Home	Score	Away	Date and Time	Venue	Referee
Cronulla-Caringbah Sharks	V	Corrimal Cougars	Cancelled	Gwawley Park	TBA
Thirroul Butchers	V	Helensburgh Tigers	Cancelled	Thomas Gibson Park	TBA
Collegians Collie Dogs	V	De La Salle Caringbah	Cancelled	Collegians Sports Stadium	TBA
Dapto Canaries	V	Western Suburbs Red Devils	Cancelled	Groundz Precinct	TBA

==== Round 10 ====
Home	Score	Away	Match Information
Home	Score	Away	Date and Time	Venue	Referee
Cronulla-Caringbah Sharks	V	Collegians Collie Dogs	Cancelled	Cronulla High School	TBA
Western Suburbs Red Devils	V	Helensburgh Tigers	Cancelled	Sid Parish Park	TBA
Thirroul Butchers	V	Dapto Canaries	Cancelled	Thomas Gibson Park	TBA
Corrimal Cougars	V	De La Salle Caringbah	Cancelled	Ziems Park	TBA

==== Round 11 ====
Home	Score	Away	Match Information
Home	Score	Away	Date and Time	Venue	Referee
Corrimal Cougars	6 – 56	Western Suburbs Red Devils	Saturday, 16 July, 3:00pm	Ziems Park	Taylor Cleveland
Collegians Collie Dogs	6 – 18	Thirroul Butchers	Saturday, 16 July, 3:00pm	Collegians Sports Stadium	Ryan Jackson
Dapto Canaries	26 – 36	De La Salle Caringbah	Saturday, 16 July, 3:00pm	Groundz Precinct	William Damato
Helensburgh Tigers	28 – 12	Cronulla-Caringbah Sharks	Saturday, 16 July, 3:00pm	Rex Jackson Oval	Brendan Mani

==== Round 12 ====
Home	Score	Away	Match Information
Home	Score	Away	Date and Time	Venue	Referee
Cronulla-Caringbah Sharks	8 – 44	Western Suburbs Red Devils	Saturday, 30 July, 3:00pm	Cronulla High School	Lachlan Greenfield
Thirroul Butchers	30 – 18	De La Salle Caringbah	Saturday, 30 July, 3:00pm	Thomas Gibson Park	Blake Williams
Dapto Canaries	20 – 30	Collegians Collie Dogs	Saturday, 30 July, 3:00pm	Groundz Precinct	William Damato
Helensburgh Tigers	42 – 6	Corrimal Cougars	Saturday, 30 July, 3:00pm	Rex Jackson Oval	Ryan Jackson

==== Round 13 ====
Home	Score	Away	Match Information
Home	Score	Away	Date and Time	Venue	Referee
De La Salle Caringbah	36 – 22	Helensburgh Tigers	Saturday, 6 August, 3:00pm	Captain Cook Oval	Adam Sirriani
Cronulla-Caringbah Sharks	12 – 27*	Thirroul Butchers	Saturday, 6 August, 3:00pm	Cronulla High School	N/A
Western Suburbs Red Devils	16 – 22	Collegians Collie Dogs	Saturday, 6 August, 3:00pm	Sid Parish Park	Ryan Jackson
Corrimal Cougars	28 – 28	Dapto Canaries	Saturday, 6 August, 3:00pm	Ziems Park	William Damato

==== Round 14 ====
Home	Score	Away	Match Information
Home	Score	Away	Date and Time	Venue	Referee
Western Suburbs Red Devils	30 – 16	De La Salle Caringbah	Saturday, 13 August, 3:00pm	Sid Parish Park	Michael Ford
Thirroul Butchers	34 – 16	Corrimal Cougars	Saturday, 13 August, 3:00pm	Thomas Gibson Park	Ryan Jackson
Collegians Collie Dogs	70 – 12	Helensburgh Tigers	Saturday, 13 August, 3:00pm	Collegians Sports Stadium	Lachlan Greenfield
Dapto Canaries	42 – 24	Cronulla-Caringbah Sharks	Saturday, 13 August, 3:00pm	Groundz Precinct	Taylor Cleveland

=== Finals Series ===
Minor & Major Semi-finals
1	Thirroul	8
2	Western Suburbs	24
3	Collegians	26
4	De La Salle	12

Preliminary Final
1	Thirroul	12
3	Collegians	24

Grand Final
2	Western Suburbs	10
3	Collegians	12

Home	Score	Away	Match Information
Home	Score	Away	Date and Time	Venue	Referee
Minor & Major semi-finals
Collegians Collie Dogs	26 – 12	De La Salle Caringbah	Saturday, 20 August, 3:00pm	Collegians Sports Stadium	Ryan Jackson
Thirroul Butchers	8 – 24	Western Suburbs Red Devils	Saturday, 20 August, 4:45pm	Collegians Sports Stadium	Taylor Cleveland
Preliminary Final
Thirroul Butchers	12 – 24	Collegians Collie Dogs	Saturday, 27 August, 3:00pm	Collegians Sports Stadium	Ryan Jackson
Grand Final
Western Suburbs Red Devils	10 – 12	Collegians Collie Dogs	Sunday, 4 September, 3:00pm	WIN Stadium	Ryan Jackson

Grand Final

Sunday, 4 September 2022
3pm (AEST)

Western Suburbs Red Devils	10 — 12	Collegians Collie Dogs
Tries: 1 Joey Dickson; Goals: 3 Mitch Porter 3	HT: 10–0; Highlights; Report	Tries: 2 Ben Rumble; Clive Brett; Goals: 2 Max Devlin 2

WIN Stadium, Wollongong
Referee: Ryan Jackson
Player of the Match: Blake Phillips (Collegians)

== Western Conference (Peter McDonald Premiership) ==
2022 Peter McDonald Premiership
- Duration: 10 April – 4 September 2022
- Teams: 13
- Minor premiers: Mudgee Dragons (Group 10); Dubbo CYMS (Group 11)
- Wooden spoon: Cowra Magpies (Group 10); Wellington Cowboys (Group 11)
- Broadcast partners: PAV Sports
- Top points scorer: Chad Porter (158)
- Top try-scorer: Jeremy Thurston (19)

The 2022 Peter McDonald Premiership will feature a merged competition between the former Group 10 and Group 11 competitions. The competition format will be two conferences, with the top 4 from each conference qualifying for an 8 team finals series. The winner of each conference will win the Group 10 and Group 11 Premierships.

=== Teams ===
==== Group 10 ====
Colours	Club	Presidents Cup Season	Home ground(s)	Head coach
	Bathurst Panthers	1st season	Carrington Park	Jake Betts
	Bathurst St Patricks	1st season	Jack Arrow Sporting Complex	Zac Merritt
	Cowra Magpies	1st season	Sid Kallas Oval	Jack Buchanan, Jack Nobes
	Lithgow Workies Wolves	1st season	Tony Luchetti Sportsground	Greg Alderson
	Mudgee Dragons	1st season	Glen Willow Regional Sports Stadium	Jack Littlejohn
	Orange CYMS	1st season	Wade Park	Daniel Mortimer
	Orange Hawks	1st season	Wade Park	Shane Rodney

==== Group 11 ====
Colours	Club	Presidents Cup Season	Home ground(s)	Head coach
	Dubbo CYMS	2nd season	Apex Oval	Shawn Townsend
	Dubbo Macquarie Raiders	1st season	Apex Oval	Alex Ronayne
	Forbes Magpies	1st season	Spooner Oval	Cameron Greenhalgh
	Nyngan Tigers	1st season	Larkin Oval	Jacob Neill
	Parkes Spacemen	1st season	Pioneer Oval	Jack Creith
	Wellington Cowboys	1st season	Kennard Park	Justin Toomey-White

=== Group 10 Ladder ===
Pos	Team	Pld	W	D	L	B	PF	PA	PD	Pts	Qualification
1	Mudgee Dragons	14	12	0	2	2	520	216	+304	28	Group 10 Premiers & Qualification to Finals Series
2	Orange CYMS	14	10	0	4	2	386	317	+69	24	Qualification to Finals Series
3	Bathurst St Patricks	14	8	1	5	2	378	234	+144	21	Qualification to Finals Series
4	Bathurst Panthers	14	7	1	6	2	418	336	+82	19	Qualification to Finals Series
5	Orange Hawks	14	7	0	7	2	240	317	−77	18	
6	Lithgow Workies Wolves	14	2	0	12	2	182	478	−296	8	
7	Cowra Magpies	14	2	0	12	2	218	544	−326	8	

Updated to match(es) played on 7 August. Source:
Rules for classification: 1) points; 2) point difference; 3) points scored

==== Ladder progression ====
- Numbers highlighted in green indicate that the team finished the round inside the top 4.
- Numbers highlighted in blue indicates the team finished first on the ladder in that round.
- Numbers highlighted in red indicates the team finished last place on the ladder in that round.
- Underlined numbers indicate that the team had a bye during that round.

Pos	Team	1	2	3	4	5	6	7	8	9	10	11	12	13	14	15	16
1	Mudgee Dragons	2	2	4	6	8	10	12	14	16	16	18	20	22	24	26	28
2	Orange CYMS	2	4	6	8	10	12	14	14	16	16	18	20	20	22	24	24
3	Bathurst St Patricks	2	2	4	4	4	6	7	9	9	11	11	13	15	17	19	21
4	Bathurst Panthers	2	4	4	4	6	8	9	11	13	13	15	17	17	17	17	19
5	Orange Hawks	2	4	6	6	6	6	8	10	10	10	10	12	14	14	16	18
6	Lithgow Workies Wolves	0	0	0	2	2	2	2	2	2	2	4	6	8	8	8	8
7	Cowra Magpies	2	2	2	4	6	6	6	6	8	8	8	8	8	8	8	8

=== Group 11 Ladder ===
Pos	Team	Pld	W	D	L	B	PF	PA	PD	Pts	Qualification
1	Dubbo CYMS	14	13	0	1	2	426	186	+240	30	Group 11 Premiers & Qualification to Finals Series
2	Forbes Magpies	14	9	1	4	2	416	282	+134	23	Qualification to Finals Series
3	Dubbo Macquarie Raiders	14	9	0	5	2	387	290	+97	22	Qualification to Finals Series
4	Parkes Spacemen	14	7	0	7	2	374	321	+53	18	Qualification to Finals Series
5	Nyngan Tigers	14	2	1	11	2	248	420	−172	9	
6	Wellington Cowboys	14	1	0	13	2	232	484	−252	6	

Updated to match(es) played on 7 August. Source:
Rules for classification: 1) points; 2) point difference; 3) points scored

==== Ladder progression ====
- Numbers highlighted in green indicate that the team finished the round inside the top 4.
- Numbers highlighted in blue indicates the team finished first on the ladder in that round.
- Numbers highlighted in red indicates the team finished last place on the ladder in that round.
- Underlined numbers indicate that the team had a bye during that round.

Pos	Team	1	2	3	4	5	6	7	8	9	10	11	12	13	14	15	16
1	Dubbo CYMS	0	2	4	6	8	10	12	14	16	18	20	22	24	26	28	30
2	Forbes Magpies	2	4	6	8	8	10	12	13	13	15	15	17	17	19	21	23
3	Dubbo Macquarie Raiders	0	2	4	4	6	8	8	8	10	12	14	16	18	20	22	22
4	Parkes Spacemen	0	2	2	2	4	6	8	10	12	14	16	16	16	16	16	18
5	Nyngan Tigers	0	0	0	2	2	4	4	5	5	7	7	7	7	9	9	9
6	Wellington Cowboys	0	0	0	0	0	2	2	2	2	4	4	4	6	6	6	6

=== Season results ===
==== Round 1 ====
Home	Score	Away	Match Information
Home	Score	Away	Date and Time	Venue	Referee
Mudgee Dragons	34 – 26	Dubbo Macquarie Raiders	Saturday, 2 April, 3:00pm	Glen Willow Regional Sports Stadium	Nathan Blanchard
Wellington Cowboys	12 – 32	Bathurst Panthers	Saturday, 9 April, 12:00pm	Kennard Park	Bryce Hotham
Nyngan Tigers	22 – 24	Orange CYMS	Saturday, 9 April, 2:30pm	Larkin Oval	Simon Hartas
Parkes Spacemen	20 – 30	Bathurst St Patricks	Saturday, 9 April, 2:30pm	Pioneer Oval	Justin Walker
Cowra Magpies	32 – 14	Lithgow Workies Wolves	Saturday, 9 April, 3:30pm	Sid Kallas Oval	Nathan Blanchard
Orange Hawks	24 – 22	Dubbo CYMS	Sunday, 10 April, 2:30pm	Pride Park	Billy Greatbatch
Forbes Magpies		BYE

==== Round 2 ====
Home	Score	Away	Match Information
Home	Score	Away	Date and Time	Venue	Referee
Cowra Magpies	20 – 38	Bathurst Panthers	Sunday, 24 April, 2:30pm	Sid Kallas Oval	TBA
Orange Hawks	20 – 18	Nyngan Tigers	Sunday, 24 April, 2:30pm	Wade Park	TBA
Wellington Cowboys	16 – 38	Orange CYMS	Sunday, 24 April, 2:30pm	Kennard Park	TBA
Forbes Magpies	22 – 20	Mudgee Dragons	Sunday, 24 April, 2:30pm	Spooner Oval	TBA
Lithgow Workies Wolves	6 – 24	Dubbo Macquarie Raiders	Sunday, 24 April, 2:30pm	Tony Luchetti Sportsground	TBA
Dubbo CYMS	42 – 22	Bathurst St Patricks	Sunday, 24 April, 2:30pm	Apex Oval	TBA
Parkes Spacemen		BYE

==== Round 3 ====
Home	Score	Away	Match Information
Home	Score	Away	Date and Time	Venue	Referee
Bathurst Panthers	30 – 32	Bathurst St Patricks	Sunday, 1 May, 3:00pm	Carrington Park	TBA
Orange CYMS	44 – 26	Cowra Magpies	Sunday, 1 May, 3:00pm	Wade Park	TBA
Dubbo Macquarie Raiders	41 – 22	Parkes Spacemen	Sunday, 1 May, 3:00pm	Apex Oval	TBA
Nyngan Tigers	18 – 30	Dubbo CYMS	Sunday, 1 May, 3:00pm	Larkin Oval	TBA
Wellington Cowboys	12 – 40	Forbes Magpies	Sunday, 1 May, 3:00pm	Kennard Park	TBA
Lithgow Workies Wolves	4 – 28	Orange Hawks	Sunday, 1 May, 3:00pm	Tony Luchetti Sportsground	TBA
Mudgee Dragons		BYE

==== Round 4 ====
Home	Score	Away	Match Information
Home	Score	Away	Date and Time	Venue	Referee
Orange Hawks	22 – 28	Orange CYMS	Sunday, 8 May, 3:00pm	Wade Park	TBA
Bathurst St Patricks	22 – 34	Cowra Magpies	Sunday, 8 May, 3:00pm	Jack Arrow Sporting Complex	TBA
Bathurst Panthers	18 – 32	Mudgee Dragons	Sunday, 8 May, 3:00pm	Carrington Park	TBA
Nyngan Tigers	16 – 12	Wellington Cowboys	Sunday, 8 May, 3:00pm	Larkin Oval	TBA
Forbes Magpies	24 – 22	Dubbo Macquarie Raiders	Sunday, 8 May, 3:00pm	Spooner Oval	TBA
Dubbo CYMS	28 – 6	Parkes Spacemen	Sunday, 8 May, 3:00pm	Apex Oval	TBA
Lithgow Workies Wolves		BYE

==== Round 5 ====
Home	Score	Away	Match Information
Home	Score	Away	Date and Time	Venue	Referee
Bathurst St Patricks	8 – 12	Mudgee Dragons	Sunday, 15 May, 3:00pm	Jack Arrow Sporting Complex	TBA
Bathurst Panthers	46 – 4	Orange Hawks	Sunday, 15 May, 3:00pm	Carrington Park	TBA
Orange CYMS	22 – 12	Lithgow Workies Wolves	Sunday, 15 May, 3:00pm	Wade Park	TBA
Wellington Cowboys	10 – 42	Dubbo Macquarie Raiders	Sunday, 15 May, 3:00pm	Kennard Park	TBA
Parkes Spacemen	40 – 16	Nyngan Tigers	Sunday, 15 May, 3:00pm	Pioneer Oval	TBA
Forbes Magpies	14 – 22	Dubbo CYMS	Sunday, 15 May, 3:00pm	Spooner Oval	TBA
Cowra Magpies		BYE

==== Round 6 ====
Home	Score	Away	Match Information
Home	Score	Away	Date and Time	Venue	Referee
Orange Hawks	16 – 28	Bathurst St Patricks	Sunday, 22 May, 3:00pm	Wade Park	TBA
Mudgee Dragons	54 – 6	Lithgow Workies Wolves	Sunday, 22 May, 3:00pm	Glen Willow Regional Sports Stadium	TBA
Bathurst Panthers	64 – 10	Cowra Magpies	Sunday, 22 May, 3:00pm	Carrington Park	TBA
Orange CYMS	BYE	Dubbo Macquarie Raiders
Nyngan Tigers	BYE	Wellington Cowboys
Parkes Spacemen	BYE	Forbes Magpies
Dubbo CYMS	BYE

==== Round 7 ====
Home	Score	Away	Match Information
Home	Score	Away	Date and Time	Venue	Referee
Cowra Magpies	14 – 16	Orange CYMS	Sunday, 29 May, 3:00pm	Sid Kallas Oval	TBA
Orange Hawks	20 – 18	Lithgow Workies Wolves	Sunday, 29 May, 3:00pm	Wade Park	TBA
Bathurst Panthers	26 – 26	Bathurst St Patricks	Sunday, 29 May, 3:00pm	Carrington Park	TBA
Parkes Spacemen	36 – 22	Dubbo Macquarie Raiders	Sunday, 29 May, 3:00pm	Pioneer Oval	TBA
Forbes Magpies	44 – 20	Wellington Cowboys	Sunday, 29 May, 3:00pm	Spooner Oval	TBA
Dubbo CYMS	38 – 12	Nyngan Tigers	Sunday, 29 May, 3:00pm	Apex Oval	TBA
Mudgee Dragons		BYE

==== Round 8 ====
Home	Score	Away	Match Information
Home	Score	Away	Date and Time	Venue	Referee
Lithgow Workies Wolves	8 – 34	Bathurst St Patricks	Saturday, 4 June, 3:00pm	Tony Luchetti Sportsground	TBA
Mudgee Dragons	66 – 6	Cowra Magpies	Sunday, 5 June, 3:00pm	Glen Willow Regional Sports Stadium	TBA
Orange CYMS	18 – 35	Bathurst Panthers	Sunday, 5 June, 3:00pm	Wade Park	TBA
Dubbo Macquarie Raiders	10 – 28	Dubbo CYMS	Sunday, 5 June, 3:00pm	Apex Oval	TBA
Nyngan Tigers	16 – 16	Forbes Magpies	Sunday, 5 June, 3:00pm	Larkin Oval	TBA
Wellington Cowboys	24 – 42	Parkes Spacemen	Sunday, 5 June, 3:00pm	Kennard Park	TBA
Orange Hawks		BYE

==== Round 9 ====
Home	Score	Away	Match Information
Home	Score	Away	Date and Time	Venue	Referee
Parkes Spacemen	34 – 14	Forbes Magpies	Sunday, 12 June, 2:30pm	Pioneer Oval	TBA
Orange Hawks	12 – 19	Bathurst Panthers	Sunday, 19 June, 2:30pm	Wade Park	TBA
Mudgee Dragons	20 – 14	Bathurst St Patricks	Sunday, 19 June, 2:30pm	Glen Willow Regional Sports Stadium	TBA
Dubbo Macquarie Raiders	28 – 18	Nyngan Tigers	Sunday, 19 June, 2:30pm	Apex Oval	TBA
Wellington Cowboys	14 – 24	Dubbo CYMS	Sunday, 19 June, 2:30pm	Kennard Park	TBA
Lithgow Workies Wolves	10 – 56	Orange CYMS	Sunday, 19 June, 2:30pm	Tony Luchetti Sportsground	TBA
Cowra Magpies		BYE

==== Round 10 ====
Home	Score	Away	Match Information
Home	Score	Away	Date and Time	Venue	Referee
Dubbo Macquarie Raiders	32 – 24	Orange CYMS	Saturday, 25 June, 2:30pm	Apex Oval	TBA
Bathurst St Patricks	22 – 0	Orange Hawks	Sunday, 26 June, 2:30pm	Jack Arrow Sporting Complex	TBA
Bathurst Panthers	26 – 40	Forbes Magpies	Sunday, 26 June, 2:30pm	Carrington Park	TBA
Nyngan Tigers	24 – 14	Cowra Magpies	Sunday, 26 June, 2:30pm	Larkin Oval	TBA
Parkes Spacemen	56 – 24	Lithgow Workies Wolves	Sunday, 26 June, 2:30pm	Pioneer Oval	TBA
Dubbo CYMS	16 – 10	Mudgee Dragons	Sunday, 26 June, 2:30pm	Apex Oval	TBA
Wellington Cowboys		BYE

==== Round 11 ====
Home	Score	Away	Match Information
Home	Score	Away	Date and Time	Venue	Referee
Dubbo CYMS	34 – 18	Forbes Magpies	Saturday, 2 July, 3:00pm	Apex Oval	TBA
Mudgee Dragons	28 – 12	Orange Hawks	Sunday, 3 July, 3:00pm	Glen Willow Regional Sports Stadium	TBA
Orange CYMS	10 – 6	Bathurst St Patricks	Sunday, 3 July, 3:00pm	Wade Park	TBA
Dubbo Macquarie Raiders	36 – 30	Wellington Cowboys	Sunday, 3 July, 3:00pm	Apex Oval	TBA
Nyngan Tigers	6 – 10	Parkes Spacemen	Sunday, 3 July, 3:00pm	Larkin Oval	TBA
Lithgow Workies Wolves	18 – 6	Cowra Magpies	Sunday, 3 July, 3:00pm	Tony Luchetti Sportsground	TBA
Bathurst Panthers		BYE

==== Round 12 ====
Home	Score	Away	Match Information
Home	Score	Away	Date and Time	Venue	Referee
Cowra Magpies	10 – 66	Forbes Magpies	Sunday, 10 July, 3:00pm	Sid Kallas Oval	TBA
Orange Hawks	26 – 12	Parkes Spacemen	Sunday, 10 July, 3:00pm	Wade Park	TBA
Mudgee Dragons	64 – 24	Nyngan Tigers	Sunday, 10 July, 3:00pm	Glen Willow Regional Sports Stadium	TBA
Wellington Cowboys	12 – 24	Lithgow Workies Wolves	Sunday, 10 July, 3:00pm	Kennard Park	TBA
Dubbo Macquarie Raiders	BYE	Orange CYMS
Bathurst St Patricks	BYE	Bathurst Panthers
Dubbo CYMS	BYE

==== Round 13 ====
Home	Score	Away	Match Information
Home	Score	Away	Date and Time	Venue	Referee
Bathurst St Patricks	48 – 0	Cowra Magpies	Sunday, 17 July, 3:00pm	Jack Arrow Sporting Complex	TBA
Mudgee Dragons	38 – 10	Bathurst Panthers	Sunday, 17 July, 3:00pm	Glen Willow Regional Sports Stadium	TBA
Orange CYMS	16 – 20	Orange Hawks	Sunday, 17 July, 3:00pm	Wade Park	TBA
Dubbo Macquarie Raiders	22 – 16	Forbes Magpies	Sunday, 17 July, 3:00pm	Apex Oval	TBA
Wellington Cowboys	38 – 20	Nyngan Tigers	Sunday, 17 July, 3:00pm	Kennard Park	TBA
Parkes Spacemen	18 – 24	Dubbo CYMS	Sunday, 17 July, 3:00pm	Pioneer Oval	TBA
Lithgow Workies Wolves		BYE

==== Round 14 ====
Home	Score	Away	Match Information
Home	Score	Away	Date and Time	Venue	Referee
Cowra Magpies	4 – 58	Dubbo CYMS	Sunday, 24 July, 3:00pm	Sid Kallas Oval	TBA
Bathurst St Patricks	46 – 12	Wellington Cowboys	Sunday, 24 July, 3:00pm	TBA	TBA
Orange CYMS	32 – 30	Parkes Spacemen	Sunday, 24 July, 3:00pm	Wade Park	TBA
Dubbo Macquarie Raiders	32 – 6	Bathurst Panthers	Sunday, 24 July, 3:00pm	Apex Oval	TBA
Forbes Magpies	36 – 14	Orange Hawks	Sunday, 24 July, 3:00pm	Spooner Oval	TBA
Lithgow Workies Wolves	16 – 42	Mudgee Dragons	Sunday, 24 July, 3:00pm	Tony Luchetti Sportsground	TBA
Nyngan Tigers		BYE

==== Round 15 ====
Home	Score	Away	Match Information
Home	Score	Away	Date and Time	Venue	Referee
Cowra Magpies	22 – 44	Mudgee Dragons	Sunday, 31 July, 3:00pm	Sid Kallas Oval	TBA
Bathurst St Patricks	40 – 4	Lithgow Workies Wolves	Sunday, 31 July, 3:00pm	Jack Arrow Sporting Complex	TBA
Bathurst Panthers	16 – 42	Orange CYMS	Sunday, 31 July, 3:00pm	Carrington Park	TBA
Nyngan Tigers	20 – 40	Dubbo Macquarie Raiders	Sunday, 31 July, 3:00pm	Larkin Oval	TBA
Forbes Magpies	20 – 12	Parkes Spacemen	Sunday, 31 July, 3:00pm	Spooner Oval	TBA
Dubbo CYMS	44 – 6	Wellington Cowboys	Sunday, 31 July, 3:00pm	Apex Oval	TBA
Orange Hawks		BYE

==== Round 16 ====
Home	Score	Away	Match Information
Home	Score	Away	Date and Time	Venue	Referee
Cowra Magpies	20 – 22	Orange Hawks	Sunday, 7 August, 3:00pm	Sid Kallas Oval	TBA
Bathurst Panthers	52 – 18	Lithgow Workies Wolves	Sunday, 7 August, 3:00pm	Carrington Park	TBA
Orange CYMS	16 – 56	Mudgee Dragons	Sunday, 7 August, 3:00pm	Wade Park	TBA
Parkes Spacemen	36 – 14	Wellington Cowboys	Sunday, 7 August, 3:00pm	Pioneer Oval	TBA
Forbes Magpies	46 – 18	Nyngan Tigers	Sunday, 7 August, 3:00pm	Spooner Oval	TBA
Dubbo CYMS	16 – 10	Dubbo Macquarie Raiders	Sunday, 7 August, 3:00pm	Apex Oval	TBA
Bathurst St Patricks		BYE

=== Finals Series ===
Qualifying / Elimination Finals
1	Dubbo	36
2	Orange	14
3	Bathurst	11
4	Parkes	12
3	Dubbo Macquarie	26
4	Bathurst	34
1	Mudgee	28
2	Forbes	34

Semi-finals
2	Orange	32
4	Parkes	16
1	Mudgee	28
4	Bathurst	16

Preliminary Finals
2	Forbes	40
2	Orange	30
1	Dubbo	34
1	Mudgee	4

Grand Final
1	Dubbo	16
2	Forbes	28

Home	Score	Away	Match Information
Home	Score	Away	Date and Time	Venue	Referee
Qualifying & Elimination Finals
Bathurst St Patricks	11 – 12	Parkes Spacemen	Saturday, 13 August, 2:00pm	Jack Arrow Sporting Complex	TBD
Dubbo Macquarie Raiders	26 – 34	Bathurst Panthers	Saturday, 13 August, 6:00pm	Apex Oval	TBD
Dubbo CYMS	36 – 14	Orange CYMS	Sunday, 14 August, 2:00pm	Apex Oval	TBD
Mudgee Dragons	28 – 34	Forbes Magpies	Sunday, 14 August, 3:00pm	Glen Willow Regional Sports Stadium	TBD
Semi-finals
Orange CYMS	32 – 16	Parkes Spacemen	Sunday, 21 August, 2:50pm	Wade Park	TBD
Mudgee Dragons	28 – 16	Bathurst Panthers	Sunday, 21 August, 2:50pm	Glen Willow Regional Sports Stadium	TBD
Preliminary Finals
Forbes Magpies	40 – 30	Orange CYMS	Sunday, 28 August, 2:30pm	Spooner Oval	TBD
Dubbo CYMS	34 – 4	Mudgee Dragons	Sunday, 28 August, 3:00pm	Apex Oval	TBD
Grand Final
Dubbo CYMS	16 – 28	Forbes Magpies	Sunday, 4 September, 3:00pm	Apex Oval	Billy Greatbatch

Grand Final

Sunday, 4 September 2022
3pm (AEST)

Dubbo CYMS	16 — 28	Forbes Magpies
Tries: 3 Ben Marlin; Bradley Pickering; Alex Bonham; Goals: 2 Bradley Pickering 2	HT: 4–10; Report	Tries: 4 Jake Grace 2 Toby Hurford; Alvin Maungaati; Goals: 6 Nick Greenhalgh 6

Apex Oval, Dubbo
Referee: Billy Greatbatch
Player of the Match: Mitch Andrews (Forbes)
