= University of Wollongong Titans =

Australian rugby league club, based in Wollongong, NSW

Club information
- Full name: University of Wollongong Rugby League Football Club
- Nickname(s): Books
- Short name: UOW Titans
- Colours: Red; Navy; White

Current details
- Ground(s): University Oval, Wollongong, New South Wales
- Competition: Illawarra Rugby League

The University of Wollongong Titans (or UOW Titans) is an Australian rugby league football team based in Wollongong. The club are a part of Country Rugby League and competes in the Illawarra Rugby League premiership. The club plays out of University Oval, Wollongong. The Titans wear red, navy and white jerseys. An earlier team from the University of Wollongong were nicknamed the "Books".

== See also ==
- University of Wollongong
