= Berkeley Eagles =

Australian rugby league club, based in Berkeley, NSW

Club information
- Full name: Berkeley Sports Rugby League Football Club
- Nickname: The Eagles
- Colours: Blue; Gold
- Founded: 1955; 71 years ago

Current details
- Ground: Berkeley Sports Ground, Berkeley, New South Wales
- Competition: Illawarra Rugby League
- 2022 IRL 2nd Division: 1st (of 6), Runners-Up

Records
- Premierships: 2010 (Reserves); 1969, 2005, 2023 (Division 2); 2002 (Under 18s)
- Runners-up: 2008 (Reserves); 2003 (Under 18s)
- Minor premierships: 2003 (Under 18s)

The Berkeley Eagles are an Australian rugby league football team based in Berkeley, a suburb of Wollongong. The club are a part of Country Rugby League and has competed in the Illawarra competition.

== History ==
=== Name and Emblem ===
The Eagles logo consists of the name "Eagles" in large font, with the name "Berkeley Sports" in smaller font above it. Underneath lies a picture of a white eagle. The font is in the team's colours.

The Berkeley Sports Eagles RLFC was formed in 1955 in the Illawarra juniors league and in 1965 a senior team was formed in Illawarra District Rugby League.

=== Colours ===
The team's colours are blue and gold.

== Honours ==
=== Team ===
==== Illawarra Rugby League Premierships ====
- Reserve Grade: 1

2010

- Division 2/Third Grade: 3

1969, 2005, 2023

- Under 18s: 1

2002

== See also ==
- Collegians Wollongong
- Corrimal Cougars
- Dapto Canaries
- Helensburgh Tigers
- Thirroul Butchers
- Western Suburbs Red Devils
