= Thirroul Butchers =

Australian rugby league club, based in Thirroul, NSW

Club information
- Full name: Thirroul Rugby League Football Club
- Nickname(s): The Butchers
- Colours: Blue; White
- Founded: 1913; 112 years ago

Current details
- Ground(s): Thomas Gibson Oval, Thirroul, New South Wales
- Competition: Illawarra Carlton League

Records
- Premierships: 10 (1940, 1954, 1973, 1995, 1999, 2003, 2008, 2012, 2014, 2023)
- Minor premierships: 5 (1987, 1995, 2003, 2008, 2022)

The Thirroul Butchers are an Australian rugby league football team based in Thirroul, a coastal town and suburb of Wollongong. The club was formed in 1913 and entered the Illawarra Rugby League, where it still competes today.

== History ==
The Thirroul Butchers were established in 1913, entering the third season of the Illawarra Rugby League competition. On 20 May 1913 Thirroul (at the time also known as "The Blues") competed in their first premiership match, with a 13-3 loss to Unanderra. The team listed was: Dansfield, A. Lacey, E.Lacey, Hopkinson, Coulton, Grace, McDonald, Ryan, Moore, Green, Fraser, Schalel and Clarke.

== Players ==
=== Notable former players ===
- Glen Air (1994-02 Illawarra Steelers, London Broncos, and West Tigers)
- Brent Grose (2001-08 Cronulla Sharks, South Sydney Rabbitohs, Warrington Wolves, and Sydney Roosters)
- Trent Waterhouse (Penrith Panthers (2002-2011), Warrington Wolves(2012-2014))
- Michael Howell (2002-04 St. George Illawarra Dragons)
- David Howell (2003-13 St. George Illawarra Dragons, Canberra Raiders, and London Broncos)
- Ryan Powell (2004-05 St. George Illawarra Dragons)
- Matt Prior (2008-20 St. George Illawarra Dragons and Cronulla Sharks)
- Max Bailey (2020 Sydney Roosters)
- Aaron Schoupp (2021- Canterbury Bulldogs and Gold Coast Titans)
- Ryan Couchman (2023- St. George Illawarra Dragons)
- Toby Couchman (2023- St. George Illawarra Dragons)
- Connor Muhleisen (2023- St. George Illawarra Dragons)

=== Leading Pointscores ===
Player	Tries	Goals	Field Goals	Points
John McCarthy	10	362	14	776
Bruce Smith	9	207	0	441
Lionel Wheatley	25	179	1	433
Mark Taylor	43	130	0	370
Ray Morgan	20	72	0	367
Shane Sciberras	11	154	0	356
Peter McGrath	1	163	0	329
Ron Wall	67	12	0	240
Bill Everett	5	98	1	211
Sean Minogue	12	74	0	197

== Honours ==
- Illawarra Rugby League Premierships: 8

1940, 1954, 1973, 1995, 1999, 2003, 2008, 2012

- Illawarra Minor Premierships: 4

1987, 1995, 2003, 2008

- CRL Challenge Cup: 1

2003

== See also ==
- Country Rugby League
- Illawarra Rugby League
- Berkeley Eagles
- Collegians Wollongong
- Corrimal Cougars
- Dapto Canaries
- Helensburgh Tigers
- Western Suburbs Red Devils
