= Helensburgh Tigers =

Australian rugby league club, based in Helensburgh, NSW

Club information
- Full name: Helensburgh Rugby League Football Club
- Nickname(s): The Tigers
- Colours: Gold; Black
- Founded: 1911; 114 years ago

Current details
- Ground(s): Rex Jackson Oval, Helensburgh, New South Wales
- Competition: Illawarra Rugby League
- 2015: 1st (champions)

Records
- Premierships: 4 (1986, 1988, 1993, 2015)

The Helensburgh Tigers are an Australian rugby league football team based in Helensburgh, a country town of the Illawarra region. The club are a part of Country Rugby League and has competed in the Illawarra Rugby League premiership since its inception in 1911.

== History ==
The Tigers are a foundation club of the Illawarra Rugby League, playing in the inaugural competition in 1911. Their first game was a 2–0 defeat to Wollongong. The club, however, didn't always compete in first grade since this time and not always did they have a reserve grade team following them. Scarborough fielded a reserves team which followed the Tigers between 1932 and 1935 before the Tigers dropped out of first grade (leaving Scarborough to field a reserves side behind Albion Park) in 1936.

=== Name and emblem ===
The Helensburgh team is represented by a tiger, and their emblem is similar to that of the old NSWRL team Balmain Tigers (before they merged with Wests).

=== Colours ===
Their colours, gold and black, are also similar to the old Balmain Tigers side.

=== Women's team ===
The Helensburgh Tiger Lillies was founded in 2005 Helensburgh Tiger Lilies Women's Rugby League Club are an Australian professional Women's rugby league football team based in Helensburgh, New South Wales.

== Notable players ==
Players that have played in the National and/or Sydney competitions:

- Sam Bremner
- Kezie Apps
- Jessica Sergis
- Damien Cook (2013– Dragons, Bulldogs and South Sydney Rabbitohs)
- Josh Starling (2012–17 Rabbitohs, Sea Eagles and Newcastle Knights)
- Justin Poore (2004–14 St. George-Illawarra Dragons, Parramatta Eels, Wakefield and Hull KR)
- Neil Piccinelli (1989–98 Illawarra Steelers, Hunter Mariners and Newcastle Knights)
- Dave Boughton (Sharks and Adelaide Rams back-rower of the 1990s)
- Phil Doran (Sharks player in the 80s)
- Scott Dudman (Sharks, Raiders forward)
- John Griffiths (Sharks lower grader)
- Garry Hammond (Sharks 1982–1985)
- George Jardine (St. George forward, played in their 1949 grand final win with a broken wrist)
- Trevor Kissell (Steelers)
- Allan Holmes (St George 1976–1977)
- Steve Kneen (Sharks, Australian Kangaroo in 1978)
- Bob Lawrence (Balmain forward in 1950s)
- Peter Phillips (Steelers, Balmain and St. George)
- Jack Russell (Balmain 1946)
- Brian Shannon (Western Suburbs Magpies 1957)
- Warren Thompson (Souths, North Sydney, and St. George 1963–70)
- Allan McKean (Easts, and Australian Kangaroo in 1970)
- Barry "Punchy" Nelson (NSW forward, Canterbury president during 1980s premierships)
- Randall Barge (St. George 1979)
- John Cox (Newtown 1964–66)

== Team honours ==
- Illawarra Rugby League First Grade Premierships: 4

1986, 1988, 1993, 2015

- Illawarra Rugby League Reserve Grade Premierships: 5

1952, 1960, 1961, 2012, 2014

- Clayton Cup: Nil

== See also ==
- Berkeley Eagles
- Collegians Wollongong
- Corrimal Cougars
- Dapto Canaries
- Thirroul Butchers
- Western Suburbs Red Devils
