= Collegians =

Australian rugby league club, based in Wollongong, NSW

Club information
- Full name: Collegians Rugby League Football Club
- Nickname: Collies
- Colours: Red; Black
- Founded: 1933; 93 years ago

Current details
- Ground: Lysaghts Oval, Wollongong, New South Wales (1,250)
- Chairman: Bruce Prior
- Coach: Nathan Fien
- Captain: Blake Phillips
- Competition: Illawarra Rugby League

Records
- Premierships: 12 (1967, 1987, 1996, 1997, 1998, 2004, 2005, 2007, 2013, 2017, 2019, 2022)
- Minor premierships: 10 (1986, 1988, 1996, 1998, 1999, 2001, 2002, 2004, 2005, 2013)

Collegians are an Australian rugby league football team based in Wollongong. The club are a part of Country Rugby League and compete in the Illawarra Rugby League premiership.

Originally known as CBC Old Boys, the club was founded in 1933. The Brothers Club was then admitted to the Illawarra 1st Grade competition in 1938.

In 2013 Collegians moved to the newly redeveloped former derelict site Lysaghts Oval, Figtree, complete with a 1,250 seat grandstand and new amenities. Collegians wear red and black jerseys and have won 9 minor premierships and 12 premierships. The Collegians Leagues club is a thriving club in North Wollongong, with the club also operating leagues clubs in Balgownie, Figtree and in the old Illawarra Leagues Club in the Wollongong CBD.

== Honours ==
=== Team ===
- Illawarra Rugby League First Grade Premierships: 12

1967, 1987, 1996, 1997, 1998, 2004, 2005, 2007, 2013, 2017, 2019, 2022

- Illawarra Rugby League Minor Premierships: 9

1986, 1996, 1998, 1999, 2001, 2002, 2004, 2005, 2013

=== Individual ===
Recent 10 Year Servicemen (# of games) = James Andraos (186), James Sara (127), Josh Porter (102)

== Players ==
Notable former players of the Collegians club include:

- Ron Costello
- Michael Bolt

== See also ==
- Berkeley Eagles
- Corrimal Cougars
- Dapto Canaries
- Helensburgh Tigers
- Thirroul Butchers
- Western Suburbs Red Devils
