= Port Kembla Blacks =

Defunct Australian rugby league club, based in Port Kembla, NSW

Club information
- Full name: Port Kembla District Rugby League Football Club
- Nickname: The Blacks
- Colours: Black; White
- Founded: 1914; 111 years ago
- Exited: 2017; 8 years ago

Former details
- Ground: Noel Mulligan Oval, Port Kembla, New South Wales
- Competition: Illawarra Rugby League

Records
- Premierships: 22 (1922, 1923, 1924, 1927, 1928, 1934, 1935, 1937, 1938, 1941, 1942, 1943, 1944, 1946, 1949, 1953, 1955, 1956, 1958, 1962, 1963, 1965)

The Port Kembla Blacks (or Port Kembla Rugby League Football Club) were a Rugby League team from Port Kembla, New South Wales, Australia that competed in the Illawarra Rugby League competition from 1914 to 2008 before moving to the Group 7 Rugby League competition from 2013 to 2017. After withdrawing from first grade competition in 2018, the team endures as a junior league rugby squad.

== History ==
The Port Kembla District Rugby League Football Club first entered the local rugby league competition in 1914, fielding a Third Grade team. The club wore an all-dark green jersey, playing on a home ground which was a section of the old golf links (the original Port Kembla Golf Club), located near Hill 60. The club played only one year before the First World War interrupted the competition.

In 1919, at the completion of World War I, the PKDRLFC resumed playing in the local 3rd Grade competition, this time playing in all-black jerseys (and becoming known as "The Blacks"). The Club entered 3rd Grade in 1919, Reserve Grade in 1920, and then First Grade in 1921. The club did not have to wait long to win their maiden First Grade title and start a history of strong and respected local rugby league teams. 1922, the year of this first victory, also became the first of three consecutive First Grade titles for "The Blacks".

The Club won five First Grade titles before adding a single white vee to their playing strip. The first top grade premiership in this jersey was won in 1934. It was not until the mid-1950s that the second white vee was added to the jersey to form the now famous Port Kembla "traditional" jersey. A few alternate strips were trialled in later years including a predominantly white jersey with horizontal black stripes in the mid-1980s, and the more modern sublimated strip from 1994. In 1999, the Club reverted to a more traditional playing strip, while still using the sublimated print jersey. The essence of the black jersey with two white vees was clearly evident, and still is today.

1946 saw the Port Kembla District RLFC win the Clayton Cup, presented to the Country Rugby League First Grade club with the best season record. The First Grade team in 1946 went through the season undefeated – a feat also achieved in 1928 and 1941. No other Illawarra rugby league club has achieved this feat since. The PKDRLFC enjoyed all three grades winning their respective premierships on three occasions – 1937, 1938 and 1958.

The Port Kembla Rugby League Football Club are credited with establishing the Port Kembla Leagues Club in the early 1950s, the club's major sponsor for most of its existence.

== Notable players ==
Port Kembla has produced five Australian representatives in Noel Mulligan, Frank Johnston, Charlie Hazleton, Ian Moir and John Simon. Another Three Port Kembla players have reached state representative honours – Terry Beckett, Terry Johnston and Chris Walsh – while Chris Walsh and John Cross have also captained the Illawarra Steelers. Other notable juniors include; Kane Linnett, Keith Lulia. James Storer captained and coached the team while also playing for Fiji.

A host of Port Kembla coaches have also made State and Australian teams including Ron Costello, Graeme Langlands and Brian Hetherington.

== Modern era ==
The Black's last senior premiership was achieved in 2010 when the team coached by Jason Sullivan and captained by Jon Koot defeated Mount Kembla in the VBR Cup Grand Final 22–10. The last First Grade Grand Final appearance was in 1980 when Port were defeated by Western Suburbs in a dour and windy tryless Grand Final to the score of 6–2.

Port Kembla won their most recent Under 18 titles in 2004 and again in 2006. The club also won their 13th Club Championship Trophy in 2004.

In 2007, Keith Lulia became the first Port Kembla junior since John Simon to progress to the NRL, debuting with the St George Illawarra Dragons in a 22–20 win over newcomers, the Gold Coast Titans. 2007 Under 18's centre, Kane Linnett, joined the Dragons top squad in 2008 before playing a leading role in helping the Sydney Roosters to the 2010 Grand Final. Linnett is currently contracted to the North Queensland Cowboys.

In 2008 Port Kembla had to pull out of first and reserve grade due to financial constraints and player availability. The club instead participated in the VB Cup competition (third grade), winning the minor premiership, before backing it up in 2010, taking it all the way to win the VBR Cup premiership.

The club re-entered First Grade in 2013, moving to the South Coast Group 7 competition, but withdrew at the end of the 2017 season when they could not fulfil the terms of their current on-loan arrangement from the Illawarra District Rugby League competition to Group Seven – where they were required to field a first and reserve grade side, as well as an under 18's side where possible.

The club continues to field junior league rugby squads and a girls tag team.

== Honours ==
=== Team ===
- Illawarra Rugby League First Grade Premierships: 22

1922, 1923, 1924, 1927, 1928, 1934, 1935, 1937, 1938, 1941, 1942, 1943, 1944, 1946, 1949, 1953, 1955, 1956, 1958, 1962, 1963, 1965

- Illawarra Rugby League Reserve Grade Premierships: 15

1933, 1935, 1936, 1937, 1938, 1950, 1954, 1955, 1957, 1958, 1965, 1966, 1967, 1968, 1977

- Illawarra Rugby League Third Grade Premierships: 16

1950, 1951, 1954, 1956, 1957, 1958, 1959, 1960, 1961, 1962, 1964, 1968, 1971, 1973, 1995, 2010

- Illawarra Rugby League Club Championships: 13

1950, 1951, 1953, 1954, 1957, 1959, 1960, 1962, 1964, 1966, 1968, 1969, 2004

- Clayton Cups: 1

1946
