= Corrimal Cougars =

Australian rugby league club, based in Corrimal, NSW

Club information
- Full name: Corrimal Rugby League Football Club
- Nickname: Cougars
- Colours: Green; Red
- Founded: 1912; 114 years ago

Current details
- Ground: Ziems Park, Corrimal, New South Wales
- Competition: Illawarra Rugby League

Records
- Premierships: 2 (1948,1974)

The Corrimal Cougars are an Australian rugby league football team based in Corrimal, a northern suburb of the city of Wollongong. The club are a part of Country Rugby League and has competed in the Illawarra Rugby League premiership since 1912.

== History, Colours and Emblem ==
The Corrimal Cougars were established in 1912 with the help from local miners. Traditionally the club has a working class history that has overcome many obstacles to provide an opportunity for local children and adults to enjoy Rugby League.

The Corrimal team is represented by a Cougar, and their emblem displays this creature in front of a red background in the shape of football. The name "Cougars" was chosen following a competition involving local school children. Robyn Fletcher of East Corrimal Public School was the winner. Underneath the name is the inscription "Est. 1912". Their colours are Green and Red.

The Cougars play out of Ziems Park, Corrimal.

== Ziems Park ==
Ziems park was officially opened as the home ground of the Corrimal Cougars Rugby League Club on Saturday 14 April 1934. With Corrimal defeating Thirroul 5–0 for the Grant Gup, the Grant Cup was donated by Corrimal Hotel publican John Grant for the occasion.

The Ziems family originally owned the land and used it as an abattoir for their local butcher shop but in the early 1930 Arthur Ziems, spoke to members of his family about donating the land to the rugby league club. The family agreed on condition that the club fence off the land to be used for rugby league.

In 1970 the ground underwent major improvements including the banks around the main oval with the help of the South Bulli Mine's community relation project to become regarded as one of the best grounds in the Illawarra district.

== Premierships ==
The Corrimal Cougars have won two First Grade Premierships (1948, 1974)

1948 – A Season to Remember

The Cougars won the first grade premiership in 1948.

Many new players joined the ’Red and Green’ at the beginning of the season. These included Ron Street from Warren, Jack Clare from Balmain and Harry Jardine from Wests. Bill ‘Dookie’ Burns was named First grade coach.

After a slow start the season two more important signing were completed before the third round, these players were Centre/Winger Arthur Clifford from Newtown and goal Kicking fullback Frank Bonner from South Sydney. Bonner had played 24 first grade games for the Bunnies in three seasons and Clifford had scored 5 tries in 6 top grade matches with the Jets.

At the end of the season the Cougars had played 18 matches, won 11, drew 1 and lost 6 including winning the fourth place playoff (10–4 v Thirroul), Semi-final (11–4 v Wollongong), Final (17–2 v Port Kembla) and Grand Final (22–7 v Port Kembla) in an amazing run to the Premiership from fifth place.

The Corrimal Cougars Grand Final Team was 1. Frank Booner 2. Arthur Clifford 3. Bill Kimbrey 4. Len Hickey 5. Norm Jarvis 6. Bob Bignell 7. Jack Clare (capt.) 8. Charlie Lacey 9. Les Murphy 10. Dale Schnieder 11. Jack Purdie 12. Ron Street 13. Andy Gallagher.

1974 – A long time between drinks

A second First Grade Premiership came to Corrimal during the Seventies when the Cougars were once again one of the Illawarra's top clubs. The 1974 First Grade Premiership capped of a great era for the Corrimal Club which also included 3 Reserve Grade Premierships (1971,1973,1975) and 3 Third Grade Premierships (1971,1974,1978).

Led by Former New Zealand Test Prop, Oscar Danielson as Captain Coach, the Cougars First Grade played 19 games Won 13, Lost 6. Including winning the Grand Final (22–8 v Wollongong) in front of an estimated 15000 strong crowd.

The Grand Final Team was 1. Kerry Burke 2. Grant Vickers 3. John Delaney 4. Ron Loomes 5. Les Dennis 6. John Bonham 7. John Mcdonald 8. Neil Gilmore 9. Wayne Purdie 10. Ken Tompson 11. Graham Ernst 12. Oscar Danielson (Capt) 13. Brian Milthorpe. With John Jansen and Russ Amatto coming off the bench.

== Players ==
=== Players ===
Players that have played in the National and/or Sydney competitions:

- John Bonham – Newtown Jets (1970–73)
- Oscar Danielson – Newtown Jets and New Zealand Rugby League Representative.
- Col Donohoe – Eastern Suburbs Roosters, South Sydney Rabbitohs, NSW, and Australian representative
- Tyson Frizell – Cronulla Sharks, St. George Illawarra Dragons, and Newcastle Knights NSW, Australian, and Welsh representative back rower.
- Charlie Hazelton – St. George Dragons – NSW and Australian representative
- Ben Hornby – St. George Illawarra Dragons – NSW and Australian representative
- John Jansen – St. George Dragons (1976–83)
- Luke Patten – Illawarra Steelers, St. George Illawarra Dragons, Canterbury Bulldogs, and Salford City Reds fullback.
- Don Tweddle – Cronulla Sharks (2003)
- Craig Young – St. George Dragons – NSW, and Australian representative
- Jock Delaney Balmain 1960

=== Corrimal Legends Team ===
In 2003 a Corrimal legends team was named.

Position	Player
Fullback	Jack O’Connell
Winger	Les Dennis
Centre	Glyn Kemp
Centre	Graeme Tondi
Winger	Charlie Hazelton
Five Eighth	John Bonham
Halfback	Col Donohoe
Lock	Paul Broughton
Second Row	John Jansen
Second Row	Ken Thompson
Prop Forward	Oscar Danielson
Hooker	Jock Delaney
Prop Forward	Craig Young

== Honours ==
=== Premierships ===
- Illawarra Rugby League: First Grade Premiership: 2

1948, 1974

- Illawarra Rugby League: Second Grade Premierships: 5

1924, 1971, 1973, 1975, 1983

- Illawarra Rugby League: Third Grade Premierships: 6

1971, 1974, 1978, 2012, 2013, 2014

- Illawarra Rugby League: Fourth Grade Premierships: 1

1970

- Illawarra Rugby League: Women's League Premierships: 2

2015, 2017, 2019

=== Club Championships ===
- Illawarra Rugby League: Club Championships: 3

1971, 1980, 1982

=== Life Members ===
- Alf Ramsay
- Len Heath
- Reg Eshman
- Alex Mulligan
- John Hutchinson
- Jack Cartwright
- Sid Graham
- Toby Wood
- Fred Hillyard
- Greg James
- Norm Jarvis
- Dennis Murada
- Mark ‘Legs’ Andrews
- Trevor Shoobert
- Phill Hedger
- Phil Jackson
- Terry Westblade
- Dave Adams

== See also ==
- Berkeley Eagles
- Collegians Wollongong
- Dapto Canaries
- Helensburgh Tigers
- Thirroul Butchers
- Western Suburbs Red Devils
