= Dapto Canaries =

Australian rugby league club, based in Dapto, NSW

Club information
- Full name: Dapto Rugby League Football Club
- Nickname(s): Canaries
- Short name: Dapto
- Colours: Gold; Blue
- Founded: 1911; 114 years ago
- Website: https://www.daptorlfc.com

Current details
- Ground(s): Groundz Precinct, Dapto, New South Wales
- Chairman: Dave Smith
- Coach: Blake Wallace
- Manager: Adam Blake
- Captain: Zane Howard
- Competition: Illawarra Rugby League

Records
- Premierships: 17 (1966, 1968, 1975, 1976, 1977, 1979, 1982, 1983, 1985, 1990, 1992, 1994, 2000, 2001, 2002, 2006, 2016)
- Minor premierships: 9 (1976, 1985, 1990, 1992, 1997, 2000, 2006, 2007, 2016)

The Dapto Canaries are an Australian rugby league football team based in the Wollongong suburb of Dapto. The club are a part of Country Rugby League and have competed in the Illawarra Rugby League premiership since its inception in 1911.

== History, colours and emblem ==
The Dapto Canaries were established in 1911 and are one of five founding clubs of the Illawarra Rugby League. However, it took the Canaries many decades to win their first title in 1966, and they have been strong competitors ever since. The Canaries won four premierships in five years during the 1970s, and a further three in each of the 80s and 90s. They won another three consecutive premierships between 2000 and 2002, again in 2006, with their final premiership coming in 2016. The Dapto team is represented by a yellow canary on their emblem, displayed in front of a blue background. The inscription "Dapto R.L.F.C." is displayed underneath. Their jerseys reflect this emblem with the use of gold on blue. The Canaries play at Groundz Precinct, Dapto.

== Players ==
=== Notable players ===
Players that have played or gone on to play in the Sydney Premiership, or selected for Country, New South Wales or Australia:

- Ronn Mann - Country (1948), NSW (1948)
- Bobby Dimond - Western Suburbs Magpies, Country (1948–49), NSW (1948–49), and Australian representative
- Peter Dimond - Western Suburbs Magpies (1958–67), Country (1957–69), NSW (1958–63), and Australia (1958–66)
- Lionel Simmonds - Country (1965–68)
- Noel Morris - Country (1969)
- Warwick Shirlaw (1971)
- Allan Fitzgibbon - Balmain Tigers (1968–70), Country (1971), NSW (1968), ~~Dapto captain/coach (1971–81), Illawarra Steelers coach (1982–84)
- Ted Goodwin - St. George Dragons (1972–78), Newtown Jets (1979), Western Suburbs Magpies (1980–82), Country (1971)
- Eric White - Country (1975)
- Brian Hetherington - Newtown Jets (1978–81), Illawarra Steelers (1982–88), Country (1975–84), NSW (1984–86)
- Ron Pilon - Country (1976), Newtown Jets (1977–78), Balmain Tigers (1980–81)
- Steve Morris - St. George Dragons (1979–86), Easts (1987–90), Country (1978–81), NSW (1978–86), Australia (1978)
- Brian Johnson - Country (1978), St. George Dragons (1979–85), Warrington Wolves (1985–88), Easts (1986),
- Michael Priest - Country (1979)
- David Walsh (1990-98 Illawarra Steelers)
- John Simon - Illawarra Steelers (1990–95), Sydney City Roosters (1996), Parramatta Eels (1997–99), Auckland Warriors (2000), Wests Tigers (2001), NSW (1992–97), Australia (1997)
- Dean Callaway (1991-00 Illawarra Steelers, London Broncos)
- Paul McGregor - Illawarra Steelers (1991–98), St. George Illawarra Dragons (1999–2001), NSW (1992–1998), Australia (1994–97)
- Terry Lamey (1997–02 Illawarra Steelers, St George Illawarra Dragons, South Sydney Rabbitohs)
- Chris Leikvoll (1997-07 Illawarra Steelers, St George Illawarra Dragons)
- Craig Fitzgibbon (1998-09 Illawarra Steelers, St. George Illawarra Dragons, Sydney Roosters)
- Daniel Mathews - Country (2000)
- Adam Blake - Country (2001–03)
- Mathew Head (2003–09 St George Illawarra Dragons, West Tigers, Hull F.C.)
- Shaun Wessell (2003 Cronulla Sharks)
- Dean Young (2003–13 St George Illawarra Dragons)
- Steve Southern (2004–11 North Queensland Cowboys, Newcastle Knights)
- Dan Hunt (2007–14 St George Illawarra Dragons)
- Michael Malone [Moorebank Rams, Milperra Colts, Menai Aquinas, Moorebank schoolboys]
- Blake Wallace (2017– Toronto Wolfpack)
- Shannon Wakeman (2017– Huddersfield Giants)
- Blake Lawrie (2017– St George Illawarra Dragons)
- Paul Rose English former professional rugby league footballer who played in the 1960s, 1970s and 1980s. He played at representative level for Great Britain, England and Yorkshire, and at club level for Hull Kingston Rovers and Hull F.C.
- Josh Davies (2010- CCRLRA)
- Tyrell Sloan (2021 St George Illawarra Dragons)
- Joseph Leilua (2023 Canberra Raiders)

== Honours ==
=== Team ===
- Illawarra Rugby League First Grade Premierships: 17

1966, 1968, 1975, 1976, 1977, 1979, 1982, 1983, 1985, 1990, 1992, 1994, 2000, 2001, 2002, 2006, 2016

- Illawarra Rugby League Club Championships: 9

1976, 1985, 1990, 1992, 1997, 2000, 2006, 2007, 2016

== See also ==
- Berkeley Eagles
- Collegians Wollongong
- Corrimal Cougars
- Helensburgh Tigers
- Thirroul Butchers
- Western Suburbs Red Devils
