= Western Suburbs Red Devils =

Australian rugby league club, based in Figtree, Wollongong, NSW

Club information
- Full name: Western Suburbs Rugby League Football Club
- Nickname(s): Red Devils
- Short name: West
- Colours: Red; Blue
- Founded: 1949; 76 years ago
- Website: http://www.westsdevils.com.au/home

Current details
- Ground(s): Figtree Oval (Sid Parrish Park), Figtree, New South Wales
- Competition: Illawarra Rugby League

Records
- Premierships: 16 (1957, 1959, 1969, 1970, 1971, 1972, 1978, 1980, 1981, 1984, 1989, 1991, 2009, 2010, 2011, 2018)
- Runners-up: 10 (1958, 1973, 1979, 1983, 1993, 1995, 2005, 2012, 2016, 2022)
- Minor premierships: 9 (1977, 1978, 1983, 1991, 2009, 2010, 2011, 2012, 2018)

The Western Suburbs Red Devils (Wests Illawarra, Wests Wollongong, Wests Red Devils or simply Wests Devils) are an Australian rugby league football team based in Figtree, a suburb of Wollongong. The club is a member of the Country Rugby League and compete in the Illawarra Rugby League premiership. The club play out of Figtree Oval, Figtree. Wests wear red and blue jerseys and have won 16 premierships. Wests Illawarra Leagues club is a thriving club in Unanderra.

== History ==
Wests formed in 1949 with the amalgamation of clubs in the district (primarily Unanderra and Mount Keira). The Leagues Club was established in Unanderra and opened in 1956. The Red Devils won the premiership the following year with a 22–6 win over Wollongong. They repeated this effort in 1959 when they defeated Northern Suburbs 12–6 in the Grand Final.

With Don Parish at the helm as captain-coach, Wests took back-to-back titles in 1969–70. Warren Ryan continued this trend the following two seasons when he took over, defeating Thirroul (18–11 in 1971, and 23–9 in 1972). Cronulla Sharks legend, Tommy Bishop also guided the team to a premiership in 1978.

Wests were again premiers two years later, winning in 1980 and 1981. The following year the Illawarra Steelers were accepted into the NSWRL premiership, thus all the sides in the league became feeder clubs to this side. Being premiers, a large portion of the Red Devils were contracted to the Steelers. This made life difficult in the 1982 premiership for the Red Devils, but within three years they won another premiership. They followed this up with another in 1989 and 1991.

The Red Devils went through a dry spell from here, not winning the premiership for 18 years. They came close during Brendon Reeves' reign in 2005. They did eventually break the drought in 2009 when they defeated reigning premiers, Thirroul, 14–4 under coach Paul McGregor in his first season. They went back-to-back with a 24–0 win in 2010, again over the Butchers. In 2011, Wests made it a treble of grand final wins with a 34–24 victory over Helensburgh. The Red Devils were unable to match the team of the 60-70s that won four consecutive premierships when they lost 20–16 to finals rivals Thirroul in the 2012 grand final.

In 2018 Wests found enough to hold off Thirroul 18–16 to claim their first Illawarra League crown in eight seasons. The Devils ran in four first-half tries to lead 18–0 at the break before a second-half fightback saw the Butchers get within two with 18 minutes to play.

== Players ==
=== Notable former players ===
Player	Country Firsts		City Firsts		Country Origin		New South Wales		Australia
Player	Years	Apps	Years	Apps	Years	Apps	Years	Apps	Years	Apps
Bob Fulton			1967–1978	9			1971–72, 1974	6	1968–78	51
Graham Lye	1969–70
David Waite	1973	1					1973–74	2	1973–74	6
John Dorahy	1972–73	2	1980	1	1988	1	1979	2	1978	2
Royce Ayliffe							1982	3	1981	1
Garry Jack	1986	1	1984–85	2	1987	1	1984–89	17	1984–88	29
Steve Roach	1986-86	2	1984	1	1988, 1990	2	1984–86, 1988, 1990–91	17	1985–86, 1988–91	27
Jason Ryles					2001, 2003, 2005	3	2002–05	8	2001–02, 2004–05	15
Brett Stewart					2007	1	2007–12	8	2007	1
Glenn Stewart					2008, 2010–11	3	2009, 2012	5	2008–09	5
Bruce Olive	1959–62						1958
Allan Maddalena							1969
Brian Hetherington	1977, 1984	2	1986	1			1984, 1986	2
Brett Rodwell					1991, 1993, 1995	3	1995	1

- Beau Ryan
- Jackson Hastings (2014– Sydney Roosters)
- George Jennings

Players in bold represent current NRL players.

== Honours ==
=== Team ===
- Illawarra Rugby League First Grade Premierships: 16

1957, 1959, 1969, 1970, 1971, 1972, 1978, 1980, 1981, 1984, 1989, 1991, 2009, 2010, 2011, 2018

- Illawarra Rugby League Reserve Grade Premierships: 8

1985,1964, 2002, 2003, 2004, 2005, 2007, 2008, 2011

- Illawarra Rugby League Under-18's Premierships: 7

1962, 1992, 2003, 2005, 2011, 2016, 2018

== See also ==
- Berkeley Eagles
- Collegians Wollongong
- Corrimal Cougars
- Dapto Canaries
- Helensburgh Tigers
- Thirroul Butchers
