= 2022 Group 7 Rugby League season =

The 2022 Group 7 Rugby League season was the 110th season of rugby league in the New South Wales country region of Group 7.

== Group 7 All Stars Match ==
=== Men's Open ===
12 February 2022
15:00

Group 7 All Stars	52 – 6	Group 7 Indigenous All Stars
Tries: J. Brooker (3), M. Carroll, B. Grant, Z. Weatherall, D. Efaraimo, J. Kamire, H. Holland, J. Scott; Goals: B. Grant (6)	Report; Full Match	Tries: J. McLeod; Goals: J. Brisbane

Rugby Park, Nowra
Referee: P. Lees

Team lists:

FB	1	Jake Horton
WG	2	Jye Brooker
CE	3	Kayne Brennan
CE	4	Hamish Holland
WG	5	Donte Efaraimo
FE	6	Blair Grant
HB	7	Matt Carroll
PR	8	Judd Colyer
HK	9	Nathan Ford (c)
PR	10	Tom Warner
SR	11	Tom Angel
SR	12	Matt Delblanco
LK	13	Kieron Rankmore
Substitutes:
IC	14	Jimmy Scott
IC	15	Zaan Weatherall
IC	16	Jake Taylor
IC	17	Tyler Clarke
IC	19	Jake Kamire
Coach:
Abed Atallah Jade Lucas

FB	1	Jake Gould
WG	2	Darnell Walker
CE	3	Ryan James
CE	4	Tremayne Chatfield
WG	5	Dwayne Longbottom
FE	6	Jake Brisbane
HB	7	Jack Walsh
PR	8	Liam Ryan
HK	9	Nathan Deaves
PR	10	PJ Thornton
SR	11	Buddy Braddick
SR	12	Tyson Simpson
LK	13	Mason Harrison (c)
Substitutes:
IC	14	George Campbell
IC	15	Liam Henry
IC	16	Jarrah McLeod
IC	17	Ty Cloose
Coach:
Mason Harrison

=== Ladies' League Tag ===
12 February 2022
13:00

Group 7 All Stars	16 – 6	Group 7 Indigenous All Stars
Tries: T. Atfield, M. Singleton, M. Lee, C. Egan	Report; Full Match	Tries: R. Chapman; Goals: K. Locke

Rugby Park, Nowra
Referee: M. Goroch

Team lists:

FB	1	Bronte Girdler
WG	9	Macey Lee
CE	15	Madi Singleton
CE	16	Loagan Garrett
WG	4	Ella Stewart
FE	13	Riley Scott
HB	3	Talia Atfield (vc)
PR	6	Alanna Smith
HK	11	Ebony Murray (c)
PR	7	Paige McCallum
SR	17	Chloe Egan
Substitutes:
SR	5	Carly Abbott
LK	12	Abbey Montgomery
IC	2	Olivia Berry
Coach:
Carly Ryan

FB	1	Allira Simon
WG	2	Tyrah Wellington
CE	3	Katelyn Farrell
CE	4	Khalesha Falzon
WG	5	Shaylee Meehan
FE	6	Mishelle Toms
HB	7	Krissy Falzon (c)
PR	8	Ainsley Aldridge
HK	9	Rhiannon Chapman
PR	10	Kaitie Locke
SR	11	Maddy Farrell
Substitutes:
SR	12	Shantelle Locke
LK	13	Ella Simon
IC	14	Cassidy Morris
IC	15	Emily Beetson
IC	16	Jada Brown
Coach:
Krissy Falzon

== 1st grade ==
2022 Group 7 Rugby League 1st Grade
- Duration: 9 April – 25 September
- Teams: 10
- Broadcast partners: Bar TV Sports

=== Teams ===
Colours	Club	Season	Home ground(s)	Head coach(s)	2021 position
	Albion Park-Oak Flats Eagles	80th season	Centenary Field	Jay Efaraimo	3rd
	Berry-Shoalhaven Heads Magpies	102nd season	Berry Showground	Mitchell Allgood	N/A
	Gerringong Lions	99th season	Michael Cronin Oval	Scott Stewart	1st
	Jamberoo Superoos	67th season	Kevin Walsh Oval	Jono Dallas	2nd
	Kiama Knights	100th season	Kiama Showground	Marc Laird	5th
	Milton-Ulladulla Bulldogs	71st season	Bill Andriske Oval	Mason Stewart	9th
	Nowra-Bomaderry Jets	14th season	Bomaderry Sports Complex	Ben Wellington	7th
	Shellharbour Sharks	82nd season	Ron Costello Oval	Abed Atallah	6th
	Stingrays of Shellharbour	6th season	Flinders Field		8th
	Warilla-Lake South Gorillas	54th season	Cec Glenholmes Oval		4th

Note: The Southern Highlands Storm was initially accepted for first grade but opted to only process a Regan Cup (3rd grade) and U18's teams.

=== Ladder ===
Pos	Team	Pld	W	D	L	B	PF	PA	PD	Pts
1	Shellharbour Sharks	2	2	0	0	0	64	12	+52	4
2	Warilla-Lake South Gorillas	2	2	0	0	0	78	32	+46	4
3	Kiama Knights	2	2	0	0	0	64	18	+46	4
4	Gerringong Lions	2	2	0	0	0	50	18	+32	4
5	Stingrays of Shellharbour	2	1	0	1	0	38	32	+6	2
6	Jambaroo Superoos	2	1	0	1	0	18	34	-16	2
7	Milton-Ulladulla Bulldogs	2	0	0	2	0	36	62	-26	0
8	Berry-Shoalhaven Heads Magpies	2	0	0	2	0	36	64	-28	0
9	Albion Park-Oak Flats Eagles	2	0	0	2	0	16	66	-50	0
10	Nowra-Bomaderry Jets	2	0	0	2	0	6	68	-62	0

=== Regular season ===
==== Round 1 ====
Home	Score	Away	Match information			
Home	Score	Away	Date and time	Venue	Referee	Video replay
Stingrays of Shellharbour	P – P	Gerringong Lions	TBC	Flinders Field		
Nowra-Bomaderry Jets	P – P	Albion Park-Oak Flats Eagles	TBC	Bomaderry Sports Complex		
Milton-Ulladulla Bulldogs	P – P	Berry-Shoalhaven Heads Magpies	TBC	Bill Andriske Oval		
Shellharbour Sharks	P – P	Jambaroo Superoos	TBC	Ron Costello Oval		
Warilla-Lake South Gorillas	P – P	Kiama Knights	TBC	Cec Glenholmes Oval		

- Round 1 was washed out and postponed to the washout catch up round on the weekend of 30/31 July.

==== Round 2 ====
Home	Score	Away	Match information			
Home	Score	Away	Date and time	Venue	Referee	Video replay
Albion Park-Oak Flats Eagles	6 – 22	Shellharbour Sharks	Saturday, 23 April, 15:00	Centenary Field	B. Warren	
Berry-Shoalhaven Heads Magpies	18 – 26	Stingrays of Shellharbour	Saturday, 23 April, 15:00	Bomaderry Sports Complex	P. Lees	
Gerringong Lions	22 – 4	Jambaroo Superoos	Saturday, 23 April, 15:00	Michael Cronin Oval	R. Micallef	
Kiama Knights	26 – 0	Nowra-Bomaderry Jets	Sunday, 24 April, 15:00	Kiama Showground	T. Jordan	
Milton-Ulladulla Bulldogs	22 – 34	Warilla-Lake South Gorillas	Sunday, 24 April, 15:00	Bill Andriske Oval	W. Drury	

==== Round 3 ====
Home	Score	Away	Match information			
Home	Score	Away	Date and time	Venue	Referee	Video replay
Jambaroo Superoos	14 – 12	Stingrays of Shellharbour	Saturday, 30 April, 15:00	Kevin Walsh Oval	T. Jordan	
Shellharbour Sharks	42 – 6	Nowra-Bomaderry Jets	Saturday, 30 April, 15:00	Ron Costello Oval	W. Drury	
Berry-Shoalhaven Heads Magpies	18 – 38	Kiama Knights	Sunday, 1 May, 15:00	Kiama Showground	B. Warren	
Milton-Ulladulla Bulldogs	14 – 28	Gerringong Lions	Sunday, 1 May, 15:00	Bill Andriske Oval	P. Lees	
Warilla-Lake South Gorillas	44 – 10	Albion Park-Oak Flats Eagles	Sunday, 1 May, 15:00	Cec Glenholmes Oval	R. Micallef	

==== Round 4 ====
Home	Score	Away	Match information			
Home	Score	Away	Date and time	Venue	Referee	Video replay
Gerringong Lions	32 – 20	Shellharbour Sharks	Saturday, 7 May, 15:00	Michael Cronin Oval	P. Lees	
Jambaroo Superoos	26 – 8	Albion Park-Oak Flats Eagles	Saturday, 7 May, 15:00	Kevin Walsh Oval	B. Warren	
Milton-Ulladulla Bulldogs	18 – 18	Kiama Knights	Saturday, 7 May, 15:00	Bill Andriske Oval	R. Micallef	
Nowra-Bomaderry Jets	20 – 20	Berry-Shoalhaven Heads Magpies	Sunday, 8 May, 15:00	Bomaderry Sports Complex	T. Jordan	
Stingrays of Shellharbour	14 – 26	Warilla-Lake South Gorillas	Sunday, 8 May, 15:00	Flinders Field	W. Drury	

==== Round 5 ====
Home	Score	Away	Match information			
Home	Score	Away	Date and time	Venue	Referee	Video replay
Gerringong Lions	P – P	Nowra-Bomaderry Jets	TBC	Michael Cronin Oval		
Milton-Ulladulla Bulldogs	P – P	Shellharbour Sharks	TBC	Bill Andriske Oval		
Albion Park-Oak Flats Eagles	P – P	Berry-Shoalhaven Heads Magpies	TBC	Centenary Field		
Stingrays of Shellharbour	P – P	Kiama Knights	TBC	Flinders Field		
Warilla-Lake South Gorillas	P – P	Jambaroo Superoos	TBC	Cec Glenholmes Oval		

==== Round 6 ====
Home	Score	Away	Match information			
Home	Score	Away	Date and time	Venue	Referee	Video replay
Albion Park-Oak Flats Eagles	–	Milton-Ulladulla Bulldogs	Saturday, 21 May, 15:00	Centenary Field	J. Borg	
Kiama Knights	–	Gerringong Lions	Saturday, 21 May, 15:00	Kiama Showground	T. Jordan	
Shellharbour Sharks	–	Stingrays of Shellharbour	Saturday, 21 May, 15:00	Ron Costello Oval	W. Drury	
Nowra-Bomaderry Jets	–	Jambaroo Superoos	Sunday, 22 May, 15:00	Bomaderry Sports Complex	B. Warren	
Warilla-Lake South Gorillas	–	Berry-Shoalhaven Heads Magpies	Sunday, 22 May, 15:00	Cec Glenholmes Oval	P. Lees	

==== Round 7 ====
Home	Score	Away	Match information			
Home	Score	Away	Date and time	Venue	Referee	Video replay
Jambaroo Superoos	–	Milton-Ulladulla Bulldogs	Saturday, 28 May, 15:00	Kevin Walsh Oval		
Shellharbour Sharks	–	Berry-Shoalhaven Heads Magpies	Saturday, 28 May, 15:00	Ron Costello Oval		
Albion Park-Oak Flats Eagles	–	Kiama Knights	Sunday, 29 May, 15:00	Centenary Field		
Nowra-Bomaderry Jets	–	Stingrays of Shellharbour	Sunday, 29 May, 15:00	Bomaderry Sports Complex		
Warilla-Lake South Gorillas	–	Gerringong Lions	Sunday, 29 May, 15:00	Cec Glenholmes Oval		

==== Round 8 ====
Home	Score	Away	Match information			
Home	Score	Away	Date and time	Venue	Referee	Video replay
Berry-Shoalhaven Heads Magpies	–	Jambaroo Superoos	Saturday, 4 June, 15:00	Berry Showground		
Gerringong Lions	–	Albion Park-Oak Flats Eagles	Saturday, 4 June, 15:00	Michael Cronin Oval		
Kiama Knights	–	Shellharbour Sharks	Sunday, 5 June, 15:00	Kiama Showground		
Nowra-Bomaderry Jets	–	Warilla-Lake South Gorillas	Sunday, 5 June, 15:00	Bomaderry Sports Complex		
Stingrays of Shellharbour	–	Milton-Ulladulla Bulldogs	Sunday, 5 June, 15:30	Flinders Field		

==== Round 9 ====
Home	Score	Away	Match information			
Home	Score	Away	Date and time	Venue	Referee	Video replay
Berry-Shoalhaven Heads Magpies	–	Gerringong Lions	Saturday, 18 June, 15:00	Berry Showground		
Kiama Knights	–	Jambaroo Superoos	Saturday, 18 June, 15:00	Kiama Showground		
Albion Park-Oak Flats Eagles	–	Stingrays of Shellharbour	Sunday, 19 June, 15:00	Centenary Field		
Nowra-Bomaderry Jets	–	Milton-Ulladulla Bulldogs	Sunday, 19 June, 15:00	Bomaderry Sports Complex		
Shellharbour Sharks	–	Warilla-Lake South Gorillas	Sunday, 19 June, 15:00	Ron Costello Oval		

==== Round 10 ====
Home	Score	Away	Match information			
Home	Score	Away	Date and time	Venue	Referee	Video replay
Berry-Shoalhaven Heads Magpies	–	Milton-Ulladulla Bulldogs	Saturday, 25 June, 15:00	Bill Andriske Oval		
Gerringong Lions	–	Stingrays of Shellharbour	Saturday, 25 June, 15:00	Michael Cronin Oval		
Jambaroo Superoos	–	Shellharbour Sharks	Saturday, 25 June, 15:00	Kevin Walsh Oval		
Albion Park-Oak Flats Eagles	–	Nowra-Bomaderry Jets	Sunday, 26 June, 15:00	Centenary Field		
Kiama Knights	–	Warilla-Lake South Gorillas	Sunday, 26 June, 15:00	Kiama Showground		

==== Round 11 ====
Home	Score	Away	Match information			
Home	Score	Away	Date and time	Venue	Referee	Video replay
Jambaroo Superoos	–	Gerringong Lions	Saturday, 2 July, 15:00	Kevin Walsh Oval		
Nowra-Bomaderry Jets	–	Kiama Knights	Sunday, 3 July, 15:00	Bomaderry Sports Complex		
Shellharbour Sharks	–	Albion Park-Oak Flats Eagles	Sunday, 3 July, 15:00	Ron Costello Oval		
Warilla-Lake South Gorillas	–	Milton-Ulladulla Bulldogs	Sunday, 3 July, 15:00	Cec Glenholmes Oval		
Stingrays of Shellharbour	–	Berry-Shoalhaven Heads Magpies	Sunday, 3 July, 15:30	Flinders Field		

==== Round 12 ====
Home	Score	Away	Match information			
Home	Score	Away	Date and time	Venue	Referee	Video replay
Gerringong Lions	–	Milton-Ulladulla Bulldogs	Saturday, 9 July, 15:00	Michael Cronin Oval		
Nowra-Bomaderry Jets	–	Shellharbour Sharks	Saturday, 9 July, 15:00	Bomaderry Sports Complex		
Stingrays of Shellharbour	–	Jambaroo Superoos	Saturday, 9 July, 15:00	Flinders Field		
Albion Park-Oak Flats Eagles	–	Warilla-Lake South Gorillas	Sunday, 10 July, 15:00	Centenary Field		
Kiama Knights	–	Berry-Shoalhaven Heads Magpies	Sunday, 10 July, 15:00	Kiama Showground		

==== Round 13 ====
Home	Score	Away	Match information			
Home	Score	Away	Date and time	Venue	Referee	Video replay
Albion Park-Oak Flats Eagles	–	Jambaroo Superoos	Saturday, 16 July, 15:00	Centenary Field		
Berry-Shoalhaven Heads Magpies	–	Nowra-Bomaderry Jets	Saturday, 16 July, 15:00	Berry Showground		
Kiama Knights	–	Milton-Ulladulla Bulldogs	Sunday, 17 July, 15:00	Kiama Showground		
Shellharbour Sharks	–	Gerringong Lions	Sunday, 17 July, 15:00	Ron Costello Oval		
Warilla-Lake South Gorillas	–	Stingrays of Shellharbour	Sunday, 17 July, 15:00	Cec Glenholmes Oval		

==== Round 14 ====
Home	Score	Away	Match information			
Home	Score	Away	Date and time	Venue	Referee	Video replay
Berry-Shoalhaven Heads Magpies	–	Albion Park-Oak Flats Eagles	Saturday, 23 July, 15:00	Berry Showground		
Jambaroo Superoos	–	Warilla-Lake South Gorillas	Saturday, 23 July, 15:00	Kevin Walsh Oval		
Kiama Knights	–	Stingrays of Shellharbour	Sunday, 24 July, 15:00	Kiama Showground		
Nowra-Bomaderry Jets	–	Gerringong Lions	Sunday, 24 July, 15:00	Bomaderry Sports Complex		
Shellharbour Sharks	–	Milton-Ulladulla Bulldogs	Sunday, 24 July, 15:00	Ron Costello Oval		

==== Round 15 ====
Home	Score	Away	Match information			
Home	Score	Away	Date and time	Venue	Referee	Video replay
Gerringong Lions	–	Kiama Knights	Saturday, 6 August, 14:00	Michael Cronin Oval		
Berry-Shoalhaven Heads Magpies	–	Warilla-Lake South Gorillas	Saturday, 6 August, 15:00	Berry Showground		
Jambaroo Superoos	–	Nowra-Bomaderry Jets	Saturday, 6 August, 15:00	Kevin Walsh Oval		
Milton-Ulladulla Bulldogs	–	Albion Park-Oak Flats Eagles	Sunday, 7 August, 15:00	Bill Andriske Oval		
Stingrays of Shellharbour	–	Shellharbour Sharks	Sunday, 7 August, 15:00	Flinders Field		

==== Round 16 ====
Home	Score	Away	Match information			
Home	Score	Away	Date and time	Venue	Referee	Video replay
Berry-Shoalhaven Heads Magpies	–	Shellharbour Sharks	Saturday, 13 August, 15:00	Berry Showground		
Gerringong Lions	–	Warilla-Lake South Gorillas	Saturday, 13 August, 15:00	Michael Cronin Oval		
Milton-Ulladulla Bulldogs	–	Jambaroo Superoos	Saturday, 13 August, 15:00	Bill Andriske Oval		
Kiama Knights	–	Albion Park-Oak Flats Eagles	Sunday, 14 August, 15:00	Kiama Showground		
Stingrays of Shellharbour	–	Nowra-Bomaderry Jets	Sunday, 14 August, 15:30	Flinders Field		

==== Round 17 ====
Home	Score	Away	Match information			
Home	Score	Away	Date and time	Venue	Referee	Video replay
Jambaroo Superoos	–	Berry-Shoalhaven Heads Magpies	Saturday, 20 August, 15:00	Kevin Walsh Oval		
Milton-Ulladulla Bulldogs	–	Stingrays of Shellharbour	Saturday, 20 August, 15:00	Bill Andriske Oval		
Albion Park-Oak Flats Eagles	–	Gerringong Lions	Sunday, 21 August, 15:00	Centenary Field		
Shellharbour Sharks	–	Kiama Knights	Sunday, 21 August, 15:00	Ron Costello Oval		
Warilla-Lake South Gorillas	–	Nowra-Bomaderry Jets	Sunday, 21 August, 15:00	Cec Glenholmes Oval		

==== Round 18 ====
Home	Score	Away	Match information			
Home	Score	Away	Date and time	Venue	Referee	Video replay
Berry-Shoalhaven Heads Magpies	–	Gerringong Lions	Saturday, 2 April, 15:00	Berry Showground		
Jambaroo Superoos	–	Kiama Knights	Saturday, 2 April, 15:00	Kevin Walsh Oval		
Stingrays of Shellharbour	–	Albion Park-Oak Flats Eagles	Sunday, 3 April, 15:00	Flinders Field		
Milton-Ulladulla Bulldogs	–	Nowra-Bomaderry Jets	Sunday, 3 April, 15:00	Bill Andriske Oval		
Warilla-Lake South Gorillas	–	Shellharbour Sharks	Sunday, 3 April, 15:00	Cec Glenholmes Oval		

== Reserve grade (2nd grade) ==
2022 Group 7 Rugby League Reserve Grade
- Duration: 9 April – 25 September
- Teams: 10
- Broadcast partners: Bar TV Sports

=== Teams ===
Colours	Club	Home ground(s)	2021 position
	Albion Park-Oak Flats Eagles	Centenary Field	5th
	Berry-Shoalhaven Heads Magpies	Berry Showground	3rd
	Gerringong Lions	Michael Cronin Oval	1st
	Jamberoo Superoos	Kevin Walsh Oval	8th
	Kiama Knights	Kiama Showground	9th
	Milton-Ulladulla Bulldogs	Bill Andriske Oval	10th
	Nowra-Bomaderry Jets	Bomaderry Sports Complex	7th
	Shellharbour Sharks	Ron Costello Oval	6th
	Stingrays of Shellharbour	Flinders Field	2nd
	Warilla-Lake South Gorillas	Cec Glenholmes Oval	4th

=== Ladder ===
Pos	Team	Pld	W	D	L	B	PF	PA	PD	Pts
1	Gerringong Lions	2	2	0	0	0	68	12	+56	4
2	Kiama Knights	2	2	0	0	0	54	24	+30	4
3	Albion Park-Oak Flats Eagles	2	2	0	0	0	58	34	+24	4
4	Shellharbour Sharks	2	1	0	1	0	58	28	+30	2
5	Jambaroo Superoos	2	1	0	1	0	36	24	+12	2
6	Stingrays of Shellharbour	2	1	0	1	0	44	48	-4	2
7	Warilla-Lake South Gorillas	2	1	0	1	0	24	44	-20	2
8	Berry-Shoalhaven Heads Magpies	2	0	0	2	0	36	68	-32	0
9	Nowra-Bomaderry Jets	2	0	0	2	0	16	56	-40	0
10	Milton-Ulladulla Bulldogs	2	0	0	2	0	10	64	-54	0

=== Regular season ===
==== Round 1 ====
Home	Score	Away	Match information			
Home	Score	Away	Date and time	Venue	Referee	Video replay
Stingrays of Shellharbour	P – P	Gerringong Lions	TBC	Flinders Field		
Nowra-Bomaderry Jets	P – P	Albion Park-Oak Flats Eagles	TBC	Bomaderry Sports Complex		
Milton-Ulladulla Bulldogs	P – P	Berry-Shoalhaven Heads Magpies	TBC	Bill Andriske Oval		
Shellharbour Sharks	P – P	Jambaroo Superoos	TBC	Ron Costello Oval		
Warilla-Lake South Gorillas	P – P	Kiama Knights	TBC	Cec Glenholmes Oval		

- Round 1 was washed out and postponed to the washout catch up round on the weekend of 30/31 July.

==== Round 2 ====
Home	Score	Away	Match information			
Home	Score	Away	Date and time	Venue	Referee	Video replay
Albion Park-Oak Flats Eagles	24 – 22	Shellharbour Sharks	Saturday, 23 April, 13:30	Centenary Field	M. Goroch	
Berry-Shoalhaven Heads Magpies	24 – 34	Stingrays of Shellharbour	Saturday, 23 April, 13:30	Bomaderry Sports Complex	W. Cooke	
Gerringong Lions	14 – 12	Jambaroo Superoos	Saturday, 23 April, 13:30	Michael Cronin Oval	M. Booth	
Kiama Knights	20 – 12	Nowra-Bomaderry Jets	Sunday, 24 April, 13:30	Kiama Showground	N. McInerney	
Milton-Ulladulla Bulldogs	10 – 12	Warilla-Lake South Gorillas	Sunday, 24 April, 13:30	Bill Andriske Oval	J. Borg	

==== Round 3 ====
Home	Score	Away	Match information			
Home	Score	Away	Date and time	Venue	Referee	Video replay
Jambaroo Superoos	24 – 10	Stingrays of Shellharbour	Saturday, 30 April, 13:30	Kevin Walsh Oval	J. Borg	
Shellharbour Sharks	36 – 4	Nowra-Bomaderry Jets	Saturday, 30 April, 13:30	Ron Costello Oval	M. Booth	
Berry-Shoalhaven Heads Magpies	12 – 34	Kiama Knights	Sunday, 1 May, 13:30	Kiama Showground	W. Cooke	
Milton-Ulladulla Bulldogs	0 – 54	Gerringong Lions	Sunday, 1 May, 13:30	Bill Andriske Oval	N. Willer	
Warilla-Lake South Gorillas	12 – 34	Albion Park-Oak Flats Eagles	Sunday, 1 May, 13:30	Cec Glenholmes Oval	N. McInerney	

==== Round 4 ====
Home	Score	Away	Match information			
Home	Score	Away	Date and time	Venue	Referee	Video replay
Gerringong Lions	–	Shellharbour Sharks	Saturday, 7 May, 13:30	Michael Cronin Oval	J. Borg	
Jambaroo Superoos	–	Albion Park-Oak Flats Eagles	Saturday, 7 May, 13:30	Kevin Walsh Oval	N. McInerney	
Milton-Ulladulla Bulldogs	–	Kiama Knights	Saturday, 7 May, 13:30	Bill Andriske Oval	W. Cooke	
Nowra-Bomaderry Jets	–	Berry-Shoalhaven Heads Magpies	Sunday, 8 May, 13:30	Bomaderry Sports Complex	N. Willer	
Stingrays of Shellharbour	–	Warilla-Lake South Gorillas	Sunday, 8 May, 13:30	Flinders Field	M. Booth	

==== Round 5 ====
Home	Score	Away	Match information			
Home	Score	Away	Date and time	Venue	Referee	Video replay
Gerringong Lions	P – P	Nowra-Bomaderry Jets	TBC	Michael Cronin Oval		
Milton-Ulladulla Bulldogs	P – P	Shellharbour Sharks	TBC	Bill Andriske Oval		
Albion Park-Oak Flats Eagles	P – P	Berry-Shoalhaven Heads Magpies	TBC	Centenary Field		
Stingrays of Shellharbour	P – P	Kiama Knights	TBC	Flinders Field		
Warilla-Lake South Gorillas	P – P	Jambaroo Superoos	TBC	Cec Glenholmes Oval		

==== Round 6 ====
Home	Score	Away	Match information			
Home	Score	Away	Date and time	Venue	Referee	Video replay
Albion Park-Oak Flats Eagles	–	Milton-Ulladulla Bulldogs	Saturday, 21 May, 13:30	Centenary Field	M. Goroch	
Shellharbour Sharks	–	Stingrays of Shellharbour	Saturday, 21 May, 13:30	Ron Costello Oval	W. Cooke	
Kiama Knights	–	Gerringong Lions	Saturday, 21 May, 13:30	Kiama Showground	N. McInerney	
Nowra-Bomaderry Jets	–	Jambaroo Superoos	Sunday, 22 May, 13:30	Bomaderry Sports Complex	R. Micallef	
Warilla-Lake South Gorillas	–	Berry-Shoalhaven Heads Magpies	Sunday, 22 May, 13:30	Cec Glenholmes Oval	D. Chamberlain	

==== Round 7 ====
Home	Score	Away	Match information			
Home	Score	Away	Date and time	Venue	Referee	Video replay
Jambaroo Superoos	–	Milton-Ulladulla Bulldogs	Saturday, 28 May, 13:30	Kevin Walsh Oval		
Shellharbour Sharks	–	Berry-Shoalhaven Heads Magpies	Saturday, 28 May, 13:30	Ron Costello Oval		
Albion Park-Oak Flats Eagles	–	Kiama Knights	Sunday, 29 May, 13:30	Centenary Field		
Nowra-Bomaderry Jets	–	Stingrays of Shellharbour	Sunday, 29 May, 13:30	Bomaderry Sports Complex		
Warilla-Lake South Gorillas	–	Gerringong Lions	Sunday, 29 May, 13:30	Cec Glenholmes Oval		

==== Round 8 ====
Home	Score	Away	Match information			
Home	Score	Away	Date and time	Venue	Referee	Video replay
Berry-Shoalhaven Heads Magpies	–	Jambaroo Superoos	Saturday, 4 June, 13:30	Berry Showground		
Gerringong Lions	–	Albion Park-Oak Flats Eagles	Saturday, 4 June, 13:30	Michael Cronin Oval		
Kiama Knights	–	Shellharbour Sharks	Sunday, 5 June, 13:30	Kiama Showground		
Nowra-Bomaderry Jets	–	Warilla-Lake South Gorillas	Sunday, 5 June, 13:30	Bomaderry Sports Complex		
Stingrays of Shellharbour	–	Milton-Ulladulla Bulldogs	Sunday, 5 June, 13:30	Flinders Field		

==== Round 9 ====
Home	Score	Away	Match information			
Home	Score	Away	Date and time	Venue	Referee	Video replay
Berry-Shoalhaven Heads Magpies	–	Gerringong Lions	Saturday, 18 June, 13:30	Berry Showground		
Kiama Knights	–	Jambaroo Superoos	Saturday, 18 June, 13:30	Kiama Showground		
Albion Park-Oak Flats Eagles	–	Stingrays of Shellharbour	Sunday, 19 June, 13:30	Centenary Field		
Nowra-Bomaderry Jets	–	Milton-Ulladulla Bulldogs	Sunday, 19 June, 13:30	Bomaderry Sports Complex		
Shellharbour Sharks	–	Warilla-Lake South Gorillas	Sunday, 19 June, 13:30	Ron Costello Oval		

==== Round 10 ====
Home	Score	Away	Match information			
Home	Score	Away	Date and time	Venue	Referee	Video replay
Berry-Shoalhaven Heads Magpies	–	Milton-Ulladulla Bulldogs	Saturday, 25 June, 13:30	Bill Andriske Oval		
Gerringong Lions	–	Stingrays of Shellharbour	Saturday, 25 June, 13:30	Michael Cronin Oval		
Jambaroo Superoos	–	Shellharbour Sharks	Saturday, 25 June, 13:30	Kevin Walsh Oval		
Albion Park-Oak Flats Eagles	–	Nowra-Bomaderry Jets	Sunday, 26 June, 13:30	Centenary Field		
Kiama Knights	–	Warilla-Lake South Gorillas	Sunday, 26 June, 13:30	Kiama Showground		

==== Round 11 ====
Home	Score	Away	Match information			
Home	Score	Away	Date and time	Venue	Referee	Video replay
Jambaroo Superoos	–	Gerringong Lions	Saturday, 2 July, 13:30	Kevin Walsh Oval		
Nowra-Bomaderry Jets	–	Kiama Knights	Sunday, 3 July, 13:30	Bomaderry Sports Complex		
Shellharbour Sharks	–	Albion Park-Oak Flats Eagles	Sunday, 3 July, 13:30	Ron Costello Oval		
Warilla-Lake South Gorillas	–	Milton-Ulladulla Bulldogs	Sunday, 3 July, 13:30	Cec Glenholmes Oval		
Stingrays of Shellharbour	–	Berry-Shoalhaven Heads Magpies	Sunday, 3 July, 13:30	Flinders Field		

==== Round 12 ====
Home	Score	Away	Match information			
Home	Score	Away	Date and time	Venue	Referee	Video replay
Gerringong Lions	–	Milton-Ulladulla Bulldogs	Saturday, 9 July, 13:30	Michael Cronin Oval		
Nowra-Bomaderry Jets	–	Shellharbour Sharks	Saturday, 9 July, 13:30	Bomaderry Sports Complex		
Stingrays of Shellharbour	–	Jambaroo Superoos	Saturday, 9 July, 13:30	Flinders Field		
Albion Park-Oak Flats Eagles	–	Warilla-Lake South Gorillas	Sunday, 10 July, 13:30	Centenary Field		
Kiama Knights	–	Berry-Shoalhaven Heads Magpies	Sunday, 10 July, 13:30	Kiama Showground		

==== Round 13 ====
Home	Score	Away	Match information			
Home	Score	Away	Date and time	Venue	Referee	Video replay
Albion Park-Oak Flats Eagles	–	Jambaroo Superoos	Saturday, 16 July, 13:30	Centenary Field		
Berry-Shoalhaven Heads Magpies	–	Nowra-Bomaderry Jets	Saturday, 16 July, 13:30	Berry Showground		
Kiama Knights	–	Milton-Ulladulla Bulldogs	Sunday, 17 July, 13:30	Kiama Showground		
Shellharbour Sharks	–	Gerringong Lions	Sunday, 17 July, 13:30	Ron Costello Oval		
Warilla-Lake South Gorillas	–	Stingrays of Shellharbour	Sunday, 17 July, 13:30	Cec Glenholmes Oval		

==== Round 14 ====
Home	Score	Away	Match information			
Home	Score	Away	Date and time	Venue	Referee	Video replay
Berry-Shoalhaven Heads Magpies	–	Albion Park-Oak Flats Eagles	Saturday, 23 July, 13:30	Berry Showground		
Jambaroo Superoos	–	Warilla-Lake South Gorillas	Saturday, 23 July, 13:30	Kevin Walsh Oval		
Kiama Knights	–	Stingrays of Shellharbour	Sunday, 24 July, 13:30	Kiama Showground		
Nowra-Bomaderry Jets	–	Gerringong Lions	Sunday, 24 July, 13:30	Bomaderry Sports Complex		
Shellharbour Sharks	–	Milton-Ulladulla Bulldogs	Sunday, 24 July, 13:30	Ron Costello Oval		

==== Round 15 ====
Home	Score	Away	Match information			
Home	Score	Away	Date and time	Venue	Referee	Video replay
Gerringong Lions	–	Kiama Knights	Saturday, 6 August, 12:30	Michael Cronin Oval		
Berry-Shoalhaven Heads Magpies	–	Warilla-Lake South Gorillas	Saturday, 6 August, 13:30	Berry Showground		
Jambaroo Superoos	–	Nowra-Bomaderry Jets	Saturday, 6 August, 13:30	Kevin Walsh Oval		
Milton-Ulladulla Bulldogs	–	Albion Park-Oak Flats Eagles	Sunday, 7 August, 13:30	Bill Andriske Oval		
Stingrays of Shellharbour	–	Shellharbour Sharks	Sunday, 7 August, 13:30	Flinders Field		

==== Round 16 ====
Home	Score	Away	Match information			
Home	Score	Away	Date and time	Venue	Referee	Video replay
Berry-Shoalhaven Heads Magpies	–	Shellharbour Sharks	Saturday, 13 August, 13:30	Berry Showground		
Gerringong Lions	–	Warilla-Lake South Gorillas	Saturday, 13 August, 13:30	Michael Cronin Oval		
Milton-Ulladulla Bulldogs	–	Jambaroo Superoos	Saturday, 13 August, 13:30	Bill Andriske Oval		
Kiama Knights	–	Albion Park-Oak Flats Eagles	Sunday, 14 August, 13:30	Kiama Showground		
Stingrays of Shellharbour	–	Nowra-Bomaderry Jets	Sunday, 14 August, 13:30	Flinders Field		

==== Round 17 ====
Home	Score	Away	Match information			
Home	Score	Away	Date and time	Venue	Referee	Video replay
Jambaroo Superoos	–	Berry-Shoalhaven Heads Magpies	Saturday, 20 August, 13:30	Kevin Walsh Oval		
Milton-Ulladulla Bulldogs	–	Stingrays of Shellharbour	Saturday, 20 August, 13:30	Bill Andriske Oval		
Albion Park-Oak Flats Eagles	–	Gerringong Lions	Sunday, 21 August, 13:30	Centenary Field		
Shellharbour Sharks	–	Kiama Knights	Sunday, 21 August, 13:30	Ron Costello Oval		
Warilla-Lake South Gorillas	–	Nowra-Bomaderry Jets	Sunday, 21 August, 13:30	Cec Glenholmes Oval		

==== Round 18 ====
Home	Score	Away	Match information			
Home	Score	Away	Date and time	Venue	Referee	Video replay
Berry-Shoalhaven Heads Magpies	–	Gerringong Lions	Saturday, 2 April, 13:30	Berry Showground		
Jambaroo Superoos	–	Kiama Knights	Saturday, 2 April, 13:30	Kevin Walsh Oval		
Stingrays of Shellharbour	–	Albion Park-Oak Flats Eagles	Sunday, 3 April, 13:30	Flinders Field		
Milton-Ulladulla Bulldogs	–	Nowra-Bomaderry Jets	Sunday, 3 April, 13:30	Bill Andriske Oval		
Warilla-Lake South Gorillas	–	Shellharbour Sharks	Sunday, 3 April, 13:30	Cec Glenholmes Oval		

== Regan Cup (3rd grade) ==
2022 Group 7 Rugby League Regan Cup
- Duration: 9 April – 18 September
- Teams: 7
- Broadcast partners: Bar TV Sports

=== Teams ===
Colours	Club	Home ground(s)	2021 position
	Albion Park Outlaws	Des King Oval	9th
	Culburra Dolphins	Crookhaven Park	6th
	Jamberoo Superoos	Kevin Walsh Oval	11th
	Robertson-Burrawong Spuddies	Robertson Showground	3rd
	Stingrays of Shellharbour	Flinders Field	5th
	Southern Highlands Storm	Community Field Loseby Park	8th
	Sussex Inlet Panthers	Finkernagle Oval	1st

=== Ladder ===
Pos	Team	Pld	W	D	L	B	PF	PA	PD	Pts
1	Stingrays of Shellharbour	1	1	0	0	0	32	8	+24	2
2	Robertson-Burrawong Spuddies	1	1	0	0	0	22	18	+4	2
3	Albion Park Outlaws	1	0	0	0	1	0	0	0	2
4	Culburra Dolphins	1	0	0	0	1	0	0	0	2
5	Southern Highlands Storm	1	0	0	0	1	0	0	0	2
6	Sussex Inlet Panthers	1	0	0	1	0	18	22	-4	0
7	Jamberoo Superoos	1	0	0	1	0	8	32	-24	0

=== Regular season ===
==== Round 1 ====
Home	Score	Away	Match information			
Home	Score	Away	Date and time	Venue	Referee	Video replay
Stingrays of Shellharbour	P – P	Albion Park Outlaws	TBC	Flinders Field		
Sussex Inlet Panthers	P – P	Culburra Dolphins	TBC	Fingernagle Oval		
Bye(s): Jamberoo Superoos, Robertson-Burrawong Spuddies, Southern Highlands Storm

- Round 1 was washed out and postponed to the washout round on the weekend of 30/31 July.

==== Round 2 ====
Home	Score	Away	Match information			
Home	Score	Away	Date and time	Venue	Referee	Video replay
Southern Highlands Storm	P – P	Albion Park Outlaws	Saturday 9 July, 14:00	Community Oval		
Culburra Dolphins	P – P	Jamberoo Superoos	Sunday, 10 July, 14:00	Crookhaven Park		
Bye(s): Robertson-Burrawong Spuddies, Stingrays of Shellharbour, Sussex Inlet Panthers

- Round 2 was postponed due to unplayable playing conditions to the host grounds, and was therefore postponed to the 3rd grade washout round on the weekend of 9/10 July.

==== Round 3 ====
Home	Score	Away	Match information			
Home	Score	Away	Date and time	Venue	Referee	Video replay
Robertson-Burrawong Spuddies	22 – 18	Sussex Inlet Panthers	Saturday, 30 April, 14:00	Finkernagle Oval	B. Warren	N/A
Jamberoo Superoos	8 – 32	Stingrays of Shellharbour	Sunday, 1 May, 13:30	Loseby Park	M. Goroch	N/A
Bye(s): Albion Park Outlaws, Culburra Dolphins, Southern Highlands Storm

==== Round 4 ====
Home	Score	Away	Match information			
Home	Score	Away	Date and time	Venue	Referee	Video replay
Jamberoo Superoos	0 – 38	Culburra Dolphins	Saturday, 7 May, 12:00	Kevin Walsh Oval	B. Chamberlain	
Stingrays of Shellharbour	24 – 22	Robertson-Burrawong Spuddies	Sunday, 8 May, 10:30	Flinders Field	M. Goroch	N/A
Southern Highlands Storm	28 – 10	Albion Park Outlaws	Sunday, 8 May, 15:00	Loseby Park	G. Nolan	N/A
Bye(s): Sussex Inlet Panthers

==== Round 5 ====
Home	Score	Away	Match information			
Home	Score	Away	Date and time	Venue	Referee	Video replay
Albion Park Outlaws	P – P	Jamberoo Superoos	TBC	Des King Oval		
Robertson-Burrawong Spuddies	P – P	Sussex Inlet Panthers	TBC	Robertson Showground		
Stingrays of Shellharbour	P – P	Southern Highlands Storm	TBC	Flinders Field		
Bye(s): Culburra Dolphins

==== Round 6 ====
Home	Score	Away	Match information			
Home	Score	Away	Date and time	Venue	Referee	Video replay
Culburra Dolphins	–	Southern Highlands Storm	Saturday, 21 May, 14:00	Gordon Ravell Oval	G. Gaffney	N/A
Robertson-Burrawong Spuddies	–	Albion Park Outlaws	Saturday, 21 May, 14:00	Robertson Showground	G. Phieffer	N/A
Sussex Inlet Panthers	–	Jamberoo Superoos	Saturday, 21 May, 14:00	Finkernagle Oval	E. Drury	N/A
Bye(s): Stingrays of Shellharbour

==== Round 7 ====
Home	Score	Away	Match information			
Home	Score	Away	Date and time	Venue	Referee	Video replay
Jamberoo Superoos	–	Robertson-Burrawong Spuddies	Saturday, 28 May, 12:00	Kevin Walsh Oval		
Albion Park Outlaws	–	Culburra Dolphins	Saturday, 28 May, 14:00	Des King Oval		
Sussex Inlet Panthers	–	Stingrays of Shellharbour	Saturday, 28 May, 14:00	Finkernagle Oval		
Bye(s): Southern Highlands Storm

==== Round 8 ====
Home	Score	Away	Match information			
Home	Score	Away	Date and time	Venue	Referee	Video replay
Culburra Dolphins	–	Robertson-Burrawong Spuddies	Saturday, 4 June, 14:00	Crookhaven Park		
Sussex Inlet Panthers	–	Southern Highlands Storm	Saturday, 4 June, 14:00	Finkernagle Oval		
Stingrays of Shellharbour	–	Jamberoo Superoos	Sunday, 5 June, 11:00	Flinders Field		
Bye(s): Albion Park Outlaws

==== Round 9 ====
Home	Score	Away	Match information			
Home	Score	Away	Date and time	Venue	Referee	Video replay
Culburra Dolphins	–	Stingrays of Shellharbour	Saturday, 18 June, 14:00	Crookhaven Park		
Sussex Inlet Panthers	–	Albion Park Outlaws	Saturday, 18 June, 14:00	Finkernagle Oval		
Southern Highlands Storm	–	Jamberoo Superoos	Sunday, 19 June, 15:00	Community Field		
Bye(s): Robertson-Burrawong Spuddies

==== Round 10 ====
Home	Score	Away	Match information			
Home	Score	Away	Date and time	Venue	Referee	Video replay
Albion Park Outlaws	–	Stingrays of Shellharbour	Friday, 24 June, 18:30	Des King Oval		
Culburra Dolphins	–	Sussex Inlet Panthers	Saturday, 25 June, 14:00	Crookhaven Park		
Southern Highlands Storm	–	Robertson-Burrawong Spuddies	Sunday, 26 June, 15:00	Community Field		
Bye(s): Jamberoo Superoos

==== Round 11 ====
Home	Score	Away	Match information			
Home	Score	Away	Date and time	Venue	Referee	Video replay
Jamberoo Superoos	–	Albion Park Outlaws	Saturday, 2 July, 12:00	Kevin Walsh Oval		
Stingrays of Shellharbour	–	Culburra Dolphins	Sunday, 3 July, 11:00	Flinders Field		
Southern Highlands Storm	–	Robertson-Burrawong Spuddies	Sunday, 3 July, 15:00	Community Oval		
Bye(s): Sussex Inlet Panthers

==== Round 12 ====
Home	Score	Away	Match information			
Home	Score	Away	Date and time	Venue	Referee	Video replay
Albion Park Outlaws	–	Southern Highlands Storm	Saturday, 16 July, 14:00	Des King Oval		
Culburra Dolphins	–	Sussex Inlet Panthers	Saturday, 16 July, 14:00	Crookhaven Park		
Robertson-Burrawong Spuddies	–	Stingrays of Shellharbour	Saturday, 16 July, 14:00	Robertson Showground		
Bye(s): Jamberoo Superoos

==== Round 13 ====
Home	Score	Away	Match information			
Home	Score	Away	Date and time	Venue	Referee	Video replay
Jamberoo Superoos	–	Albion Park Outlaws	Saturday, 23 July, 12:00	Kevin Walsh Oval		
Sussex Inlet Panthers	–	Robertson-Burrawong Spuddies	Saturday, 23 July, 14:00	Finkernagle Oval		
Southern Highlands Storm	–	Stingrays of Shellharbour	Sunday, 24 July, 15:00	Community Field		
Bye(s): Culburra Dolphins

==== Round 14 ====
Home	Score	Away	Match information			
Home	Score	Away	Date and time	Venue	Referee	Video replay
Jamberoo Superoos	–	Sussex Inlet Panthers	Saturday, 6 August, 11:00	Kevin Walsh Oval		
Albion Park Outlaws	–	Robertson-Burrawong Spuddies	Saturday, 6 August, 14:00	Des King Oval		
Southern Highlands Storm	–	Culburra Dolphins	Sunday, 7 August, 15:00	Community Field		
Bye(s): Stingrays of Shellharbour

==== Round 15 ====
Home	Score	Away	Match information			
Home	Score	Away	Date and time	Venue	Referee	Video replay
Culburra Dolphins	–	Albion Park Outlaws	Saturday, 13 August, 14:00	Crookhaven Park		
Stingrays of Shellharbour	–	Sussex Inlet Panthers	Sunday, 14 August, 10:00	Flinders Field		
Robertson-Burrawong Spuddies	–	Jamberoo Superoos	Sunday, 14 August, 14:00	Robertson Showground		
Bye(s): Southern Highlands Storm

==== Round 16 ====
Home	Score	Away	Match information			
Home	Score	Away	Date and time	Venue	Referee	Video replay
Jamberoo Superoos	–	Stingrays of Shellharbour	Saturday, 20 August, 12:00	Kevin Walsh Oval		
Robertson-Burrawong Spuddies	–	Culburra Dolphins	Saturday, 20 August, 14:00	Robertson Showground		
Southern Highlands Storm	–	Sussex Inlet Panthers	Sunday, 21 August, 15:00	Community Field		
Bye(s): Albion Park Outlaws

==== Round 17 ====
Home	Score	Away	Match information			
Home	Score	Away	Date and time	Venue	Referee	Video replay
Jamberoo Superoos	–	Southern Highlands Storm	Saturday, 27 August, 11:00	Kevin Walsh Oval		
Albion Park Outlaws	–	Sussex Inlet Panthers	Saturday, 27 August, 14:00	Des King Oval		
Stingrays of Shellharbour	–	Culburra Dolphins	Sunday, 28 August, 10:30	Flinders Field		
Bye(s): Robertson-Burrawong Spuddies

== Under-18's ==
2022 Group 7 Rugby League Under-18's
- Duration: 9 April – 25 September
- Teams: 10
- Broadcast partners: Bar TV Sports

=== Teams ===
Colours	Club	Home ground(s)	2021 position
	Albion Park-Oak Flats Eagles	Centenary Field	N/A
	Berry-Shoalhaven Heads Magpies	Berry Showground	N/A
	Gerringong Lions Red	Michael Cronin Oval	1st
	Gerringong Lions Blue	Michael Cronin Oval	1st
	Milton-Ulladulla Bulldogs	Bill Andriske Oval	6th
	Nowra-Bomaderry Jets	Bomaderry Sports Complex	2nd
	Shellharbour Sharks	Ron Costello Oval	4th
	Stingrays of Shellharbour	Flinders Field	3rd
	Southern Highlands Storm	Community Field Loseby Park	N/A
	Warilla-Lake South Gorillas	Cec Glenholmes Oval	5th

=== Ladder ===
Pos	Team	Pld	W	D	L	B	PF	PA	PD	Pts
1	Gerringong Lions Blue	2	2	0	0	0	132	4	+128	4
2	Gerringong Lions Red	2	2	0	0	0	112	4	+108	4
3	Stingrays of Shellharbour	2	2	0	0	0	78	18	+60	4
4	Albion Park-Oak Flats Eagles	2	2	0	0	0	72	26	+46	4
5	Milton-Ulladulla Bulldogs	2	1	0	1	0	60	66	-6	2
6	Shellharbour Sharks	2	1	0	1	0	36	42	-6	2
7	Nowra-Bomaderry Jets	2	0	0	2	0	22	70	-48	0
8	Warilla-Lake South Gorillas	2	0	0	2	0	26	104	-78	0
9	Berry-Shoalhaven Heads Magpies	2	0	0	2	0	6	102	-96	0
10	Southern Highlands Storm	2	0	0	2	0	12	120	-108	0

=== Regular season ===
==== Round 1 ====
Home	Score	Away	Match information			
Home	Score	Away	Date and time	Venue	Referee	Video replay
Nowra-Bomaderry Jets	P – P	Albion Park-Oak Flats Eagles	TBC	Bomaderry Sporting Complex		
Milton-Ulladulla Bulldogs	P – P	Berry-Shoalhaven Heads Magpies	TBC	Bill Andriske Oval		
Shellharbour Sharks	P – P	Southern Highlands Storm	TBC	Ron Costello Oval		
Stingrays of Shellharbour	P – P	Gerringong Lions Blue	TBC	Flinders Field		
Warilla-Lake South Gorillas	P – P	Gerringong Lions Red	TBC	Cec Glenholmes Oval		

- Round 1 was washed out and postponed to the washout catch up round on the weekend of 30/31 July.

==== Round 2 ====
Home	Score	Away	Match information			
Home	Score	Away	Date and time	Venue	Referee	Video replay
Gerringong Lions Red	50 – 4	Nowra-Bomaderry Jets	Saturday, 23 April, 10:30	Michael Cronin Oval	T. Power	N/A
Albion Park-Oak Flats Eagles	24 – 16	Shellharbour Sharks	Saturday, 23 April, 12:00	Centenary Field	B. Simon	N/A
Berry-Shoalhaven Heads Magpies	6 – 40	Stingrays of Shellharbour	Saturday, 23 April, 12:00	Bomaderry Sports Complex	K. Mounfield	N/A
Gerringong Lions Blue	82 – 0	Southern Highlands Storm	Saturday, 23 April, 12:00	Michael Cronin Oval	A. Ellem	N/A
Milton-Ulladulla Bulldogs	56 – 16	Warilla-Lake South Gorillas	Sunday, 24 April, 12:00	Bill Andriske Oval	E. Drury	

==== Round 3 ====
Home	Score	Away	Match information			
Home	Score	Away	Date and time	Venue	Referee	Video replay
Shellharbour Sharks	20 – 18	Nowra-Bomaderry Jets	Saturday, 30 April, 12:00	Ron Costello Oval	P. Lees	
Berry-Shoalhaven Heads Magpies	0 – 62	Gerringong Lions Red	Sunday, 1 May, 12:00	Kiama Showground	B. Simon	N/A
Milton-Ulladulla Bulldogs	4 – 50	Gerringong Lions Blue	Sunday, 1 May, 12:00	Bill Andriske Oval	E. Drury	
Warilla-Lake South Gorillas	10 – 48	Albion Park-Oak Flats Eagles	Sunday, 1 May, 12:00	Cec Glenholmes Oval	K. Mounfield	
Southern Highlands Storm	12 – 38	Stingrays of Shellharbour	Sunday, 1 May, 15:00	Loseby Park	D. Chambelain	N/A

==== Round 4 ====
Home	Score	Away	Match information			
Home	Score	Away	Date and time	Venue	Referee	Video replay
Gerringong Lions Blue	40 – 4	Shellharbour Sharks	Saturday, 7 May, 12:00	Micheal Cronin Oval	B. Simon	
Milton-Ulladulla Bulldogs	26 – 18	Gerringong Lions Red	Saturday, 7 May, 15:30	Bill Andriske Oval	D. Chamberlain	
Nowra-Bomaderry Jets	34 – 6	Berry-Shoalhaven Heads Magpies	Sunday, 8 May, 12:00	Bomaderry Sporting Complex	A. Ellem	N/A
Stingrays of Shellharbour	34 – 18	Warilla-Lake South Gorillas	Sunday, 8 May, 12:00	Flinders Field	K. Mounfield	N/A
Southern Highlands Storm	4 – 54	Albion Park-Oak Flats Eagles	Sunday, 8 May, 13:30	Loseby Park	R. Boag	N/A

==== Round 5 ====
Home	Score	Away	Match information			
Home	Score	Away	Date and time	Venue	Referee	Video replay
Gerringong Lions Blue	–	Nowra-Bomaderry Jets	Saturday, 14 May, 12:00	Micheal Cronin Oval		
Milton-Ulladulla Bulldogs	–	Shellharbour Sharks	Saturday, 14 May, 12:00	Bill Andriske Oval		
Albion Park-Oak Flats Eagles	–	Berry-Shoalhaven Heads Magpies	Sunday, 15 May, 12:00	Centenary Oval		
Stingrays of Shellharbour	–	Gerringong Lions Red	Sunday, 15 May, 12:00	Flinders Field		
Warilla-Lake South Gorillas	–	Southern Highlands Storm	Sunday, 15 May, 12:00	Cec Glenholmes Oval		

==== Round 6 ====
Home	Score	Away	Match information			
Home	Score	Away	Date and time	Venue	Referee	Video replay
Gerringong Lions Red	–	Gerringong Lions Blue	Saturday, 21 May, 11:00	Kiama Showground		N/A
Albion Park-Oak Flats Eagles	–	Milton-Ulladulla Bulldogs	Saturday, 21 May, 12:00	Centenary Oval		N/A
Shellharbour Sharks	–	Stingrays of Shellharbour	Saturday, 21 May, 12:00	Ron Costello Oval		
Nowra-Bomaderry Jets	–	Southern Highlands Storm	Sunday, 22 May, 12:00	Bomaderry Sporting Complex		
Warilla-Lake South Gorillas	–	Berry-Shoalhaven Heads Magpies	Sunday, 22 May, 12:00	Cec Glenholmes Oval		N/A

==== Round 7 ====
Home	Score	Away	Match information			
Home	Score	Away	Date and time	Venue	Referee	Video replay
Shellharbour Sharks	–	Berry-Shoalhaven Heads Magpies	Saturday, 28 May, 12:00	Ron Costello Oval		
Albion Park-Oak Flats Eagles	–	Gerringong Lions Red	Sunday, 29 May, 12:00	Centenary Field		
Nowra-Bomaderry Jets	–	Stingrays of Shellharbour	Sunday, 29 May, 12:00	Bomaderry Sporting Complex		
Warilla-Lake South Gorillas	–	Gerringong Lions Blue	Sunday, 29 May, 12:00	Cec Glenholmes Oval		
Southern Highlands Storm	–	Milton-Ulladulla Bulldogs	Sunday, 29 May, 14:00	Loseby Park		

==== Round 8 ====
Home	Score	Away	Match information			
Home	Score	Away	Date and time	Venue	Referee	Video replay
Gerringong Lions Red	–	Shellharbour Sharks	Saturday, 4 June, 10:30	Michael Cronin Oval		
Berry-Shoalhaven Heads Magpies	–	Southern Highlands Storm	Saturday, 4 June, 12:00	Berry Showground		
Gerringong Lions Blue	–	Albion Park-Oak Flats Eagles	Saturday, 4 June, 12:00	Michael Cronin Oval		
Nowra-Bomaderry Jets	–	Warilla-Lake South Gorillas	Sunday, 5 June, 12:00	Bomaderry Sporting Complex		
Stingrays of Shellharbour	–	Milton-Ulladulla Bulldogs	Sunday, 5 June, 12:30	Flinders Field		

==== Round 9 ====
Home	Score	Away	Match information			
Home	Score	Away	Date and time	Venue	Referee	Video replay
Berry-Shoalhaven Heads Magpies	–	Gerringong Lions Blue	Saturday, 18 June, 12:00	Berry Showground		
Albion Park-Oak Flats Eagles	–	Stingrays of Shellharbour	Sunday, 19 June, 12:00	Centenary Field		
Nowra-Bomaderry Jets	–	Milton-Ulladulla Bulldogs	Sunday, 19 June, 12:00	Bomaderry Sporting Complex		
Shellharbour Sharks	–	Warilla-Lake South Gorillas	Sunday, 19 June, 12:00	Ron Costello Oval		
Southern Highlands Storm	–	Gerringong Lions Red	Sunday, 19 June, 13:30	Community Oval		

==== Round 10 ====
Home	Score	Away	Match information			
Home	Score	Away	Date and time	Venue	Referee	Video replay
Gerringong Lions Red	–	Warilla-Lake South Gorillas	Saturday, 25 June, 10:30	Michael Cronin Oval		
Berry-Shoalhaven Heads Magpies	–	Milton-Ulladulla Bulldogs	Saturday, 25 June, 12:00	Berry Showground		
Gerringong Lions Blue	–	Stingrays of Shellharbour	Saturday, 25 June, 12:00	Michael Cronin Oval		
Southern Highlands Storm	–	Shellharbour Sharks	Saturday, 25 June, 13:30	Community Oval		
Albion Park-Oak Flats Eagles	–	Nowra-Bomaderry Jets	Sunday, 26 June, 12:00	Centenary Field		

==== Round 11 ====
Home	Score	Away	Match information			
Home	Score	Away	Date and time	Venue	Referee	Video replay
Nowra-Bomaderry Jets	–	Gerringong Lions Red	Sunday, 3 July, 11:00	Bomaderry Sporting Complex		
Shellharbour Sharks	–	Albion Park-Oak Flats Eagles	Sunday, 3 July, 12:00	Ron Costello Oval		
Warilla-Lake South Gorillas	–	Milton-Ulladulla Bulldogs	Sunday, 3 July, 12:00	Cec Glenholmes Oval		
Stingrays of Shellharbour	–	Berry-Shoalhaven Heads Magpies	Sunday, 3 July, 12:30	Flinders Field		
Southern Highlands Storm	–	Gerringong Lions Blue	Sunday, 3 July, 13:30	Community Oval		

==== Round 12 ====
Home	Score	Away	Match information			
Home	Score	Away	Date and time	Venue	Referee	Video replay
Gerringong Lions Red	–	Berry-Shoalhaven Heads Magpies	Saturday, 9 July, 10:30	Michael Cronin Oval		
Gerringong Lions Blue	–	Milton-Ulladulla Bulldogs	Saturday, 9 July, 12:00	Michael Cronin Oval		
Nowra-Bomaderry Jets	–	Shellharbour Sharks	Saturday, 9 July, 12:00	Bomaderry Sporting Complex		
Stingrays of Shellharbour	–	Southern Highlands Storm	Saturday, 9 July, 12:00	Flinders Field		
Albion Park-Oak Flats Eagles	–	Warilla-Lake South Gorillas	Sunday, 10 July 12:00	Centenary Field		

==== Round 13 ====
Home	Score	Away	Match information			
Home	Score	Away	Date and time	Venue	Referee	Video replay
Albion Park-Oak Flats Eagles	–	Southern Highlands Storm	Saturday, 16 July, 11:00	Centenary Field		
Berry-Shoalhaven Heads Magpies	–	Nowra-Bomaderry Jets	Saturday, 16 July, 12:00	Berry Showground		
Gerringong Lions Red	–	Milton-Ulladulla Bulldogs	Saturday, 16 July, 14:00	Michael Cronin Oval		
Shellharbour Sharks	–	Gerringong Lions Blue	Sunday, 17 July, 12:00	Ron Costello Oval		
Warilla-Lake South Gorillas	–	Stingrays of Shellharbour	Sunday, 17 July, 12:00	Cec Glenholmes Oval		

==== Round 14 ====
Home	Score	Away	Match information			
Home	Score	Away	Date and time	Venue	Referee	Video replay
Berry-Shoalhaven Heads Magpies	–	Albion Park-Oak Flats Eagles	Saturday, 23 July, 12:00	Berry Showground		
Gerringong Lions Red	–	Stingrays of Shellharbour	Saturday, 23 July, 14:00	Michael Cronin Oval		
Nowra-Bomaderry Jets	–	Gerringong Lions Blue	Sunday, 24 July, 12:00	Bomaderry Sporting Complex		
Shellharbour Sharks	–	Milton-Ulladulla Bulldogs	Sunday, 24 July, 12:00	Ron Costello Oval		
Southern Highlands Storm	–	Warilla-Lake South Gorillas	Sunday, 24 July, 13:30	Community Oval		

==== Round 15 ====
Home	Score	Away	Match information			
Home	Score	Away	Date and time	Venue	Referee	Video replay
Gerringong Lions Blue	–	Gerringong Lions Red	Saturday, 6 August, 11:00	Michael Cronin Oval		
Berry-Shoalhaven Heads Magpies	–	Warilla-Lake South Gorillas	Saturday, 6 August, 12:00	Berry Showground		
Milton-Ulladulla Bulldogs	–	Albion Park-Oak Flats Eagles	Sunday, 7 August, 12:00	Bill Andriske Oval		
Stingrays of Shellharbour	–	Shellharbour Sharks	Sunday, 7 August, 12:00	Flinders Field		
Southern Highlands Storm	–	Nowra-Bomaderry Jets	Sunday, 7 August, 13:30	Community Oval		

==== Round 16 ====
Home	Score	Away	Match information			
Home	Score	Away	Date and time	Venue	Referee	Video replay
Gerringong Lions Red	–	Albion Park-Oak Flats Eagles	Saturday, 13 August, 09:30	Michael Cronin Oval		
Berry-Shoalhaven Heads Magpies	–	Shellharbour Sharks	Saturday, 13 August, 12:00	Berry Showground		
Gerringong Lions Blue	–	Warilla-Lake South Gorillas	Saturday, 13 August, 12:00	Michael Cronin Oval		
Milton-Ulladulla Bulldogs	–	Southern Highlands Storm	Saturday, 13 August, 12:00	Bill Andriske Oval		
Stingrays of Shellharbour	–	Nowra-Bomaderry Jets	Sunday, 14 August, 12:30	Flinders Field		

==== Round 17 ====
Home	Score	Away	Match information			
Home	Score	Away	Date and time	Venue	Referee	Video replay
Milton-Ulladulla Bulldogs	–	Stingrays of Shellharbour	Saturday, 20 August, 12:00	Bill Andriske Oval		
Albion Park-Oak Flats Eagles	–	Gerringong Lions Blue	Sunday, 21 August, 12:00	Centenary Field		
Shellharbour Sharks	–	Gerringong Lions Red	Sunday, 21 August, 12:00	Ron Costello Oval		
Warilla-Lake South Gorillas	–	Nowra-Bomaderry Jets	Sunday, 21 August, 12:00	Cec Glenholmes Oval		
Southern Highlands Storm	–	Berry-Shoalhaven Heads Magpies	Sunday, 21 August, 13:30	Community Oval		

==== Round 18 ====
Home	Score	Away	Match information			
Home	Score	Away	Date and time	Venue	Referee	Video replay
Gerringong Lions Red	–	Southern Highlands Storm	Saturday, 27 August, 10:30	Michael Cronin Oval		
Gerringong Lions Blue	–	Berry-Shoalhaven Heads Magpies	Saturday, 27 August, 12:00	Michael Cronin Oval		
Stingrays of Shellharbour	–	Albion Park-Oak Flats Eagles	Sunday, 28 August, 12:00	Flinders Field		
Milton-Ulladulla Bulldogs	–	Nowra-Bomaderry Jets	Sunday, 28 August, 12:00	Bill Andriske Oval		
Warilla-Lake South Gorillas	–	Shellharbour Sharks	Sunday, 28 August, 12:00	Cec Glenholmes Oval		

== Ladies League Tag Division 1 ==
2022 Group 7 Rugby League LLT1
- Duration: 9 April – 18 September
- Teams: 7
- Broadcast partners: Bar TV Sports

=== Teams ===
Colours	Club	Home ground(s)	2021 position
	Berry-Shoalhaven Heads Magpies	Berry Showground	6th
	Jamberoo Superoos	Kevin Walsh Oval	3rd
	Kiama Knights	Kiama Showground	N/A
	Milton-Ulladulla Bulldogs	Bill Andriske Oval	1st
	Nowra-Bomaderry Jets	Bomaderry Sports Complex	9th
	Stingrays of Shellharbour	Flinders Field	2nd
	Warilla-Lake South Gorillas	Cec Glenholmes Oval	5th

=== Ladder ===
Pos	Team	Pld	W	D	L	B	PF	PA	PD	Pts
1	Milton-Ulladulla Bulldogs	2	2	0	0	0	48	22	+26	4
2	Kiama Knights	1	1	0	0	0	38	4	+34	2
3	Stingrays of Shellharbour	2	1	0	1	0	44	16	+28	2
4	Jamberoo Superoos	1	0	0	0	1	0	0	0	2
5	Berry-Shoalhaven Heads Magpies	2	1	0	1	0	34	34	0	2
6	Warilla-Lake South Gorillas	2	0	0	1	1	8	32	-24	2
7	Nowra-Bomaderry Jets	2	0	0	2	0	8	72	-64	0

=== Regular season ===
==== Round 1 ====
Home	Score	Away	Match information			
Home	Score	Away	Date and time	Venue	Referee	Video replay
Milton-Ulladulla Bulldogs	P – P	Kiama Knights	TBC	Bill Andriske Oval		
Nowra-Bomaderry Jets	P – P	Berry-Shoalhaven Heads Magpies	TBC	Bomaderry Sporting Complex		
Stingrays of Shellharbour	P – P	Jamberoo Superoos	TBC	Flinders Field		
Bye(s): Warilla-Lake South Gorillas

- Round 1 was washed out and postponed to the washout catch up round on the weekend of 30/31 July.

==== Round 2 ====
Home	Score	Away	Match information			
Home	Score	Away	Date and time	Venue	Referee	Video replay
Berry-Shoalhaven Heads Magpies	0 – 30	Stingrays of Shellharbour	Saturday, 23 April, 11:00	Bomaderry Sports Complex	R. Boag	N/A
Milton-Ulladulla Bulldogs	32 – 8	Warilla-Lake South Gorillas	Sunday, 24 April, 11:00	Bill Andriske Oval	C. Spowart Lehmann	
Kiama Knights	38 – 4	Nowra-Bomaderry Jets	Sunday, 24 April, 12:30	Kiama Showground	W. Lees	N/A
Bye(s): Jamberoo Superoos

==== Round 3 ====
Home	Score	Away	Match information			
Home	Score	Away	Date and time	Venue	Referee	Video replay
Jamberoo Superoos	P – P	Kiama Knights	TBC	Kevin Walsh Oval		
Berry-Shoalhaven Heads Magpies	34 – 4	Nowra-Bomaderry Jets	Sunday, 1 May, 11:00	Kiama Showground	W. Lees	N/A
Milton-Ulladulla Bulldogs	16 – 14	Stingrays of Shellharbour	Sunday, 1 May, 11:00	Bill Andriske Oval	K. Whitford	
Bye(s): Warilla-Lake South Gorillas

- The fixture between Jamberoo and Kiama was postponed due to playing conditions.

==== Round 4 ====
Home	Score	Away	Match information			
Home	Score	Away	Date and time	Venue	Referee	Video replay
Milton-Ulladulla Bulldogs	P – P	Berry-Shoalhaven Heads Magpies	TBC	Bill Andriske Oval		N/A
Stingrays of Shellharbour	P – P	Kiama Knights	TBC	Flinders Field		N/A
Warilla-Lake South Gorillas	P – P	Jamberoo Superoos	TBC	Cec Glenholmes Oval		N/A
Bye(s): Nowra-Bomaderry Jets

==== Round 5 ====
Home	Score	Away	Match information			
Home	Score	Away	Date and time	Venue	Referee	Video replay
Kiama Knights	–	Stingrays of Shellharbour	Saturday, 21 May, 12:30	Kiama Showground	W. Lees	N/A
Nowra-Bomaderry Jets	–	Jamberoo Superoos	Sunday, 22 May, 11:00	Bomaderry Sporting Complex	G. Gaffney	
Warilla-Lake South Gorillas	–	Berry-Shoalhaven Heads Magpies	Sunday, 22 May, 11:00	Cec Glenholmes Oval	H. Hooper	
Bye(s): Milton-Ulladulla Bulldogs

==== Round 6 ====
Home	Score	Away	Match information			
Home	Score	Away	Date and time	Venue	Referee	Video replay
Jamberoo Superoos	–	Milton-Ulladulla Bulldogs	Saturday, 28 May, 11:00	Kevin Walsh Oval		
Nowra-Bomaderry Jets	–	Stingrays of Shellharbour	Sunday, 29 May, 11:00	Bomaderry Sporting Complex		
Warilla-Lake South Gorillas	–	Kiama Knights	Sunday, 29 May, 11:00	Cec Glenholmes Oval		
Bye(s): Berry-Shoalhaven Heads Magpies

==== Round 7 ====
Home	Score	Away	Match information			
Home	Score	Away	Date and time	Venue	Referee	Video replay
Berry-Shoalhaven Heads Magpies	–	Jamberoo Superoos	Saturday, 4 June, 11:00	Berry Showground		
Stingrays of Shellharbour	–	Milton-Ulladulla Bulldogs	Sunday, 5 June, 10:00	Flinders Field		
Nowra-Bomaderry Jets	–	Warilla-Lake South Gorillas	Sunday, 5 June, 11:00	Bomaderry Sporting Complex		
Bye(s): Kiama Knights

==== Round 8 ====
Home	Score	Away	Match information			
Home	Score	Away	Date and time	Venue	Referee	Video replay
Berry-Shoalhaven Heads Magpies	–	Warilla-Lake South Gorillas	Saturday, 18 June, 11:00	Berry Showground		
Kiama Knights	–	Jamberoo Superoos	Saturday, 18 June, 12:30	Kiama Showground		
Nowra-Bomaderry Jets	–	Milton-Ulladulla Bulldogs	Sunday, 19 June, 11:00	Nowra Showground		
Bye(s): Stingrays of Shellharbour

==== Round 9 ====
Home	Score	Away	Match information			
Home	Score	Away	Date and time	Venue	Referee	Video replay
Jamberoo Superoos	–	Stingrays of Shellharbour	Saturday, 25 June, 12:30	Kevin Walsh Oval		
Kiama Knights	–	Warilla-Lake South Gorillas	Sunday, 26 June, 12:30	Kiama Showground		
Bye(s): Berry-Shoalhaven Heads Magpies, Milton-Ulladulla Bulldogs, Nowra-Bomaderry Jets

==== Round 10 ====
Home	Score	Away	Match information			
Home	Score	Away	Date and time	Venue	Referee	Video replay
Warilla-Lake South Gorillas	–	Nowra-Bomaderry Jets	Saturday, 2 July, 11:00	Cec Glenholmes Oval		
Stingrays of Shellharbour	–	Berry-Shoalhaven Heads Magpies	Sunday, 3 July, 10:00	Flinders Field		
Nowra-Bomaderry Jets	–	Kiama Knights	Sunday, 3 July, 12:30	Bomaderry Sporting Complex		
Bye(s): Jamberoo Superoos

==== Round 11 ====
Home	Score	Away	Match information			
Home	Score	Away	Date and time	Venue	Referee	Video replay
Nowra-Bomaderry Jets	–	Milton-Ulladulla Bulldogs	Saturday, 9 July, 11:00	Bomaderry Sporting Complex		
Stingrays of Shellharbour	–	Jamberoo Superoos	Saturday, 9 July, 11:00	Flinders Field		
Kiama Knights	–	Berry-Shoalhaven Heads Magpies	Sunday, 10 July, 12:30	Kiama Showground		
Bye(s): Warilla-Lake South Gorillas

==== Round 12 ====
Home	Score	Away	Match information			
Home	Score	Away	Date and time	Venue	Referee	Video replay
Berry-Shoalhaven Heads Magpies	–	Nowra-Bomaderry Jets	Saturday, 16 July, 11:00	Berry Showground		
Milton-Ulladulla Bulldogs	–	Stingrays of Shellharbour	Sunday, 17 July, 11:00	Bill Andriske Oval		
Kiama Knights	–	Milton-Ulladulla Bulldogs	Sunday, 17 July, 12:30	Kiama Showground		
Bye(s): Jamberoo Superoos

==== Round 13 ====
Home	Score	Away	Match information			
Home	Score	Away	Date and time	Venue	Referee	Video replay
Berry-Shoalhaven Heads Magpies	–	Milton-Ulladulla Bulldogs	Saturday, 23 July, 11:00	Berry Showground		
Jamberoo Superoos	–	Nowra-Bomaderry Jets	Saturday, 23 July, 11:00	Kevin Walsh Oval		
Bye(s): Kiama Knights, Nowra-Bomaderry Jets, Stingrays of Shellharbour

==== Round 14 ====
Home	Score	Away	Match information			
Home	Score	Away	Date and time	Venue	Referee	Video replay
Berry-Shoalhaven Heads Magpies	–	Kiama Knights	Saturday, 6 August, 11:00	Berry Showground		
Jamberoo Superoos	–	Nowra-Bomaderry Jets	Saturday, 6 August, 12:30	Kevin Walsh Oval		
Stingrays of Shellharbour	–	Warilla-Lake South Gorillas	Sunday, 7 August, 11:00	Flinders Field		
Bye(s): Milton-Ulladulla Bulldogs

==== Round 15 ====
Home	Score	Away	Match information			
Home	Score	Away	Date and time	Venue	Referee	Video replay
Milton-Ulladulla Bulldogs	–	Jamberoo Superoos	Saturday, 13 August, 11:00	Bill Andriske Oval		
Stingrays of Shellharbour	–	Nowra-Bomaderry Jets	Saturday, 13 August, 11:30	Flinders Field		
Kiama Knights	–	Warilla-Lake South Gorillas	Sunday, 14 August, 12:30	Kiama Showground		
Bye(s): Berry-Shoalhaven Heads Magpies

==== Round 16 ====
Home	Score	Away	Match information			
Home	Score	Away	Date and time	Venue	Referee	Video replay
Jamberoo Superoos	–	Berry-Shoalhaven Heads Magpies	Saturday, 20 August, 11:00	Kevin Walsh Oval		
Milton-Ulladulla Bulldogs	–	Stingrays of Shellharbour	Saturday, 20 August, 11:00	Bill Andriske Oval		
Warilla-Lake South Gorillas	–	Nowra-Bomaderry Jets	Sunday, 21 August, 11:00	Cec Glenholmes Oval		
Bye(s): Kiama Knights

==== Round 17 ====
Home	Score	Away	Match information			
Home	Score	Away	Date and time	Venue	Referee	Video replay
Jamberoo Superoos	–	Kiama Knights	Saturday, 27 August, 12:30	Kevin Walsh Oval		
Milton-Ulladulla Bulldogs	–	Nowra-Bomaderry Jets	Sunday, 28 August, 11:00	Bill Andriske Oval		
Warilla-Lake South Gorillas	–	Berry-Shoalhaven Heads Magpies	Sunday, 28 August, 11:00	Cec Glenholmes Oval		
Bye(s): Stingrays of Shellharbour

== Ladies League Tag Division 2 ==
2022 Group 7 Rugby League LLT2
- Duration: 9 April – 18 September
- Teams: 9
- Broadcast partners: Bar TV Sports

=== Teams ===
Colours	Club	Home ground(s)	2021 position
	Albion Park-Oak Flats Eagles	Centenary Field	9th
	Berry-Shoalhaven Heads Magpies	Berry Showground	7th
	Gerringong Lions	Michael Cronin Oval	8th
	Jamberoo Superoos	Kevin Walsh Oval	6th
	Milton-Ulladulla Bulldogs	Bill Andriske Oval	4th
	Shellharbour Sharks	Ron Costello Oval	1st
	Stingrays of Shellharbour	Flinders Field	2nd
	Sussex Inlet Panthers	Finkernagle Oval	N/A
	Warilla-Lake South Gorillas	Cec Glenholmes Oval	3rd

=== Ladder ===
Pos	Team	Pld	W	D	L	B	PF	PA	PD	Pts
1	Shellharbour Sharks	2	2	0	0	0	60	12	+48	4
2	Milton-Ulladulla Bulldogs	2	2	0	0	0	40	4	+36	4
3	Stingrays of Shellharbour	1	1	0	0	0	8	4	+4	2
4	Gerringong Lions	2	1	0	1	0	18	18	0	2
5	Berry-Shoalhaven Heads Magpies	2	0	0	1	1	4	8	-4	2
6	Warilla-Lake South Gorillas	2	1	0	1	0	28	52	-24	2
7	Sussex Inlet Panthers	2	0	0	1	1	0	26	-26	2
8	Jamberoo Superoos	1	0	0	1	0	12	14	-2	0
9	Albion Park-Oak Flats Eagles	2	0	0	2	0	30	62	-32	0

=== Regular season ===
==== Round 1 ====
Home	Score	Away	Match information			
Home	Score	Away	Date and time	Venue	Referee	Video replay
Milton-Ulladulla Bulldogs	P – P	Berry-Shoalhaven Heads Magpies	TBC	Bill Andriske Oval		
Shellharbour Sharks	P – P	Jamberoo Superoos	TBC	Ron Costello Oval		
Stingrays of Shellharbour	P – P	Gerringong Lions	TBC	Flinders Field		
Sussex Inlet Panthers	P – P	Albion Park-Oak Flats Eagles	TBC	Finkernagel Oval		
Bye(s): Warilla-Lake South Gorillas

- Round 1 was washed out and postponed to the washout catch up round on the weekend of 30/31 July.

==== Round 2 ====
Home	Score	Away	Match information			
Home	Score	Away	Date and time	Venue	Referee	Video replay
Gerringong Lions	14 – 12	Jamberoo Superoos	Saturday, 23 April, 09:30	Michael Cronin Oval	M. Bonnie	N/A
Berry-Shoalhaven Heads Magpies	4 – 8	Stingrays of Shellharbour	Saturday, 23 April, 10:00	Bomaderry Sports Complex	G. Nolan	N/A
Albion Park-Oak Flats Eagles	12 – 34	Shellharbour Sharks	Saturday, 23 April, 11:00	Centenary Field	H. Hooper	N/A
Milton-Ulladulla Bulldogs	34 – 0	Warilla-Lake South Gorillas	Sunday, 24 April, 10:00	Bill Andriske Oval	K. Thompson	
Bye(s): Sussex Inlet Panthers

==== Round 3 ====
Home	Score	Away	Match information			
Home	Score	Away	Date and time	Venue	Referee	Video replay
Jamberoo Superoos	P – P	Stingrays of Shellharbour	TBC	Kevin Walsh Oval		
Shellharbour Sharks	26 – 0	Sussex Inlet Panthers	Saturday, 30 April, 11:00	Ron Costello Oval	M. Bonnie	
Milton-Ulladulla Bulldogs	6 – 4	Gerringong Lions	Sunday, 1 May, 10:00	Bill Andriske Oval	H. Hooper	
Warilla-Lake South Gorillas	28 – 18	Albion Park-Oak Flats Eagles	Sunday, 1 May, 11:00	Cec Glenholmes Oval	M. Bonnie	N/A
Bye(s): Berry-Shoalhaven Heads Magpies

- The fixture between Jamberoo and Stingrays was postponed due to unplayable playing conditions.

==== Round 4 ====
Home	Score	Away	Match information			
Home	Score	Away	Date and time	Venue	Referee	Video replay
Gerringong Lions	14 – 18	Shellharbour Sharks	Saturday, 7 May, 10:00	Michael Cronin Oval	G. Gaffney	
Jamberoo Superoos	16 – 20	Albion Park-Oak Flats Eagles	Saturday, 7 May, 10:00	Kevin Walsh Oval	M. Bonnie	
Sussex Inlet Panthers	6 – 52	Berry-Shoalhaven Heads Magpies	Saturday, 7 May, 13:00	Finkernagel Oval	E. Drury	N/A
Stingrays of Shellharbour	20 – 12	Warilla-Lake South Gorillas	Sunday, 8 May, 09:30	Flinders Field	W. Lees	N/A
Bye(s): Milton-Ulladulla Bulldogs

==== Round 5 ====
Home	Score	Away	Match information			
Home	Score	Away	Date and time	Venue	Referee	Video replay
Milton-Ulladulla Bulldogs	P – P	Shellharbour Sharks	Saturday, 14 May, 10:00	Bill Andriske Oval		
Gerringong Lions	P – P	Sussex Inlet Panthers	Saturday, 14 May, 11:00	Michael Cronin Oval		
Warilla-Lake South Gorillas	P – P	Jamberoo Superoos	Sunday, 15 May, 10:00	Cec Glenholmes Oval		
Albion Park-Oak Flats Eagles	P – P	Berry-Shoalhaven Heads Magpies	Sunday, 15 May, 11:00	Centenary Field		
Bye(s): Stingrays of Shellharbour

==== Round 6 ====
Home	Score	Away	Match information			
Home	Score	Away	Date and time	Venue	Referee	Video replay
Shellharbour Sharks	–	Berry-Shoalhaven Heads Magpies	Saturday, 21 May, 10:00	Ron Costello Oval	W. Drury	N/A
Jamberoo Superoos	–	Milton-Ulladulla Bulldogs	Saturday, 21 May, 10:00	Kevin Walsh Oval	M. Bonnie	N/A
Sussex Inlet Panthers	–	Stingrays of Shellharbour	Saturday, 21 May, 13:00	Finkernagle Oval	E. Drury	N/A
Warilla-Lake South Gorillas	–	Gerringong Lions	Sunday, 22 May, 10:00	Cec Glenholmes Oval	C. Spowart Lehmann	
Bye(s): Albion Park-Oak Flats Eagles

==== Round 7 ====
Home	Score	Away	Match information			
Home	Score	Away	Date and time	Venue	Referee	Video replay
Albion Park-Oak Flats Eagles	–	Gerringong Lions	Saturday, 4 June, 10:00	Centenary Field		
Berry-Shoalhaven Heads Magpies	–	Jamberoo Superoos	Saturday, 4 June, 10:00	Berry Showground		
Shellharbour Sharks	–	Milton-Ulladulla Bulldogs	Saturday, 4 June, 10:00	Ron Costello Oval		
Sussex Inlet Panthers	–	Warilla-Lake South Gorillas	Saturday, 4 June, 10:00	Finkernagel Oval		
Bye(s): Stingrays of Shellharbour

==== Round 8 ====
Home	Score	Away	Match information			
Home	Score	Away	Date and time	Venue	Referee	Video replay
Albion Park-Oak Flats Eagles	–	Stingrays of Shellharbour	Saturday, 18 June, 10:00	Centenary Field		
Gerringong Lions	–	Sussex Inlet Panthers	Saturday, 18 June, 10:00	Michael Cronin Oval		
Jamberoo Superoos	–	Shellharbour Sharks	Saturday, 18 June, 10:00	Kevin Walsh Oval		
Warilla-Lake South Gorillas	–	Milton-Ulladulla Bulldogs	Saturday, 18 June, 10:00	Cec Glenholmes Oval		
Bye(s): Berry-Shoalhaven Heads Magpies

==== Round 9 ====
Home	Score	Away	Match information			
Home	Score	Away	Date and time	Venue	Referee	Video replay
Berry-Shoalhaven Heads Magpies	–	Albion Park-Oak Flats Eagles	Saturday, 25 June, 10:00	Berry Showground		
Milton-Ulladulla Bulldogs	–	Gerringong Lions	Saturday, 25 June, 10:00	Bill Andriske Oval		
Shellharbour Sharks	–	Warilla-Lake South Gorillas	Saturday, 25 June, 10:00	Ron Costello Oval		
Sussex Inlet Panthers	–	Stingrays of Shellharbour	Saturday, 25 June, 10:00	Finkernagel Oval		
Bye(s): Jamberoo Superoos

==== Round 10 ====
Home	Score	Away	Match information			
Home	Score	Away	Date and time	Venue	Referee	Video replay
Albion Park-Oak Flats Eagles	–	Jamberoo Superoos	Saturday, 2 July, 10:00	Centenary Field		
Gerringong Lions	–	Warilla-Lake South Gorillas	Saturday, 2 July, 10:00	Michael Cronin Oval		
Stingrays of Shellharbour	–	Milton-Ulladulla Bulldogs	Saturday, 2 July, 10:00	Flinders Field		
Sussex Inlet Panthers	–	Berry-Shoalhaven Heads Magpies	Saturday, 2 July, 10:00	Finkernagel Oval		
Bye(s): Shellharbour Sharks

==== Round 11 ====
Home	Score	Away	Match information			
Home	Score	Away	Date and time	Venue	Referee	Video replay
Jamberoo Superoos	–	Sussex Inlet Panthers	Saturday, 9 July, 10:00	Kevin Walsh Oval		
Milton-Ulladulla Bulldogs	–	Berry-Shoalhaven Heads Magpies	Saturday, 9 July, 10:00	Bill Andriske Oval		
Shellharbour Sharks	–	Gerringong Lions	Saturday, 9 July, 10:00	Ron Costello Oval		
Warilla-Lake South Gorillas	–	Stingrays of Shellharbour	Saturday, 9 July, 10:00	Cec Glenholmes Oval		
Bye(s): Albion Park-Oak Flats Eagles

==== Round 12 ====
Home	Score	Away	Match information			
Home	Score	Away	Date and time	Venue	Referee	Video replay
Albion Park-Oak Flats Eagles	–	Shellharbour Sharks	Saturday, 16 July, 10:00	Centenary Field		
Berry-Shoalhaven Heads Magpies	–	Warilla-Lake South Gorillas	Saturday, 16 July, 10:00	Berry Showground		
Milton-Ulladulla Bulldogs	–	Jamberoo Superoos	Saturday, 16 July, 10:00	Bill Andriske Oval		
Stingrays of Shellharbour	–	Gerringong Lions	Saturday, 16 July, 10:00	Flinders Field		
Bye(s): Sussex Inlet Panthers

==== Round 13 ====
Home	Score	Away	Match information			
Home	Score	Away	Date and time	Venue	Referee	Video replay
Albion Park-Oak Flats Eagles	–	Sussex Inlet Panthers	Saturday, 23 July, 10:00	Centenary Field		
Gerringong Lions	–	Berry-Shoalhaven Heads Magpies	Saturday, 23 July, 10:00	Michael Cronin Oval		
Shellharbour Sharks	–	Stingrays of Shellharbour	Saturday, 23 July, 10:00	Ron Costello Oval		
Warilla-Lake South Gorillas	–	Jamberoo Superoos	Saturday, 23 July, 10:00	Cec Glenholmes Oval		
Bye(s): Milton-Ulladulla Bulldogs

==== Round 14 ====
Home	Score	Away	Match information			
Home	Score	Away	Date and time	Venue	Referee	Video replay
Berry-Shoalhaven Heads Magpies	–	Stingrays of Shellharbour	Saturday, 6 August, 10:00	Berry Showground		
Jamberoo Superoos	–	Gerringong Lions	Saturday, 6 August, 10:00	Kevin Walsh Oval		
Milton-Ulladulla Bulldogs	–	Albion Park-Oak Flats Eagles	Saturday, 6 August, 10:00	Bill Andriske Oval		
Sussex Inlet Panthers	–	Shellharbour Sharks	Saturday, 6 August, 10:00	Finkernagel Oval		
Bye(s): Warilla-Lake South Gorillas

==== Round 15 ====
Home	Score	Away	Match information			
Home	Score	Away	Date and time	Venue	Referee	Video replay
Albion Park-Oak Flats Eagles	–	Warilla-Lake South Gorillas	Saturday, 13 August, 10:00	Centenary Field		
Shellharbour Sharks	–	Berry-Shoalhaven Heads Magpies	Saturday, 13 August, 10:00	Ron Costello Oval		
Stingrays of Shellharbour	–	Jamberoo Superoos	Saturday, 13 August, 10:00	Flinders Field		
Sussex Inlet Panthers	–	Milton-Ulladulla Bulldogs	Saturday, 13 August, 10:00	Finkernagel Oval		
Bye(s): Gerringong Lions

==== Round 16 ====
Home	Score	Away	Match information			
Home	Score	Away	Date and time	Venue	Referee	Video replay
Gerringong Lions	–	Albion Park-Oak Flats Eagles	Saturday, 20 August, 10:00	Michael Cronin Oval		
Jamberoo Superoos	–	Berry-Shoalhaven Heads Magpies	Saturday, 20 August, 10:00	Kevin Walsh Oval		
Milton-Ulladulla Bulldogs	–	Shellharbour Sharks	Saturday, 20 August, 10:00	Bill Andriske Oval		
Warilla-Lake South Gorillas	–	Sussex Inlet Panthers	Saturday, 20 August, 10:00	Cec Glenholmes Oval		
Bye(s): Stingrays of Shellharbour

==== Round 17 ====
Home	Score	Away	Match information			
Home	Score	Away	Date and time	Venue	Referee	Video replay
Milton-Ulladulla Bulldogs	–	Warilla-Lake South Gorillas	Saturday, 27 August, 10:00	Bill Andriske Oval		
Shellharbour Sharks	–	Jamberoo Superoos	Saturday, 27 August, 10:00	Ron Costello Oval		
Stingrays of Shellharbour	–	Albion Park-Oak Flats Eagles	Saturday, 27 August, 10:00	Flinders Field		
Sussex Inlet Panthers	–	Gerringong Lions	Saturday, 27 August, 10:00	Finkernagel Oval		
Bye(s): Berry-Shoalhaven Heads Magpies
