= Nowra Warriors =

Australian rugby league club, based in Nowra, NSW

Club information
- Full name: Nowra Rugby League Football Club
- Short name: The Warriors
- Colours: Black; Gold
- Founded: 1913; 112 years ago
- Exited: 2008; 17 years ago (merged to form Shoalhaven Jets)

Former details
- Ground(s): Nowra Showground, Nowra
- Competition: Group 7 Rugby League

Records
- Premierships: 10 (1919, 1934, 1938, 1955, 1957, 1959, 1977, 1981, 1993, 1996)
- Runners-up: 11 (1914, 1930, 1933, 1937, 1944, 1945, 1960, 1961, 1967, 1985, 1995)
- Minor premierships: ? (1944)

The Nowra Warriors are an Australian rugby league football team based in Nowra, a coastal town of the South Coast region. The club is a part of Country Rugby League and previously competed in the South Coast first grade competition since its inception in 1914 until they merged with Bomaderry in 2008 to form the Shoalhaven Jets. The Nowra Warriors still field teams in junior rugby league competitions.

== History ==
=== Pre-South Coast Rugby League (–1913) ===
Prior to joining the South Coast Rugby League competition when it began in 1914, the Warriors began as a successful rugby union team and in 1913 they unofficially won their first rugby league competition. This competition consisted of friendly matches in a Shoalhaven League not affiliated with the New South Wales Rugby League.

=== South Coast Competition (1914–2007) ===
Nowra Warriors were one of the eight founding members of South Coast Rugby League, and in the first season were runners-up to the Gerringong Lions after losing 11-10 in the final at Kiama Showground, Kiama. The Warriors only had to wait until 1919 to enjoy their first taste of success when they defeated Kiama 13-9 in the final replay (the score in the first final was 7-all). Nowra enjoyed some good periods of success throughout the 30s (2 titles, 3 runners-up), and the late 50s-early 60s (3 titles, 2 runners-up), and a further two titles in 1993 and 1996 before an on-field decline in performances.

=== Merger (2008–present) ===
In November 2007, it was decided that the Warriors would merge with long-term rivals the Bomaderry Swamp Rats for the 2008 season. Both teams had been struggling with performance and sponsorship (Bomaderry had been out of first grade for six years). In the past talks of merging had been quickly dismissed, but this time it was critical for both teams survival. It was announced that the newly merged team would be called the Shoalhaven Jets and their colours would be blue, gold, and black (blue and gold from Bomaderry, gold and black from Nowra).

== Notable Juniors ==
- Bruce McGuire (1986–92 Balmain Tigers & Canterbury Bulldogs)
- Sean Skelton (1991–95 Canterbury Bulldogs & Illawarra Steelers)
- Andrew Walker (1992–2004 St George Dragons, Sydney Roosters & Manly Sea Eagles)

== Honours ==
=== Team ===
- Group 7 Rugby League Premierships: 10

1919, 1934, 1938, 1955, 1957, 1959, 1977, 1981, 1993, 1996

- Group 7 Rugby League Runners-Up: 11

1914, 1930, 1933, 1937, 1944, 1945, 1960, 1961, 1967, 1985, 1995

- CRL Clayton Cup: None

=== Individual ===
- Group 7 Rugby League Player of the Year: 2

Peter Jirgens (1977), David Beckett (1981)

- Group 7 Rugby League Rookie of the Year: 5

Shayne Ashton (1977), Glen Jarrett (1981), Damian Brunton (1996), James Longbottom (1999), David Price (2000)

- Group 7 Rugby League Leading Point-scorer: 4

John Lonesborough (1981), Jeff Wellington (1994 & 1995), Leigh Ardler (2006)

- Group 7 Rugby League Leading Try-scorer: 2

Jeff Wellington (1994 & 1995)

- Group 7 Rugby League Most Promising Player Under 21: 1

Dean Moon (1994)

- Group 7 Rugby League U-18s Player of the Year: 3

Dean Lonesborough (1985), Matt Robards (1993), Darren McPherson (1995)

- Kevin Walsh Scholarship: 13

Mark Fisher (1979), Cliff Harris (1980), Sean Skelton (1987), Dean Moon (1992), James Longbottom (1997), Ben Wellington (1998), David Price (1999), Glenn McCallum (2001), Brent Hurley (2002), Jarred McNamara (2003), Graham Davidson & Lewis McCall (2004), Thomas Berry (2009)

Source: Group 7 History
