= Sean Skelton =

Former South Africa international rugby league footballer

Personal information
- Full name: Sean Skelton
- Born: 28 September 1971 (age 53)

Playing information
- Position: Hooker
Club
Years	Team	Pld	T	G	FG	P
1991–92	Canterbury-Bankstown	10	0	0	0	0
1993	South Sydney	13	1	0	0	4
1995	Illawarra Steelers	4	2	0	0	8
1997	Batley Bulldogs
	Total	27	3	0	0	12
Representative
Years	Team	Pld	T	G	FG	P
1997–00	South Africa	3	0	0	0	0
- Source: As of 16 January 2019

Sean Skelton (born 28 September 1971) is a former South Africa international rugby league footballer who represented South Africa in the 2000 Rugby League World Cup.

== Playing career ==
In 1987, Skelton played for the Nowra Warriors in the Group 7 Rugby League competition.

Skelton joined the Canterbury-Bankstown Bulldogs in 1989, Skelton captained the under-21s in 1990 and played ten NSWRL Premiership games between 1991 and 1992. He joined the South Sydney Rabbitohs in 1993.

In 1995, Skelton played for the Illawarra Steelers.

Skelton played three matches for South Africa between 1997 and 2000. Skelton played one match at the 2000 World Cup before breaking his hand.
