= Group 7 =

Group 7 may refer to:

- G7, an international group of finance minister
- Group 7 element, chemical element classification
- Halogens (alternative name)
- Group 7 Rugby League, rugby league competition in New South Wales, Australia
- Group 7 (motorsport), FIA classification for sports car racing
- Group Seven Children's Foundation, charitable organization
