= Milton-Ulladulla Bulldogs =

Australian rugby league club, based in Ulladulla, NSW

Club information
- Full name: Milton-Ulladulla Rugby League Football Club
- Nickname(s): The Bulldogs
- Colours: Primary: Pale Blue; Red; Secondary: White

Current details
- Ground(s): Bill Andriske Mollymook Oval, Mollymook
- Competition: Group 7 Rugby League

Records
- Premierships: 5 (1987, 1989, 2004, 2005, 2008)
- Runners-up: 2 (1979, 2002)
- Minor premierships: ? (2004)

The Milton-Ulladulla Bulldogs are an Australian rugby league football team based in Ulladulla, a coastal town in the South Coast region. The club is a part of Country Rugby League and has competed in the South Coast first grade competition since the 1930s.

== History ==
The Bulldogs originally competed in the Group 16 Rugby League competition before making the switch to the South Coast during the 1930s. Their success was far from instantaneous. It took the club until 1987 to win their inaugural first-grade premiership after five decades competing in the league. They have enjoyed relatively good success, however, in recent times. The Bulldogs made the final in 2002 before going down to Batemans Bay at the Tigers home ground, Mackay Park. In 2004, the Dogs did the double winning the minor premiership and taking out the title with a classy 50–12 performance over fifth-place playoff winning side, Berry Magpies, at Berry Showground. The Bulldogs made it back-to-back titles in 2005, with another good performance in the final, defeating minor premiers Albion Park-Oak Flats Eagles at Centenary Park, Albion Park, 34–22. In 2008, the Bulldogs took home the title again, this time win a home victory over minor premiers Shellharbour 36–24. In the same year the Under 18's were also victorious both games were played at home.

In 2013, the Bulldogs formed their first Women's League Tag team. In 2014, they won the Premiership Grand Final. The girls were Minor Premiers in 2015 but lost to rivals Kiama in the Grand Final. In 2017, the Under 18's coached by Peter Leffley were victorious and Jayden Millard was awarded the Under 18's Group 7 player of the year. In 2018 the under 18's were defeated in the grand final.

In 2018, the Milton-Ulladulla Bulldogs Senior club entered their first ever women's tackle side competing in the Under 18's division. This team were the Minor premiers but lost in the grand final.

== Notable Juniors ==
- Luke O'Donnell (1999–2013 Wests Tigers, North Queensland Cowboys, Huddersfield & Sydney Roosters)
- Gary Warburton (2008–11 Canterbury Bulldogs)
- Jack Murchie (2018–present Canberra Raiders)

== Honours ==
=== Team ===
- Group 7 Rugby League Premierships: 5

1987, 1989, 2004, 2005, 2008

- Group 7 Rugby League Runners-Up: 2

1979, 2002

- Clayton Cup: None
- Group 7 Women's League Tag Premierships: 1

2014

=== Individuals ===
- Michael Cronin Medal: 6

Greg Sherwin (2000)
Adam Stone (2004, 2005 & 2015)
Thomas Cook (2009)

- 'Group 7 Rugby League Player of the Year: 6"

Ken McIndoe (1987)
Mark Hensen (1991)
Cheyanne Hatch (2014, 2015, 2016 & 2018)

- Rookie of the Year: 4

Ron Mathie (1969)
Peter Thompson (1979)
Ian Long (1982)
Adam Stone (2004)

- Leading Point-scorer of the Year: 4

Brett Davis (1988)
Greg Sherwin (2003)
Justin Holbrook (2004)
Ebony Murray (2014)

- Leading Try-scorer of the Year: 8

Peter Oates (1982)
Brett Davis (1988)
Clinton Bennets (2001)
Greg Sherwin & Clinton Bennets (2003)
Justin Holbrook (2004)
Thomas Cook (2009)
Ebony Murray (2014)

- Kevin Walsh Scholarship: 6

Ben Saunders (1995)
Lewis Tait (2000)
Bryce Cummings (2002)
AJ Hatch (2007)
Harrison Miller (2008)
Alex Rossetto (2010)

- Under-18s Player of the Year: 2

Gary Warburton (2004 & 2005)
Jayden Millard (2017)

- Under-21s Player of the Year: 2

Adam Stone (2005)
Thomas Cook (2007)

Source: Group 7 History
