= Berry-Shoalhaven Heads Magpies =

Australian rugby league club, based in Berry, NSW

Club information
- Full name: Berry-Shoalhaven Heads Rugby League Football Club
- Nickname(s): The Magpies
- Colours: Black; White
- Founded: 1914; 111 years ago as Berry

Current details
- Ground(s): Berry Showground, Berry
- Coach: Luke Ryder
- Captain: Luke Ryder
- Competition: Group 7 Rugby League

Records
- Premierships: 12 (1923, 1926, 1928, 1935, 1936, 1937, 1941, 1952, 1953, 1954, 1966, 1967)
- Runners-up: 10 (1921, 1922, 1924, 1927, 1948, 1958, 1963, 1964, 2004, 2007)
- Minor premierships: 8 (1923, 1927, 1936, 1937, 1941, 1952, 1953, 1990)

The Berry-Shoalhaven Heads Magpies are an Australian rugby league football team based in Berry, a country town of the South Coast region. The Magpies are a foundation club of the Group 7 Rugby League and are members of Country Rugby League.

== History ==
The Berry-Shoalhaven Heads Magpies have a very rich history in Rugby League in the South Coast. The club was founded in 1914 as a part of South Coast Rugby League along with seven other foundation clubs, three of which still compete in the league, Kiama, Gerringong, and Jamberoo.

The club has been one of the most successful in the league in term of premierships won with 12 overall, only Gerringong having won more (16 titles). They Magpies have also twice completed a hat-trick of first grade premierships (and is currently the only club to have done this). The streaks were from 1935–37 and 1952–54. They again won the premiership in 1966 and 1967, but have not won it since. The Magpies took a brief stint in 2002 out of first grade before returning with vengeance stronger in 2003. They have made the grand final twice in recent years only to lose at home convincingly by minor premiers, Milton-Ulladulla Bulldogs, 52–10 on home soil in 2004 after winning a mid-week fifth-place playoff to make semifinals. Then again in 2007, the Magpies lost to minor premiers, Albion Park-Oak Flats Eagles 44–10.

More recently, in 2010, the club had a visit by Collingwood president and Channel Nine media personality Eddie McGuire in an effort to link the two Magpie clubs. With McGuire, was other media personality and Collingwood fan Peter Donegan. Former Berry president Michael O'Dwyer worked for Capital TV while they worked for Network Ten in Melbourne, and has since worked closely with the two for several years.

== Supporters ==
Eddie McGuire was presented with a Magpies jumper and has been quoted saying, "my Group 7 team will always be Berry-Shoalhaven Heads".

=== Colours ===
The team's colours are black and white and play out of Berry Showground, Berry.

== Honours ==
=== Team ===
- Group 7 Rugby League Premierships: 12

1923, 1926, 1928, 1935, 1936, 1937, 1941, 1952, 1953, 1954, 1966, 1967

- Group 7 Rugby League Runners-Up: 10

1921, 1922, 1924, 1927, 1948, 1958, 1963, 1964, 2004, 2007

- First Grade Minor Premierships: 8

1923, 1927, 1936, 1937, 1941, 1952, 1953, 1990

- Group 7 Second Grade Premierships: 1

2009

- CRL Clayton Cup: None

=== Individuals ===
- Michael Cronin Medal: 2

Brett Herron (1988), Paul Skewes (2007)

- Group 7 Player of the Year: 1

Jason Berg (1996)

- Rookie of the Year: 1

Sam Burns (2006)

- Leading Point-scorer of the Year: None

- Leading Try-scorer of the Year: 1

Matt Gallagher (2008)

- Under-18s Player of the Year: 1

Nathan Benny (2006)

- Under-21s Player of the Year: 1

John Walker (1996)

- Kevin Walsh Scholarship: 9

Brett Stephens (1981), Pat Hayburn (1986), Shane McDermott (1987), Phil Duncan (1993), Nathan Byrne (1994), Scott Monaghan (1995), Ben Byrne (1997), Tim O'Sullivan (1998), Mitchell Liddicoat (2009)

Source: Group 7 History
