= Batemans Bay Tigers =

Australian rugby league club, based in Batemans Bay, NSW

Club information
- Full name: Batemans Bay Rugby League Football Club Inc.
- Nickname(s): The Tigers
- Colours: Gold/Orange; Black; White
- Founded: 1897; 128 years ago

Current details
- Ground(s): Mackay Park, Batemans Bay
- Competition: Group 16 Rugby League

Records
- Premierships: 6 (1967, 1979, 1986, 1988, 1992, 2002)
- Runners-up: 3 (1999, 2000, 2001)
- Minor premierships: 1 (1993)

The Batemans Bay Tigers (or sometimes simplified to Bay Tigers) are an Australian rugby league football team based in Batemans Bay, a coastal town of the South Coast region. The club is a part of Country Rugby League and have competed in the Group 16 Rugby League (Far South Coast) first grade competition in two stints, the current since 2014. From 1978 to 2013, they were a part of South Coast. first grade competition since 1978. Prior to this, they were a part of Group 16 Rugby League (Far South Coast).

== History ==
=== Group 16 ===
Like many other rugby league teams, the Tigers started out as a Rugby Union club before Rugby League came to the area. They had been a part of Group 16 Rugby League sub-group competitions, before the reorganisation into a single group in 1960.

The club won the 1967 premiership under Captain Coach John Carberry, who came to the Bay from the strong Port Kembla club. John also took the side to the 1968 Grand Final, but they went down to Pambula 13–7. There was lower grade success in this period: a Reserve grade Premiership in 1967 under Captain Coach Peter Fitzgerald and a brace of Under 18 titles in 1968 and 1969 under coach John Ladmore.

The club switched to Group 19 (Molonglo Shield) in 1972 then on to Group 7 in 1978.

=== Group 7 (1978–2013) ===
The Tigers were quickly successful in snatching their first premiership in this group in their second season. The Tigers would go on to win a further four titles, in the following years (1986, 1988, 1992, 2002). Reserve Grade Premierships were added in 1984,1986 and 1993. Their last premiership came off the back of three grand final losses to Albion Park-Oak Flats Eagles (30–16 and 31–18 in 1999 and 2000 respectively) and to the Shellharbour Sharks in 2001. They beat the Milton/Ulladulla Bulldogs at their home ground in the grand final win in 2002.

=== Group 16 ===
The club returned to Group 16 mid-decade.

Ex Sydney first grade player Matt Cross was appointed coach of the side for the 2015 season.

=== Colours ===
The team's colours are Black and Gold; they were originally black and yellow which were the colours chosen by the then committee to honour Dr. Mackay who donated the land now known as Mackay Park to the town for recreational purposes. The black and Yellow were Duncan Forbes Mackays school colours. The club's emblem is now a Wests Tigers logo. For 35 years the logo was a caricature of a running tiger carrying the football, and before that (in Group 16) the logo was a tiger's head similar to the old Balmain Tigers )

== Notable Juniors ==
- Ben Cross (2003–13 Melbourne Storm, Canberra, Newcastle, Leeds, Widnes & Wigan, NSW and Australia)
- Matt Cross (2005–10 Melbourne Storm, Penrith Panthers, Gold Coast & Manly)
- Rod Elliott (Penrith Panthers 68, 69, 70, 71)
- Adam O'Brien (rugby league coach)
- Jack Colovatti – Italy international who played at the 2021 Rugby League World Cup

== Honours ==
- Team of the Century
- Kevin Connell
- Baden Payne

=== Team ===
- Group 16 Rugby League Premierships: First Grade 1939, 1948, 1953, 1967
- Reserve grade Premierships :: 1967
- Under 18's Premierships :: 1968, 1969.
- Group 7 Rugby League Premierships: 5

1979, 1986, 1988, 1992, 2002 Reserve grade 1984,1986, 1993

- Group 7 Rugby League Runners-Up: 3

1999, 2000, 2001

- CRL Clayton Cup: None
