= Jamberoo Superoos =

Australian rugby league club, based in Jamberoo, NSW

Club information
- Full name: Jamberoo Rugby League Football Club
- Nickname: The Superoos
- Colours: Green; Red
- Founded: 1913; 113 years ago

Current details
- Ground: Kevin Walsh Oval, Jamberoo
- Coach: Jono Dallas
- Captain: Jono Dallas
- Competition: Group 7 Rugby League

Records
- Premierships: 9 (1915, 1927, 1931, 1932, 1951, 1958, 1961, 1974, 2017)
- Runners-up: 9 (1920, 1926, 1938, 1939, 1946, 1947, 1950, 1954, 1956)
- Minor premierships: 6 (1931, 1939, 1951, 1954, 1961, 2017)

The Jamberoo Superoos are an Australian rugby league football team based in Jamberoo, a country town of the Illawarra region. The club is a part of Country Rugby League and have competed in the South Coast first grade competition since its inception in 1914.

== History ==
The Jamberoo Superoos started life like many other clubs in the area as a Rugby Union team, with players deciding to make the switch in 1913. Eight local clubs created the first South Coast tournament in 1914 of which Jamberoo was apart. The Superoos first ever game was against Kangaroo Valley on 30 May 1914. Jamberoo won the game 3-0. The following year the side won the first of their eight premierships before the tournament's hiatus due to World War I. They won their next premiership in 1927 and in doing so played in the first ever championship between the premiers of the Illawarra and South Coast competitions. The Superoos defeated Port Kembla 15-11 and thus were hailed the best team of the region. Jamberoo won two more premiership (1931 and 1932) in the middle of the newly merged Kiama-Bombo premierships of 1930 and 1933. The Superoos wouldn't win another premiership until 1951. The last premiership they won was in 1974.

The club went through some tough periods out of first grade. They made a short-lived comeback in 1988 and 1989 before departing first grade competition for almost twenty years.

=== Return to First Grade (2009–present) ===
The Jamberoo Superoos returned to Group 7 Rugby League First Grade in 2008 after reaching the reserve grade grand final and semi-final in 2007 and 2008. The club recruited experienced players alongside local juniors. In 2017, Jamberoo won the Group 7 Grand Final. During the 2021 season, the team remained undefeated in seven games, scoring 264 points and conceding 48 before the season was abandoned because of the COVID-19 pandemic.

=== Colours ===
The team's colours are green, red and black and wear a strip similar to that of NRL club the South Sydney Rabbitohs.

== Honours ==
=== Team ===
- Group 7 Rugby League Premierships: 9

1915, 1927, 1931, 1932, 1951, 1958, 1961, 1974, 2017

- Group 7 Rugby League Runners-Up: 10

1920, 1926, 1938, 1939, 1946, 1947, 1950, 1954, 1956, 2019

- Ladies League Tag: 3

2016, 2019, 2020

- Group 7 Second Grade Premierships: 5

1925, 1946, 1947, 1969, 2022

- First Grade Minor Premierships: 6

1931, 1939, 1951, 1954, 1961, 2017

- Third Grade Premierships (Regan Cup): 7

1972, 1992, 1993, 1994, 1996, 1997, 2001

- U-18's Premierships:

None

- CRL Clayton Cup:

None
