= Ben Wellington (rugby league) =

Australian rugby league footballer

Personal information
- Full name: Ben Wellington
- Born: 9 January 1982 (age 44) Sydney, New South Wales, Australia
- Height: 182 cm (6 ft 0 in)
- Weight: 103 kg (16 st 3 lb)

Playing information
- Position: Centre
Club
Years	Team	Pld	T	G	FG	P
2003	Sydney Roosters	3	1	0	0	4

Ben Wellington (born 9 January 1982) is an Australian former rugby league footballer who played during the 2000s. He played his entire club football career for the Sydney Roosters. His position of choice was centre

== Playing career ==
In 2002, Wellington took part in the 2002 Jersey Flegg Grand Final in the Sydney Roosters victory over the St. George Illawarra Dragons. He made his first grade debut in his side's 36–28 win over the Cronulla-Sutherland Sharks at the Sydney Football Stadium in round 22 of the 2003 season, Wellington also scored his lone try in first grade his debut match. His final game of first grade came in his side's 46–16 win over the Manly Warringah Sea Eagles at the Sydney Football Stadium in round 24 of the 2003 season. Later that season, Wellington was left out of the side in the Sydney Roosters' 18-6 Grand Final loss to the Penrith Panthers. He was released by the Roosters at the end of the 2003 season and subsequently never played first grade rugby league again.
