= Nowra-Bomaderry Jets =

Australian rugby league club, based in Nowra, NSW

Club information
- Full name: Nowra-Bomaderry Jets Rugby League Football Club
- Short name: The Jets
- Colours: Blue; Gold; Black
- Founded: 2007; 19 years ago

Current details
- Ground: Nowra Showground, Nowra Bomaderry Sporting Complex, Bomaderry, New South Wales
- Coach: Ben Wellington (1st) / James Wellington (Res) / Peter Atfield (3rd Grade) / Ryan James & Steven Brandon (Under 18's) / Talia Atfield (WLT)
- Captain: Ben Wellington (1st, Res, 3rd Grade, Under 18's) / Talia Atfield (WLT)
- Competition: Group 7 Rugby League

Records
- Premierships: Women's League Tag (2012) 1st Grade (2014) Under 18's (2015)
- Runners-up: Women's League Tag (2011 & 2013)
- Minor premierships: Nil

The Nowra-Bomaderry Jets are an Australian rugby league football team based in Nowra, a coastal town of the South Coast region. The club is a part of Country Rugby League and previously competed in the South Coast first grade competition since 2008 when struggling clubs Nowra Warriors and Bomaderry Swamp Rats merged at the end of the 2007 competition. The Nowra Warriors and Bomaderry Swamp Rats still field teams in junior rugby league competitions.

== History ==
In November 2007, it was decided that the Nowra Warriors would merge with long-term rivals the Bomaderry Swamp Rats for the 2008 season. Both teams had been struggling with performance and sponsorship. Bomaderry had been out of first grade for six years prior to this decision. In the past, talks of merging had been quickly dismissed, but this time it was critical for the survival of both sides.

== Name, logo and colours ==
=== 2008–2010 ===
It was announced that the newly merged team would be called the Shoalhaven Jets and their colours would be blue, gold, and black. This is the natural result from the colours of each side, with Bomaderry formerly of blue and gold and Nowra of gold and black. Their logo is similar to that of NSWRL Premier League side Newtown Jets, with the name "Jets" inscribed over a large "S" (symbolising "Shoalhaven", in contrast to the large "N" of Newtown).

=== 2012 ===
After the side was able to recruit enough players and sponsors to field a team in the 2012 Group 7 Rugby League first grade competition after missing the 2011 season, the club re-branded themselves to "Nowra-Bomaderry" and established a new logo. The logo is based on the original logo, but utilises the club's colours of gold, blue and black. The year 2012 is also brandished on the logo.

=== 2014 ===
The Jets won the first grade competition in 2014. Led by Ben Wellington the Nowra-Bomaderry Jets completed a fairy tale finish by beating Warilla 30–20.

=== 2015 ===
After three years of no fielding an Under 18's team, the Jets won the Under 18's premiership in 2015. Coached by journeyman and the Jets 1st Grade prop Mick Blattner they completed another fairy tale for the club with many of the players still only 17.

Nowra-Bomaderry Jets logos

2008–2010

2012–present

== Honours ==
=== Team ===
- Group 7 Rugby League Premierships:

WLT Women's League Tag 2012
1st Grade 2014
Under 18's 2015

- Group 7 Rugby League Runners-Up: WLT Women's League Tag 2011 & 2013

- CRL Clayton Cup: None

=== Individual ===
- Group 7 Rugby League Kevin Walsh Memorial Trophy (Leading Point-scorer): 1

Leigh Ardler (2008)

- Group 7 Rugby League Tim Jones Memorial Trophy (Leading Try-scorer): 1

Leigh Ardler (2008)

- Group 7 Rugby League Michael Cronin Medal (Best & Fairest)

Samuel Stewart (2012)

- Group 7 Rugby League Roy Stewart Trophy (Rookie of the Year): 1

Ryan James (2014)
