= Group 7 Rugby League =

Australian rugby league competition

- Current season or competition: 2026 Group 7 Rugby League season
- Sport: Rugby league
- Formerly known as: South Coast Rugby League
- Instituted: 1914
- Inaugural season: 1914 (as South Coast Rugby League), 1955 (as Group 7 Rugby League)
- Number of teams: 9 First Grade, 15 Senior Clubs
- Country: Australia
- Premiers: Kiama Knights (2025)
- Most titles: Gerringong Lions (22 titles)
- Website: Group 7 South Coast Rugby League; Group 7 SRL (Facebook); Play Rugby League
- Broadcast partner: Bar TV Sports

South Coast Group 7 Rugby League (or Group 7 Rugby League for simplicity) is the divisional boundary drawn from the Southern Illawarra and South Coast regions (from the suburb of Warilla south to Ulladulla) of New South Wales, Australia and is governed by the NSWCRL. The main semi-professional competition comprises ten (10) teams from across the region. Group 7 Rugby League also administers reserve grade, third grade, and under-18s competitions, Ladies League Tag, as well as looking over many junior competitions.

== Clubs ==
The following twenty clubs compete in South Coast Group 7 competitions, with ten teams in the first-grade competition, seven clubs competing in lower grades and three clubs being junior standalone clubs. Due to the COVID-19 pandemic in Australia the commencement of 2020 season was postponed. Matches began on 25 July.

| Club | Traditional colours | Home ground | Years contested in first grade | First-grade seasons |
| Club | Traditional colours | Home ground | Years contested in first grade | Played | Premiers | Minor premiers | Runners-up |
| First Grade Clubs | | | | to 2023 |
| Albion Park-Oak Flats Eagles | | Centenary Field | 1919, (to Illawarra), 1940–49, 1951–53, 1955– | 81 | 13 | 10 | 6 |
| Berry-Shoalhaven Heads Magpies | | Berry Showground | 1914–44, 1946–81, 1983–2001, 2003–20, 2022– | 103 | 12 | 8 | 10 |
| Gerringong Lions | | Michael Cronin Oval | 1914–24, 1928–37, 1940–78, 1980– | 100 | 21 | 13 | 17 |
| Jamberoo Superoos | | Kevin Walsh Oval | 1914–22, 1926–27, 1931–67, 1971–79, 1987–88, 2009– | 70 | 9 | 6 | 10 |
| Kiama Knights | | Kiama Showground | 1914–23, 1925, 1930– | 101 | 12 | 14 | 13 |
| Milton-Ulladulla Bulldogs | | Bill Andriske Oval | (from Group 16) 1938–40, 1945–47, 1949–50, 1952–53, 1955–56, 1962–1991, 1994–2019, 2021– | 71 | 5 | 4 | 2 |
| Nowra-Bomaderry Jets | | Bomaderry Sports Complex | 2008–10, 2012– | 15 | 1 | 0 | 0 |
| Shellharbour Sharks | | Ron Costello Oval | 1931–36, 1939–93, 1995–2008, (to Illawarra), 2014– | 83 | 5 | 9 | 15 |
| Stingrays of Shellharbour | | Flinders Field | 2017– | 7 | 0 | 1 | 0 |
| Warilla-Lake South Gorillas | | Cec Glenholmes Oval | 1969– | 55 | 9 | 9 | 11 |
| Lower Grade Clubs in 2024 | | | | to 2023 |
| Culburra Dolphins | | Crookhaven Park | Nil (Third Grade 2014, 2016–2022, 2024) | 0 | 0 | 0 | 0 |
| Mt. Warrigal United Kooris | | Des King Oval | Nil (Third Grade 1980–81, 1995–2001, 2005–09, 2017–21, 2023–) | 0 | 0 | 0 | 0 |
| Robertson-Burrawang Spuddies | | Robertson Showground | Nil (Group 6 first grade in most years from 1914 to 1990s, Third grade 2018–) | 0 | 0 | 0 | 0 |
| Southern Highlands Storm | | Community Oval | Nil (from Group 6) (Third grade 2021–2023) | 0 | 0 | 0 | 0 |
| St. Georges Basin Dragons | | Francis Ryan Reserve | Nil (Reserve grade 2006–08, Third Grade 2023–) | 0 | 0 | 0 | 0 |
| Sussex Inlet Panthers | | Finkernagle Oval | Nil (Third Grade 1992–2006, 2008, 2016–2022) | 0 | 0 | 0 | 0 |
| Junior-only clubs | | | | to 2023 |
| Bomaderry Swamp Rats | | Bomaderry Sports Complex | 1926–27, 1945, 1955–56, 1958–88, 1990–2001, 2005 | 49 | 1 | 1 | 4 |
| Nowra Warriors | | Lyrebird Park | 1914–2007 | 98 | 10 | 13 | 11 |

Locations of the current South Coast Group 7 clubs.

Ten clubs, including Mt Warrigal and Milton-Ulladulla, also field Women's League Tag teams. This competition has been running since 2010, and has comprised two divisions since 2018.

Sussex Inlet and Wreck Bay had fielded third-grade teams in 2019, but have not entered a team in 2020. Kiama, who fielded a Ladies League Tag team from 2010 to 2019, have not done so in 2020.

=== Foundation clubs ===
Of the original eight teams that competed in the inaugural competition in 1914, only four teams remain playing in first grade. They are the Berry Magpies, Gerringong Lions, Jamberoo Superoos, and Kiama Knights. The Nowra Warriors were also a foundation club, but due to financial reasons were forced to merge with the Bomaderry Swamp Rats in 2007. The merger created the team Shoalhaven Jets, which was renamed Nowra-Bomaderry Jets in 2012.

=== New teams ===
There have been a few teams to expand into the Group 7 Rugby League First Grade Premiership. Through the 20s–30s Albion Park were founded, joined the Illawarra Rugby League and returned to Group 7 in 1933. The Shellharbour Sharks are known to have joined the league at this time. Milton-Ulladulla Bulldogs also joined from Group 16 Rugby League. The Warilla-Lake South Gorillas were first introduced into first grade during the 1970s and in 1978 the Batemans Bay Tigers were another team to move from Group 16.

== Former teams ==
| Club | Traditional colours | Note | Years contested in first grade | Seasons |
| Club | Traditional colours | Note | Years contested in first grade | Played | Premiers | Minor premiers | Runners-up |
| Foundation Clubs |
| Bombo | | Merged with Kiama in 1930 | 1914–15, 1923–24, 1929 (merged with Kiama) | 5 | 1 | 0 | 0 |
| Kangaroo Valley | | | 1914–21, 1925–28, 1937, 1955–57 | 14 | 0 | 0 | 1 |
| Naval College / Albatross | | | 1914, 1920, 1926–30, 1949, 1955–59, 1963–65, 1973–74 | 18 | 0 | 0 | 0 |
| Nowra Warriors | | Merged with Bomaderry to form the Jets | 1914–2007 (formed Jets) | 98 | 10 | 13 | 11 |
| Later Additions |
| Batemans Bay Tigers | | Re-Joined to Group 16 | 1978–2013 | 36 | 5 | 4 | 3 |
| St. Michaels / Nowra Saints | | | 1968–84 | 17 | 0 | 0 | 1 |
| Bomaderry Swamp Rats | | Merged with Nowra to form the Jets | 1926–27, 1945, 1955–56, 1958–88, 1990–2001, 2005 (formed Jets) | 49 | 1 | 1 | 4 |
| Bay and Basin United | | | 1996–99, 2009–10 | 6 | 0 | 0 | 0 |
| Port Kembla Blacks | | Illawarra RL (1914–2008, 2019) | 2013–17 | 4 | 0 | 0 | 0 |

Also the following lower-grade teams:

- Albion Park Outlaws (Third Grade 1998–2010, 2014–18, 2022)
- Crookhaven Magpies
- Port Kembla Blacks 2013 to 2017 (Formally Illawarra Rugby League competition 1914 to 2008)
- Pyree (22 seasons between 1920 and 1954)
- Wreck Bay United Bears (Contested in third grade in 1977–88, 1993–97, 1999–2005, 2014–18, 2021)

== Clubs timeline ==
The graph below shows the participation of all current and most former clubs. The club's highest grade in a particular year is displayed. The source is a compilation of competition tables, point scores and lists of participating teams. These have been taken from the Kiama Independent, Illawarra Mercury and other past newspapers on Trove and microfilm. The current South Coast Group 7 Official Historian has assisted with the provision of more recent tables as printed in association guidebooks and the South Coast Register. Further research may add seasons the juniors only clubs participated which are currently not shown.

== History ==
=== Formative years ===
Rugby league has been played in the South Coast region of New South Wales since 1913, with the first competition taking place between teams from the Shoalhaven district. In May 1914, with other rugby clubs from across the region also splitting from rugby union to join the new code, the South Coast Rugby League was formed. The first season of what is now known as the Group 7 competition began with eight teams competing. These teams included: Berry, Bombo, Gerringong, Jamberoo, Kiama, Kangaroo Valley, Naval College, and Nowra. The First round began on 30 May 1914, with Kiama defeating Gerringong 6–3, Naval College defeating Bombo 7–5, Jamberoo Superoos defeating Kangaroo Valley 3–0, and Nowra Warriors defeating Berry Magpies 3–0. The inaugural premiers were Gerringong, winning the final 11–10 at the Kiama Showground. As soon as the league began, they entered a two-year hiatus due to World War I. No competitions were held between 1916 and 1917. When the competition reformed in 1918, Gerringong again won the title. The Nowra Warriors were the next team to win the title in 1919.

=== 1920s ===
Gerringong went on to win the title a third time in 1920, with a 3–0 win over Jamberoo. During 1925–26, some of the northern teams moved into Illawarra Rugby League competition, including Gerringong, who took out the Illawarra Premiership in 1925. Jamberoo won the premiership in 1927. As a result, they were the first team to represent the South Coast in the first championship between South Coast and Illawarra Premiers. Jamberoo (South Coast) defeated Port Kembla (Illawarra) 15–11. In 1929, Bombo won their first (and only) premiership.

=== 1930s ===
After winning their first premiership in 1929, Bombo merged with Kiama in 1930. The new entity, Bombo-Kiama, took out the title in their first season. They followed this up with another in 1933. Albion Park became re-affiliated with South Coast Rugby League in 1933. Milton-Ulladulla joined the league in the 1930s from Group 16 Rugby League. Between 1935 and 1937, the Berry Magpies won the premiership three years consecutively. Junior aged competitions (U-17's, 18's, 19's) were first introduced in 1938. The Shellharbour Sharks won their first premiership in 1939.

=== 1940s ===
Again, the competition faced a hiatus, this time between 1942 and 1943, due to World War II. Albion Park won their maiden Premiership in 1944. Kiama (as a single entity) won the title in 1945. They went on to win a further three titles, becoming the first and only club to win four consecutive titles (1945–1948).

=== 1950s–1960s ===
For a second time, between 1952 and 1954, Berry record premiership wins three years consecutively. In 1955, the league was renamed Group 7 Rugby League. Shellharbour won the Premiership in 1962 after a 23-year drought. In 1967, Bomaderry record their first premiership win.

=== 1970s–1980s ===
In the 1970s, an expansion occurred when Warilla entered the first grade competition in 1970. They go on to win their first premiership in 1978. The Batemans Bay Tigers win their first premiership in 1979, after joining one year earlier in 1978 from Group 16. In 1980, the league was re-branded as South Coast Group Seven. Milton-Ulladulla record their first premiership win in 1987.

=== Modern times ===
A hat-trick of premierships is again recorded, this time by the Albion Park-Oak Flats Eagles between 1998 and 2000.

Source: Group 7 Rugby League History

== Premierships ==
=== First-grade premiers ===
| Season | Grand Final Information | | | | Minor Premiers | Club Championship |
| Season | Premiers | Score | Runners-up | Report | Minor Premiers | Club Championship |
|---|---|---|---|---|---|---|
| 1913 | Nowra Warriors | | | | Nowra Warriors |
| 1914 | Gerringong Lions | 11–10 | Nowra Warriors | | Gerringong Lions |
| 1915 | Jamberoo Superoos | WFLF | Gerringong Lions |
| No competition held between 1916 and 1917 |
| 1918 | Gerringong Lions | 12–3 | Kiama Knights |
| 1919 | Nowra Warriors | 7–7 | Kiama Knights |
| 1919 | Nowra Warriors | 13–9 | Kiama Knights |
| 1920 | Gerringong Lions | 3–0 | Jamberoo Superoos |
| 1921 | Gerringong Lions | 8–7 | Berry-Shoalhaven Heads Magpies | | Gerringong Lions |
| 1922 | Gerringong Lions | 11–0 | Berry-Shoalhaven Heads Magpies |
| 1923 | Berry-Shoalhaven Heads Magpies | 6–5 | Gerringong Lions | | Berry-Shoalhaven Heads Magpies |
| 1924 | Gerringong Lions | 10–0 | Berry-Shoalhaven Heads Magpies |
| 1925 | Kiama Knights | 8–5 | Kangaroo Valley |
| 1926 | Berry-Shoalhaven Heads Magpies | 13–10 | Jamberoo Superoos |
| 1927 | Jamberoo Superoos | 14–0 | Berry-Shoalhaven Heads Magpies | | Berry-Shoalhaven Heads Magpies |
| 1928 | Berry-Shoalhaven Heads Magpies | 5–2 | Gerringong Lions |
| 1929 | Bombo | 12–7 | Gerringong Lions | | Gerringong Lions |
| 1930 | Kiama Knights | 3–3 | Nowra Warriors | | Kiama Knights |
| 1930 | Kiama Knights | 6–4 | Nowra Warriors | | Kiama Knights |
| 1931 | Jamberoo Superoos | 10–0 | Shellharbour Sharks | | Jamberoo Superoos |
| 1932 | Jamberoo Superoos | 7–7 | Shellharbour Sharks | | Shellharbour Sharks |
| 1932 | Jamberoo Superoos | 21–0 | Shellharbour Sharks | | Shellharbour Sharks |
| 1933 | Kiama Knights | 7–4 | Nowra Warriors | | Kiama Knights |
| 1934 | Nowra Warriors | 16–10 | Kiama Knights | | Kiama Knights |
| 1935 | Berry-Shoalhaven Heads Magpies | 11–2 | Kiama Knights | | Kiama Knights |
| 1936 | Berry-Shoalhaven Heads Magpies | 22–4 | Gerringong Lions | | Berry-Shoalhaven Heads Magpies |
| 1937 | Berry-Shoalhaven Heads Magpies | 15–2 | Nowra Warriors | | Berry-Shoalhaven Heads Magpies |
| 1938 | Nowra Warriors | 12–5 | Jamberoo Superoos | | Nowra Warriors |
| 1939 | Shellharbour Sharks | 4–2 | Jamberoo Superoos | | Jamberoo Superoos |
| 1940 | Gerringong Lions | 6–2 | Kiama Knights | | Gerringong Lions |
| 1941 | Berry-Shoalhaven Heads Magpies | 10–7 | Kiama Knights | | Berry-Shoalhaven Heads Magpies |
| No competition held between 1942 and 1943 |
| 1944 | Albion Park-Oak Flats Eagles | 4–3 | Nowra Warriors |
| 1945 | Kiama Knights | 5–0 | Nowra Warriors | | Kiama Knights |
| 1946 | Kiama Knights | 3–0 | Jamberoo Superoos | | Kiama Knights |
| 1947 | Kiama Knights | 19–5 | Jamberoo Superoos | | Kiama Knights |
| 1948 | Kiama Knights | 5–5 | Berry-Shoalhaven Heads Magpies | | Kiama Knights |
| 1948 | Kiama Knights | 10–6 | Berry-Shoalhaven Heads Magpies | | Kiama Knights |
| 1949 | Albion Park-Oak Flats Eagles | 2–0 | Gerringong Lions | | Gerringong Lions |
| 1950 | Kiama Knights | 5–5 | Jamberoo Superoos | | Kiama Knights |
| 1950 | Kiama Knights | 2–0 | Jamberoo Superoos | | Kiama Knights |
| 1951 | Jamberoo Superoos | 15–5 | Kiama Knights | | Jamberoo Superoos |
| 1952 | Berry-Shoalhaven Heads Magpies | 8–0 | Gerringong Lions | | Berry-Shoalhaven Heads Magpies |
| 1953 | Berry-Shoalhaven Heads Magpies | 12–2 | Kiama Knights | | Berry-Shoalhaven Heads Magpies |
| 1954 | Berry-Shoalhaven Heads Magpies | 13–0 | Jamberoo Superoos | | Jamberoo Superoos |
| 1955 | Nowra Warriors | 13–9 | Shellharbour Sharks | | Nowra Warriors |
| 1956 | Gerringong Lions | 6–5 | Jamberoo Superoos | | Gerringong Lions |
| 1957 | Nowra Warriors | 19–10 | Shellharbour Sharks | | Nowra Warriors |
| 1958 | Jamberoo Superoos | 18–8 | Berry-Shoalhaven Heads Magpies | | Nowra Warriors |
| 1959 | Nowra Warriors | 8–6 | Bomaderry Swamp Rats | | Nowra Warriors |
| 1960 | Gerringong Lions | 7–3 | Nowra Warriors | | Nowra Warriors |
| 1961 | Jamberoo Superoos | 7–2 | Nowra Warriors | | Jamberoo Superoos |
| 1962 | Shellharbour Sharks | 13–6 | Albion Park-Oak Flats Eagles | | Shellharbour Sharks |
| 1963 | Albion Park-Oak Flats Eagles | 3–0 | Berry-Shoalhaven Heads Magpies | | Albion Park-Oak Flats Eagles |
| 1964 | Albion Park-Oak Flats Eagles | 6–5 | Berry-Shoalhaven Heads Magpies | | Shellharbour Sharks |
| 1965 | Gerringong Lions | 14–9 | Albion Park-Oak Flats Eagles | | Nowra Warriors |
| 1966 | Berry-Shoalhaven Heads Magpies | 4–0 | Shellharbour Sharks | | Shellharbour Sharks |
| 1967 | Berry-Shoalhaven Heads Magpies | 15–7 | Nowra Warriors | | Nowra Warriors |
| 1968 | Gerringong Lions | 15–9 | Shellharbour Sharks | | Gerringong Lions |
| 1969 | Kiama Knights | 2–2 | Bomaderry Swamp Rats | | Kiama Knights |
| 1969 | Kiama Knights | 14–2 | Bomaderry Swamp Rats | | Kiama Knights |
| 1970 | Gerringong Lions | 17–15 | Shellharbour Sharks | | Shellharbour Sharks |
| 1971 | Shellharbour Sharks | 8–0 | Gerringong Lions | | Gerringong Lions |
| 1972 | Gerringong Lions | 13–7 | Shellharbour Sharks | | Gerringong Lions |
| 1973 | Shellharbour Sharks | 36–7 | Gerringong Lions | | Bomaderry Swamp Rats |
| 1974 | Jamberoo Superoos | 13–5 | Albion Park-Oak Flats Eagles | | Nowra Warriors |
| 1975 | Albion Park-Oak Flats Eagles | 19–8 | Gerringong Lions | | Gerringong Lions |
| 1976 | Bomaderry Swamp Rats | 14–12 | Albion Park-Oak Flats Eagles | | Albion Park-Oak Flats Eagles |
| 1977 | Nowra Warriors | 21–7 | Kiama Knights | | Milton-Ulladulla Bulldogs |
| 1978 | Warilla-Lake South Gorillas | 10–2 | Bomaderry Swamp Rats | | Nowra Warriors |
| 1979 | Batemans Bay Tigers | 10–0 | Milton-Ulladulla Bulldogs | | Batemans Bay Tigers |
| 1980 | Warilla-Lake South Gorillas | 14–10 | Shellharbour Sharks | | Warilla-Lake South Gorillas |
| 1981 | Nowra Warriors | 20–3 | Warilla-Lake South Gorillas | | Nowra Warriors |
| 1982 | Warilla-Lake South Gorillas | 27–7 | Nowra Saints | | Warilla-Lake South Gorillas |
| 1983 | Kiama Knights | 38–6 | Shellharbour Sharks | | Kiama Knights |
| 1984 | Warilla-Lake South Gorillas | 30–6 | Kiama Knights | | Kiama Knights |
| 1985 | Kiama Knights | 22–18 | Nowra Warriors | | Kiama Knights |
| 1986 | Batemans Bay Tigers | 10–8 | Warilla-Lake South Gorillas | | Batemans Bay Tigers |
| 1987 | Milton-Ulladulla Bulldogs | 13–12 | Gerringong Lions | | Gerringong Lions |
| 1988 | Batemans Bay Tigers | 19–12 | Gerringong Lions | | Milton-Ulladulla Bulldogs |
| 1989 | Milton-Ulladulla Bulldogs | 8–4 | Gerringong Lions | | Milton-Ulladulla Bulldogs |
| 1990 | Gerringong Lions | 19–16 | Kiama Knights | | Berry-Shoalhaven Heads Magpies |
| 1991 | Warilla-Lake South Gorillas | 22–1 | Kiama Knights | | Kiama Knights |
| 1992 | Batemans Bay Tigers | 26–6 | Warilla-Lake South Gorillas | | Warilla-Lake South Gorillas |
| 1993 | Nowra Warriors | 16–12 | Bomaderry Swamp Rats | | Batemans Bay Tigers |
| 1994 | Gerringong Lions | 9–6 | Warilla-Lake South Gorillas | | Warilla-Lake South Gorillas |
| 1995 | Warilla-Lake South Gorillas | 12–10 | Nowra Warriors | | Nowra Warriors |
| 1996 | Nowra Warriors | 42–6 | Shellharbour Sharks | | Nowra Warriors |
| 1997 | Warilla-Lake South Gorillas | 18–16 | Albion Park-Oak Flats Eagles | | Warilla-Lake South Gorillas |
| 1998 | Albion Park-Oak Flats Eagles | 11–4 | Warilla-Lake South Gorillas | | Warilla-Lake South Gorillas |
| 1999 | Albion Park-Oak Flats Eagles | 30–16 | Batemans Bay Tigers | | Albion Park-Oak Flats Eagles |
| 2000 | Albion Park-Oak Flats Eagles | 31–18 | Batemans Bay Tigers | | Albion Park-Oak Flats Eagles |
| 2001 | Shellharbour Sharks | 22–20 | Batemans Bay Tigers | | Shellharbour Sharks |
| 2002 | Batemans Bay Tigers | 54–10 | Milton-Ulladulla Bulldogs | | Batemans Bay Tigers |
| 2003 | Albion Park-Oak Flats Eagles | 14–10 | Gerringong Lions | | Albion Park-Oak Flats Eagles |
| 2004 | Milton-Ulladulla Bulldogs | 50–12 | Berry-Shoalhaven Heads Magpies | | Milton-Ulladulla Bulldogs |
| 2005 | Milton-Ulladulla Bulldogs | 34–22 | Albion Park-Oak Flats Eagles | | Albion Park-Oak Flats Eagles |
| 2006 | Albion Park-Oak Flats Eagles | 30–0 | Shellharbour Sharks | | Albion Park-Oak Flats Eagles |
| 2007 | Albion Park-Oak Flats Eagles | 44–10 | Berry-Shoalhaven Heads Magpies | | Albion Park-Oak Flats Eagles |
| 2008 | Milton-Ulladulla Bulldogs | 36–24 | Shellharbour Sharks | | Shellharbour Sharks |
| 2009 | Albion Park-Oak Flats Eagles | 25–22 | Warilla-Lake South Gorillas | | Warilla-Lake South Gorillas | Warilla-Lake South Gorillas |
| 2010 | Gerringong Lions | 21–20 | Warilla-Lake South Gorillas | | Albion Park-Oak Flats Eagles | Gerringong Lions |
| 2011 | Warilla-Lake South Gorillas | 36–6 | Gerringong Lions | | Warilla-Lake South Gorillas | Berry-Shoalhaven Heads Magpies |
| 2012 | Albion Park-Oak Flats Eagles | 16–14 | Gerringong Lions | | Albion Park-Oak Flats Eagles | Gerringong Lions |
| 2013 | Gerringong Lions | 16–14 | Warilla-Lake South Gorillas | | Gerringong Lions | Warilla-Lake South Gorillas |
| 2014 | Nowra-Bomaderry Jets | 30–20 | Warilla-Lake South Gorillas | | Warilla-Lake South Gorillas | Shellharbour Sharks |
| 2015 | Gerringong Lions | 26–22 | Shellharbour Sharks | | Shellharbour Sharks | Shellharbour Sharks |
| 2016 | Gerringong Lions | 10–0 | Warilla-Lake South Gorillas | | Gerringong Lions | Gerringong Lions |
| 2017 | Jamberoo Superoos | 18–14 | Kiama Knights | | Jamberoo Superoos | Kiama Knights |
| 2018 | Shellharbour Sharks | 32–22 | Kiama Knights | | Shellharbour Sharks | Kiama Knights |
| 2019 | Kiama Knights | 28–14 | Jamberoo Superoos | | Shellharbour Sharks | Kiama Knights |
| 2020 | Gerringong Lions | 20–6 | Warilla-Lake South Gorillas | | Gerringong Lions | Gerringong Lions |
| 2021 | 2021 Season Cancelled After Round 13 |
| 2022 | Warilla-Lake South Gorillas | 16–14 | Gerringong Lions | | Gerringong Lions | Gerringong Lions |
| 2023 | Gerringong Lions | 12–10 | Shellharbour Sharks | | Stingrays of Shellharbour | Stingrays of Shellharbour |
| 2024 | Gerringong Lions | 28–10 | Shellharbour Sharks | | Gerringong Lions | Shellharbour Sharks |
| 2025 | Kiama Knights | 16–4 | Shellharbour Sharks | | Shellharbour Sharks | Stingrays of Shellharbour |
| 2026 | Kiama Knights | 40–10 | Albion Park-Oak Flats Eagles | | Albion Park-Oak Flats Eagles |

=== Total premierships won ===
- **Bold** denotes clubs which are still active in the first-grade competition.

==== First grade ====
| Team | Titles | Years |
|---|---|---|
| **Gerringong Lions** | 22 | 1914, 1918, 1920, 1921, 1922, 1924, 1940, 1956, 1960, 1965, 1968, 1970, 1972, 1990, 1994, 2010, 2013, 2015, 2016, 2020, 2023, 2024 |
| **Kiama Knights** | 13 | 1925, 1930, 1933, 1945, 1946, 1947, 1948, 1950, 1969, 1983, 1985, 2019, **2025** |
| **Albion Park-Oak Flats Eagles** | 13 | 1944, 1949, 1963, 1964, 1975, 1998, 1999, 2000, 2003, 2006, 2007, 2009, 2012 |
| **Berry-Shoalhaven Heads Magpies** | 12 | 1923, 1926, 1928, 1935, 1936, 1937, 1941, 1952, 1953, 1954, 1966, 1967 |
| Nowra Warriors | 11 | 1913, 1919, 1934, 1938, 1955, 1957, 1959, 1977, 1981, 1993, 1996 |
| Warilla-Lake South Gorillas | 9 | 1978, 1980, 1982, 1984,1991, 1995, 1997, 2011, 2022 |
| **Jamberoo Superoos** | 9 | 1915, 1927, 1931, 1932, 1951, 1958, 1961, 1974, 2017 |
| **Shellharbour Sharks** | 6 | 1939, 1962, 1971, 1973, 2001, 2018 |
| **Milton-Ulladulla Bulldogs** | 5 | 1987, 1989, 2004, 2005, 2008 |
| Batemans Bay Tigers | 5 | 1979, 1986, 1988, 1992, 2002 |
| **Nowra-Bomaderry Jets** | 1 | 2014 |
| Bomaderry Swamp Rats | 1 | 1976 |
| Bombo | 1 | 1929 |

==== Reserve grade ====
| Team | Titles | Years |
|---|---|---|
| **Shellharbour Sharks** | 17 | 1962, 1963, 1964, 1965, 1971, 1975, 1983, 1990, 2000, 2001, 2003, 2004, 2005, 2006, 2015, 2016 |
| **Kiama Knights** | 15 | 1919, 1921, 1923, 1929, 1930, 1931, 1932, 1936, 1950, 1951, 1982, 2012, 2014, 2017, 2018 |
| Nowra Warriors | 13 | 1927, 1930, 1933, 1934, 1937, 1952, 1954, 1967, 1974, 1978, 1979, 1981, 1985 |
| **Albion Park-Oak Flats Eagles** | 8 | 1938*, 1966, 1976, 1997, 1998, 1999, 2008, 2019 |
| **Warilla-Lake South Gorillas** | 8 | 1987, 1988, 1991, 1992, 1994, 2007, 2010, 2013 |
| **Jamberoo Superoos** | 6 | 1925, 1938*, 1946, 1947, 1969, 2022 |
| **Gerringong Lions** | 5 | 1995, 2002, 2011, 2023, 2024 |
| Bomaderry Swamp Rats | 4 | 1920, 1968, 1977, 1996 |
| Batemans Bay Tigers | 3 | 1984, 1986, 1993 |
| **Milton-Ulladulla Bulldogs** | 3 | 1948, 1980, 1989 |
| Albatross | 3 | 1957, 1958, 1961 |
| Kangaroo Valley | 2 | 1922, 1953 |
| **Stingrays of Shellharbour** | 1 | **2025** |
| **Nowra-Bomaderry Jets** | 1 | 2020 |
| **Berry-Shoalhaven Heads Magpies** | 1 | 2009 |
| Jervis Bay | 1 | 1960 |
| Roseby Park | 1 | 1949 |
| Pyree | 1 | 1935 |
| Bombo | 1 | 1924 |

==== Regan Cup (Third grade) ====
| Team | Titles | Years |
|---|---|---|
| **Jamberoo Superoos** | 7 | 1972, 1992, 1993, 1994, 1996, 1997, 2001 |
| Albion Park-Oak Flats Eagles | 6 | 1974, 1981, 1985, 1991, 2002, 2003 |
| **Crookhaven Magpies** | 5 | 1984, 1988, 1989, 1990, 1998 |
| **Mt. Warrigal United Kooris** | 4 | 2007, 2017, 2018, 2019 |
| Sussex Inlet Panthers | 3 | 1999, 2000, 2022 |
| **Shellharbour Sharks** | 3 | 1971, 1977, 2015 |
| Greenwell Point | 3 | 2004, 2008, 2009 |
| Warilla-Lake South Gorillas | 3 | 1975, 1976, 1983 |
| Stingrays of Shellharbour | 2 | 2014, 2023 |
| Albion Park Outlaws | 2 | 2005, 2006 |
| Wreck Bay United Bears | 2 | 1980, 1995 |
| Albatross | 2 | 1978, 1986 |
| Milton-Ulladulla Bulldogs | 2 | 1969, 1982 |
| **St Georges Basin Dragons** | 1 | **2025** |
| Nowra-Bomaderry Jets | 1 | 2024 |
| **Robertson-Burrawang Spuddies** | 1 | 2020 |
| Culburra Dolphins | 1 | 2016 |
| Shoalhaven All Blacks | 1 | 1987 |
| Nowra Warriors | 1 | 1979 |
| Gerringong Lions | 1 | 1973 |
| Wandandian | 1 | 1970 |
| Berry-Shoalhaven Heads Magpies | 1 | 1922 |

==== Under 18s ====
| Team | Titles | Years |
|---|---|---|
| **Kiama Knights** | 14 | 1945, 1946, 1948, 1950, 1952, 1953, 1956, 1958, 1982, 1992, 2002, 2004, 2013, 2016 |
| **Warilla-Lake South Gorillas** | 12 | 1968, 1970, 1974, 1986, 1988, 1989, 1991, 1998, 2001, 2012, 2019, 2023 |
| Shellharbour Sharks | 11 | 1944, 1957, 1959, 1960, 1961, 1963, 1964, 2003, 2007, 2014, 2020 |
| Nowra Warriors | 10 | 1955, 1962, 1967, 1971, 1979, 1980, 1985, 1987, 1993, 1995 |
| **Albion Park-Oak Flats Eagles** | 9 | 1954, 1965, 1966, 1978, 1984, 1990, 1999, 2018, 2024 |
| **Gerringong Lions** | 7 | 1938, 1940, 1951, 1994, 2000, 2010, 2022 |
| **Berry-Shoalhaven Heads Magpies** | 6 | 1947, 1949, 1972, 1973, 1983, **2025** |
| **Milton-Ulladulla Bulldogs** | 6 | 2005, 2006, 2008, 2011, 2017 |
| Bomaderry Swamp Rats | 4 | 1975, 1976, 1977, 1981 |
| Bay and Basin United | 2 | 1996, 1997 |
| **Nowra-Bomaderry Jets** | 1 | 2015 |
| Culburra Dolphins | 1 | 2009 |
| Pyree | 1 | 1939 |

==== Open Women's Tackle ====
| Team | Titles | Years |
|---|---|---|
| **Milton-Ulladulla Bulldogs** | 2 | 2023, **2024** |

==== Ladies League Tag Division 1 ====
| Team | Titles | Years |
|---|---|---|
| Kiama Knights | 5 | 2011, 2013, 2015, 2017, 2018 |
| Jamberoo Superoos | 4 | 2016, 2019, 2020, 2023 |
| Milton-Ulladulla Bulldogs | 3 | 2014, 2024, **2025** |
| Stingrays of Shellharbour | 1 | 2022 |
| Nowra-Bomaderry Jets | 1 | 2012 |
| Warilla-Lake South Gorillas | 1 | 2010 |

==== Ladies League Tag Division 2 ====
| Team | Titles | Years |
|---|---|---|
| **Shellharbour Sharks** | 2 | 2019, 2022 |
| Albion Park-Oak Flats Eagles | 2 | 2018, 2020 |
| **Milton-Ulladulla Bulldogs** | 1 | **2025** |
| **Jamberoo Superoos** | 1 | 2024 |
| **Warilla-Lake South Gorillas** | 1 | 2023 |

==== Regan Cup Ladies League Tag ====
| Team | Titles | Years |
|---|---|---|
| **Crookhaven Magpies** | 1 | **2025** |

==== Club Championship ====
| Team | Titles | Years |
|---|---|---|
| Gerringong Lions | 5 | 2010, 2012, 2016, 2020, 2022 |
| Shellharbour Sharks | 3 | 2014, 2015, 2024 |
| Kiama Knights | 3 | 2017, 2018, 2019 |
| Stingrays of Shellharbour | 2 | 2023, **2025** |
| Warilla-Lake South Gorillas | 2 | 2009, 2013 |
| Berry-Shoalhaven Heads Magpies | 1 | 2011 |

== See also ==
- Rugby League Competitions in Australia
