= Kiama Knights =

Australian rugby league club, based in Kiama, NSW

Club information
- Full name: Kiama Rugby League Football Club
- Nickname: Albion park oak flats fathers
- Short name: The Knights
- Colours: Primary: Red; Black; Secondary: White
- Founded: 1914; 112 years ago

Current details
- Ground: Kiama Showground , Kiama ’The Castle’
- Chairman: Greg Norris
- Coach: Matt O’Brien & Steve Ross
- Captain: Tom Angel
- Competition: Group 7 Rugby League
- 2026: Premiers

Records
- Premierships: 14 (1925, 1930, 1933, 1945, 1946, 1947, 1948, 1950, 1969, 1983, 1985, 2019, 2025, 2026)
- Runners-up: 14 (1918, 1919, 1934, 1935, 1940, 1941, 1951, 1953, 1977, 1984, 1990, 1991, 2017, 2018)
- Minor premierships: 14 (1930, 1933, 1934, 1935, 1945, 1946, 1947, 1948, 1950, 1969, 1983, 1984, 1985, 1991)

The Kiama Knights are an Australian rugby league football team based in Kiama, a coastal town of the Illawarra and South Coast regions. The club was formed in 1914 as one of the founding members of South Coast Rugby League, and continue to participate in this league's local competition.

== History ==
On 30 May 1914, Kiama kicked off the inaugural South Coast Rugby League competition with a 6–3 home win at Kiama Showground against nearest neighbour and soon to be biggest rivals, Gerringong. Gerringong, however, would go on to take out the premiership final with an 11–10 victory at the Kiama Showground, a match that would charge a sixpence to attend. Kiama won their first premiership in August 1925, defeating Kangaroo Valley in a final. In 1930, Kiama merged with Bombo and they won the title that year. As Bombo-Kiama, the club won the title again in 1933. In 1940 the team would be only referred to by Kiama and this team won the first of four consecutive titles in 1945, an achievement which has not been surpassed in the league to this day. Kiama has won 12 Group 7 premierships overall, behind Gerringong (16) and equal with Berry and Albion Park (12).

=== Name and emblem ===
The Kiama Knights were not always known by this moniker. In 1918, when the competition reformed after World War I, the club was known as the Dinkums, before switching to Warriors the following year. In 1923 the club was known as the Starlights. The Kiama Knights emblem is adopted from that of the Newcastle Knights.

=== Colours ===
The colours used by the Kiama side are red, black and white, following a similar strip to that of the NSWRL Sydney team, the North Sydney Bears.

=== Home ground ===
The Kiama Knights have played out of the Kiama Showground since their inception in 1914. At one stage this ground was called "Church Point", due to its geographical location. The showground has undergone a recent development to its grandstand and pavilion in 2009.

== Notable past players ==
- Shaun Timmins (1994–06 Illawarra Steelers & St. George Illawarra Dragons)
- Brett Morris (2006– St. George Illawarra Dragons, Canterbury Bulldogs, Sydney Roosters)
- Josh Morris (2007– St. George Illawarra Dragons, Canterbury Bulldogs, Cronulla Sharks, Sydney Roosters)
- Mitch Rein (2011– St. George Illawarra Dragons, Penrith Panthers, Gold Coast Titans)

== Honours ==
=== Team ===
- Group 7 Rugby League Premierships: 12

1925, 1930, 1933, 1945, 1946, 1947, 1948, 1950, 1969, 1983, 1985, 2019

- Group 7 Rugby League Runners-Up: 14

1918, 1919, 1934, 1935, 1940, 1941, 1951, 1953, 1977, 1984, 1990, 1991, 2017, 2018

- Group 7 Second Grade Premierships: 12

1919, 1921, 1923, 1929, 1936, 1950, 1951, 1982, 2012, 2014, 2017, 2018

- First Grade Minor Premierships: 14

1930, 1933, 1934, 1935, 1945, 1946, 1947, 1948, 1950, 1969, 1983, 1984, 1985, 1991

- Group 7 U-18's Premierships: 8

1945, 1946, 1982, 1992, 2002, 2004, 2013, 2016

- Women's League Tag: 5

2011, 2013, 2015, 2017, 2018

- Leo O'Dwyer Cups: 4

1948, 1949, 1950, 1985

=== Individual ===
- Michael Cronin Medal: 5

Peter Gentle (1991), Andrew Jackson (1998), Daniel Gunning (2002 & 2006), Cameron Vazzoler (2018) Kieran Poole (2020)

- Group 7 Rugby League Player of the Year: 4

Peter French (1983), Graham Murtagh (1995), Mark Duncan (2004), Daniel Gunning (2006)

- Group 7 Rugby League Rookie of the Year: 2

Graham Murtagh (1983), Mitch Rein (2008) Kye Andrews (2025)

- Group 7 Rugby League Leading Point-scorer: 1

Tony Fitler (1984)

- Group 7 Rugby League Leading Try-scorer: 4

Peter Gentle (1983), Ian Howcroft (1986), Robert Baillie (1989), Jeremy Alger (2008)

- Group 7 Under-21s Player of the Year: 2

Scott Morris (2001), John Elliott (2006)

- Group 7 Under-18s Player of the Year: 3

Dean Antony (1992), Paul Ross (2003), James Gilmore (2009)

- Kevin Walsh Scholarship: 8

Joe Murphy (1982), Dean Smith (1985), John Watkins & Scott England (1988), Matt Duggan (1990), Samuel Burke (1999), Josh Elliott (2001), Mitch Rein (2005), Eadie Payne (2025)
