= 2021 Group 7 Rugby League season =

The 2021 Group 7 Rugby League season was the 109th season of rugby league in the New South Wales country region of Group 7. On 16 August 2021, it was announced by the New South Wales Rugby League governing body that all competitions in Group 7 would be abandoned due to the ongoing issues involving COVID-19 in the area and surrounding regions.

== 1st Grade ==
2021 Group 7 Rugby League 1st Grade
- Duration: 10 April – 19 September
- Teams: 9
- Matches played: 24
- Points scored: 1,174
- Broadcast partners: Bar TV Sports
- Top points scorer(s): Blake Jones (22 points) (as of Rd. 2)
- Top try-scorer: Mark Asquith (4 tries) (as of Rd. 2)

=== Teams ===
Colours	Club	Season	Home ground(s)	Head coach(s)	2020 position
	Albion Park-Oak Flats Eagles	79th season	Centenary Field	Ian Jones; Steven Johnson	8th
	Gerringong Lions	98th season	Michael Cronin Oval	Scott Stewart	1st (Premiers)
	Jamberoo Superoos	68th season	Kevin Walsh Oval	Jono Dallas (c/c)	2nd
	Kiama Knights	99th season	Kiama Showground	Matt Laird	4th
	Milton-Ulladulla Bulldogs	70th season	Bill Andriske Oval	Peter Lefley (c/c)	N/A
	Nowra-Bomaderry Jets	13th season	Shoalhaven Rugby Park	Ben Wellington	5th
	Shellharbour Sharks	81st season	Ron Costello Oval	Abed Atallah	6th
	Stingrays of Shellharbour	5th season	Flinders Field	Greg Reh; Ben Reh	7th
	Warilla-Lake South Gorillas	53rd season	Cec Glenholmes Oval	Troy Grant; Neil Familo	3rd (runner-ups)

=== Ladder ===
Pos	Team	Pld	W	D	L	B	PF	PA	PD	Pts
1	Gerringong Lions	10	7	2	1	2	326	96	+230	20
2	Jamberoo Superoos	10	7	3	0	1	264	48	+216	19
3	Albion Park-Oak Flats Eagles	11	6	3	2	1	230	162	+68	17
4	Warilla-Lake South Gorillas	11	5	2	4	1	230	234	-4	14
5	Kiama Knights	11	5	2	4	1	190	220	-30	14
6	Shellharbour Sharks	11	2	4	5	1	190	206	-16	10
7	Nowra-Bomaderry Jets	9	2	2	5	2	128	220	-92	10
8	Stingrays of Shellharbour	11	2	3	6	1	192	228	-36	9
9	Milton-Ulladulla Bulldogs	10	0	1	9	2	66	404	-338	5

=== Season results ===
==== Round 1 ====
Home	Score	Away	Match information		
Home	Score	Away	Date and time	Venue	Referee
Albion Park-Oak Flats Eagles	42 – 30	Stingrays of Shellharbour	Saturday, 10 April, 18:30	Centenary Field	W. Drury
Kiama Knights	8 – 42	Jamberoo Superoos	Sunday, 11 April, 15:00	Kiama Showground	R. Micallef
Nowra-Bomaderry Jets	20 – 10	Milton-Ulladulla Bulldogs	Sunday, 11 April, 15:00	Shoalhaven Rugby Park	T. Jordan
Shellharbour Sharks	22 – 32	Warilla-Lake South Gorillas	Sunday, 11 April, 15:00	Ron Costello Oval	B. Warren
Bye: Gerringong Lions

==== Round 2 ====
Home	Score	Away	Match information		
Home	Score	Away	Date and time	Venue	Referee
Jamberoo Superoos	32 – 6	Albion Park-Oak Flats Eagles	Saturday, 17 April, 15:00	Kevin Walsh Oval	B. Warren
Warilla-Lake South Gorillas	20 – 28	Gerringong Lions	Sunday, 18 April, 15:00	Cec Glenholmes Oval	R. Micallef
Kiama Knights	32 – 14	Milton-Ulladulla Bulldogs	Sunday, 18 April, 15:00	Kiama Showground	W. Drury
Stingrays of Shellharbour	22 – 22	Shellharbour Sharks	Sunday, 18 April, 15:30	Flinders Field	T. Jordan
Bye: Nowra-Bomaderry Jets

==== Round 3 ====
Home	Score	Away	Match information		
Home	Score	Away	Date and time	Venue	Referee
Gerringong Lions	54 – 0	Nowra-Bomaderry Jets	Saturday, 1 May, 15:00	Michael Cronin Oval	B. Warren
Kiama Knights	36 – 12	Warilla-Lake South Gorillas	Sunday, 2 May, 15:00	Kiama Showground	T. Jordan
Albion Park-Oak Flats Eagles	26 – 20	Shellharbour Sharks	Sunday, 2 May, 15:00	Centenary Field	R. Micallef
Stingrays of Shellharbour	6 – 32	Jamberoo Superoos	Sunday, 2 May, 15:30	Flinders Field	W. Drury
Bye: Milton-Ulladulla Bulldogs

==== Round 4 ====
Home	Score	Away	Match information		
Home	Score	Away	Date and time	Venue	Referee
Gerringong Lions	P – P	Jamberoo Superoos	TBC	Michael Cronin Oval	
Shellharbour Sharks	P – P	Kiama Knights	TBC	Ron Costello Oval	
Warilla-Lake South Gorillas	P – P	Milton-Ulladulla Bulldogs	TBC	Cec Glenholmes Oval	
Nowra-Bomaderry Jets	P – P	Albion Park-Oak Flats Eagles	TBC	Shoalhaven Rugby Park	
Bye: Stingrays of Shellharbour

- All fixtures for Round 4 were postponed because of ground closures due to rainfall.

==== Round 5 ====
Home	Score	Away	Match information		
Home	Score	Away	Date and time	Venue	Referee
Albion Park-Oak Flats Eagles	28 – 26	Gerringong Lions	Saturday, 15 May, 18:30	Centenary Field	T. Jordan
Kiama Knights	32 – 18	Nowra-Bomaderry Jets	Sunday, 16 May, 15:00	Kiama Showground	R. Micallef
Milton-Ulladulla Bulldogs	10 – 52	Shellharbour Sharks	Sunday, 16 May, 15:00	Bill Andriske Oval	W. Drury
Stingrays of Shellharbour	10 – 18	Warilla-Lake South Gorillas	Sunday, 16 May, 15:30	Flinders Field	B. Warren
Bye: Jamberoo Superoos

==== Round 6 ====
Home	Score	Away	Match information		
Home	Score	Away	Date and time	Venue	Referee
Gerringong Lions	28 – 12	Shellharbour Sharks	Saturday, 22 May, 15:00	Michael Cronin Oval	T. Jordan
Jamberoo Superoos	64 – 0	Milton-Ulladulla Bulldogs	Saturday, 22 May, 15:30	Kevin Walsh Oval	R. Micallef
Albion Park-Oak Flats Eagles	54 – 4	Kiama Knights	Sunday, 23 May, 15:00	Centenary Field	B. Warren
Nowra-Bomaderry Jets	24 – 48	Stingrays of Shellharbour	Sunday, 23 May, 15:00	Shoalhaven Rugby Park	W. Drury
Bye: Warilla-Lake South Gorillas

==== Round 7 ====
Home	Score	Away	Match information		
Home	Score	Away	Date and time	Venue	Referee
Shellharbour Sharks	26 – 12	Nowra-Bomaderry Jets	Saturday, 29 May, 15:00	Ron Costello Oval	R. Micallef
Kiama Knights	8 – 32	Gerringong Lions	Sunday, 30 May, 15:00	Kiama Showground	P. Lees
Milton-Ulladulla Bulldogs	6 – 42	Stingrays of Shellharbour	Sunday, 30 May, 15:00	Bill Andriske Oval	B. Warren
Warilla-Lake South Gorillas	10 – 42	Jamberoo Superoos	Sunday, 30 May, 15:00	Cec Glenholmes Oval	W. Drury
Bye: Albion Park-Oak Flats Eagles

==== Round 8 ====
Home	Score	Away	Match information		
Home	Score	Away	Date and time	Venue	Referee
Jamberoo Superoos	C – C	Nowra-Bomaderry Jets	Wednesday, 21 July, 19:00	Kevin Walsh Oval	TBC
Warilla-Lake South Gorillas	28 – 20	Albion Park-Oak Flats Eagles	Sunday, 6 June, 15:00	Cec Glenholmes Oval	W. Drury
Milton-Ulladulla Bulldogs	0 – 74	Gerringong Lions	Sunday, 6 June, 15:00	Bill Andriske Oval	R. Micallef
Stingrays of Shellharbour	16 – 22	Kiama Knights	Sunday, 6 June, 15:00	Flinders Field	P. Lees
Bye: Shellharbour Sharks

- Note: The fixture between Jamberoo and Nowra-Bomaderry was postponed due to players waiting for COVID-19 results after a recent outbreak.

==== Round 9 ====
Home	Score	Away	Match information		
Home	Score	Away	Date and time	Venue	Referee
Shellharbour Sharks	12 – 26	Jamberoo Superoos	Saturday, 12 June, 13:15	Ron Costello Oval	B. Warren
Gerringong Lions	52 – 10	Stingrays of Shellharbour	Saturday, 12 June, 15:00	Michael Cronin Oval	W. Drury
Albion Park-Oak Flats Eagles	44 – 14	Milton-Ulladulla Bulldogs	Sunday, 13 June, 15:00	Centenary Field	T. Jordan
Nowra-Bomaderry Jets	20 – 42	Warilla-Lake South Gorillas	Sunday, 13 June, 15:00	Shoalhaven Rugby Park	R. Micallef
Bye: Kiama Knights

==== Round 10 ====
Home	Score	Away	Match information		
Home	Score	Away	Date and time	Venue	Referee
Jamberoo Superoos	26 – 6	Kiama Knights	Saturday, 19 June, 15:00	Kevin Walsh Oval	W. Drury
Warilla-Lake South Gorillas	50 – 24	Shellharbour Sharks	Sunday, 20 June, 15:00	Cec Glenholmes Oval	T. Jordan
Stingrays of Shellharbour	8 – 10	Albion Park-Oak Flats Eagles	Sunday, 20 June, 15:00	Flinders Field	R. Micallef
Milton-Ulladulla Bulldogs	6 – 34	Nowra-Bomaderry Jets	Sunday, 20 June, 15:00	Bill Andriske Oval	B. Warren
Bye: Gerringong Lions

==== Round 11 ====
Home	Score	Away	Match information		
Home	Score	Away	Date and time	Venue	Referee
Gerringong Lions	32 – 18	Warilla-Lake South Gorillas	Saturday, 26 June, 15:00	Michael Cronin Oval	B. Warren
Milton-Ulladulla Bulldogs	6 – 42	Kiama Knights	Saturday, 26 June, 15:00	Bill Andriske Oval	T. Jordan
Shellharbour Sharks	0 – 0	Stingrays of Shellharbour	N/A	Ron Costello Oval	N/A
Albion Park-Oak Flats Eagles	0 – 0	Jamberoo Superoos	N/A	Centenary Field	N/A
Bye: Nowra-Bomaderry Jets

- Note: Fixtures scheduled for Sunday, 27 July were declared to be COVID draws due to the ongoing COVID-19 pandemic in Shellharbour and surrounding regions.

==== Round 12 ====
Home	Score	Away	Match information		
Home	Score	Away	Date and time	Venue	Referee
Jamberoo Superoos	0 – 0	Stingrays of Shellharbour	N/A	Kevin Walsh Oval	N/A
Warilla-Lake South Gorillas	0 – 0	Kiama Knights	N/A	Cec Glenholmes Oval	N/A
Shellharbour Sharks	0 – 0	Albion Park-Oak Flats Eagles	N/A	Ron Costello Oval	N/A
Nowra-Bomaderry Jets	0 – 0	Gerringong Lions	N/A	Shoalhaven Rugby Park	N/A
Bye: Milton-Ulladulla Bulldogs

- Note: All Round 12 & 13 fixtures became COVID draws due to the ongoing COVID-19 pandemic in Shellharbour and surrounding regions.

==== Round 13 ====
Home	Score	Away	Match information		
Home	Score	Away	Date and time	Venue	Referee
Milton-Ulladulla Bulldogs	0 – 0	Warilla-Lake South Gorillas	N/A	Bill Andriske Oval	N/A
Kiama Knights	0 – 0	Shellharbour Sharks	N/A	Kiama Showground	N/A
Jamberoo Superoos	0 – 0	Gerringong Lions	N/A	Kevin Walsh Oval	N/A
Albion Park-Oak Flats Eagles	0 – 0	Nowra-Bomaderry Jets	N/A	Centenary Field	N/A
Bye: Stingrays of Shellharbour

- Note: All Round 12 & 13 fixtures became COVID draws due to the ongoing COVID-19 pandemic in Shellharbour and surrounding regions.

==== Round 14 ====
Home	Score	Away	Match information		
Home	Score	Away	Date and time	Venue	Referee
Gerringong Lions	C – C	Albion Park-Oak Flats Eagles	Saturday, 24 July, 15:00	Michael Cronin Oval	
Shellharbour Sharks	C – C	Milton-Ulladulla Bulldogs	Saturday, 24 July, 15:00	Ron Costello Oval	
Nowra-Bomaderry Jets	C – C	Kiama Knights	Sunday, 25 July, 15:00	Shoalhaven Rugby	
Warilla-Lake South Gorillas	C – C	Stingrays of Shellharbour	Sunday, 25 July, 15:00	Cec Glenholmes Oval	
Bye: Jamberoo Superoos

==== Round 15 ====
Home	Score	Away	Match information		
Home	Score	Away	Date and time	Venue	Referee
Milton-Ulladulla Bulldogs	C – C	Jamberoo Superoos	Saturday, 31 July, 15:00	Bill Andriske Oval	
Kiama Knights	C – C	Albion Park-Oak Flats Eagles	Sunday, 1 August, 15:00	Kiama Showground	
Stingrays of Shellharbour	C – C	Nowra-Bomaderry Jets	Sunday, 1 August, 15:00	Flinders Field	
Shellharbour Sharks	C – C	Gerringong Lions	Sunday, 1 August, 15:30	Ron Costello Oval	
Bye: Warilla-Lake South Gorillas

==== Round 16 ====
Home	Score	Away	Match information		
Home	Score	Away	Date and time	Venue	Referee
Gerringong Lions	C – C	Kiama Knights	Saturday, 7 August, 14:00	Michael Cronin Oval	
Jamberoo Superoos	C – C	Warilla-Lake South Gorillas	Saturday, 7 August, 15:30	Kevin Walsh Oval	
Nowra-Bomaderry Jets	C – C	Shellharbour Sharks	Sunday, 8 August, 15:00	Shoalhaven Rugby Park	
Stingrays of Shellharbour	C – C	Milton-Ulladulla Bulldogs	Sunday, 8 August, 15:30	Flinders Field	
Bye: Albion Park-Oak Flats Eagles

==== Round 17 ====
Home	Score	Away	Match information		
Home	Score	Away	Date and time	Venue	Referee
Gerringong Lions	C – C	Milton-Ulladulla Bulldogs	Saturday, 14 August, 15:00	Michael Cronin Oval	
Nowra-Bomaderry Jets	C – C	Jamberoo Superoos	Sunday, 15 August, 15:00	Shoalhaven Rugby Park	
Albion Park-Oak Flats Eagles	C – C	Warilla-Lake South Gorillas	Sunday, 15 August, 15:00	Centenary Field	
Kiama Knights	C – C	Stingrays of Shellharbour	Sunday, 15 August, 15:00	Kiama Showground	
Bye: Shellharbour Sharks

==== Round 18 ====
Home	Score	Away	Match information		
Home	Score	Away	Date and time	Venue	Referee
Jamberoo Superoos	C – C	Shellharbour Sharks	Saturday, 21 August, 15:30	Kevin Walsh Oval	
Milton-Ulladulla Bulldogs	C – C	Albion Park-Oak Flats Eagles	Sunday, 22 August, 15:00	Bill Andriske Oval	
Warilla-Lake South Gorillas	C – C	Nowra-Bomaderry Jets	Sunday, 22 August, 15:00	Cec Glenholmes Oval	
Stingrays of Shellharbour	C – C	Gerringong Lions	Sunday, 22 August, 15:30	Flinders Field	
Bye: Kiama Knights

=== Finals series ===
Qualifying/elimination finals
2
3
4
5

Minor and major semi-finals
1
2/3
2/3
4/5

Preliminary final
1/2/3
2/3/4/5

Grand final
1/2/3
1/2/3/4/5

Home	Score	Away	Match information		
Home	Score	Away	Date and time	Venue	Referee
Qualifying & elimination finals
	C – C		Saturday, 28 August, 15:00		
	C – C		Sunday, 29 August, 15:00		
Minor and major semi-finals
	C – C		Saturday, 4 September, 15:00		
	C – C		Sunday, 5 September, 15:00		
Preliminary final
	C – C		Saturday, 11 September, 15:00		
Grand final
	C – C		Sunday, 19 September, 15:00		

== Reserve Grade (2nd Grade) ==
2021 Group 7 Rugby League Reserve Grade
- Duration: 10 April – 19 September
- Teams: 10
- Matches played: 31
- Points scored: 1,122
- Broadcast partners: Bar TV Sports
- Top points scorer(s): Craig Nolan (18 points) (as of Rd. 2)
- Top try-scorer(s): Chad Harrison (2 tries); Cooper Tunbridge; Beau Doosey; Jamie Reay; Cooper Lee; Alex Boles; Tyson Cloos; Mark Braine; Brayden Omoeboh; Brayden Swain; Chris Leatinuu; Tyler Johns; Guy Rosewarn; Craig Nolan (as of Rd. 2)

=== Teams ===
Colours	Club	Home ground(s)	2020 position
	Albion Park-Oak Flats Eagles	Centenary Field	6th
	Berry-Shoalhaven Heads Magpies	Berry Showground	9th
	Gerringong Lions	Michael Cronin Oval	2nd
	Jamberoo Superoos	Kevin Walsh Oval	7th
	Kiama Knights	Kiama Showground	5th
	Milton-Ulladulla Bulldogs	Bill Andriske Oval	3rd (runner-ups)
	Nowra-Bomaderry Jets	Shoalhaven Rugby Park	1st (Premiers)
	Shellharbour Sharks	Ron Costello Oval	10th
	Stingrays of Shellharbour	Flinders Field	4th
	Warilla-Lake South Gorillas	Cec Glenholmes Oval	8th

=== Ladder ===
Pos	Team	Pld	W	D	L	B	PF	PA	PD	Pts
1	Gerringong Lions	12	9	2	1	0	314	86	+228	20
2	Stingrays of Shellharbour	12	6	3	3	0	202	106	+96	15
3	Berry-Shoalhaven Heads Magpies	12	6	3	3	0	160	122	+38	15
4	Warilla-Lake South Gorillas	12	6	2	4	0	180	144	+36	14
5	Albion Park-Oak Flats Eagles	12	5	3	4	0	162	136	+26	13
6	Shellharbour Sharks	12	5	3	4	0	174	156	+18	13
7	Nowra-Bomaderry Jets	11	3	3	5	0	156	198	-42	9
8	Jamberoo Superoos	11	2	4	5	0	100	132	-32	8
9	Kiama Knights	12	3	2	7	0	150	202	-52	8
10	Milton-Ulladulla Bulldogs	12	0	3	9	0	106	420	-314	3

=== Season results ===
==== Round 1 ====
Home	Score	Away	Match information		
Home	Score	Away	Date and time	Venue	Referee
Gerringong Lions	18 – 12	Berry-Shoalhaven Heads Magpies	Saturday, 10 April, 14:00	Michael Cronin Oval	M. Goroch
Albion Park-Oak Flats Eagles	20 – 34	Stingrays of Shellharbour	Saturday, 10 April, 17:00	Centenary Field	J. Borg
Kiama Knights	16 – 0	Jamberoo Superoos	Sunday, 11 April, 13:30	Kiama Showground	M. Goroch
Nowra-Bomaderry Jets	48 – 10	Milton-Ulladulla Bulldogs	Sunday, 11 April, 13:30	Shoalhaven Rugby Park	N. Willer
Shellharbour Sharks	16 – 22	Warilla-Lake South Gorillas	Sunday, 11 April, 13:30	Ron Costello Oval	P. Lees

==== Round 2 ====
Home	Score	Away	Match information		
Home	Score	Away	Date and time	Venue	Referee
Jamberoo Superoos	12 – 14	Albion Park-Oak Flats Eagles	Saturday, 17 April, 13:30	Kevin Walsh Oval	T. Jordan
Berry-Shoalhaven Heads Magpies	18 – 12	Nowra-Bomaderry Jets	Saturday, 17 April, 15:00	Berry Showground	M. Goroch
Warilla-Lake South Gorillas	16 – 18	Gerringong Lions	Sunday, 18 April, 13:30	Cec Glenholmes Oval	B. Chamberlain
Kiama Knights	28 – 12	Milton-Ulladulla Bulldogs	Sunday, 18 April, 13:30	Kiama Showground	P. Lees
Stingrays of Shellharbour	6 – 10	Shellharbour Sharks	Sunday, 18 April, 14:00	Flinders Field	N. McInerney

==== Round 3 ====
Home	Score	Away	Match information		
Home	Score	Away	Date and time	Venue	Referee
Gerringong Lions	68 – 0	Nowra-Bomaderry Jets	Saturday, 1 May, 13:30	Michael Cronin Oval	N. McInerney
Milton-Ulladulla Bulldogs	10 – 28	Berry-Shoalhaven Heads Magpies	Saturday, 1 May, 15:00	Bill Andriske Oval	R. Micallef
Kiama Knights	10 – 16	Warilla-Lake South Gorillas	Sunday, 2 May, 13:30	Kiama Showground	J. Borg
Albion Park-Oak Flats Eagles	12 – 18	Shellharbour Sharks	Sunday, 2 May, 13:30	Centenary Field	P. Lees
Stingrays of Shellharbour	20 – 12	Jamberoo Superoos	Sunday, 2 May, 14:00	Flinders Field	M. Goroch

==== Round 4 ====
Home	Score	Away	Match information		
Home	Score	Away	Date and time	Venue	Referee
Gerringong Lions	P – P	Jamberoo Superoos	TBC	Michael Cronin Oval	
Shellharbour Sharks	P – P	Kiama Knights	TBC	Ron Costello Oval	
Berry-Shoalhaven Heads Magpies	P – P	Stingrays of Shellharbour	TBC	Berry Showground	
Warilla-Lake South Gorillas	P – P	Milton-Ulladulla Bulldogs	TBC	Cec Glenholmes Oval	
Nowra-Bomaderry Jets	P – P	Albion Park-Oak Flats Eagles	TBC	Shoalhaven Rugby Park	

- All fixtures for Round 4 were postponed because of ground closures due to rainfall.

==== Round 5 ====
Home	Score	Away	Match information		
Home	Score	Away	Date and time	Venue	Referee
Jamberoo Superoos	4 – 12	Berry-Shoalhaven Heads Magpies	Saturday, 15 May, 15:00	Kevin Walsh Oval	N. McInerney
Albion Park-Oak Flats Eagles	0 – 26	Gerringong Lions	Saturday, 15 May, 17:00	Centenary Field	J. Borg
Kiama Knights	12 – 18	Nowra-Bomaderry Jets	Sunday, 16 May, 13:30	Kiama Showground	W. Cooke
Milton-Ulladulla Bulldogs	18 – 42	Shellharbour Sharks	Sunday, 16 May, 13:30	Bill Andriske Oval	M. Goroch
Stingrays of Shellharbour	22 – 4	Warilla-Lake South Gorillas	Sunday, 16 May, 14:00	Flinders Field	P. Lees

==== Round 6 ====
Home	Score	Away	Match information		
Home	Score	Away	Date and time	Venue	Referee
Gerringong Lions	36 – 10	Shellharbour Sharks	Saturday, 22 May, 13:30	Michael Cronin Oval	N. McInerney
Jamberoo Superoos	18 – 18	Milton-Ulladulla Bulldogs	Saturday, 22 May, 14:00	Kevin Walsh Oval	B. Chamberlain
Albion Park-Oak Flats Eagles	16 – 12	Kiama Knights	Sunday, 23 May, 13:30	Centenary Field	M. Goroch
Nowra-Bomaderry Jets	14 – 22	Stingrays of Shellharbour	Sunday, 23 May, 13:30	Shoalhaven Rugby Park	P. Lees
Warilla-Lake South Gorillas	24 – 6	Berry-Shoalhaven Heads Magpies	Sunday, 23 May, 15:00	Cec Glenholmes Oval	J. Borg

==== Round 7 ====
Home	Score	Away	Match information		
Home	Score	Away	Date and time	Venue	Referee
Shellharbour Sharks	22 – 14	Nowra-Bomaderry Jets	Saturday, 29 May, 13:30	Ron Costello Oval	B. Warren
Berry-Shoalhaven Heads Magpies	24 – 6	Albion Park-Oak Flats Eagles	Saturday, 29 May, 15:00	Berry Showground	M. Goroch
Kiama Knights	10 – 34	Gerringong Lions	Sunday, 30 May, 13:30	Kiama Showground	N. Willer
Milton-Ulladulla Bulldogs	0 – 52	Stingrays of Shellharbour	Sunday, 30 May, 13:30	Bill Andriske Oval	K. Whittford
Warilla-Lake South Gorillas	38 – 4	Jamberoo Superoos	Sunday, 30 May, 13:30	Cec Glenholmes Oval	J. Borg

==== Round 8 ====
Home	Score	Away	Match information		
Home	Score	Away	Date and time	Venue	Referee
Jamberoo Superoos	–	Nowra-Bomaderry Jets	Wednesday, 21 July, 17:30	Kevin Walsh Oval	TBC
Berry-Shoalhaven Heads Magpies	14 – 38	Shellharbour Sharks	Saturday, 5 June, 15:00	Berry Showground	J. Borg
Warilla-Lake South Gorillas	6 – 26	Albion Park-Oak Flats Eagles	Sunday, 6 June, 13:30	Cec Glenholmes Oval	T. Jordan
Milton-Ulladulla Bulldogs	4 – 62	Gerringong Lions	Sunday, 6 June, 13:30	Bill Andriske Oval	N. Willer
Stingrays of Shellharbour	38 – 6	Kiama Knights	Sunday, 6 June, 13:30	Flinders Field	M. Goroch

- Note: The fixture between Jamberoo and Nowra-Bomaderry was postponed due to players waiting for COVID-19 results after a recent outbreak.

==== Round 9 ====
Home	Score	Away	Match information		
Home	Score	Away	Date and time	Venue	Referee
Shellharbour Sharks	10 – 22	Jamberoo Superoos	Saturday, 12 June, 11:45	Ron Costello Oval	W. Cooke
Gerringong Lions	20 – 4	Stingrays of Shellharbour	Saturday, 12 June, 13:30	Michael Cronin Oval	N. McInerney
Kiama Knights	4 – 24	Berry-Shoalhaven Heads Magpies	Saturday, 12 June, 15:00	Kiama Showground	M. Goroch
Albion Park-Oak Flats Eagles	F – F	Milton-Ulladulla Bulldogs	Sunday, 13 June, 13:30	Centenary Field	N/A
Nowra-Bomaderry Jets	10 – 30	Warilla-Lake South Gorillas	Sunday, 13 June, 13:30	Shoalhaven Rugby Park	P. Lees

- Note: The fixture between Albion Park-Oak Flats and Milton-Ulladulla was forfeited by Milton-Ulladulla; therefore, Albion Park-Oak Flats were awarded an automatic fifty point win.

==== Round 10 ====
Home	Score	Away	Match information		
Home	Score	Away	Date and time	Venue	Referee
Jamberoo Superoos	28 – 4	Kiama Knights	Saturday, 19 June, 13:30	Kevin Walsh Oval	N. McInerney
Berry-Shoalhaven Heads Magpies	22 – 6	Gerringong Lions	Saturday, 19 June, 15:00	Berry Showground	W. Cooke
Warilla-Lake South Gorillas	12 – 8	Shellharbour Sharks	Sunday, 20 June, 13:30	Cec Glenholmes Oval	N. Willer
Stingrays of Shellharbour	4 – 20	Albion Park-Oak Flats Eagles	Sunday, 20 June, 13:30	Flinders Field	P. Lees
Milton-Ulladulla Bulldogs	16 – 40	Nowra-Bomaderry Jets	Sunday, 20 June, 13:30	Bill Andriske Oval	J. Borg

==== Round 11 ====
Home	Score	Away	Match information		
Home	Score	Away	Date and time	Venue	Referee
Gerringong Lions	26 – 12	Warilla-Lake South Gorillas	Saturday, 26 June, 13:30	Michael Cronin Oval	N. McInerney
Milton-Ulladulla Bulldogs	52 – 18	Kiama Knights	Saturday, 26 June, 13:30	Bill Andriske Oval	K. Whittford
Shellharbour Sharks	0 – 0	Stingrays of Shellharbour	N/A	Ron Costello Oval	N/A
Albion Park-Oak Flats Eagles	0 – 0	Jamberoo Superoos	N/A	Centenary Field	N/A
Nowra-Bomaderry Jets	0 – 0	Berry-Shoalhaven Heads Magpies	N/A	Shoalhaven Rugby Park	N/A

- Note: Fixtures scheduled for Sunday, 27 July were declared to be COVID draws due to the ongoing COVID-19 pandemic in Shellharbour and surrounding regions.

==== Round 12 ====
Home	Score	Away	Match information		
Home	Score	Away	Date and time	Venue	Referee
Jamberoo Superoos	0 – 0	Stingrays of Shellharbour	N/A	Kevin Walsh Oval	N/A
Berry-Shoalhaven Heads Magpies	0 – 0	Milton-Ulladulla Bulldogs	N/A	Berry Showground	N/A
Warilla-Lake South Gorillas	0 – 0	Kiama Knights	N/A	Cec Glenholmes Oval	N/A
Shellharbour Sharks	0 – 0	Albion Park-Oak Flats Eagles	N/A	Ron Costello Oval	N/A
Nowra-Bomaderry Jets	0 – 0	Gerringong Lions	N/A	Shoalhaven Rugby Park	N/A

- Note: All Round 12 & 13 fixtures became COVID draws due to the ongoing COVID-19 pandemic in Shellharbour and surrounding regions.

==== Round 13 ====
Home	Score	Away	Match information		
Home	Score	Away	Date and time	Venue	Referee
Milton-Ulladulla Bulldogs	0 – 0	Warilla-Lake South Gorillas	N/A	Bill Andriske Oval	N/A
Kiama Knights	0 – 0	Shellharbour Sharks	N/A	Kiama Showground	N/A
Jamberoo Superoos	0 – 0	Gerringong Lions	N/A	Kevin Walsh Oval	N/A
Albion Park-Oak Flats Eagles	0 – 0	Nowra-Bomaderry Jets	N/A	Centenary Field	N/A
Stingrays of Shellharbour	0 – 0	Berry-Shoalhaven Heads Magpies	N/A	Flinders Field	N/A

- Note: All Round 12 & 13 fixtures became COVID draws due to the ongoing COVID-19 pandemic in Shellharbour and surrounding regions.

==== Round 14 ====
Home	Score	Away	Match information		
Home	Score	Away	Date and time	Venue	Referee
Gerringong Lions	C – C	Albion Park-Oak Flats Eagles	Saturday, 24 July, 13:30	Michael Cronin Oval	
Shellharbour Sharks	C – C	Milton-Ulladulla Bulldogs	Saturday, 24 July, 13:30	Ron Costello Oval	
Berry-Shoalhaven Heads Magpies	C – C	Jamberoo Superoos	Sunday, 25 July, 13:30	Berry Showground	
Nowra-Bomaderry Jets	C – C	Kiama Knights	Sunday, 25 July, 13:30	Shoalhaven Rugby Park	
Warilla-Lake South Gorillas	C – C	Stingrays of Shellharbour	Sunday, 25 July, 15:00	Cec Glenholmes Oval	

==== Round 15 ====
Home	Score	Away	Match information		
Home	Score	Away	Date and time	Venue	Referee
Milton-Ulladulla Bulldogs	C – C	Jamberoo Superoos	Saturday, 31 July, 13:30	Bill Andriske Oval	
Berry-Shoalhaven Heads Magpies	C – C	Warilla-Lake South Gorillas	Saturday, 31 July, 15:00	Berry Showground	
Kiama Knights	C – C	Albion Park-Oak Flats Eagles	Sunday, 1 August, 13:30	Kiama Showground	
Stingrays of Shellharbour	C – C	Nowra-Bomaderry Jets	Sunday, 1 August, 13:30	Flinders Field	
Shellharbour Sharks	C – C	Gerringong Lions	Sunday, 1 August, 14:00	Ron Costello Oval	

==== Round 16 ====
Home	Score	Away	Match information		
Home	Score	Away	Date and time	Venue	Referee
Gerringong Lions	C – C	Kiama Knights	Saturday, 7 August, 12:30	Michael Cronin Oval	
Jamberoo Superoos	C – C	Warilla-Lake South Gorillas	Saturday, 7 August, 14:00	Kevin Walsh Oval	
Nowra-Bomaderry Jets	C – C	Shellharbour Sharks	Sunday, 8 August, 13:30	Shoalhaven Rugby Park	
Stingrays of Shellharbour	C – C	Milton-Ulladulla Bulldogs	Sunday, 8 August, 14:00	Flinders Field	
Albion Park-Oak Flats Eagles	C – C	Berry-Shoalhaven Heads Magpies	Sunday, 8 August, 15:00	Centenary Field	

==== Round 17 ====
Home	Score	Away	Match information		
Home	Score	Away	Date and time	Venue	Referee
Gerringong Lions	C – C	Milton-Ulladulla Bulldogs	Saturday, 14 August, 13:30	Michael Cronin Oval	
Shellharbour Sharks	C – C	Berry-Shoalhaven Heads Magpies	Saturday, 14 August, 15:00	Ron Costello Oval	
Nowra-Bomaderry Jets	C – C	Jamberoo Superoos	Sunday, 15 August, 13:30	Shoalhaven Rugby Park	
Albion Park-Oak Flats Eagles	C – C	Warilla-Lake South Gorillas	Sunday, 15 August, 13:30	Centenary Field	
Kiama Knights	C – C	Stingrays of Shellharbour	Sunday, 15 August, 13:30	Kiama Showground	

==== Round 18 ====
Home	Score	Away	Match information		
Home	Score	Away	Date and time	Venue	Referee
Jamberoo Superoos	C – C	Shellharbour Sharks	Saturday, 21 August, 14:00	Kevin Walsh Oval	
Berry-Shoalhaven Heads Magpies	C – C	Kiama Knights	Saturday, 21 August, 15:00	Berry Showground	
Milton-Ulladulla Bulldogs	C – C	Albion Park-Oak Flats Eagles	Sunday, 22 August, 13:30	Bill Andriske Oval	
Warilla-Lake South Gorillas	C – C	Nowra-Bomaderry Jets	Sunday, 22 August, 13:30	Cec Glenholmes Oval	
Stingrays of Shellharbour	C – C	Gerringong Lions	Sunday, 22 August, 14:00	Flinders Field	

=== Finals series ===
Qualifying/elimination finals
2
3
4
5

Minor and major semi-finals
1
2/3
2/3
4/5

Preliminary final
1/2/3
2/3/4/5

Grand final
1/2/3
1/2/3/4/5

Home	Score	Away	Match information		
Home	Score	Away	Date and time	Venue	Referee
Qualifying & elimination finals
	C – C		Saturday, 28 August, 13:30		
	C – C		Sunday, 29 August, 13:30		
Minor and major semi-finals
	C – C		Saturday, 4 September, 13:30		
	C – C		Sunday, 5 September, 13:30		
Preliminary final
	C – C		Saturday, 11 September, 13:30		
Grand final
	C – C		Sunday, 19 September, 13:30		

== Regan Cup (3rd Grade) ==
2021 Group 7 Rugby League Regan Cup
- Duration: 9 April – 12 September
- Teams: 11
- Matches played: 32
- Points scored: 1,376
- Broadcast partners: Bar TV Sports
- Top points scorer(s): Tyson Gosstray (24 points) (as of Rd. 2)
- Top try-scorer: Will Ray (4 tries) (as of Rd. 2)

=== Teams ===
Colours	Club	Home ground(s)	2020 positions
	Albion Park Outlaws	Des King Oval	N/A
	Albion Park-Oak Flats Eagles	Centenary Field	N/A
	Culburra Dolphins	Crookhaven Park	2nd
	Jamberoo Superoos	Kevin Walsh Oval	4th
	Mt. Warrigal United Kooris	Oakleigh Park	1st (runner-ups)
	Robertson-Burrawang Spuddies	Robertson Showground	3rd (Premiers)
	Shellharbour Sharks	Ron Costello Oval	N/A
	Southern Highlands Storm	Loseby Park, Community Oval	N/A
	Stingrays of Shellharbour	Flinders Field	N/A
	Sussex Inlet Panthers	Finkernagle Oval	N/A
	Wreck Bay United Bears	Francis Ryan Reserve	N/A

=== Ladder ===
Pos	Team	Pld	W	D	L	B	PF	PA	PD	Pts
1	Sussex Inlet Panthers	10	7	2	1	2	300	38	+262	20
2	Mt. Warrigal United Kooris	10	6	3	1	2	206	124	+82	19
3	Robertson-Burrawang Spuddies	11	6	4	1	1	201	146	+55	18
4	Stingrays of Shellharbour	11	6	3	2	1	226	128	+98	17
5	Wreck Bay United Bears	10	5	3	2	2	212	126	+86	17
6	Culburra Dolphins	11	6	3	2	1	202	146	+56	17
7	Southern Highlands Storm	11	3	2	6	1	162	205	-43	10
8	Albion Park-Oak Flats Eagles	11	3	2	6	1	154	206	-52	10
9	Albion Park Outlaws	11	2	3	6	1	124	270	-146	9
10	Shellharbour Sharks	11	1	2	8	1	80	274	-194	6
11	Jamberoo Superoos	11	0	3	8	1	62	246	-184	5

=== Season results ===
==== Round 1 ====
Home	Score	Away	Match information		
Home	Score	Away	Date and time	Venue	Referee
Shellharbour Sharks	10 – 30	Robertson-Burrawang Spuddies	Friday, 9 April, 19:30	Ron Costello Oval	M. Booth
Sussex Inlet Panthers	52 – 6	Albion Park Outlaws	Saturday, 10 April, 14:00	Finkernagle Oval	W. Drury
Culburra Dolphins	52 – 6	Jamberoo Superoos	Saturday, 10 April, 14:00	Crookhaven Park	M. Booth
Albion Park-Oak Flats Eagles	20 – 28	Stingrays of Shellharbour	Saturday, 10 April, 15:30	Centenary Field	W. Cooke
Southern Highlands Storm	10 – 22	Mt. Warrigal United Kooris	Sunday, 11 April, 14:00	Loseby Park	G. Nolan
Bye: Wreck Bay United Bears

==== Round 2 ====
Home	Score	Away	Match information		
Home	Score	Away	Date and time	Venue	Referee
Jamberoo Superoos	4 – 32	Albion Park-Oak Flats Eagles	Saturday, 17 April, 12:00	Kevin Walsh Oval	W. Cooke
Robertson-Burrawang Spuddies	32 – 6	Southern Highlands Storm	Saturday, 17 April, 14:00	Robertson Showground	R. Micallef
Culburra Dolphins	14 – 22	Sussex Inlet Panthers	Saturday, 17 April, 14:00	Crookhaven Park	W. Drury
Wreck Bay United Bears	48 – 6	Albion Park Outlaws	Saturday, 17 April, 14:00	Francis Ryan Reserve	P. Lewis
Stingrays of Shellharbour	36 – 0	Shellharbour Sharks	Sunday, 18 April, 11:00	Flinders Field	M. Booth
Bye: Mt. Warrigal United Kooris

==== Round 3 ====
Home	Score	Away	Match information		
Home	Score	Away	Date and time	Venue	Referee
Albion Park Outlaws	16 – 28	Mt. Warrigal United Kooris	Friday, 30 April, 19:30	Des King Oval	M. Booth
Culburra Dolphins	22 – 22	Robertson-Burrawang Spuddies	Saturday, 1 May, 14:00	Crookhaven Park	K. Whittford
Southern Highlands Storm	28 – 32	Wreck Bay United Bears	Saturday, 1 May, 14:00	Community Oval	M. Goroch
Stingrays of Shellharbour	28 – 6	Jamberoo Superoos	Sunday, 2 May, 11:00	Flinders Field	B. Chamberlain
Albion Park-Oak Flats Eagles	30 – 12	Shellharbour Sharks	Sunday, 2 May, 12:00	Centenary Field	G. Nolan
Bye: Sussex Inlet Panthers

==== Round 4 ====
Home	Score	Away	Match information		
Home	Score	Away	Date and time	Venue	Referee
Shellharbour Sharks	P – P	Culburra Dolphins	TBC	Ron Costello Oval	
Southern Highlands Storm	P – P	Albion Park Outlaws	TBC	Community Oval	
Mt. Warrigal United Kooris	P – P	Wreck Bay United Bears	TBC	Oakleigh Park	
Robertson-Burrawang Spuddies	P – P	Jamberoo Superoos	TBC	Robertson Showground	
Sussex Inlet Panthers	P – P	Stingrays of Shellharbour	TBC	Finkernagle Oval	
Bye: Albion Park-Oak Flats Eagles

- All fixtures for Round 4 were postponed because of ground closures due to rainfall.

==== Round 5 ====
Home	Score	Away	Match information		
Home	Score	Away	Date and time	Venue	Referee
Jamberoo Superoos	22 – 32	Mt. Warrigal United Kooris	Saturday, 15 May, 12:00	Kevin Walsh Oval	K. Whittford
Albion Park Outlaws	16 – 22	Wreck Bay United Bears	Saturday, 15 May, 14:00	Des King Oval	G. Nolan
Sussex Inlet Panthers	F – F	Shellharbour Sharks	Saturday, 15 May, 14:00	Finkernagle Oval	N/A
Albion Park-Oak Flats Eagles	16 – 34	Southern Highlands Storm	Saturday, 15 May, 15:30	Centenary Field	P. Lewis
Stingrays of Shellharbour	36 – 6	Robertson-Burrawang Spuddies	Sunday, 16 May, 11:00	Flinders Field	G. Nolan
Bye: Culburra Dolphins

- Note: The fixture between Sussex Inlet Panthers and Shellharbour Sharks was forfeited by Shellharbour Sharks; therefore, Sussex Inlet Panthers were awarded an automatic fifty point win.

==== Round 6 ====
Home	Score	Away	Match information		
Home	Score	Away	Date and time	Venue	Referee
Jamberoo Superoos	4 – 20	Albion Park Outlaws	Saturday, 22 May, 11:00	Kevin Walsh Oval	M. Bonnie
Robertson-Burrawang Spuddies	16 – 16	Mt. Warrigal United Kooris	Saturday, 22 May, 14:00	Robertson Showground	M. Booth
Wreck Bay United Bears	44 – 8	Stingrays of Shellharbour	Saturday, 22 May, 14:00	Francis Ryan Reserve	P. Lewis
Albion Park-Oak Flats Eagles	16 – 18	Culburra Dolphins	Sunday, 23 May, 12:00	Centenary Field	W. Drury
Southern Highlands Storm	30 – 22	Shellharbour Sharks	Sunday, 23 May, 14:00	Community Oval	G. Nolan
Bye: Sussex Inlet Panthers

==== Round 7 ====
Home	Score	Away	Match information		
Home	Score	Away	Date and time	Venue	Referee
Albion Park Outlaws	24 – 24	Stingrays of Shellharbour	Friday, 28 May, 19:30	Des King Oval	G. Nolan
Robertson-Burrawang Spuddies	28 – 24	Wreck Bay United Bears	Saturday, 29 May, 14:00	Robertson Showground	W. Drury
Mt. Warrigal United Kooris	42 – 6	Jamberoo Superoos	Saturday, 29 May, 14:00	Oakleigh Park	M. Bonnie
Culburra Dolphins	22 – 6	Southern Highlands Storm	Saturday, 29 May, 14:00	Crookhaven Park	P. Lewis
Sussex Inlet Panthers	42 – 0	Albion Park-Oak Flats Eagles	Sunday, 30 May, 14:00	Finkernagle Oval	M. Booth
Bye: Shellharbour Sharks

==== Round 8 ====
Home	Score	Away	Match information		
Home	Score	Away	Date and time	Venue	Referee
Albion Park Outlaws	F – F	Sussex Inlet Panthers	Saturday, 5 June, 14:00	Des King Oval	N/A
Wreck Bay United Bears	0 – 0	Southern Highlands Storm	N/A	Francis Ryan Reserve	N/A
Robertson-Burrawang Spuddies	24 – 12	Albion Park-Oak Flats Eagles	Saturday, 5 June, 14:00	Robertson Showground	E. Drury
Stingrays of Shellharbour	14 – 20	Culburra Dolphins	Sunday, 6 June, 12:00	Flinders Field	D. Chamberlain
Mt. Warrigal United Kooris	38 – 6	Shellharbour Sharks	Sunday, 6 June, 14:00	Oakleigh Park	M. Booth
Bye: Jamberoo Superoos

- Note: The fixture between Wreck Bay United and Southern Highlands was declared to be a COVID draw due to a spike in COVID-19 cases in the region.
- Note: The fixture between Albion Park Outlaws and Sussex Inlet was forfeited by Albion Park; therefore, Sussex Inlet were awarded an automatic fifty point win.

==== Round 9 ====
Home	Score	Away	Match information		
Home	Score	Away	Date and time	Venue	Referee
Shellharbour Sharks	14 – 10	Jamberoo Superoos	Friday, 11 June, 19:30	Ron Costello Oval	N. Willer
Southern Highlands Storm	12 – 21	Robertson-Burrawang Spuddies	Saturday, 12 June, 14:00	Community Oval	M. Bonnie
Culburra Dolphins	36 – 28	Wreck Bay United Bears	Saturday, 12 June, 14:00	Crookhaven Park	K. Whittford
Albion Park-Oak Flats Eagles	28 – 18	Albion Park Outlaws	Sunday, 13 June, 12:00	Centenary Field	J. Borg
Sussex Inlet Panthers	42 – 0	Mt. Warrigal United Kooris	Sunday, 13 June, 14:00	Finkernagle Oval	E. Drury
Bye: Stingrays of Shellharbour

==== Round 10 ====
Home	Score	Away	Match information		
Home	Score	Away	Date and time	Venue	Referee
Jamberoo Superoos	4 – 32	Sussex Inlet Panthers	Saturday, 19 June, 10:30	Kevin Walsh Oval	P. Lewis
Wreck Bay United Bears	14 – 4	Culburra Dolphins	Saturday, 19 June, 14:00	Francis Ryan Reserve	M. Booth
Robertson-Burrawang Spuddies	20 – 8	Shellharbour Sharks	Saturday, 19 June, 14:00	Robertson Showground	D. Chamberlain
Stingrays of Shellharbour	22 – 0	Albion Park-Oak Flats Eagles	Sunday, 20 June, 12:00	Flinders Field	M. Goroch
Mt. Warrigal United Kooris	28 – 22	Southern Highlands Storm	Sunday, 20 June, 14:00	Oakleigh Park	G. Nolan
Bye: Albion Park Outlaws

==== Round 11 ====
Home	Score	Away	Match information		
Home	Score	Away	Date and time	Venue	Referee
Shellharbour Sharks	8 – 30	Stingrays of Shellharbour	Friday, 25 June, 19:30	Ron Costello Oval	M. Goroch
Southern Highlands Storm	14 – 10	Sussex Inlet Panthers	Saturday, 26 June, 14:00	Loseby Park	M. Bonnie
Albion Park Outlaws	18 – 14	Culburra Dolphins	Saturday, 26 June, 14:00	Des King Oval	R. Micallef
Albion Park-Oak Flats Eagles	0 – 0	Jamberoo Superoos	N/A	Centenary Field	N/A
Bye: Mt. Warrigal United Kooris, Robertson-Burrawang Spuddies, Wreck Bay United Bears

- Note: Fixtures scheduled for Sunday, 27 July were declared to be COVID draws due to the ongoing COVID-19 pandemic in Shellharbour and surrounding regions.

==== Round 12 ====
Home	Score	Away	Match information		
Home	Score	Away	Date and time	Venue	Referee
Jamberoo Superoos	0 – 0	Stingrays of Shellharbour	N/A	Kevin Walsh Oval	N/A
Robertson-Burrawang Spuddies	0 – 0	Albion Park Outlaws	N/A	Robertson Showground	N/A
Wreck Bay United Bears	0 – 0	Albion Park-Oak Flats Eagles	N/A	Francis Ryan Reserve	N/A
Shellharbour Sharks	0 – 0	Sussex Inlet Panthers	N/A	Ron Costello Oval	N/A
Mt. Warrigal United Kooris	0 – 0	Culburra Dolphins	N/A	Oakleigh Park	N/A
Bye: Southern Highlands Storm

- Note: All Round 12 & 13 fixtures became COVID draws due to the ongoing COVID-19 pandemic in Shellharbour and surrounding regions.

==== Round 13 ====
Home	Score	Away	Match information		
Home	Score	Away	Date and time	Venue	Referee
Albion Park Outlaws	0 – 0	Robertson-Burrawang Spuddies	N/A	Des King Oval	N/A
Jamberoo Superoos	0 – 0	Southern Highlands Storm	N/A	Kevin Walsh Oval	N/A
Sussex Inlet Panthers	0 – 0	Wreck Bay United Bears	N/A	Finkernagle Oval	N/A
Stingrays of Shellharbour	0 – 0	Mt. Warrigal United Kooris	N/A	Flinders Field	N/A
Culburra Dolphins	0 – 0	Shellharbour Sharks	N/A	Crookhaven Park	N/A
Bye: Albion Park-Oak Flats Eagles

- Note: All Round 12 & 13 fixtures became COVID draws due to the ongoing COVID-19 pandemic in Shellharbour and surrounding regions.

==== Round 14 ====
Home	Score	Away	Match information		
Home	Score	Away	Date and time	Venue	Referee
Shellharbour Sharks	C – C	Albion Park Outlaws	Friday, 23 July, 19:30	Ron Costello Oval	
Robertson-Burrawang Spuddies	C – C	Stingrays of Shellharbour	Saturday, 24 July, 14:00	Robertson Showground	
Wreck Bay United Bears	C – C	Jamberoo Superoos	Saturday, 24 July, 14:00	Francis Ryan Reserve	
Mt. Warrigal United Kooris	C – C	Sussex Inlet Panthers	Saturday, 24 July, 14:00	Oakleigh Park	
Southern Highlands Storm	C – C	Albion Park-Oak Flats Eagles	Sunday, 25 July, 14:00	Community Oval	
Bye: Culburra Dolphins

==== Round 15 ====
Home	Score	Away	Match information		
Home	Score	Away	Date and time	Venue	Referee
Albion Park Outlaws	C – C	Southern Highlands Storm	Saturday, 31 July, 14:00	Des King Oval	
Culburra Dolphins	C – C	Albion Park-Oak Flats Eagles	Saturday, 31 July, 14:00	Crookhaven Park	
Shellharbour Sharks	C – C	Wreck Bay United Bears	Sunday, 1 August, 10:00	Ron Costello Oval	
Sussex Inlet Panthers	C – C	Jamberoo Superoos	Sunday, 1 August, 14:00	Finkernagle Oval	
Mt. Warrigal United Kooris	C – C	Robertson-Burrawang Spuddies	Sunday, 1 August, 14:00	Oakleigh Park	
Bye: Stingrays of Shellharbour

==== Round 16 ====
Home	Score	Away	Match information		
Home	Score	Away	Date and time	Venue	Referee
Jamberoo Superoos	C – C	Robertson-Burrawang Spuddies	Saturday, 7 August, 11:00	Kevin Walsh Oval	
Wreck Bay United Bears	C – C	Mt. Warrigal United Kooris	Saturday, 7 August, 14:00	Francis Ryan Reserve	
Southern Highlands Storm	C – C	Culburra Dolphins	Saturday, 7 August, 14:00	Community Oval	
Stingrays of Shellharbour	C – C	Albion Park Outlaws	Sunday, 8 August, 11:00	Flinders Field	
Albion Park-Oak Flats Eagles	C – C	Sussex Inlet Panthers	Sunday, 8 August, 12:30	Centenary Field	
Bye: Shellharbour Sharks

==== Round 17 ====
Home	Score	Away	Match information		
Home	Score	Away	Date and time	Venue	Referee
Shellharbour Sharks	C – C	Mt. Warrigal United Kooris	Saturday, 14 August, 12:00	Ron Costello Oval	
Culburra Dolphins	C – C	Stingrays of Shellharbour	Saturday, 14 August, 14:00	Crookhaven Park	
Sussex Inlet Panthers	C – C	Robertson-Burrawang Spuddies	Saturday, 14 August, 14:00	Finkernagle Oval	
Albion Park-Oak Flats Eagles	C – C	Wreck Bay United Bears	Sunday, 15 August, 11:00	Centenary Field	
Bye: Jamberoo Superoos, Albion Park Outlaws, Southern Highlands Storm

==== Round 18 ====
Home	Score	Away	Match information		
Home	Score	Away	Date and time	Venue	Referee
Albion Park Outlaws	C – C	Shellharbour Sharks	Friday, 20 August, 18:30	Des King Oval	
Jamberoo Superoos	C – C	Culburra Dolphins	Saturday, 21 August, 11:00	Kevin Walsh Oval	
Wreck Bay United Bears	C – C	Sussex Inlet Panthers	Saturday, 21 August, 14:00	Francis Ryan Reserve	
Mt. Warrigal United Kooris	C – C	Albion Park-Oak Flats Eagles	Saturday, 21 August, 14:00	Oakleigh Park	
Stingrays of Shellharbour	C – C	Southern Highlands Storm	Sunday, 22 August, 11:00	Flinders Field	
Bye: Robertson-Burrawang Spuddies

=== Finals series ===
Minor and major semi-finals
1
2
3
4

Preliminary final
1/2
3/4

Grand final
1/2
1/2/3/4

Home	Score	Away	Match information		
Home	Score	Away	Date and time	Venue	Referee
Minor and major semi-finals
	C – C		Saturday, 28 August, 14:00		
	C – C		Sunday, 29 August, 14:00		
Preliminary final
	C – C		Sunday, 5 September, 14:00		
Grand final
	C – C		Sunday, 12 September, 14:00		

== Under-18's ==
2021 Group 7 Rugby League Under-18's
- Duration: 10 April – 19 September
- Teams: 9
- Matches played: 25
- Points scored: 1,306
- Broadcast partners: Bar TV Sports
- Top points scorer: Jake Hay (28 points) (as of Rd. 2)
- Top try-scorer(s): Liam Holland (all 3 tries); Mason Hughes; Sam England; Jake Hay; Kane Stage (as of Rd. 2)

=== Teams ===
Colours	Club	Home ground(s)	2020 positions
	Gerringong Lions	Michael Cronin Oval	5th
	Jamberoo Superoos	Kevin Walsh Oval	10th
	Kiama Knights	Kiama Showground	2nd
	Milton-Ulladulla Bulldogs	Bill Andriske Oval	4th
	Mt. Warrigal United Kooris	Oakleigh Park	N/A
	Nowra-Bomaderry Jets	Shoalhaven Rugby Park	7th
	Shellharbour Sharks	Ron Costello Oval	3rd (Premiers)
	Stingrays of Shellharbour	Flinders Field	1st (runner-ups)
	Warilla-Lake South Gorillas	Cec Glenholmes Oval	9th

=== Ladder ===
Pos	Team	Pld	W	D	L	B	PF	PA	PD	Pts
1	Gerringong Lions	11	9	2	0	1	474	92	+382	22
2	Nowra-Bomaderry Jets	10	7	2	1`	1	254	100	+154	18
3	Stingrays of Shellharbour	10	5	3	2	2	296	96	+200	17
4	Shellharbour Sharks	10	4	2	4	2	310	182	+128	14
5	Milton-Ulladulla Bulldogs	11	5	2	4	1	256	194	+62	14
6	Warilla-Lake South Gorillas	11	4	2	5	1	166	358	-192	12
7	Jamberoo Superoos	9	2	2	5	2	108	217	-109	10
8	Mt. Warrigal United Kooris	11	1	3	7	1	58	376	-318	7
9	Kiama Knights	11	1	2	8	1	83	396	-313	6

=== Season results ===
==== Round 1 ====
Home	Score	Away	Match information		
Home	Score	Away	Date and time	Venue	Referee
Gerringong Lions	F – F	Mt. Warrigal United Kooris	Saturday, 10 April, 12:30	Michael Cronin Oval	N/A
Kiama Knights	8 – 30	Jamberoo Superoos	Sunday, 11 April, 12:00	Kiama Showground	K. Mounfield
Nowra-Bomaderry Jets	38 – 10	Milton-Ulladulla Bulldogs	Sunday, 11 April, 12:00	Shoalhaven Rugby Park	M. Bonnie
Shellharbour Sharks	60 – 12	Warilla-Lake South Gorillas	Sunday, 11 April, 12:00	Ron Costello Oval	T. Power
Bye: Stingrays of Shellharbour

- Note: The fixture between Gerringong and Mt. Warrigal United was forfeited by Mt. Warrigal United; therefore, Gerringong were awarded an automatic fifty point win.

==== Round 2 ====
Home	Score	Away	Match information		
Home	Score	Away	Date and time	Venue	Referee
Warilla-Lake South Gorillas	12 – 60	Gerringong Lions	Sunday, 18 April, 12:00	Cec Glenholmes Oval	K. Mounfield
Kiama Knights	8 – 54	Milton-Ulladulla Bulldogs	Sunday, 18 April, 12:00	Kiama Showground	T. Power
Stingrays of Shellharbour	30 – 26	Shellharbour Sharks	Sunday, 18 April, 12:30	Flinders Field	N. Willer
Mt. Warrigal United Kooris	0 – 36	Nowra-Bomaderry Jets	Sunday, 18 April, 14:00	Oakleigh Park	J. Borg
Bye: Jamberoo Superoos

==== Round 3 ====
Home	Score	Away	Match information		
Home	Score	Away	Date and time	Venue	Referee
Gerringong Lions	40 – 14	Nowra-Bomaderry Jets	Saturday, 1 May, 12:00	Michael Cronin Oval	W. Cooke
Milton-Ulladulla Bulldogs	50 – 0	Mt. Warrigal United Kooris	Saturday, 1 May, 13:30	Bill Andriske Oval	E. Drury
Kiama Knights	34 – 42	Warilla-Lake South Gorillas	Sunday, 2 May, 12:00	Kiama Showground	T. Power
Stingrays of Shellharbour	60 – 6	Jamberoo Superoos	Sunday, 2 May, 12:30	Flinders Field	N. Willer
Bye: Shellharbour Sharks

==== Round 4 ====
Home	Score	Away	Match information		
Home	Score	Away	Date and time	Venue	Referee
Gerringong Lions	P – P	Jamberoo Superoos	TBC	Michael Cronin Oval	
Shellharbour Sharks	P – P	Kiama Knights	TBC	Ron Costello Oval	
Mt. Warrigal United Kooris	P – P	Stingrays of Shellharbour	TBC	Oakleigh Park	
Warilla-Lake South Gorillas	P – P	Milton-Ulladulla Bulldogs	TBC	Cec Glenholmes Oval	
Bye: Nowra-Bomaderry Jets

- All fixtures for Round 4 were postponed because of ground closures due to rainfall.

==== Round 5 ====
Home	Score	Away	Match information		
Home	Score	Away	Date and time	Venue	Referee
Jamberoo Superoos	42 – 6	Mt. Warrigal United Kooris	Saturday, 15 May, 13:30	Kevin Walsh Oval	E. Drury
Kiama Knights	F – F	Nowra-Bomaderry Jets	Sunday, 16 May, 12:00	Kiama Showground	N/A
Milton-Ulladulla Bulldogs	30 – 24	Shellharbour Sharks	Sunday, 16 May, 12:00	Bill Andriske Oval	T. Power
Stingrays of Shellharbour	54 – 0	Warilla-Lake South Gorillas	Sunday, 16 May, 12:30	Flinders Field	K. Mounfield
Bye: Gerringong Lions

- Note: The fixture between Kiama and Nowra-Bomaderry was forfeited by Kiama, therefore, Nowra-Bomaderry were awarded an automatic fifty point win.

==== Round 6 ====
Home	Score	Away	Match information		
Home	Score	Away	Date and time	Venue	Referee
Gerringong Lions	46 – 16	Shellharbour Sharks	Saturday, 22 May, 12:00	Michael Cronin Oval	E. Drury
Jamberoo Superoos	4 – 30	Milton-Ulladulla Bulldogs	Saturday, 22 May, 12:30	Kevin Walsh Oval	W. Cooke
Nowra-Bomaderry Jets	26 – 10	Stingrays of Shellharbour	Sunday, 23 May, 12:00	Shoalhaven Rugby Park	K. Mounfield
Warilla-Lake South Gorillas	34 – 12	Mt. Warrigal United Kooris	Sunday, 23 May, 12:30	Cec Glenholmes Oval	T. Power
Bye: Kiama Knights

==== Round 7 ====
Home	Score	Away	Match information		
Home	Score	Away	Date and time	Venue	Referee
Shellharbour Sharks	20 – 24	Nowra-Bomaderry Jets	Saturday, 28 May, 12:00	Ron Costello Oval	D. Chamberlain
Kiama Knights	0 – 58	Gerringong Lions	Sunday, 29 May, 12:00	Kiama Showground	B. Simon
Milton-Ulladulla Bulldogs	0 – 58	Stingrays of Shellharbour	Sunday, 29 May, 12:00	Bill Andriske Oval	K. Mounfield
Warilla-Lake South Gorillas	26 – 6	Jamberoo Superoos	Sunday, 29 May, 12:00	Cec Glenholmes Oval	E. Drury
Bye: Mt. Warrigal United Kooris

==== Round 8 ====
Home	Score	Away	Match information		
Home	Score	Away	Date and time	Venue	Referee
Jamberoo Superoos	–	Nowra-Bomaderry Jets	Thursday, 22 July, 18:00	Kevin Walsh Oval	TBC
Stingrays of Shellharbour	F – F	Kiama Knights	Sunday, 6 June, 12:00	Cec Glenholmes Oval	N/A
Milton-Ulladulla Bulldogs	6 – 46	Gerringong Lions	Sunday, 6 June, 12:00	Bill Andriske Oval	B. Simon
Mt. Warrigal United Kooris	4 – 76	Shellharbour Sharks	Sunday, 6 June, 12:30	Oakleigh Park	K. Mounfield
Bye: Warilla-Lake South Gorillas

- Note: The fixture between Stingrays of Shellharbour and Kiama was forfeitted by Kiama; therefore, Stingrays of Shellharbour were awarded an automatic fifty point win.
- Note: The fixture between Jamberoo and Nowra-Bomaderry was postponed due to players waiting for COVID-19 results after a recent outbreak.

==== Round 9 ====
Home	Score	Away	Match information		
Home	Score	Away	Date and time	Venue	Referee
Shellharbour Sharks	72 – 6	Jamberoo Superoos	Saturday, 12 June, 10:15	Ron Costello Oval	D. Chamberlain
Gerringong Lions	38 – 34	Stingrays of Shellharbour	Saturday, 12 June, 12:00	Michael Cronin Oval	B. Simon
Kiama Knights	18 – 32	Mt. Warrigal United Kooris	Saturday, 12 June, 13:30	Kiama Showground	K. Mounfield
Nowra-Bomaderry Jets	50 – 10	Warilla-Lake South Gorillas	Sunday, 13 June, 12:00	Shoalhaven Rugby Park	T. Power
Bye: Milton-Ulladulla Bulldogs

==== Round 10 ====
Home	Score	Away	Match information		
Home	Score	Away	Date and time	Venue	Referee
Jamberoo Superoos	14 – 15	Kiama Knights	Saturday, 19 June, 12:00	Kevin Walsh Oval	M. Bonnie
Warilla-Lake South Gorillas	24 – 16	Shellharbour Sharks	Sunday, 20 June, 12:00	Cec Glenholmes Oval	B. Simon
Milton-Ulladulla Bulldogs	10 – 16	Nowra-Bomaderry Jets	Sunday, 20 June, 12:00	Bill Andriske Oval	K. Mounfield
Mt. Warrigal United Kooris	4 – 70	Gerringong Lions	Sunday, 20 June, 12:30	Oakleigh Park	T. Power
Bye: Stingrays of Shellharbour

==== Round 11 ====
Home	Score	Away	Match information		
Home	Score	Away	Date and time	Venue	Referee
Gerringong Lions	66 – 6	Warilla-Lake South Gorillas	Saturday, 26 June, 12:00	Michael Cronin Oval	M. Booth
Milton-Ulladulla Bulldogs	66 – 0	Kiama Knights	Saturday, 26 June, 12:00	Bill Andriske Oval	E. Drury
Shellharbour Sharks	0 – 0	Stingrays of Shellharbour	N/A	Ron Costello Oval	N/A
Nowra-Bomaderry Jets	0 – 0	Mt. Warrigal United Kooris	N/A	Shoalhaven Rugby Park	N/A
Bye: Jamberoo Superoos

- Note: Fixtures scheduled for Sunday, 27 July were declared to be COVID draws due to the ongoing COVID-19 pandemic in Shellharbour and surrounding regions.

==== Round 12 ====
Home	Score	Away	Match information		
Home	Score	Away	Date and time	Venue	Referee
Jamberoo Superoos	0 – 0	Stingrays of Shellharbour	N/A	Kevin Walsh Oval	N/A
Warilla-Lake South Gorillas	0 – 0	Kiama Knights	N/A	Cec Glenholmes Oval	N/A
Nowra-Bomaderry Jets	0 – 0	Gerringong Lions	N/A	Shoalhaven Rugby Park	N/A
Mt. Warrigal United Kooris	0 – 0	Milton-Ulladulla Bulldogs	N/A	Oakleigh Park	N/A
Bye: Shellharbour Sharks

- Note: All Round 12 & 13 fixtures became COVID draws due to the ongoing COVID-19 pandemic in Shellharbour and surrounding regions.

==== Round 13 ====
Home	Score	Away	Match information		
Home	Score	Away	Date and time	Venue	Referee
Milton-Ulladulla Bulldogs	0 – 0	Warilla-Lake South Gorillas	N/A	Bill Andriske Oval	N/A
Kiama Knights	0 – 0	Shellharbour Sharks	N/A	Kiama Showground	N/A
Jamberoo Superoos	0 – 0	Gerringong Lions	N/A	Kevin Walsh Oval	N/A
Stingrays of Shellharbour	0 – 0	Mt. Warrigal United Kooris	N/A	Flinders Field	N/A
Bye: Nowra-Bomaderry Jets

- Note: All Round 12 & 13 fixtures became COVID draws due to the ongoing COVID-19 pandemic in Shellharbour and surrounding regions.

==== Round 14 ====
Home	Score	Away	Match information		
Home	Score	Away	Date and time	Venue	Referee
Shellharbour Sharks	C – C	Milton-Ulladulla Bulldogs	Saturday, 24 July, 12:00	Ron Costello Oval	
Mt. Warrigal United Kooris	C – C	Jamberoo Superoos	Saturday, 24 July, 12:30	Oakleigh Park	
Nowra-Bomaderry Jets	C – C	Kiama Knights	Sunday, 25 July, 12:00	Shoalhaven Rugby Park	
Warilla-Lake South Gorillas	C – C	Stingrays of Shellharbour	Sunday, 25 July, 12:00	Cec Glenholmes Oval	
Bye: Gerringong Lions

==== Round 15 ====
Home	Score	Away	Match information		
Home	Score	Away	Date and time	Venue	Referee
Milton-Ulladulla Bulldogs	C – C	Jamberoo Superoos	Saturday, 31 July, 12:00	Bill Andriske Oval	
Stingrays of Shellharbour	C – C	Nowra-Bomaderry Jets	Sunday, 1 August, 12:00	Flinders Field	
Mt. Warrigal United Kooris	C – C	Warilla-Lake South Gorillas	Sunday, 1 August, 12:30	Oakleigh Park	
Shellharbour Sharks	C – C	Gerringong Lions	Sunday, 1 August, 12:30	Ron Costello Oval	
Bye: Kiama Knights

==== Round 16 ====
Home	Score	Away	Match information		
Home	Score	Away	Date and time	Venue	Referee
Gerringong Lions	C – C	Kiama Knights	Saturday, 7 August, 11:00	Michael Cronin Oval	
Jamberoo Superoos	C – C	Warilla-Lake South Gorillas	Saturday, 7 August, 12:30	Kevin Walsh Oval	
Nowra-Bomaderry Jets	C – C	Shellharbour Sharks	Sunday, 8 August, 12:00	Shoalhaven Rugby Park	
Stingrays of Shellharbour	C – C	Milton-Ulladulla Bulldogs	Sunday, 8 August, 12:30	Flinders Field	
Bye: Mt. Warrigal United Kooris

==== Round 17 ====
Home	Score	Away	Match information		
Home	Score	Away	Date and time	Venue	Referee
Gerringong Lions	C – C	Milton-Ulladulla Bulldogs	Saturday, 14 August, 12:00	Michael Cronin Oval	
Shellharbour Sharks	C – C	Mt. Warrigal United Kooris	Saturday, 14 August, 13:30	Ron Costello Oval	
Nowra-Bomaderry Jets	C – C	Jamberoo Superoos	Sunday, 15 August, 12:00	Shoalhaven Rugby Park	
Kiama Knights	C – C	Stingrays of Shellharbour	Sunday, 15 August, 12:00	Kiama Showground	
Bye: Warilla-Lake South Gorillas

==== Round 18 ====
Home	Score	Away	Match information		
Home	Score	Away	Date and time	Venue	Referee
Mt. Warrigal United Kooris	C – C	Kiama Knights	Saturday, 21 August, 12:30	Oakleigh Park	
Jamberoo Superoos	C – C	Shellharbour Sharks	Saturday, 21 August, 12:30	Kevin Walsh Oval	
Warilla-Lake South Gorillas	C – C	Nowra-Bomaderry Jets	Sunday, 22 August, 12:00	Cec Glenholmes Oval	
Stingrays of Shellharbour	C – C	Gerringong Lions	Sunday, 22 August, 12:30	Flinders Field	
Bye: Milton-Ulladulla Bulldogs

=== Final Series ===
Qualifying/elimination finals
2
3
4
5

Minor and major semi-finals
1
2/3
2/3
4/5

Preliminary final
1/2/3
2/3/4/5

Grand final
1/2/3
1/2/3/4/5

Home	Score	Away	Match information		
Home	Score	Away	Date and time	Venue	Referee
Qualifying & elimination finals
	C – C		Saturday, 28 August, 12:00		
	C – C		Sunday, 29 August, 12:00		
Minor and major semi-finals
	C – C		Saturday, 4 September, 12:00		
	C – C		Sunday, 5 September, 12:00		
Preliminary final
	C – C		Saturday, 11 September, 12:00		
Grand final
	C – C		Sunday, 19 September, 12:00		

== Ladies League Tag Division 1 ==
2021 Group 7 Rugby League LLT1
- Duration: 10 April – 12 September
- Teams: 9
- Matches played: 21
- Points scored: 698
- Broadcast partners: Bar TV Sports
- Top points scorer(s): Ebony Murray (24 points) (as of Rd. 2)
- Top try-scorer(s): Kaarla Cowan (3 tries); Ebony Murray (as of Rd. 2)

=== Teams ===
Colours	Club	Home ground(s)	2020 position
	Albion Park-Oak Flats Eagles	Centenary Field	N/A
	Berry-Shoalhaven Heads Magpies	Berry Showground	N/A
	Gerringong Lions	Michael Cronin Oval	N/A
	Jamberoo Superoos	Kevin Walsh Oval	1st (Premiers)
	Milton-Ulladulla Bulldogs	Bill Andriske Oval	2nd (runner-ups)
	Nowra-Bomaderry Jets	Shoalhaven Rugby Park	4th
	Shellharbour Sharks	Ron Costello Oval	5th
	Stingrays of Shellharbour	Flinders Field	3rd
	Warilla-Lake South Gorillas	Cec Glenholmes Oval	N/A

=== Ladder ===
Pos	Team	Pld	W	D	L	B	PF	PA	PD	Pts
1	Milton-Ulladulla Bulldogs	10	6	3	1	2	224	76	+148	19
2	Stingrays of Shellharbour	11	6	5	0	1	180	84	+96	19
3	Jamberoo Superoos	10	5	4	1	2	180	48	+132	18
4	Albion Park-Oak Flats Eagles	11	4	4	3	1	126	142	-16	14
5	Warilla-Lake South Gorillas	10	4	1	5	2	118	122	-4	13
6	Berry-Shoalhaven Heads Magpies	11	3	4	4	1	108	116	-8	12
7	Gerringong Lions	11	3	2	6	1	86	202	-116	10
8	Shellharbour Sharks	11	2	2	7	1	84	136	-52	10
9	Nowra-Bomaderry Jets	11	0	3	8	1	40	220	-180	5

=== Season results ===
==== Round 1 ====
Home	Score	Away	Match information		
Home	Score	Away	Date and time	Venue	Referee
Gerringong Lions	10 – 4	Berry-Shoalhaven Heads Magpies	Saturday, 10 April, 11:30	Michael Cronin Oval	M. Bonnie
Albion Park-Oak Flats Eagles	20 – 20	Stingrays of Shellharbour	Saturday, 10 April, 14:30	Centenary Field	W. Lees
Nowra-Bomaderry Jets	12 – 46	Milton-Ulladulla Bulldogs	Sunday, 11 April, 11:00	Shoalhaven Rugby Park	R. Boag
Shellharbour Sharks	22 – 14	Warilla-Lake South Gorillas	Sunday, 11 April, 11:00	Ron Costello Oval	W. Lees
Bye: Jamberoo Superoos

==== Round 2 ====
Home	Score	Away	Match information		
Home	Score	Away	Date and time	Venue	Referee
Jamberoo Superoos	34 – 0	Albion Park-Oak Flats Eagles	Saturday, 17 April, 11:00	Kevin Walsh Oval	W. Lees
Berry-Shoalhaven Heads Magpies	16 – 10	Nowra-Bomaderry Jets	Saturday, 17 April, 14:00	Berry Showground	M. Bonnie
Stingrays of Shellharbour	20 – 10	Shellharbour Sharks	Sunday, 18 April, 10:00	Flinders Field	E. Drury
Warilla-Lake South Gorillas	26 – 0	Gerringong Lions	Sunday, 18 April, 11:00	Cec Glenholmes Oval	B. Simon
Bye: Milton-Ulladulla Bulldogs

==== Round 3 ====
Home	Score	Away	Match information		
Home	Score	Away	Date and time	Venue	Referee
Gerringong Lions	18 – 6	Nowra-Bomaderry Jets	Saturday, 1 May, 11:00	Michael Cronin Oval	M. Bonnie
Milton-Ulladulla Bulldogs	32 – 8	Berry-Shoalhaven Heads Magpies	Saturday, 1 May, 12:30	Bill Andriske Oval	W. Drury
Stingrays of Shellharbour	20 – 8	Jamberoo Superoos	Sunday, 2 May, 10:00	Flinders Field	K. Mounfield
Albion Park-Oak Flats Eagles	18 – 8	Shellharbour Sharks	Sunday, 2 May, 11:00	Centenary Field	R. Boag
Bye: Warilla-Lake South Gorillas

==== Round 4 ====
Home	Score	Away	Match information		
Home	Score	Away	Date and time	Venue	Referee
Gerringong Lions	P – P	Jamberoo Superoos	TBC	Michael Cronin Oval	
Berry-Shoalhaven Heads Magpies	P – P	Stingrays of Shellharbour	TBC	Berry Showground	
Warilla-Lake South Gorillas	P – P	Milton-Ulladulla Bulldogs	TBC	Cec Glenholmes Oval	
Nowra-Bomaderry Jets	P – P	Albion Park-Oak Flats Eagles	TBC	Shoalhaven Rugby Park	
Bye: Shellharbour Sharks

- All fixtures for Round 4 were postponed because of ground closures due to rainfall.

==== Round 5 ====
Home	Score	Away	Match information		
Home	Score	Away	Date and time	Venue	Referee
Jamberoo Superoos	16 – 16	Berry-Shoalhaven Heads Magpies	Saturday, 15 May, 11:00	Kevin Walsh Oval	M. Bonnie
Albion Park-Oak Flats Eagles	20 – 14	Gerringong Lions	Saturday, 15 May, 14:30	Centenary Field	D. Chamberlain
Stingrays of Shellharbour	24 – 4	Warilla-Lake South Gorillas	Sunday, 16 May, 10:00	Flinders Field	R. Boag
Milton-Ulladulla Bulldogs	12 – 8	Shellharbour Sharks	Sunday, 16 May, 11:00	Bill Andriske Oval	E. Drury
Bye: Nowra-Bomaderry Jets

==== Round 6 ====
Home	Score	Away	Match information		
Home	Score	Away	Date and time	Venue	Referee
Jamberoo Superoos	18 – 6	Milton-Ulladulla Bulldogs	Saturday, 22 May, 10:00	Kevin Walsh Oval	D. Chamberlain
Gerringong Lions	16 – 4	Shellharbour Sharks	Saturday, 22 May, 11:00	Michael Cronin Oval	B. Warren
Nowra-Bomaderry Jets	4 – 24	Stingrays of Shellharbour	Sunday, 23 May, 11:00	Shoalhaven Rugby Park	W. Lees
Warilla-Lake South Gorillas	14 – 6	Berry-Shoalhaven Heads Magpies	Sunday, 23 May, 12:30	Cec Glenholmes Oval	B. Simon
Bye: Albion Park-Oak Flats Eagles

==== Round 7 ====
Home	Score	Away	Match information		
Home	Score	Away	Date and time	Venue	Referee
Shellharbour Sharks	4 – 0	Nowra-Bomaderry Jets	Saturday, 28 May, 11:00	Ron Costello Oval	W. Lees
Berry-Shoalhaven Heads Magpies	10 – 22	Albion Park-Oak Flats Eagles	Saturday, 28 May, 14:00	Berry Showground	E. Drury
Milton-Ulladulla Bulldogs	12 – 12	Stingrays of Shellharbour	Sunday, 29 May, 11:00	Bill Andriske Oval	D. Chamberlain
Warilla-Lake South Gorillas	6 – 16	Jamberoo Superoos	Sunday, 29 May, 11:00	Cec Glenholmes Oval	R. Boag
Bye: Gerringong Lions

==== Round 8 ====
Home	Score	Away	Match information		
Home	Score	Away	Date and time	Venue	Referee
Jamberoo Superoos	F – F	Nowra-Bomaderry Jets	Saturday, 19 June, 09:30	Kevin Walsh Oval	N/A
Berry-Shoalhaven Heads Magpies	20 – 8	Shellharbour Sharks	Saturday, 5 June, 14:00	Berry Showground	K. Whittford
Milton-Ulladulla Bulldogs	46 – 4	Gerringong Lions	Sunday, 6 June, 11:00	Bill Andriske Oval	E. Drury
Warilla-Lake South Gorillas	6 – 16	Albion Park-Oak Flats Eagles	Sunday, 6 June, 12:30	Cec Glenholmes Oval	W. Lees
Bye: Stingrays of Shellharbour

- Note: The fixture between Jamberoo and Nowra-Bomaderry was forfeited by Nowra-Bomaderry; therefore, Jamberoo were awarded an automatic fifty point win.

==== Round 9 ====
Home	Score	Away	Match information		
Home	Score	Away	Date and time	Venue	Referee
Shellharbour Sharks	0 – 38	Jamberoo Superoos	Saturday, 12 June, 09:15	Ron Costello Oval	C. Spowart Lehmann
Gerringong Lions	10 – 38	Stingrays of Shellharbour	Saturday, 12 June, 11:00	Michael Cronin Oval	T. Jordan
Albion Park-Oak Flats Eagles	14 – 28	Milton-Ulladulla Bulldogs	Sunday, 13 June, 11:00	Centenary Field	R. Boag
Nowra-Bomaderry Jets	8 – 20	Warilla-Lake South Gorillas	Sunday, 13 June, 11:00	Shoalhaven Rugby Park	J. Wettengel
Bye: Berry-Shoalhaven Heads Magpies

==== Round 10 ====
Home	Score	Away	Match information		
Home	Score	Away	Date and time	Venue	Referee
Berry-Shoalhaven Heads Magpies	28 – 4	Gerringong Lions	Saturday, 19 June, 14:00	Berry Showground	W. Lees
Warilla-Lake South Gorillas	10 – 8	Shellharbour Sharks	Sunday, 20 June, 11:00	Cec Glenholmes Oval	R. Boag
Stingrays of Shellharbour	22 – 16	Albion Park-Oak Flats Eagles	Sunday, 20 June, 11:00	Flinders Field	H. Hooper
Milton-Ulladulla Bulldogs	42 – 0	Nowra-Bomaderry Jets	Sunday, 20 June, 11:00	Bill Andriske Oval	K. Whittford
Bye: Jamberoo Superoos

==== Round 11 ====
Home	Score	Away	Match information		
Home	Score	Away	Date and time	Venue	Referee
Gerringong Lions	22 – 18	Warilla-Lake South Gorillas	Saturday, 26 June, 11:00	Michael Cronin Oval	D. Chamberlain
Shellharbour Sharks	0 – 0	Stingrays of Shellharbour	N/A	Ron Costello Oval	N/A
Albion Park-Oak Flats Eagles	0 – 0	Jamberoo Superoos	N/A	Centenary Field	N/A
Nowra-Bomaderry Jets	0 – 0	Berry-Shoalhaven Heads Magpies	N/A	Shoalhaven Rugby Park	N/A
Bye: Milton-Ulladulla Bulldogs

- Note: Fixtures scheduled for Sunday, 27 July were declared to be COVID draws due to the ongoing COVID-19 pandemic in Shellharbour and surrounding regions.

==== Round 12 ====
Home	Score	Away	Match information		
Home	Score	Away	Date and time	Venue	Referee
Jamberoo Superoos	0 – 0	Stingrays of Shellharbour	N/A	Kevin Walsh Oval	N/A
Berry-Shoalhaven Heads Magpies	0 – 0	Milton-Ulladulla Bulldogs	N/A	Berry Showground	N/A
Nowra-Bomaderry Jets	0 – 0	Gerringong Lions	N/A	Shoalhaven Rugby Park	N/A
Shellharbour Sharks	0 – 0	Albion Park-Oak Flats Eagles	N/A	Ron Costello Oval	N/A
Bye: Warilla-Lake South Gorillas

- Note: All Round 12 & 13 fixtures became COVID draws due to the ongoing COVID-19 pandemic in Shellharbour and surrounding regions.

==== Round 13 ====
Home	Score	Away	Match information		
Home	Score	Away	Date and time	Venue	Referee
Jamberoo Superoos	0 – 0	Gerringong Lions	N/A	Kevin Walsh Oval	N/A
Milton-Ulladulla Bulldogs	0 – 0	Warilla-Lake South Gorillas	N/A	Bill Andriske Oval	N/A
Stingrays of Shellharbour	0 – 0	Berry-Shoalhaven Heads Magpies	N/A	Flinders Field	N/A
Albion Park-Oak Flats Eagles	0 – 0	Nowra-Bomaderry Jets	N/A	Centenary Field	N/A
Bye: Shellharbour Sharks

- Note: All Round 12 & 13 fixtures became COVID draws due to the ongoing COVID-19 pandemic in Shellharbour and surrounding regions.

==== Round 14 ====
Home	Score	Away	Match information		
Home	Score	Away	Date and time	Venue	Referee
Shellharbour Sharks	C – C	Milton-Ulladulla Bulldogs	Saturday, 24 July, 11:00	Ron Costello Oval	
Gerringong Lions	C – C	Albion Park-Oak Flats Eagles	Saturday, 24 July, 12:30	Michael Cronin Oval	
Warilla-Lake South Gorillas	C – C	Stingrays of Shellharbour	Sunday, 25 July, 11:00	Cec Glenholmes Oval	
Berry-Shoalhaven Heads Magpies	C – C	Jamberoo Superoos	Sunday, 25 July, 14:00	Berry Showground	
Bye: Nowra-Bomaderry Jets

==== Round 15 ====
Home	Score	Away	Match information		
Home	Score	Away	Date and time	Venue	Referee
Milton-Ulladulla Bulldogs	C – C	Jamberoo Superoos	Saturday, 31 July, 11:00	Bill Andriske Oval	
Berry-Shoalhaven Heads Magpies	C – C	Warilla-Lake South Gorillas	Saturday, 31 July, 14:00	Berry Showground	
Stingrays of Shellharbour	C – C	Nowra-Bomaderry Jets	Sunday, 1 August, 11:00	Flinders Field	
Shellharbour Sharks	C – C	Gerringong Lions	Sunday, 1 August, 11:30	Ron Costello Oval	
Bye: Albion Park-Oak Flats Eagles

==== Round 16 ====
Home	Score	Away	Match information		
Home	Score	Away	Date and time	Venue	Referee
Jamberoo Superoos	C – C	Warilla-Lake South Gorillas	Saturday, 7 August, 10:00	Kevin Walsh Oval	
Stingrays of Shellharbour	C – C	Milton-Ulladulla Bulldogs	Sunday, 8 August, 10:00	Flinders Field	
Nowra-Bomaderry Jets	C – C	Shellharbour Sharks	Sunday, 8 August, 11:00	Shoalhaven Rugby Park	
Albion Park-Oak Flats Eagles	C – C	Berry-Shoalhaven Heads Magpies	Sunday, 8 August, 14:00	Centenary Field	
Bye: Gerringong Lions

==== Round 17 ====
Home	Score	Away	Match information		
Home	Score	Away	Date and time	Venue	Referee
Gerringong Lions	C – C	Milton-Ulladulla Bulldogs	Saturday, 14 August, 11:00	Michael Cronin Oval	
Shellharbour Sharks	C – C	Berry-Shoalhaven Heads Magpies	Saturday, 14 August, 11:00	Ron Costello Oval	
Nowra-Bomaderry Jets	C – C	Jamberoo Superoos	Sunday, 15 August, 11:00	Shoalhaven Rugby Park	
Albion Park-Oak Flats Eagles	C – C	Warilla-Lake South Gorillas	Sunday, 15 August, 12:30	Centenary Field	
Bye: Stingrays of Shellharbour

==== Round 18 ====
Home	Score	Away	Match information		
Home	Score	Away	Date and time	Venue	Referee
Jamberoo Superoos	C – C	Shellharbour Sharks	Saturday, 21 August, 10:00	Kevin Walsh Oval	
Stingrays of Shellharbour	C – C	Gerringong Lions	Sunday, 22 August, 10:00	Flinders Field	
Warilla-Lake South Gorillas	C – C	Nowra-Bomaderry Jets	Sunday, 22 August, 11:00	Cec Glenholmes Oval	
Milton-Ulladulla Bulldogs	C – C	Albion Park-Oak Flats Eagles	Sunday, 22 August, 12:30	Bill Andriske Oval	
Bye: Berry-Shoalhaven Heads Magpies

=== Finals series ===
Minor and major semi-finals
1
2
3
4

Preliminary final
1/2
3/4

Grand final
1/2
1/2/3/4

Home	Score	Away	Match information		
Home	Score	Away	Date and time	Venue	Referee
Minor and major semi-finals
	C – C		Saturday, 28 August, 11:00		
	C – C		Sunday, 29 August, 11:00		
Preliminary final
	C – C		Sunday, 5 September, 11:00		
Grand final
	C – C		Sunday, 12 September, 11:00		

== Ladies League Tag Division 2 ==
2021 Group 7 Rugby League LLT2
- Duration: 10 April – 12 September
- Teams: 11
- Matches played: 31
- Points scored: 875
- Broadcast partners: Bar TV Sports
- Top points scorer(s): Taya Bonsall (18 points) (as of Rd. 2)
- Top try-scorer: A. Walsh (4 tries) (as of Rd. 2)

=== Teams ===
Colours	Club	Home ground(s)	2020 position
	Albion Park-Oak Flats Eagles	Centenary Field	2nd (Premiers)
	Berry-Shoalhaven Heads Magpies	Berry Showground	7th
	Gerringong Lions}}	Michael Cronin Oval}}	1st (runner-ups)}}
	Jamberoo Superoos	Kevin Walsh Oval	8th
	Kiama Knights	Kiama Showground	N/A
	Milton-Ulladulla Bulldogs	Bill Andriske Oval	9th
	Nowra-Bomaderry Jets	Shoalhaven Rugby Park	10th
	Shellharbour Sharks	Ron Costello Oval	6th
	Stingrays of Shellharbour	Flinders Field	3rd
	Warilla-Lake South Gorillas	Cec Glenholmes Oval	4th
	Wreck Bay United Bears	Francis Ryan Reserve	N/A

=== Ladder ===
Pos	Team	Pld	W	D	L	B	PF	PA	PD	Pts
1	Shellharbour Sharks	10	7	2	1	2	136	38	+98	20
2	Stingrays of Shellharbour	11	6	3	2	1	186	26	+160	17
3	Warilla-Lake South Gorillas	11	6	3	2	1	150	102	+48	17
4	Milton-Ulladulla Bulldogs	10	5	2	3	2	124	81	+42	16
5	Jamberoo Superoos	10	4	3	3	2	105	82	+23	15
6	Nowra-Bomaderry Jets	10	4	3	3	2	128	112	+16	15
7	Berry-Shoalhaven Heads Magpies	11	4	3	4	1	116	130	-14	13
8	Gerringong Lions	11	4	3	4	1	102	144	-42	13
9	Albion Park-Oak Flats Eagles	11	2	3	6	1	64	136	-72	9
10	Kiama Knights	10	1	2	7	2	62	166	-104	8
11	Wreck Bay United Bears	11	0	3	8	1	50	208	-158	5

=== Season results ===
==== Round 1 ====
Home	Score	Away	Match information		
Home	Score	Away	Date and time	Venue	Referee
Gerringong Lions	18 – 16	Berry-Shoalhaven Heads Magpies	Saturday, 10 April, 10:30	Michael Cronin Oval	B. Simon
Albion Park-Oak Flats Eagles	4 – 34	Stingrays of Shellharbour	Saturday, 10 April, 13:30	Centenary Field	W. Lees
Nowra-Bomaderry Jets	38 – 6	Wreck Bay United Bears	Sunday, 11 April, 10:00	Shoalhaven Rugby Park	R. Boag
Shellharbour Sharks	4 – 20	Warilla-Lake South Gorillas	Sunday, 11 April, 10:00	Ron Costello Oval	J. Wettengel
Kiama Knights	12 – 16	Jamberoo Superoos	Sunday, 11 April, 11:00	Kiama Showground	B. Simon
Bye: Milton-Ulladulla Bulldogs

==== Round 2 ====
Home	Score	Away	Match information		
Home	Score	Away	Date and time	Venue	Referee
Jamberoo Superoos	22 – 4	Albion Park-Oak Flats Eagles	Saturday, 17 April, 10:00	Kevin Walsh Oval	E. Drury
Wreck Bay United Bears	0 – 22	Milton-Ulladulla Bulldogs	Saturday, 17 April, 13:00	Francis Ryan Reserve	K. Thompson
Berry-Shoalhaven Heads Magpies	22 – 16	Nowra-Bomaderry Jets	Saturday, 17 April, 13:00	Berry Showground	J. Skippen
Stingrays of Shellharbour	0 – 6	Shellharbour Sharks	Sunday, 18 April, 09:00	Flinders Field	J. Wettengel
Warilla-Lake South Gorillas	28 – 24	Gerringong Lions	Sunday, 18 April, 10:00	Cec Glenholmes Oval	H. Hooper
Bye: Kiama Knights

==== Round 3 ====
Home	Score	Away	Match information		
Home	Score	Away	Date and time	Venue	Referee
Gerringong Lions	16 – 12	Wreck Bay United Bears	Saturday, 1 May, 10:00	Michael Cronin Oval	J. Wettengel
Milton-Ulladulla Bulldogs	16 – 12	Berry-Shoalhaven Heads Magpies	Saturday, 1 May, 11:30	Bill Andriske Oval	W. Drury
Stingrays of Shellharbour	32 – 0	Jamberoo Superoos	Sunday, 2 May, 09:00	Flinders Field	B. Simon
Albion Park-Oak Flats Eagles	0 – 20	Shellharbour Sharks	Sunday, 2 May, 10:00	Centenary Field	J. Commins
Kiama Knights	4 – 24	Warilla-Lake South Gorillas	Sunday, 2 May, 11:00	Kiama Showground	E. Drury
Bye: Nowra-Bomaderry Jets

==== Round 4 ====
Home	Score	Away	Match information		
Home	Score	Away	Date and time	Venue	Referee
Shellharbour Sharks	P – P	Kiama Knights	TBC	Ron Costello Oval	
Gerringong Lions	P – P	Jamberoo Superoos	TBC	Michael Cronin Oval	
Berry-Shoalhaven Heads Magpies	P – P	Wreck Bay United Bears	TBC	Berry Showground	
Warilla-Lake South Gorillas	P – P	Milton-Ulladulla Bulldogs	TBC	Cec Glenholmes Oval	
Nowra-Bomaderry Jets	P – P	Albion Park-Oak Flats Eagles	TBC	Shoalhaven Rugby Park	
Bye: Stingrays of Shellharbour

- All fixtures for Round 4 were postponed because of ground closures due to rainfall.

==== Round 5 ====
Home	Score	Away	Match information		
Home	Score	Away	Date and time	Venue	Referee
Jamberoo Superoos	6 – 20	Berry-Shoalhaven Heads Magpies	Saturday, 15 May, 10:00	Kevin Walsh Oval	W. Cooke
Albion Park-Oak Flats Eagles	12 – 16	Gerringong Lions	Saturday, 15 May, 13:30	Centenary Field	B. Warren
Stingrays of Shellharbour	6 – 12	Warilla-Lake South Gorillas	Sunday, 16 May, 09:00	Flinders Field	H. Hooper
Milton-Ulladulla Bulldogs	24 – 10	Wreck Bay United Bears	Sunday, 16 May, 10:00	Bill Andriske Oval	J. Wettengel
Kiama Knights	0 – 16	Nowra-Bomaderry Jets	Sunday, 16 May, 11:00	Kiama Showground	C. Spowart Lehmann
Bye: Shellharbour Sharks

==== Round 6 ====
Home	Score	Away	Match information		
Home	Score	Away	Date and time	Venue	Referee
Jamberoo Superoos	11 – 10	Milton-Ulladulla Bulldogs	Saturday, 22 May, 09:00	Kevin Walsh Oval	W. Drury
Gerringong Lions	6 – 26	Shellharbour Sharks	Saturday, 22 May, 10:00	Michael Cronin Oval	N. McInerney
Wreck Bay United Bears	4 – 38	Stingrays of Shellharbour	Saturday, 22 May, 13:00	Francis Ryan Reserve	G. Gaffney
Albion Park-Oak Flats Eagles	16 – 0	Kiama Knights	Sunday, 23 May, 11:00	Centenary Field	E. Drury
Warilla-Lake South Gorillas	28 – 6	Berry-Shoalhaven Heads Magpies	Sunday, 23 May, 11:30	Cec Glenholmes Oval	H. Hooper
Bye: Nowra-Bomaderry Jets

==== Round 7 ====
Home	Score	Away	Match information		
Home	Score	Away	Date and time	Venue	Referee
Shellharbour Sharks	14 – 4	Nowra-Bomaderry Jets	Saturday, 28 May, 10:00	Ron Costello Oval	M. Bonnie
Berry-Shoalhaven Heads Magpies	24 – 10	Albion Park-Oak Flats Eagles	Saturday, 28 May, 13:00	Berry Showground	P. Lees
Milton-Ulladulla Bulldogs	4 – 18	Stingrays of Shellharbour	Sunday, 29 May, 10:00	Bill Andriske Oval	D. Chamberlain
Warilla-Lake South Gorillas	12 – 10	Wreck Bay United Bears	Sunday, 29 May, 10:00	Cec Glenholmes	T. Misti
Kiama Knights	12 – 18	Gerringong Lions	Sunday, 29 May, 11:00	Kiama Showground	H. Hooper
Bye: Jamberoo Superoos

==== Round 8 ====
Home	Score	Away	Match information		
Home	Score	Away	Date and time	Venue	Referee
Jamberoo Superoos	F – F	Nowra-Bomaderry Jets	Saturday, 19 June, 08:30	Kevin Walsh Oval	N/A
Wreck Bay United Bears	0 – 0	Gerringong Lions	N/A	Francis Ryan Reserve	N/A
Berry-Shoalhaven Heads Magpies	4 – 32	Shellharbour Sharks	Saturday, 5 June, 13:00	Berry Showground	M. Bonnie
Stingrays of Shellharbour	34 – 0	Kiama Knights	Sunday, 6 June, 10:50	Flinders Field	J. Todd
Warilla-Lake South Gorillas	10 – 14	Albion Park-Oak Flats Eagles	Sunday, 6 June, 11:30	Cec Glenholmes Oval	R. Boag
Bye: Milton-Ulladulla Bulldogs

- Note: The fixture between Jamberoo and Nowra-Bomaderry was forfeitted by Nowra-Bomaderry; therefore, Jamberoo were awarded an automatic fifty point win.
- Note: The fixture between Wreck Bay United and Gerringong was declared to be a COVID draw due to a spike in COVID-19 cases in the region.

==== Round 9 ====
Home	Score	Away	Match information		
Home	Score	Away	Date and time	Venue	Referee
Shellharbour Sharks	4 – 0	Jamberoo Superoos	Friday, 11 June, 18:30	Ron Costello Oval	W. Lees
Gerringong Lions	0 – 24	Stingrays of Shellharbour	Saturday, 12 June, 10:00	Michael Cronin Oval	G. Nolan
Kiama Knights	28 – 8	Wreck Bay United Bears	Saturday, 12 June, 12:30	Kiama Showground	T. Freeman
Albion Park-Oak Flats Eagles	4 – 10	Milton-Ulladulla Bulldogs	Sunday, 13 June, 10:00	Centenary Field	H. Hooper
Nowra-Bomaderry Jets	34 – 16	Warilla-Lake South Gorillas	Sunday, 13 June, 10:00	Shoalhaven Rugby Park	J. Todd
Bye: Berry-Shoalhaven Heads Magpies

==== Round 10 ====
Home	Score	Away	Match information		
Home	Score	Away	Date and time	Venue	Referee
Wreck Bay United Bears	4 – 30	Shellharbour Sharks	Saturday, 19 June, 13:00	Francis Ryan Reserve	G. Gaffney
Berry-Shoalhaven Heads Magpies	12 – 4	Gerringong Lions	Saturday, 19 June, 13:00	Berry Showground	T. Freeman
Milton-Ulladulla Bulldogs	4 – 20	Nowra-Bomaderry Jets	Sunday, 20 June, 10:00	Bill Andriske Oval	M. Bonnie
Bye: Kiama Knights, Warilla-Lake South Gorillas, Jamberoo Superoos, Stingrays of Shellharbour, Albion Park-Oak Flats Eagles

==== Round 11 ====
Home	Score	Away	Match information		
Home	Score	Away	Date and time	Venue	Referee
Milton-Ulladulla Bulldogs	34 – 6	Kiama Knights	Saturday, 26 June, 11:00	Bill Andriske Oval	W. Drury
Shellharbour Sharks	0 – 0	Stingrays of Shellharbour	N/A	Ron Costello Oval	N/A
Albion Park-Oak Flats Eagles	0 – 0	Jamberoo Superoos	N/A	Centenary Field	N/A
Nowra-Bomaderry Jets	0 – 0	Berry-Shoalhaven Heads Magpies	N/A	Shoalhaven Rugby Park	N/A
Wreck Bay United Bears	0 – 0	Warilla-Lake South Gorillas	N/A	Francis Ryan Reserve	N/A
Bye: Gerringong Lions

- Note: Fixtures scheduled for Sunday, 27 July were declared to be COVID draws due to the ongoing COVID-19 pandemic in Shellharbour and surrounding regions.

==== Round 12 ====
Home	Score	Away	Match information		
Home	Score	Away	Date and time	Venue	Referee
Jamberoo Superoos	0 – 0	Stingrays of Shellharbour	N/A	Kevin Walsh Oval	N/A
Wreck Bay United Bears	0 – 0	Albion Park-Oak Flats Eagles	N/A	Francis Ryan Reserve	N/A
Berry-Shoalhaven Heads Magpies	0 – 0	Milton-Ulladulla Bulldogs	N/A	Berry Showground	N/A
Nowra-Bomaderry Jets	0 – 0	Gerringong Lions	N/A	Shoalhaven Rugby Park	N/A
Warilla-Lake South Gorillas	0 – 0	Kiama Knights	N/A	Cec Glenholmes Oval	N/A
Bye: Shellharbour Sharks

- Note: All Round 12 & 13 fixtures became COVID draws due to the ongoing COVID-19 pandemic in Shellharbour and surrounding regions.

==== Round 13 ====
Home	Score	Away	Match information		
Home	Score	Away	Date and time	Venue	Referee
Jamberoo Superoos	0 – 0	Gerringong Lions	N/A	Kevin Walsh Oval	N/A
Milton-Ulladulla Bulldogs	0 – 0	Warilla-Lake South Gorillas	N/A	Bill Andriske Oval	N/A
Kiama Knights	0 – 0	Shellharbour Sharks	N/A	Kiama Showground	N/A
Stingrays of Shellharbour	0 – 0	Berry-Shoalhaven Heads Magpies	N/A	Flinders Field	N/A
Albion Park-Oak Flats Eagles	0 – 0	Nowra-Bomaderry Jets	N/A	Centenary Field	N/A
Bye: Wreck Bay United Bears

- Note: All Round 12 & 13 fixtures became COVID draws due to the ongoing COVID-19 pandemic in Shellharbour and surrounding regions.

==== Round 14 ====
Home	Score	Away	Match information		
Home	Score	Away	Date and time	Venue	Referee
Shellharbour Sharks	C – C	Milton-Ulladulla Bulldogs	Saturday, 24 July, 10:00	Ron Costello Oval	
Gerringong Lions	C – C	Albion Park-Oak Flats Eagles	Saturday, 24 July, 11:30	Michael Cronin Oval	
Wreck Bay United Bears	C – C	Jamberoo Superoos	Saturday, 24 July, 13:00	Francis Ryan Reserve	
Warilla-Lake South Gorillas	C – C	Stingrays of Shellharbour	Sunday, 25 July, 10:00	Cec Glenholmes Oval	
Nowra-Bomaderry Jets	C – C	Kiama Knights	Sunday, 25 July, 11:00	Shoalhaven Rugby Park	
Bye: Berry-Shoalhaven Heads Magpies

==== Round 15 ====
Home	Score	Away	Match information		
Home	Score	Away	Date and time	Venue	Referee
Milton-Ulladulla Bulldogs	C – C	Jamberoo Superoos	Saturday, 31 July, 10:00	Bill Andriske Oval	
Berry-Shoalhaven Heads Magpies	C – C	Warilla-Lake South Gorillas	Saturday, 31 July, 13:00	Berry Showground	
Shellharbour Sharks	C – C	Wreck Bay United Bears	Sunday, 1 August, 09:00	Ron Costello Oval	
Stingrays of Shellharbour	C – C	Nowra-Bomaderry Jets	Sunday, 1 August, 10:00	Flinders Field	
Kiama Knights	C – C	Albion Park-Oak Flats Eagles	Sunday, 1 August, 12:30	Kiama Showground	
Bye: Gerringong Lions

==== Round 16 ====
Home	Score	Away	Match information		
Home	Score	Away	Date and time	Venue	Referee
Jamberoo Superoos	C – C	Warilla-Lake South Gorillas	Saturday, 7 August, 09:00	Kevin Walsh Oval	
Gerringong Lions	C – C	Kiama Knights	Saturday, 7 August, 10:00	Michael Cronin Oval	
Wreck Bay United Bears	C – C	Berry-Shoalhaven Heads Magpies	Saturday, 7 August, 13:00	Francis Ryan Reserve	
Stingrays of Shellharbour	C – C	Milton-Ulladulla Bulldogs	Sunday, 8 August, 09:00	Flinders Field	
Nowra-Bomaderry Jets	C – C	Shellharbour Sharks	Sunday, 8 August, 10:00	Shoalhaven Rugby Park	
Bye: Albion Park-Oak Flats Eagles

==== Round 17 ====
Home	Score	Away	Match information		
Home	Score	Away	Date and time	Venue	Referee
Gerringong Lions	C – C	Milton-Ulladulla Bulldogs	Saturday, 14 August, 10:00	Michael Cronin Oval	
Shellharbour Sharks	C – C	Berry-Shoalhaven Heads Magpies	Saturday, 14 August, 10:00	Ron Costello Oval	
Nowra-Bomaderry Jets	C – C	Jamberoo Superoos	Sunday, 15 August, 10:00	Shoalhaven Rugby Park	
Albion Park-Oak Flats Eagles	C – C	Wreck Bay United Bears	Sunday, 15 August, 10:00	Centenary Field	
Kiama Knights	C – C	Stingrays of Shellharbour	Sunday, 15 August, 11:00	Kiama Showground	
Bye: Warilla-Lake South Gorillas

==== Round 18 ====
Home	Score	Away	Match information		
Home	Score	Away	Date and time	Venue	Referee
Jamberoo Superoos	C – C	Shellharbour Sharks	Saturday, 21 August, 09:00	Kevin Walsh Oval	
Stingrays of Shellharbour	C – C	Gerringong Lions	Sunday, 22 August, 09:00	Flinders Field	
Warilla-Lake South Gorillas	C – C	Nowra-Bomaderry Jets	Sunday, 22 August, 10:00	Cec Glenholmes Oval	
Milton-Ulladulla Bulldogs	C – C	Albion Park-Oak Flats Eagles	Sunday, 22 August, 11:30	Bill Andriske Oval	
Berry-Shoalhaven Heads Magpies	C – C	Kiama Knights	Sunday, 22 August, 14:00	Berry Showground	
Bye: Wreck Bay United Bears

=== Finals series ===
Minor and major semi-finals
1
2
3
4

Preliminary final
1/2
3/4

Grand final
1/2
1/2/3/4

Home	Score	Away	Match information		
Home	Score	Away	Date and time	Venue	Referee
Minor and major semi-finals
	C – C		Saturday, 28 August, 11:00		
	C – C		Sunday, 29 August, 11:00		
Preliminary final
	C – C		Sunday, 5 September, 11:00		
Grand final
	C – C		Sunday, 12 September, 11:00		
