= Warilla-Lake South Gorillas =

Australian rugby league club, based in Lake Illawarra, NSW

Warilla Gorillas

Club information
- Full name: Warilla-Lake South Rugby League Football Club
- Nickname: The Gorillas
- Colours: Gold; Blue
- Founded: 1965; 61 years ago

Current details
- Ground: Cec Glenholmes Oval (Hooker Park), Lake Illawarra, New South Wales
- Competition: Group 7 Rugby League

Records
- Premierships: 9 (1978, 1980, 1982, 1984, 1991, 1995, 1997, 2011, 2022)
- Runners-up: 11 (1981, 1986, 1992, 1994, 1998, 2009, 2010, 2013, 2014, 2016, 2020)
- Minor premierships: 9 (1980, 1982, 1992, 1994, 1997, 1998, 2009, 2011, 2014)

The Warilla-Lake South Gorillas (or sometimes simplified to Warilla Gorillas) are an Australian rugby league football team based in Lake Illawarra, a coastal town of the Illawarra region. The club is a part of Country Rugby League and have competed in the South Coast first grade competition since 1970. The club's greatest achievement to date is winning the Clayton Cup in 1982.

== History ==
The very first team to play for Warilla was an under-9's side in the Illawarra competition in 1964. On the back of this, in 1965, Warilla successfully split from Shellharbour-Lake Illawarra to form their own club known as Warilla. The club fielded an under-18s squad that year entered their inaugural grade team in reserves in 1966. In 1969, the club took its first step into first grade, as well as fielding a third grade side for the first time.

The Gorillas won their first premiership in 1978. Their success continued winning three more first grade grand finals in the 80's and again in the 90's. The turn of the century wasn't as fruitful for the club winning no first grade titles, although they participated in a few finals. Notably, the Gorillas lost two consecutive grand finals, in 2009 to the Albion Park-Oak Flats Eagles and in 2010 to the Gerringong Lions.

In 2011 Warilla ended their 14-year premiership drought by defeating the Gerringong Lions 36–6. Prop Alex Volkanovski was named man of the match in his final game for the Gorillas before embarking on his UFC career. Since the Gorillas grand final win in 2011 they appeared in three losing grand finals, 2013 to the Gerringong Lions, 2014 to the Nowra-Bomaderry Jets and in 2016 to the Gerringong Lions.

In 2020, the Gorillas and the Lions rivalry continued in the 2020 grand final. Gerringong won this encounter 20-6 which featured Tyran Wishart who would go on and play in the NRL. In 2022, the Gorillas would have there revenge against the Lions winning their 9 premiership with a 16-14 win.

The Gorillas did not enter a first-grade team in 2025. This was the first time they did not feature in first grade side since their inception into the Group 7 Rugby League competition in 1969.

=== Colours ===
The team's colours are gold and blue.

== Notable Juniors ==
Notable First Grade Players that have played at Warilla-Lake South Gorillas include:

- David Boyle (1982-1991) South Sydney and New South Wales representative.
- Beau Henry (2011-2014) Newcastle Knights & Gold Coast Titans)
- Alexander Volkanovski – Current UFC Featherweight Champion

== Honours ==
=== Team ===
- Group 7 Rugby League Premierships: 9

1978, 1980, 1982, 1984, 1991, 1995, 1997, 2011, 2022

- First Grade Minor Premierships: 9

1980, 1982, 1992, 1994, 1997, 1998, 2009, 2011, 2014

- Second Grade Premierships: 8

1987, 1988, 1991, 1992, 1994, 2007, 2010, 2013

- Third Grade Premierships (Regan Cup): 3

1975, 1976, 1983

- U-18's Premierships: 11

1968, 1970, 1974, 1986, 1988, 1989, 1991, 1998, 2001, 2019, 2023

- Club Championships: 11

1972, 1978, 1980, 1982, 1983, 1986, 1987, 1988, 1991, 1992, 2009

- Clayton Cup: 1

1982

=== Individuals ===
- Michael Cronin Medal: 7

Greg Hooper (1990 & 1996), Mark Payer (1992), Neil Farmilo (1997), Damien Paulissen (2008), Alex Volkanovski (2010), Daniel Burke (2019)

- Group 7 Player of the Year: 10

Ron Warren (1978), Brian Love (1980), Merv Veitch (1982), Tommy Fowler (1984 & 1986), Neil Farmilo (1992 & 1997), Brade Miller (1994), Damien Paulissen (2008), Jake Brisbane (2022)

- Rookie of the Year: 6

Peter Duffy (1985), Paul Veitch (1978), Wayne Marsh (1984), Mark Westaway (1985), Mark Walsh (2005), Tyson Brown (2009)

- Leading Point-scorer of the Year: 4

Neil Street (1980), David Moffat (1982), Rod Roach (1987), Liam Watson (2002)

- Leading Try-scorer of the Year: 7

Tommy Denniss (1980 & 1981), Richard Harvey (1984), Neil Farmilo (1987), Aaron Henry (2015), Justin Jones (2022 & 2023)

- Kevin Walsh Scholarship: 6

Tom Denniss (1980), Paul Veitch (1984), Richard Finter (1985), Glen Southwell (1987), Peter Hooper (1989), Daniel Castelli (1991)

- Under-18s Player of the Year: 8

Mark Westaway (1984), Darren Davison (1986), Jason Hughes (1987), Gary Pabis (1988), Darren O'Sullivan (1991), Chris Henry (2000), Sam Hooper (2019) Dreau Clark (2023)

- Under-21s Player of the Year: 2

Clint Poole (1992), Travis Munro (1995)
