= Adam Docker =

Adam Docker may refer to:

- Adam Docker (footballer) (born 1985), English-Pakistani footballer
- Adam Docker (rugby league) (born 1991), Australian rugby league footballer
