= Ashton Ward =

Australian rugby league footballer

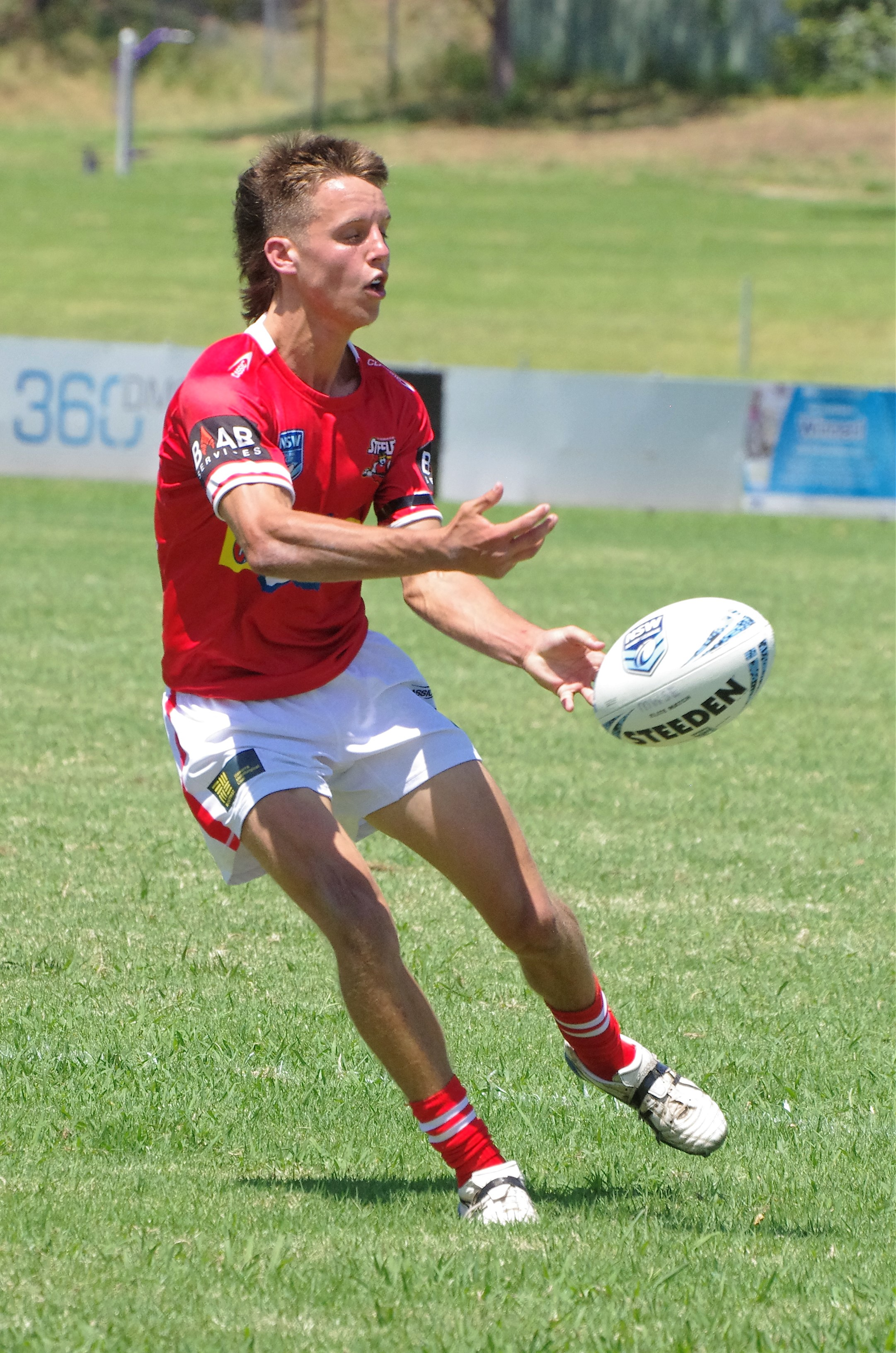

Personal information
- Full name: Ashton Ward
- Born: 7 February 2004 (age 22) Wollongong, New South Wales, Australia
- Height: 183 cm (6 ft 0 in)
- Weight: 74 kg (11 st 9 lb)

Playing information
- Position: Five-eighth, Halfback
Club
Years	Team	Pld	T	G	FG	P
2025–	South Sydney	19	2	17	0	42
- Source: As of 6 November 2026

Ashton Ward (born 7 February 2004) is an Australian professional rugby league footballer who plays as a five-eighth or halfback for the South Sydney Rabbitohs in the National Rugby League.

== Background ==
Ward was born in Wollongong, New South Wales, and played his junior rugby league for the Gerringong Lions.

== Playing career ==
=== St George Illawarra Dragons ===
Ward featured in the Jersey Flegg Cup for the St. George Illawarra Dragons before moving to South Sydney. He claimed St. George's Jersey Flegg Player of the Year award in 2024, topping the competition in points (10 tries, 72 goals).

=== South Sydney Rabbitohs ===
Ward was named in South Sydney's development pathways squads for Jersey Flegg Cup and was contracted to take part in full-time NRL pre-season training in 2025.

He impressed in the 2025 pre-season, featuring strongly in a trial match against the Manly Warringah Sea Eagles.

Ward earned his first-grade debut off the interchange bench in Round 21 of the 2025 NRL season against the Cronulla‑Sutherland Sharks at Polytec Stadium in Gosford, coming on in the 58th minute of a 12–14 loss. Ward played six games for South Sydney in the 2025 NRL season which saw the club finish 14th on the table. On 23 October, South Sydney announced seven re-signings with Ward extending his contract for a further year.

On 14 July 2026, South Sydney announced that Ward's contract was upgraded and promoted into the squad's top 30. He re-signed with the club for a further two years. Ward played 13 matches for South Sydney in the 2026 NRL season as the club finished 6th on the table and qualified for the finals.
