= Gerringong Lions =

Australian rugby league club, based in Gerringong, NSW

Club information
- Full name: Gerringong Rugby League Football Club
- Nickname: The Lions
- Colours: Blue; Red; White
- Founded: 1914; 112 years ago

Current details
- Ground: Michael Cronin Oval
- Coach: Scott Stewart
- Competition: Group 7 Rugby League

Records
- Premierships: 23 (1914, 1918, 1920, 1921, 1922, 1924, (1925 *IRL), 1940, 1956, 1960, 1965, 1968, 1970, 1972, 1990, 1994, 2010, 2013, 2015, 2016, 2020, 2023, 2024)
- Runners-up: 17 (1915, 1923, 1928, 1929, 1936, 1949, 1952, 1971, 1973, 1975, 1987, 1988, 1989, 2003, 2011, 2012, 2022)
- Minor premierships: 15 (1914, 1921, 1929, 1940, 1949, 1956, 1968, 1971, 1972, 1975, 1987, 2013, 2016, 2020, 2022)

The Gerringong Lions are an Australian rugby league football team based in Gerringong, a coastal town of the Illawarra and South Coast regions. The club was formed in 1914 as one of the founding members of South Coast Rugby League, and continue to participate in the Group 7 competition.

== History ==
=== Early Years (1914–1924) ===
The Gerringong Lions Rugby League Football Club was born when they broke away from South Coast Rugby Union in 1913 - a competition where they had won 6 First Grade Titles. On 30 May 1914 Gerringong travelled to the Kiama Showground to face closest neighbours and soon to be biggest rivals, Kiama.

The opening round of the inaugural season would see the Lions lost the match 6–3. Gerringong, however, would go on to take out the premiership final with an 11–10 victory at the Kiama Showground, a match that would charge a sixpence to attend.

=== Entering Illawarra (1925–1927) ===
After winning the South Coast Rugby League title again in 1924 for the 6th time (out of 8 years running), the Lions decided to move onto the more skilled Illawarra Rugby League in 1925. In their first season in this year they won the premiership.

The journey into the Illawarra would only last a total of three years when the Lions returned to South Coast Rugby League Competition in 1928.

=== Re-entry into South Coast (1928–present) ===
The Lions re-entered the South Coast competition in 1928, but did not enjoy the same success they had before they left. In fact, the club had to wait another 12 years before winning the premiership again in 1940.

Gerringong has won more premierships than any other side in Group 7 history with 20, with 4 premierships in the decade starting in 2010, which was won with a spectacular late field goal to Pat Cronin, defeating Warilla-Lake South Gorillas 21–20.

Gerringong made the grand final four years in a row from 2010 to 2013, losing to Warilla in 2011 and Albion Park in 2012, before success in 2013 that saw Brad Davidson kick a field goal with four seconds remaining in regular time to even the score 13-13 and saw Davidson kick another field goal in extra time for Gerringong to take out the premiership in a thrilling victory. Back to back premierships in 2015 and 2016 were followed by premierships in 2020 and 2023-2024.

=== Colours ===
The colours used by the Gerringong side are blue, red and white.

=== Home ground ===
The Gerringong Lions play out of Michael Cronin Oval, Blackwood Street Gerringong.

== Players ==
=== Notable former players ===
Notable First Grade Players that have played at Gerringong Lions include:

- Paul Quinn – Australian representative (7 tests between 1963 and 1965), Newtown Jets
- Michael Cronin Australian representative (1977–86 Parramatta Eels)
- Ron Quinn (1983–88 Parramatta Eels & Cronulla Sharks)
- Rod Wishart Australian representative (1989–99 Illawarra Steelers & St. George Illawarra Dragons)
- Ashton Sims (2002–19 St. George Illawarra Dragons, Brisbane Broncos, North Queensland Cowboys, Warrington Wolves, Toronto Wolfpack).
- Tariq Sims (2011–present North Queensland Cowboys, Newcastle Knights, Dragons & Melbourne Storm)
- Korbin Sims (2013–present Newcastle Knights, St. George Illawarra Dragons)
- Reuben Garrick (2019–present Manly Sea Eagles)
- Jackson Ford (2019–present St. George Illawarra Dragons & New Zealand Warriors)
- Tyran Wishart (2022–present Melbourne Storm)
- Hayden Buchanan (2024-present St. George Illawarra Dragons)
- Hamish Stewart (2025–present St. George Illawarra Dragons)
- Dylan Egan (2025-present St. George Illawarra Dragons)
- Ashton Ward (2025-present South Sydney Rabbitohs)

== Honours ==
- 'Group 7 Rugby League Premierships: 22

1914, 1918, 1920, 1921, 1922, 1924, 1940, 1956, 1960, 1965, 1968, 1970, 1972, 1990, 1994, 2010, 2013, 2015, 2016, 2020, 2023,2024

- Illawarra Rugby League: 1

1925

- 'Group 7 Rugby League Runners-Up: 17

1915, 1923, 1928, 1929, 1936, 1949, 1952, 1971, 1973, 1975, 1987, 1988, 1989, 2003,2011,2012,2022

- First Grade Minor Premierships: 14

1914, 1921, 1929, 1940, 1949, 1956, 1968, 1971, 1972, 1975, 1987, 2013, 2016,2022

- Second Grade Premierships: 5

1995, 2002, 2011, 2023,2024

- U-18's Premierships: 7

1938, 1940, 1951, 1994, 2000, 2010, 2022

- Third Grade (Regan Cup): 1

1973

Source: About the Lions
