= Adam Docker (rugby league) =

Australian rugby league footballer

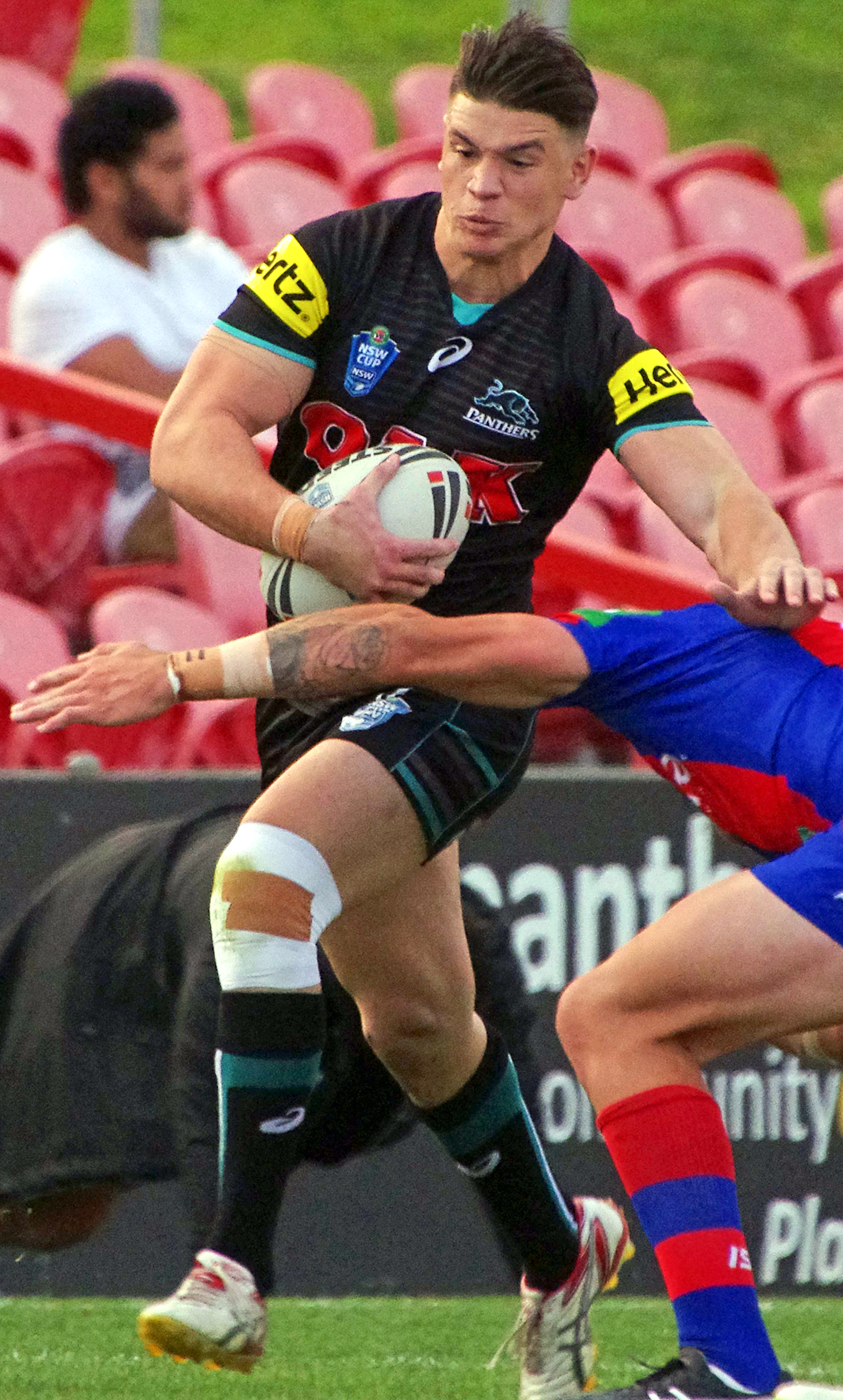

Personal information
- Born: 24 January 1991 (age 35) Shellharbour, New South Wales, Australia

Playing information
- Height: 184 cm (6 ft 0 in)
- Weight: 96 kg (15 st 2 lb)
- Position: Lock, Second-row
Club
Years	Team	Pld	T	G	FG	P
2012–15	Penrith Panthers	42	2	0	0	8
Representative
Years	Team	Pld	T	G	FG	P
2014	NSW Country	1	0	0	0	0

Adam Docker (born 24 January 1991) is an Australian former professional rugby league footballer. He played for the Penrith Panthers in the National Rugby League as a lock and second-row.

== Background ==
Born in Shellharbour, New South Wales, Docker played his junior rugby league for the Shellharbour Sharks, before being signed by the St. George Illawarra Dragons.

== Playing career ==
=== Early career ===
In 2010 and 2011, Docker played for the St. George Illawarra Dragons' NYC team, scoring 2 tries in 14 games.

=== 2012 ===
In 2012, Docker joined the Penrith Panthers, playing with their New South Wales Cup team, Windsor Wolves, for most of the year. In Round 24 of the 2012 NRL season, he made his NRL debut for Penrith in their 18–16 win over the New Zealand Warriors at Mount Smart Stadium.

=== 2014 ===
On 4 May, Docker played for New South Wales Country against New South Wales City in the 2014 City vs Country Origin match. On 29 September, he was named in the Australian train-on squad for the 2014 Rugby League Four Nations.

=== 2015 ===
In January 2015, Docker attended the Emerging Origin Blues squad designed for possible future New South Wales State of Origin representatives. After managing to only play one game in the 2015 season, he was forced to retire at the end of the season due to no cartilage left in his left knee leaving him with high grade arthritis.

== Personal life ==
In 2011, Docker was placed into an induced coma after arriving at St George Hospital's Intensive Care Unit following a bashing on the streets of Cronulla by a gang of teenagers.
