= Kiama Showground =

Sports and entertainment complex in Australia

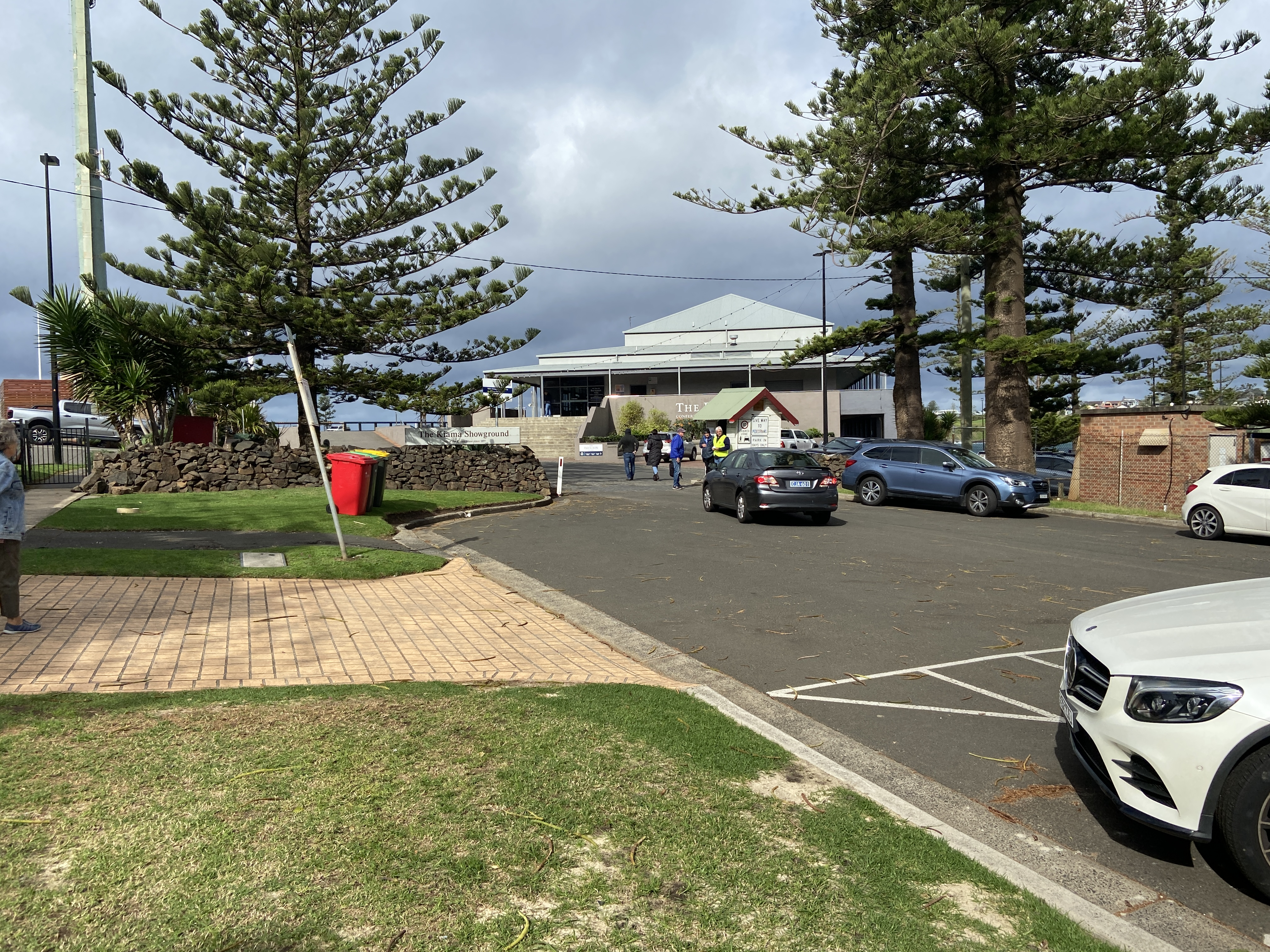
- Entrance to Kiama Showground, May 2025
- Interactive map of Kiama Showground
- Location: Bong Bong Street, Kiama, New South Wales 2533
- Coordinates: 34.674476°S 150.857906°E
- Owner: The Crown
- Operator: Kiama Municipal Council
- Surface: Grass

Construction
- Opened: 26 August 1908

Tenants
- Kiama Knights; Kiama Rugby Union Club; Kiama Touch Association

The Kiama Showground is a sports and entertainment complex of the South Coast-Illawarra region in the coastal town of Kiama. The complex includes two ovals, the Showring and Chittick Oval. The showground is the host site of the Kiama Show which has operated for more than a hundred years. The show is held in late January each year (around Australia Day) and run by one of the five oldest Agricultural Show Societies in Australia. The showground's pavilion is the only community hall in Kiama. The pavilion and grandstand at the Kiama Showground has undergone a major re-development which was publicly opened by NSW governor Marie Bashir in August 2009. Kiama Showground is also the home ground to Group 7 Rugby League side, the Kiama Knights, a club where international players Shaun Timmins, Brett and Josh Morris learnt their trade. Kiama Rugby Union Club also plays its home games out of Kiama Showground. Kiama Touch Association also uses the ground for competition. As a part of Crown land, the surface is open to public, and many schools in the area also use the ground for sports events. The ground and pavilion are also used for various other concerts and special events. The pavilion itself can even be booked for corporate events, wedding receptions, conferences or other special functions, with facilities catering for 180 dining guests and a theatre setup for 330 people in the main Norfolk room. Smaller rooms, Saddlback room and Surf Beach room seat 80 people combined (or 40 each as separate rooms), as well as the Kendall room seating a further 35 patrons.

One of the other major events to be hosted at Kiama Showground is the Kiama Rugby Sevens tournament, which is generally held in late February and is used by New South Wales Country Rugby Union and Australian Rugby Union as trials for future representative rugby sevens teams. Clubs from Illawarra Rugby Union and Tooheys New Cup gain invitation to the event as well as several other clubs from country, interstate, and the city. There have even been entrants from Tonga. The entries are restricted to 48 teams and prizemoney is worth A$20,000.
