= Shellharbour Sharks =

Australian rugby league club, based in Wollongong, NSW

Shellharbour City Sharks RLFC

Club information
- Full name: Shellharbour City Sharks RLFC
- Colours: Maroon; Gold
- Founded: 1920; 106 years ago

Current details
- Ground: Ron Costello Oval
- Chairman: Allan Cody
- Coach: Abed Atallah
- Captain: James Ralphs

Records
- Premierships: 6 (1939, 1962, 1971, 1973, 2001, 2018)

The Shellharbour City Sharks are a Country Rugby League club founded in 1920 located on the South Coast of NSW that compete in the South Coast Group 7 competition.

== Club Info ==
=== History ===
Shellharbour City RLFC has a 113-year history, originally existed as a rugby union club, before switching to rugby league in 1920.

The club have won five first-grade premierships in total, as well as over 30 reserve, third, and under-18 premierships. The club's inaugural first grade premiership was in 1939. The last premiership was won in 2018.

The Shellharbour LGA itself forms the southern part of the Greater Wollongong urban area.

=== Shellharbour City Marlins/Dragons ===
In 2007, Shellharbour City struck a deal with NRL side the St. George Illawarra Dragons and thus created a new team and entered themselves into the NSWRL Jim Beam Cup with the name Shellharbour City Marlins using the colours as their parent club. It is rumoured that the name Marlins was chosen to differentiate themselves from any Cronulla Sharks sides. The Shellharbour Sharks still competed in Group 7 Rugby League competition during this time. During 2008, the Dragons leagues club however did not give the same backing to Sharks, instead the Sharks stayed alive through other sponsorship deals, most notably Corban KIA. 2009 saw a change in direction again with both the Sharks side moving into the Illawarra Carlton League and the Marlins side moving into the NSW Cup. This resulted in the Marlins changing their name to Shellharbour City Dragons and consequently changing their strip to the more famous Red-V.

The club moved back to Group 7 from the Illawarra League in 2014.

=== Ron Costello Oval ===
Ron Costello Oval (formally Fuller Park) has been the home of Shellharbour City Rugby League Football Club since the mid-1950s.

== Notable Juniors ==
- Ron Costello – Wests, Canterbury, NSW, and Australian Kangaroo. The club's home ground, Ron Costello Oval, is named after him.
- Luke Bailey – St George Illawarra, Gold Coast captain, NSW and Australian front row forward.
- Matt Cooper – St George Illawarra, NSW, and Australian centre
- Dan Hunt – St George Illawarra and Country prop.
- Trent Merrin – St George Illawarra, Country, NSW and Australian Lock.
- Adam Docker – Penrith Panthers
- Euan Aitken – St George Illawarra
- Jai Field – St George Illawarra

== Honours ==
- Group 7 Rugby League Premierships: 6

1939, 1962, 1971, 1973, 2001, 2018

- Second Grade Premierships: 14

1959, 1962, 1963, 1964, 1965, 1971, 1973, 1975, 1983, 1990, 2001, 2003, 2004, 2005, 2006

- Third Grade Premierships: 2

1971, 1977

- Group 7 U-18's Premierships: 11

1944, 1957, 1959, 1960, 1961, 1963, 1964, 2003, 2007, 2008, 2020

- Illawarra U-18's Premierships: 3

2009, 2010, 2012
