= Albion Park-Oak Flats Eagles =

Australian rugby league club, based in Albion Park, NSW

Club information
- Full name: Albion Park-Oak Flats Rugby League Football Club
- Nickname: The Eagles
- Colours: Maroon; White
- Founded: 1914; 112 years ago

Current details
- Ground: Centenary Field, Croom Regional Sporting Complex, Albion Park, New South Wales (5,000-10,000)
- Coach: Josh White & Jason Hooper
- Competition: Group 7 Rugby League

Records
- Premierships: 13 (1944, 1949, 1963, 1964, 1975, 1998, 1999, 2000, 2003, 2006, 2007, 2009, 2012)
- Runners-up: 5 (1962, 1965, 1974, 1976, 2005)
- Minor premierships: 10 (1963, 1976, 1999, 2000, 2003, 2005, 2006, 2007, 2010, 2012)

The Albion Park-Oak Flats Eagles are an Australian rugby league football team based in Albion Park, a country town of the Illawarra region. The club are a part of Country Rugby League and have competed in both the Illawarra and South Coast competitions, where it competes today. The club's greatest achievement to date is winning the Clayton Cup in 2007.

== History ==
Originally the team was known as Albion Park until 1964, before the team expanded to Oak Flats thus changing their name to Albion Park-Oak Flats. The team won two premierships before this time, the first in 1944 and the second in 1949. The Eagles were originally members of South Coast Rugby League before switching to the Illawarra District League in the 1920s where the remained until its return to the South Coast in 1933.

After a slow start to the 20th century, they finished off with a bang winning the 1998 and 1999 First Grade Premierships. They brought this strength into the 21st century winning a third consecutive premiership in 2000. They remained one of the strongest team in the South Coast throughout the 2000s, appearing in six grand finals and winning the Clayton Cup in 2007.

=== 2024 Biggest Signings ===
- Lachlan Murphy: 2024 marked the start of the ‘Lachlan Murphy’ Era. With plans of taking the reins of 1st grade post playing career, Murphy put pen to paper signing a high valued NSWRL contract with the club. The club has plans to re-name the clubs best and fairest accolade the ‘Lachlan Murphy Trophy’ with plans of also naming scoreboard and western hill after the cult hero.
- Jake ‘Hornet’ Hollingsworth: After adapting his craft from a classical back rower to a meat pie eating (on and off field) front rower, the hornet has risen through the ranks of Albion Park. Look out for the hips throughout 2024, the Hornet has arrived.
- Benny Warner: After knocking back a lucrative deal at the Stingrays, BENNY IS BACK BABY. We all know he got kicked out of the club in 2022, and cost the club arguably one of the clubs best forwards in Tommy Warner, Benny is back with redemption ready to re-write the history books. Unfortunately the club offered his brother Joey ‘Big Red’ Warner a contract, but he opted not to put pen to paper.

=== Name and Emblem ===
The Eagles logo is adapted from that of NRL and NSWRL side Manly-Warringah Sea Eagles.

=== Colours ===
The team's colours are Maroon and White, again similar to that of the Manly Sea Eagles

== Notable Juniors ==
- Jason Hooper (1997–2007 Illawarra Steelers, St George Illawarra Dragons & St. Helens)
- Aaron Gorrell (2002–09 St George Illawarra Dragons, Catalans Dragons & Brisbane Broncos)
- Joe Vickery (2013– Leeds Rhinos & Wakefield Trinity Wildcats)
- Drew Hutchison (2015– St George Illawarra Dragons)
- Benny Warner (2008– Cootamundra Bulldogs, Yenda Blue Heelers, Wagga Wagga Brothers, Yass Magpies & Tumut Blues)
- Adam Clune (2020– St George Illawarra Dragons)
- Dylan Lucas (2023– Newcastle Knights)
- Lachlan Murphy 2017–current

Current accolades include:

- committee member of the year
- 3 time team man of the year
- 2 time Halfback of the year
- 2 time front rower of the year
- most tries scored in a year (37)
- most points scored in a year (346)

== Honours ==
=== Team ===
- Group 7 Rugby League Premierships: 13

1944, 1949, 1963, 1964, 1975, 1998, 1999, 2000, 2003, 2006, 2007, 2009, 2012

- First Grade Minor Premierships: 10

1963, 1976, 1999, 2000, 2003, 2005, 2006, 2007, 2010, 2012

- Second Grade Premierships: 8

1938*, 1966, 1976, 1997, 1998, 1999, 2008, 2019

- U-18's Premierships: 8

1954, 1966, 1978, 1984, 1990, 1999, 2012, 2018, 2024

- Leo O'Dwyer Cups: 4

1963, 1968, 1969, 1975, 2000

- Third Grade Premierships (Regan Cup): 4

1974, 1981, 1985, 1991

- Club Championships: 7

1975, 1984, 1985, 1997, 1998, 2006, 2007

- Clayton Cup: 1

2007

=== Individuals ===
- Group 7 Player of the Year (5)

John Marley (1969), Jade Lucas (2000), Simon Pimanovs (2005 & 2007), Derek "Spud" Gray (2008)

- Highest Point-scorer of the Year (2)

David Jensen (2000), Sean Jenkins (2007)

- Highest Try-scorer of the Year (6)

Ralph Clarke (1987), Cole Skelly (1995), Mick Gillespie (1999), Simon Pimanovs (2000 & 2007), Sean Jenkins (2007), Danny Sartori (2009)

- Rookie of the Year (2)

Craig Nicholls (1993), Sean Jenkins (2001)

- Kevin Walsh Scholarship (1)

Jacob Boon (2006)

- Under-18s Player of the Year (2)

Cole Skelly (1989), Ian Jones (1990)

- Under-21s Player of the Year (2)

Cole Skelly (1990), Ian Jones (1991)
