= Jack Murchie =

Australian rugby league footballer

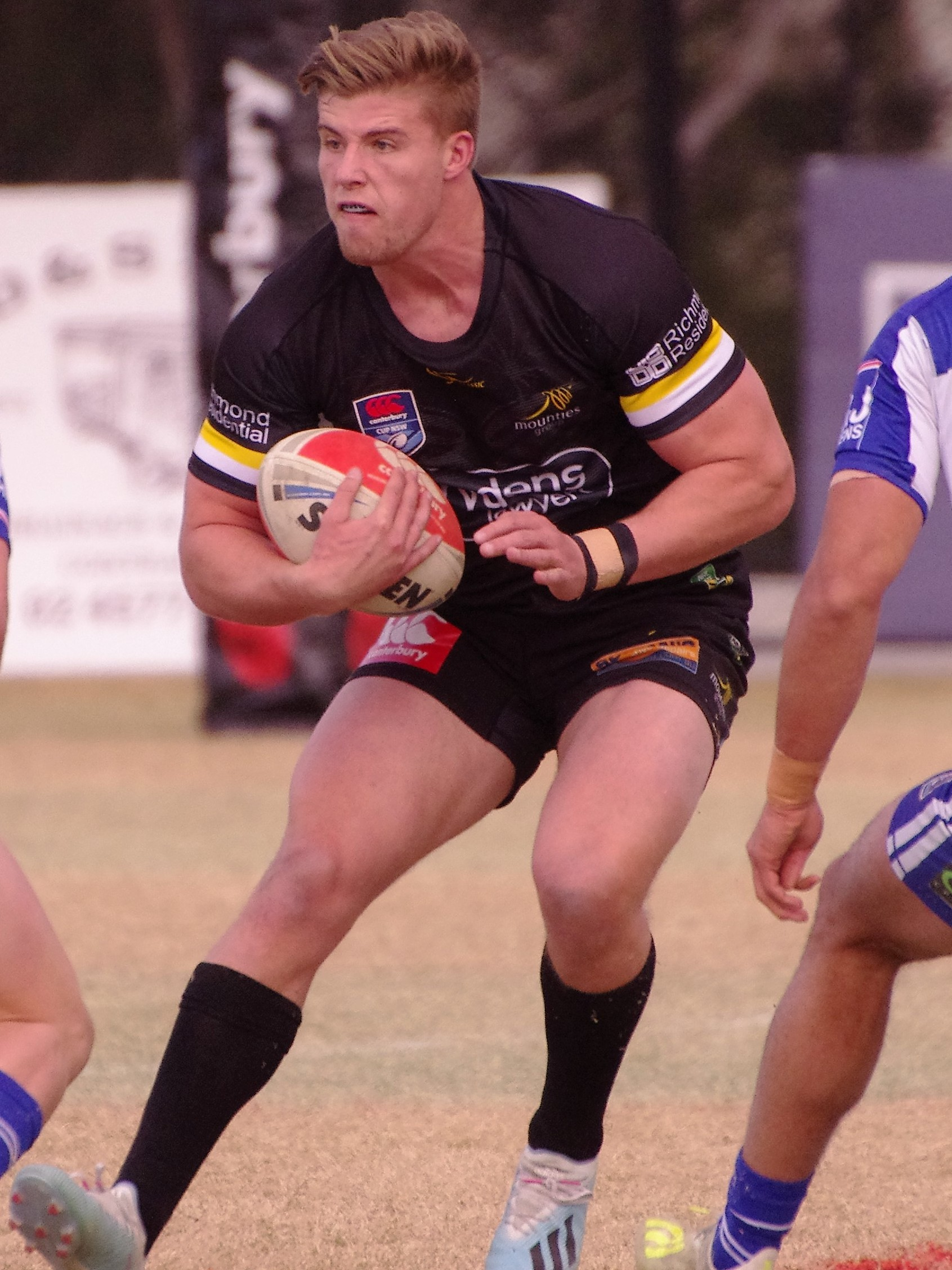

Personal information
- Born: 26 June 1997 (age 29) Batemans Bay, New South Wales, Australia
- Height: 193 cm (6 ft 4 in)
- Weight: 105 kg (16 st 7 lb)

Playing information
- Position: Second-row, Lock
Club
Years	Team	Pld	T	G	FG	P
2018–19	Canberra Raiders	3	0	0	0	0
2020–22	New Zealand Warriors	37	7	0	0	28
2023	Parramatta Eels	5	0	0	0	0
2024–25	Huddersfield Giants	17	3	0	0	12
	Total	62	10	0	0	40
- Source: As of 22 November 2026

Jack Murchie (born 26 June 1997) is an Australian rugby league footballer who plays as a second-row forward for the Thirlmere-Tahmoor Roosters in the Macarthur Rugby League.

He previously played for the Canberra Raiders, New Zealand Warriors and the Parramatta Eels in the National Rugby League (NRL).

== Background ==
Murchie was born in Batemans Bay, New South Wales, Australia.

His junior club was the Milton-Ulladulla Bulldogs.

== Career ==
He represented the Australian under 23s rugby league team at the 2018 Rugby League Commonwealth Championship, where they defeated Tonga in the final 14-8 and were coached by former Queensland State of Origin and Papua New Guinea international, Adrian Lam.

=== 2018 ===
In round 19 of the 2018 NRL season, Murchie made his club debut for Canberra, played at the interchange bench in the controversial 24-28 loss to Cronulla-Sutherland Sharks at Southern Cross Group Stadium.

=== 2019 ===
Murchie only made one appearance for Canberra in the 2019 NRL season which came against Manly-Warringah in round 7. Canberra would lose the match 24-20 at Brookvale Oval.

=== 2020 ===
On 21 May, Murchie was granted a release from Canberra Raiders to join the New Zealand Warriors on a one-year deal. 9 days after joining the Warriors, Murchie made his New Zealand Warriors debut in round 3 of the 2020 NRL season against St. George Illawarra Dragons starting from the bench, in the 18–0 win.

=== 2021-2022 ===
Murchie eventually re-signed with the New Zealand Warriors until the end of the 2022 NRL season due to the successful run they had from late 2021 into 2022. Murchie made a total of 14 appearances for the New Zealand club in 2022 as they finished 15th on the table. On 6 September 2022, it was announced that Murchie had been released by the New Zealand side. On 7 October 2022, Murchie signed with the Parramatta Eels on a two-year deal until the end of 2024.

=== 2023 ===
Murchie made his club debut for Parramatta in round 1 of the 2023 NRL season against Melbourne. Parramatta would lose 16-12 in golden point extra-time. Murchie only made five appearances for Parramatta throughout the season as he struggled to break into the first grade side. On 29 August, Murchie signed a three-year deal to join English side Huddersfield starting in 2024.

=== 2024 ===
Murchie played in 11 games scoring 3 tries with Huddersfield in the 2024 Super League season as they finished 9th on the table.

=== 2025 ===
On 18 June 2025 it was reported that Murchie had left Huddersfield to allow him to return to Australia, and thus free-up an overseas slot.

=== 2026 ===
On 19 January, it was reported that he had joined Thirlmere-Tahmoor Roosters in the Macarthur Rugby League in NSW.
