= List of racecourses in Sydney =

This is a list of racecourses in Sydney, New South Wales, Australia. The list includes both existing and former racecourses. Former racecourses are included in the list for historical interest only. The list is in alphabetic order. Unofficial or sponsorship names are shown in single inverted commas.

There were various types of racing:

- Greyhound racing - racing of greyhound dogs chasing a lure
- Harness racing - racing of standardbred horses pulling a driver in a two-wheeled cart, with different races for pace (more commonly) or trot gaits
- Pony racing (*) - racing at gallop of unregistered full-sized thoroughbreds and mixed-bred racehorses of a slightly smaller breed, at private courses
- Thoroughbred racing - racing at gallop of registered thoroughbred horses
- Steeplechase - horse racing involving jumping barriers; a course for this racing once existed at what is now Russell Lea, then part of Five Dock.

Typically, racecourses in Sydney were, and are, dedicated to one type of racing only. Pony racing and steeplechases no longer take place in Sydney.

(*) Sometimes referred to as 'Pony and Galloway racing', where Galloway has the specific Australian meaning of a horse between 14 and 15 hands.

Course Name	Owner(s) / Operator(s)	Location and Coordinates	Type of racing	Years of operation	Relevant information	Current use
Ascot Racecourse	Privately owned	North of Ross Smith Avenue, Mascot	Pony racing	1904—1941 Racing: Training:		Now part of Sydney Airport, used for long-term parking
Bankstown Paceway	Bankstown Harness Racing Club	Between Milperra & Eldridge Roads, Condell Park	Harness racing	1953—present		Racecourse
Brighton Racecourse	Thomas Saywell	North side of Bay Street, Brighton-le-Sands.	Pony racing Harness racing	1895—1911	Course was made by levelling a sandhill.	Residential housing in Princess and Gordon Streets and Moate Avenue.
Canterbury Park Racecourse	Sydney Turf Club, from 2011 Australian Turf Club	Bounded by Cooks River, King Street, John Street, and housing in the north, at Canterbury.	In early years, pony racing. Thoroughbred horse racing	1884—present	Initially, race meetings were annual events, dating back to at least 1871. Called Caterbury Park from early 1884.	Racecourse
Five Dock Farm	Mr Abercrombie	In the area of what is now the suburb, Russell Lea. One source says that the course was actually near to Birkenhead Point.	Steeplechase racing	1844—1846		Later site of the mansion 'Russel Lea Manor' and subsequently the suburb of Russell Lea.
Grose Farm	The original "Sydney Turf Club", which later became the Australian Jockey Club	In the area of the University of Sydney campus, or Royal Prince Alfred Hospital, at Camperdown. (Exact location not available.)	Thoroughbred horse racing	1826—1840	Racing moved to Homebush	University of Sydney or Royal Prince Alfred Hospital
Harold Park Paceway	NSW Harness Racing Club	Area bounded by Minogue Crescent, original route of Ross Street, and RozelleTram Depot, Forest Lodge	Pony racing Harness racing Greyhound racing	Pony racing, while known as Epping Raceway. Harness racing 1911–2010 Greyhounds 1927 —1987	Originally called Forest Lodge, then Epping Raceway. Course was extended in 1996.	Residential housing, and some public open space as parkland
Hawkesbury Racecourse 'Windsor Racecourse'	Hawkesbury Turf Club Currently, Hawkesbury Race Club	Racecourse Road, Clarendon	Thoroughbred horse racing	c.1830—now	Venue for the Hawkesbury Guineas Clarendon railway station was named Hawkesbury Racecourse from 1870 up to 1876.	Racecourse
Homebush	Australian Jockey Club	North of Great Western Highway, at Homebush West (opposite Flemington Markets) (Exact location not available)	Thoroughbred horse racing	1841—1859	Was on land owned by William Wentworth. AJC moved to Randwick in 1859	Part of Sydney Olympic Park
Hyde Park	NSW Government	What is now Hyde Park, in Sydney CBD, with the finish and grandstand being near what is now Market Street.	Thoroughbred horse racing	1810—1825 Governor Brisbane banned horseracing in 1825.	It set the pattern that horse races run clockwise in NSW.	Hyde Park, Sydney.
Kensington Racecourse	Rosehill Racing Club	Area bounded by High Street, Anzac Parade, and Barker Street, Kensington	Pony racing	1893—1942	Race meetings were held mid-week, so as not to compete with nearby Randwick. Used as a military camp from 1942	Now part of the University of NSW. Part of its tote building remains.
Menangle Park Paceway Sponsorship name "Tabcorp Park, Menangle"	New South Wales Harness Racing Club	Adjacent to Menangle Park railway station.	Harness racing	1914—now It was a racecourse until 1953	The principal paceway for Sydney since closure of Harold Park.	Racecourse
Moorfield Racecourse	P. J. Moore / Moorefield Turf Club Limited	The area of Kogarah bounded by President Avenue, Princes Highway, Marshall Street and the eastern boundary of Scarborough Park.	Pony racing	1888—1951		St George TAFE, James Cook Boys Technology High School, Moorefield Girls High School, and residential housing.
Penrith Paceway	Penrith District A H & I Society, trading as Club Paceway	Bounded by Mulgoa Road, houses on Rodley Ave, Station Street and Ransley Street, Penrith	Harness racing	1900—now		Racecourse
Petersham Racecourse	Thomas Shaw	On paddocks south from Woolpack Inn (now Bald Faced Stag Hotel) on Parramatta Road, Leichhardt, extending to what is now railway line at Petersham.	Horse racing (type uncertain)	1845—1849	Grandstand was on what is now Railway St, Petersham.	Now largely residential housing
Rosebery Park Racecourse	Privately owned	Corner of Botany Road and Gardeners Road (in 1894, Rainbow St), Alexandria	Pony racing & Training	1895—1906	Closed in December 1906, with racing moved to a new course. Land purchased by what is now NSWAFL, and used as a football field until c1915, when they could not afford the repayments.	Now factories.
Rosebery Racecourse	Rosebery Turf Club, later Sydney Turf Club	Southern side of Gardeners Road in Eastlakes	Pony racing	Racing: 1906–1942 Training: c.1946—1962		Now Eastlakes Shopping Centre, residential housing, and Jack Mundey Park.
Rosehill Gardens Racecourse	John Bennett From 1943, Sydney Turf Club From 2011, Australian Turf Club	Bounded by Grand Ave, James Ruse Drive, Unwin Street and Colquoun Street, Rosehill	Thoroughbred horse racing	1888—now		
Royal Randwick Racecourse	From 1860, Australian Jockey Club. From 2011, Australian Turf Club	Southern side of Allison Road, Randwick	Thoroughbred horse racing	1833—now	Was known as Randwick Racecourse. Renamed Royal Randwick in 1992.	Racecourse
Victoria Park Racecourse	James John Joynton Smith	Western side of South Dowling Street, south of O'Dea Avenue, east of Joynton Avenue, Zetland	Pony racing		Later was site of BMC / Leyland Australia car plant.	Residential housing (apartment blocks)
Warwick Farm Racecourse	Australian Jockey Club From 2011, Australian Turf Club	Bounded by Hume Highway, Governor Macquarie Drive, Cabramatta Creek and Georges River, Warwick Farm	Thoroughbred horse racing			Racecourse
Wentworth Park	NSW Greyhound Owners Breeders and Trainers Association	Greyhound course is part of larger Wentworth Park at Glebe.	Greyhound racing	Park used as a speedway until 1935 Greyhounds: 1932—2026		Dog track
