= Greyhound jockey =

Monkeys that rode racing dogs

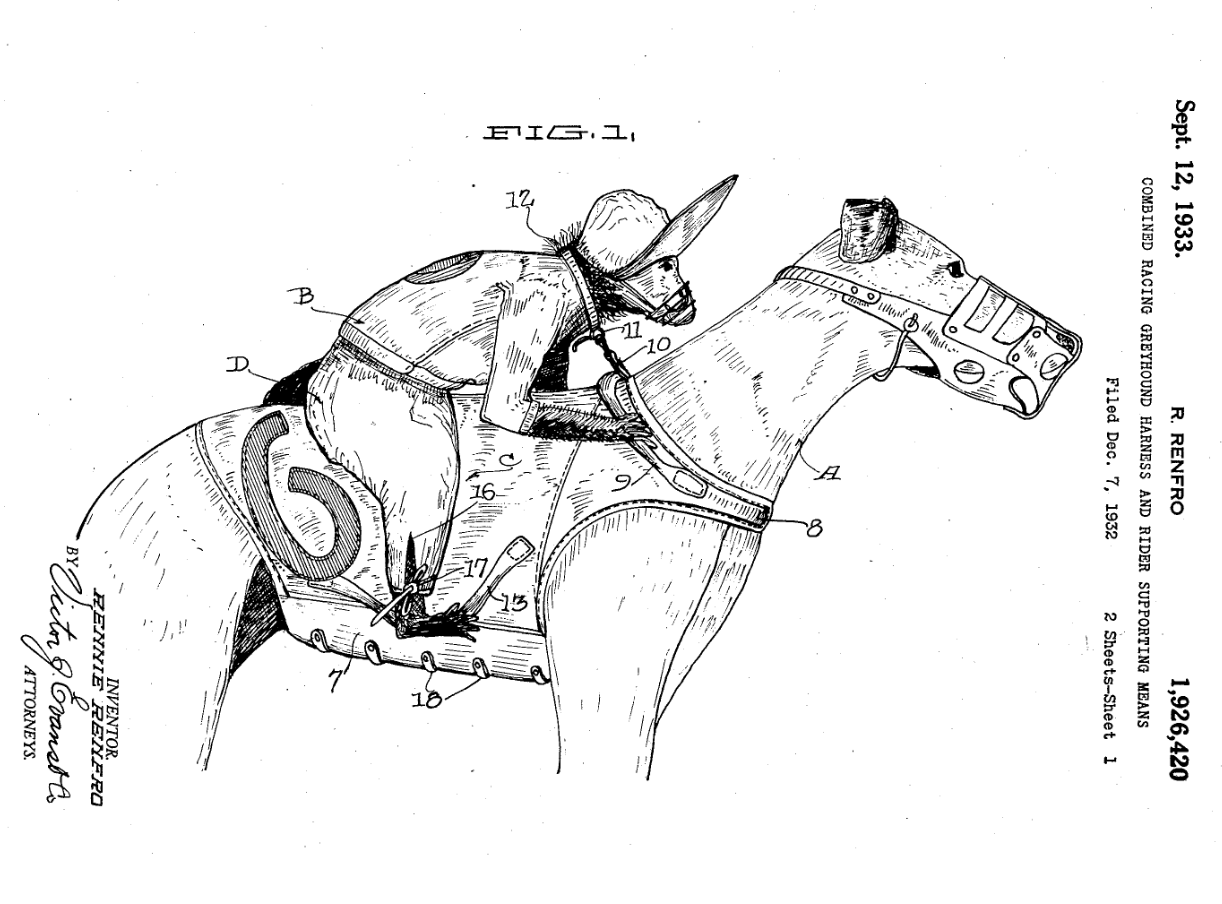
A patent for a monkey jockey harness.

Greyhound jockeys or monkey jockeys were capuchin monkeys trained to ride racing dogs for sport over a 500-metre (0.31 mi) course.

The use of monkeys as jockeys in greyhound races was recorded in Sydney at the Shepherd's Bush Race course in Mascot, in Sydney, Australia, in 1927, and 1928. Monkey jockeys were still being used in greyhound races in Victoria, Australia in 1938 and in Juárez, Mexico until the 1970s.

In the United States, monkey greyhound racing is claimed to have begun as a fad in Palm Beach, Florida, in 1930, conceived by Loretta and Charlie David. The couple obtained 12 female capuchin monkeys and over a period of two years trained them to ride greyhound racing dogs in specially designed saddle harnesses. The craze continued in the United States until the late 1930s, when the Humane Society of the United States complained and the public eventually lost interest.
