= Sewage Pumping Station 38 =

Sewage pumping station in Sydney, Australia

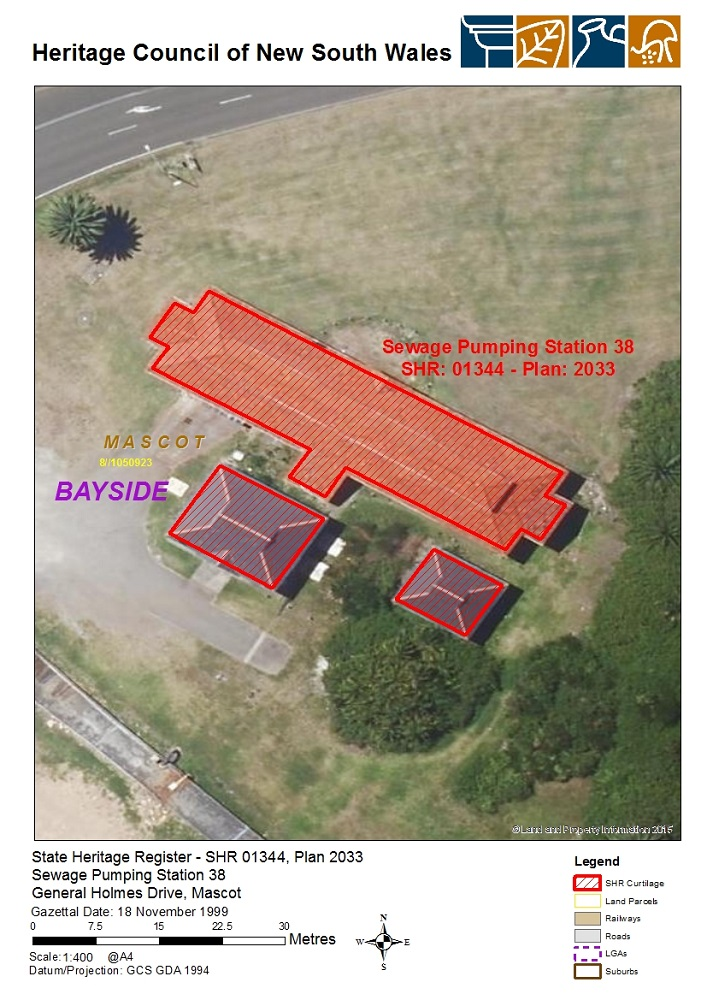
- Heritage boundaries

- Location in greater metropolitan Sydney
- 33.9426°S 151.1874°E
- Location: General Holmes Drive, Mascot, Bayside Council, New South Wales, Australia

History
- Built: 1919

Site notes
- Architect: Metropolitan Water Sewerage and Drainage Board
- Architectural style: Federation Free Style
- Owner: Sydney Water

New South Wales Heritage Register
- Official name: Sewage Pumping Station 38; SPS 38; Mascot Sewage Pumping Station; SP0038
- Type: State heritage (built)
- Designated: 18 November 1999
- Reference no.: 1344
- Type: Sewage Pump House/Pumping Station
- Category: Utilities - Sewerage
- Builders: Public Works Department

Sewage Pumping Station 38 is a heritage-listed sewerage pumping station located on General Holmes Drive, in the Sydney suburb of Mascot, in the Bayside Council local government area of New South Wales, Australia. It was designed and built by the Metropolitan Water Sewerage and Drainage Board. It is also known as SPS 38, Mascot Sewage Pumping Station and SP0038. The pumping station is owned by Sydney Water, an agency of the Government of New South Wales. It was added to the New South Wales State Heritage Register on 18 November 1999.

== History ==
SPS 38 was the first pumping station constructed to serve the newly installed SWOOS No.1, which superseded the Botany-Rockdale Sewage Farm (ceased 1911). This action was the product of a Parliamentary Inquiry held between 1905 and 1908, in which it was decided to divert the sewage of the southern, western and Illawarra suburbs from the Botany and Rockdale Sewage Farms to discharge into the ocean near Long Bay. A gravitation scheme was decided upon, supplemented in places by the introduction of a slight gradient to aid in transportation. The construction of this ocean outfall sewer was carried out by the Public Works Department (PWD) and put into commission in 1919. SPS 38 was constructed to service the low-lying areas of the Cooks River Estuary and Ascot Racecourse.

== Description ==
SPS 38 is a conventional low-level sewage pumping station (LLSPS) with a circular concrete substructure housed within a single storey Federation Free Style industrial building. Adjacent to this is a three-pump machinery well. Externally there is a slate gambrel roof with terracotta hip and ridge cappings, two timber louvered gambrel vents, projecting gable and exposed eaves with V-jointed T & G ponding boards. The masonry is well-burnt brown brick, timber framed double-hung windows with sandstone sills, brick arches and recent security grilles; entrance consisting of steel roller shutter door, recessed brick reveal and a rubbed sandstone lintel inscribed with the letters "MWS & DB 1915". Rainwater goods consist of fibre cement gutters, rainwater heads and downpipe. Internally the ceiling is lined with V-jointed T & G boarding with a large scotia cornice. There is a large ventilation grille centered on the ceiling; walls of painted brickwork and chequer plate flooring. SPS 38 is located adjacent to an inspection hall and substation which are of similar appearance. The buildings themselves stand alone in a grassed area adjacent to the old water pumping station. They can be prominently seen from General Holmes Drive and as a group have landmark value.

This SPS is substantially intact. There is damage to the masonry around window security fittings, and the stone sills are severely weathered. The projecting rails which would have been fixed to the projecting gable are no longer in situ.

== Heritage listing ==
This Station was the first of an original group of low level Sewage Pumping Stations constructed to serve the SWOOS No.1 in 1916. It is a representative example of a simple, robust and well-proportioned Federation Free Style industrial building, the architectural expressions of which can be found in the structural detailing of the facade, superb brickwork, and roof forms. In addition, the mechanical components housed within the building have potential industrial archaeological value. Its architectural detailing makes a strong contribution to the visual catchment of the airport precinct and Botany area. The Station is currently in use as a LLSPS.

Sewage Pumping Station 38 was listed on the New South Wales State Heritage Register on 18 November 1999.

== See also ==
- Sydney Water
- Australian non-residential architectural styles
