= Matt Groat =

Australian rugby league footballer (born 1992)

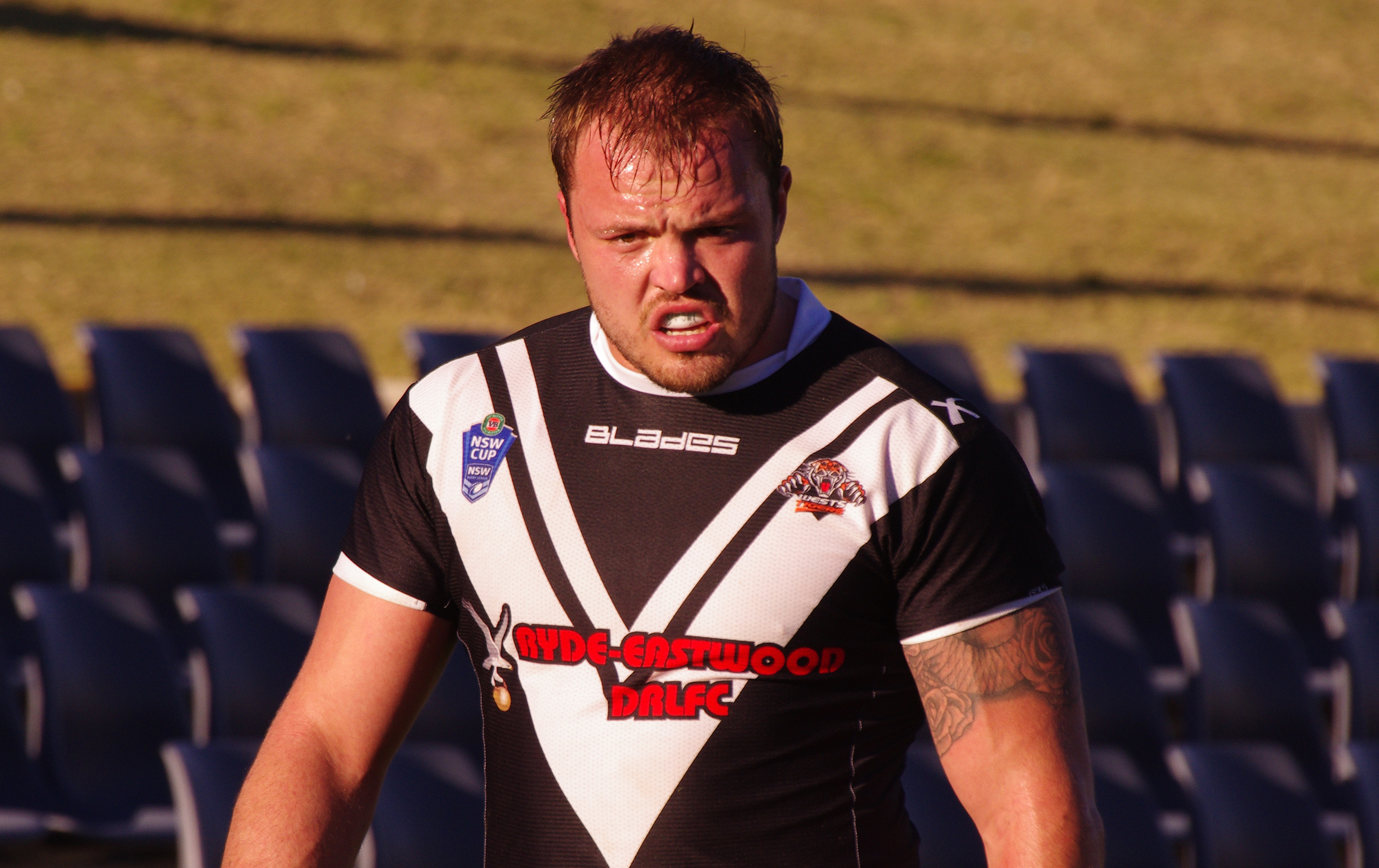

Personal information
- Born: 4 March 1992 (age 34) Sydney, Australia
- Height: 192 cm (6 ft 4 in)
- Weight: 120 kg (18 st 13 lb)

Playing information
- Position: Prop, Second-row, Lock
Club
Years	Team	Pld	T	G	FG	P
2011–13	Wests Tigers	17	0	0	0	0
2015	Doncaster	16	4	0	0	16
2016	Dewsbury Rams	24	1	0	0	4
	Total	57	5	0	0	20
- Source: As of 26 October 2023

Matthew Groat (born 4 March 1992) is an Australian former professional rugby league footballer who last played for the Souths Logan Magpies in the Queensland Cup. He previously played for Thirlmere Roosters in the Group 6 Rugby League, St. George Illawarra Dragons, Wests Tigers in the NRL and Doncaster, and the Dewsbury Rams in the Championship. He also played in the Queensland Cup for the Wynnum-Manly Seagulls and Easts Tigers. He played as a prop.

As a junior he represented the Australian Schoolboys in 2009 and 2010 and later played for the Junior Kangaroos and the New South Wales under-20s.

== Playing career ==
=== Early years ===
From the small town of Rankins Springs in the Riverina, Groat lived on a 6000ha property. He went to school in Griffith, before becoming a student at renowned rugby league school St Gregory's College, Campbelltown. During his time at the school, he was named as the most valuable player for his team at the 2010 Australian Schoolboys Championships, and represented the Australian Schoolboys team in 2009 and 2010. In 2011, he was named in the Junior Kangaroos team.

=== Wests Tigers ===
Groat joined the Wests Tigers NYC Cup team in 2011. By round 12 he had progressed to making his début in first grade, after a late injury to Wade McKinnon. Having already played a lower-grade game, Groat came off the bench in the last 5 minutes. Later in the season, Groat became a regular in the first side, playing off the bench. Wests Tigers won 8 of the 10 games he played in 2011.

In an early-season match in 2012, Groat was knocked unconscious by a shoulder charge from Brisbane Broncos forward Ben Te'o. The incident was considered a "test case" on how the NRL Judiciary would treat players who made contact with the head when attempting a shoulder-charge. Two weeks later Groat played for New South Wales in the inaugural under-20s State of Origin match, but he failed to make a further first grade appearance for the season.

Groat was unable to play at the start of 2013 due to injury. Coach Mick Potter said, "Matt got his ankle, foot and toe caught in the ground and got some weight on the back of it. He had been working hard and his shape was looking better too." He didn't play any first grade in 2013.

=== St. George Illawarra Dragons ===
In September 2013, it was announced that Groat had signed with the Dragons for at least one season. He failed to make any first-grade appearances for the club, and a year later signed with Salford.

=== Doncaster ===
On 16 April 2015, Groat signed for English side Doncaster. Total Rugby League reported that the 23-year-old prop arrived “with a high pedigree”, having played 17 NRL games for the Wests Tigers and spending the previous year with St George Illawarra.

=== Dewsbury ===
On 29 January 2016, Groat was released by Doncaster and signed with Dewsbury. He featured regularly in the front row, making 24 league appearances and scoring one try.

=== Central Queensland ===
In 2017, Groat returned to Australia and signed with Queensland Cup side the Central Queensland Capras. On 16 January 2018, Groat was released by Central Queensland and signed with the Easts Tigers.

=== Easts Tigers ===
Groat made a total of eight appearances for Easts (now Brisbane Tigers) in his first season at the club scoring no tries.

=== Wynnum Manly ===
In the 2019 Queensland Cup, Groat played for Wynnum Manly Seagulls where he made 15 appearances.

=== Souths Logan ===
In the 2020 Queensland Cup, Groat played for Souths Logan Magpies making one appearance.

== Personal life ==
Groat has studied a Certificate 4 in Fitness.
