= Sione Tovo =

Tonga & Niue international rugby league footballer

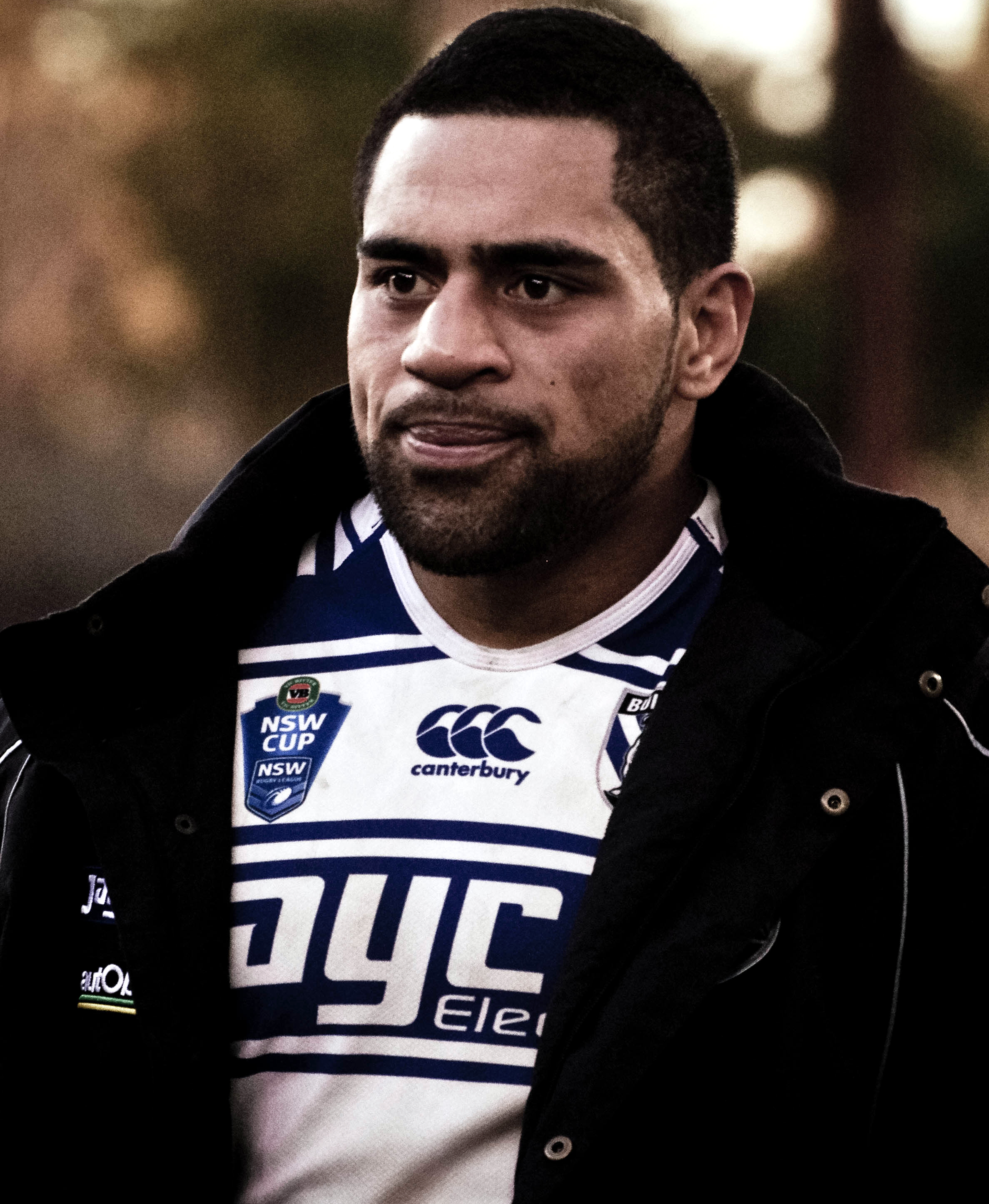

Personal information
- Full name: Sione Na'a Pangai Tovo
- Born: 19 July 1988 (age 37) Mascot, New South Wales, Australia
- Height: 178 cm (5 ft 10 in)
- Weight: 110 kg (17 st 5 lb)

Playing information
- Position: Prop
Club
Years	Team	Pld	T	G	FG	P
2009	Newcastle Knights	1	0	0	0	0
Representative
Years	Team	Pld	T	G	FG	P
2009	Tonga	2	0	0	0	0
2017–18	Niue	5	0	0	0	0
- Source: As of 8 February 2021

Sione Na'a Pangai Tovo (born 19 July 1988) is a former Tonga international rugby league footballer who plays as a prop for the Mascot Juniors RLFC in the A Grade South Sydney Juniors Rugby League . He previously played for the Thirlmere Roosters in the Grade 6 competition, Auburn Warriors in the Bundaberg Red Cup and the Newcastle Knights in the NRL.

== Playing career ==
Born in Mascot, New South Wales, Tovo played his junior football for the Mascot Jets before being signed by the South Sydney Rabbitohs. He played for the South Sydney Harold Matthews Cup, S. G. Ball Cup and Jersey Flegg Cup teams before being signed by the Newcastle Knights.

Tovo played for Newcastle's NYC team in 2008 and 2009 before moving on to the clubs NSW Cup reserve-grade team in 2010. In Round 23 of the 2009 NRL season, Tovo made his NRL for the Newcastle club against the Melbourne Storm. Tovo played from the bench in the clubs 26–14 victory at Marathon Stadium. At the end of the 2010 NRL season, Tovo was released by the Newcastle side.

In 2011, Tovo joined the Wests Tigers NSW Cup team, the Balmain Ryde-Eastwood Tigers. In 2012, Tovo joined the Auburn Warriors in the Bundaberg Red Cup. In 2018, Tovo returned to Mascot Juniors RLFC where he currently plays.

== Representative career ==
=== Tonga ===
In 2009, Tovo was named in the Tongan squad for the 2009 Pacific Cup

=== Niue ===
In 2017 he represented Niue vs Lebanon.
