= Mick Craigie =

Australian rugby league footballer and administrator

Personal information
- Full name: Eric Norman Craigie
- Born: 22 June 1917; Mascot, New South Wales, Australia
- Died: 4 September 2004 (aged 87); Brighton-Le-Sands, New South Wales, Australia

Playing information
- Position: Lock
Club
Years	Team	Pld	T	G	FG	P
1943–45	St. George	12	4	0	0	12

Eric Norman "Mick" Craigie (22 June 1917 – 4 September 2004) was an Australian rugby league footballer who played in the 1940s.

Craigie joined the Saints after his discharge from the Australian Army in 1942 After moving into the St. George Area in 1943 at Ramsgate, New South Wales, he joined St. George. Craigie was promoted from Reserve Grade at St. George in 1943 and was the reserve lock for first grade, between 1943 and 1945. He went on to captain the first grade team on a few occasions in 1943.

Craigie retired at the end of the 1945 season.

Eric Norman (Mick) Craigie died on 4 September 2004 at Brighton-Le-Sands, New South Wales aged 87.
