= Thirlmere-Tahmoor Roosters =

Australian rugby league club, based in Thirlmere, NSW

Thirlmere Roosters

Club information
- Full name: Thirlmere-Tahmoor Roosters Rugby League Football Club
- Colours: Maroon; Yellow; White
- Founded: 1976; 50 years ago
- Website: on facebook

Current details
- Ground: Thirlmere Sportsground
- Competition: Group 6 Rugby League
- 2020: Premiers

Records
- Premierships: 7 (2001, 2003, 2006, 2008, 2019, 2020, 2023)
- Runners-up: 5 (1996, 2007, 2009, 2012, 2017)
- Minor premierships: 4 (2006, 2008, 2019, 2020)

The Thirlmere Roosters Rugby League Football Club is an Australian rugby league football club based in Thirlmere, New South Wales, formed in 1976. They currently play in the Group 6 Rugby League competition.

Thirlmere, with its maroon and gold strip were a 1914 foundation club in the Berrima District Rugby League competition, becoming a 1st division team of the Group 6 Rugby League in 1946. The junior teams are the Thirlmere-Tahmoor Roosters.

== Notable players ==
- Yileen Gordon
- Eddie Paea
- Lelea Paea
- Matt Groat
- Sione Kite
- Jacob Loko
- Jake Mullaney
- Anthony Cherrington
- Sione Tovo
- Blake Ferguson
- Curtis Scott
- Tim Simona
- Nicholas Stamatiou
- James Frazer
- Jarrod Clark
- Heath Mason
