= Ascot Racecourse, Sydney =

Racecourse in Australia

Coordinates: 33°56.3′S 151°11.4′E

Ascot Racecourse was a former racecourse in the southern Sydney suburb of Mascot, close to the Mascot Aerodrome. It was named after Royal Ascot Racecourse in the United Kingdom. The site is now part of Sydney Airport. It operated from 1904 to 1941, and was one of four racecourses in Sydney where unregistered proprietary horse racing took place.

Large crowds were transported to and from the racecourse by a dedicated tramline from Botany Road. The first aeroplane flight over Sydney was made from Ascot Racecourse on 5 May 1911, by J.J. Hammond in his Boxkite plane. The racecourse closed during World War II when it was used as a military camp and did not reopen after the war. It was demolished as part of expansion works for Sydney Airport. The only surviving physical evidence of the racecourse are fifteen fig trees which formerly lined the racecourse entrance. These trees are located near the airport's long-term carpark, and are the subject of heritage preservation.

== See also ==
- Ascot Racecourse, Western Australia
- List of racecourses in Sydney
