= Macarthur Rugby League =

Rugby league competition in New South Wales, Australia

Macarthur Conference Rugby League
- Former Group 6 logo
- Sport: Rugby league
- Formerly known as: Group 6 Rugby League
- Instituted: 1914 (as Berrima District Rugby League)
- Inaugural season: 1946 (as Group 6)
- Number of teams: 19 (11 in First Grade)
- Country: Australia
- Premiers: Thirlmere Roosters (2023)
- Most titles: Picton Magpies (13 titles)

The Macarthur Conference Rugby League is a senior Rugby league competition in New South Wales, Australia, administered by the New South Wales Rugby League. Formerly known as Group 6 Rugby League, the competition was, until 2019, run under the auspices of the Country Rugby League. The geographical area covered by the former CRL Group 6 takes in much of the Southern Highlands and southern Macarthur regions of New South Wales, extending from Marulan, New South Wales in the south, to Mount Annan/ the M5 in the north and Warragamba in the west.

The competition features eight grades, with these being First Grade, Reserve Grade, Third Grade, Open Age (Fourths), Women's Tackle, League Tag, Under 20s and Under 18s.

== Senior clubs ==
Due to the COVID-19 pandemic in Australia the commencement of Group 6 2020 season was postponed. Delayed, competition matches began on 2 August 2020. The number of First Grade participants decreased from nine teams in 2019 to five teams in 2020, but had rebounded to 11 by the 2023 season.

An unrelated change between the 2019 and 2020 seasons was the merger of the Moss Vale Dragons and Bowral Blues, forming a new club Highlands Storm. This club then moved to the Group 7 Rugby League competition.

The following table notes the clubs and the teams they fielded in the 2019 and 2020 Group 6 senior competitions: 1st Grade, Reserve Grade (2nd), Third Grade/Division 2 and Under 18s (U18), Women's tackle (Wom) and Ladies League Tag (LLT).

Club	City/Suburbs	Homeground	2023 Season										
Club	City/Suburbs	Homeground	A	B	B2	C	W	U18s 1	U18s 2	U18s G	WLT 1	WLT 2	O35LT
First Grade Clubs													
Camden Rams	Camden	Kirkham Park	check	check			check	check		check	check	check	
Campbelltown City Kangaroos	Sydney (Claymore)	Fullwood Reserve	check	check		check	check	check	check	check	check	check	
Campbelltown Collegians	Sydney (Bradbury)	Bradbury Oval	check	check			check		check	check			
East Campbelltown Eagles	Sydney (Campbelltown)	Waminda Oval	check	check		check	check	check		check			check
Mittagong Lions	Mittagong	Mittagong Sports Ground	check	check		check	check	check	check			check	
Narellan Jets	Sydney (Narellan)	Narellan Sports Ground	check	check			check	check			check		check
Oakdale Workers	Oakdale	Sid Sharpe Memorial Oval	check	check							check		
Picton Magpies	Picton	Victoria Park	check	check		check		check	check		check	check	
South West Goannas	Camden	Onslow Oval	check	check									
The Oaks Tigers	The Oaks	Dudley Chesham Sports Ground	check	check		check			check				check
Thirlmere-Tahmoor Roosters	Thirlmere	Thirlmere Sports Ground	check	check									
Second Division Clubs													
Appin Dogs	Appin	Appin Park			check							check	check
Eagle Vale-St Andrews Magpies	Sydney (Eschol Park)	Eschol Park Sports Complex			check			check					check
Glenquarie All Stars	Sydney (Glenfield)	Seddon Park			check	check							
Liverpool Catholic Club Raiders	Sydney (Liverpool)	Hillier Oval			check				check				
Minto Cobras	Sydney (Minto)	Benham Reserve			check		check		check				
Mount Annan-Currans Hill Knights	Sydney (Currans Hill)	Jack Nash Reserve			check	check			check			check	
Oran Park-Gregory Hills Chargers	Sydney (Oran Park)	Jack Brabham Reserve			check							check	
Warragamba Wombats	Warragamba	Warragamba Sportsground			check	check						check	check
Other Divisions
Campbelltown Warriors	Sydney (Ruse)	Worrell Park											check
East Hills Bulldogs	Sydney (East Hills)	Smith Park									check		
Moorebank Rams	Sydney (Moorebank)	Hammondville Oval									check		

- A = First Grade
- B = Reserve Grade
- B2 = Second Division
- C = Third Grade
- W = Women's Tackle
- U18s 1 = Under 18s Division One
- U18s 2 = Under 18s Division Two
- U18s G = Under 18s Girls
- WLT 1 = Women's League Tag Division One
- WLT 2 = Women's League Tag Division Two
- O35LT = Over 35s Men's League Tag

== Past clubs ==
Clubs from the greater Campbelltown, New South Wales area participated in the 1st Division Group 6 competition from 1946 to 1983. These clubs as well as other former clubs included:

=== Division 1 ===
Club	Moniker	Years Contested	Premierships	Notes
All Saints Liverpool	Saints	2010	None	Moved
Appin	Dogs	??	None	Plays in Division 2
Bowral	Blues	1914–2019	1926, 1944, 1947, 1950, 1952, 1954, 1956–58, 1960–61, 1965, 1968	Merged with Moss Vale to form Southern Highlands Storm
Campbelltown RSL	Warriors	1970–1983	1972, 1979	Plays in Division 2
Goulburn	Stockmen	2005–2007	2007	Folded (Players joined re-formed Goulburn Workers in Canberra RL)
Ingleburn	Bulldogs	1974–1983	None	Folded
Leumeah	Wolves	1971–1977	None	Folded
Moss Vale	Dragons	1914-2019	1920, 1925, 1927–30, 1953, 1955, 1982, 1984, 1990, 2010	Merged with Bowral to form Southern Highlands Storm
Southern Highlands	Storm	2020	None	Moved (Group 7 Rugby League)
Warragamba	Wombats	??	1989	Plays in Division 2

=== Division 2 ===
Clubs from Campbelltown to feature in the 2nd Division and 3rd Division leagues from 1973 to 1983 included:

- Macquarie Fields Hawks
- Cross Roads Tavern
- Tharawal Ghosts
- Airds Colts
- Claymore Panthers
- Campbelltown Sharks
- Minto Cobras
- Ingleburn RSL

Other clubs to have played in Group 6 Lower Grades include:

- The Bowral–Robertson Pioneers
- Appin Warriors
- Berrima Gaol 'The Colts'
- Berrima
- Hinchinbrook Hornets
- Wingello
- Wildes Meadow
- Sutton Forest
- Bundanoon Highlanders
- Robertson Spuddies (transferred to Group 7)

== History ==
=== Berrima District Rugby League ===
==== 1914–45: Berrima and Wollondilly ====
Rugby Union was played in the area as far back as 1890, with the Berrima District Rugby League making its debut in 1914. Teams in the 1914 premiership were Picton, Robertson, Bowral, Mittagong, Moss Vale, Thirlmere and Wildes Meadow.

Competition football resumed 1919. During the 1920s Camden, Campbelltown and, in some years, Picton teams played in the Southern Districts Rugby League. Bowral, Mittagong, Moss Vale and Thirlmere were regulars in the Berrima premiership. From 1924 to 1930, a knockout competition, the Warleigh Cup, was held at the end of the season in senior, reserve and junior grades. Between 1928 and 1930 the Warleigh Cup was played in lieu of premiership finals. In 1931 the cup was held in May.

At the northern end of the region Camden, Campbelltown, Picton left the SDRL and with Bargo and Thirlmere formed the Wollondilly association. Senior and junior competitions were held in 1929.

In the early 1930s, premiership football gave way to a plethora of challenge cups, which had begun to be introduced. The high rate of unemployment was cited as a reason for favouring challenge cups over competition. Typically, a cup was donated to a club and matches were arranged to contest its possession. A cup might change hands multiple times during a season. The club that originally owned a cup often had the right to challenge the holders in the last match of the season in which the cup was on the line. Names of the cups included Sommers, Citizens, Cornwall, Commercial, Dawson-Lack, Dawson-Frazer, Theo Small and Murphy. There were cups for reserve grade – Burchell, Dresher and Whyte – and junior teams – Wales & Jackson.

Competition in a round-robin format resumed in 1935, with Group 6 clubs organised in northern and southern divisions and a handicap system applied. Group 6 disbanded in 1936 and no competition was held.

Berrima District Rugby League reformed and conducted competitions in 1937. Bowral won the final 23 to nil but lost the title on a protest by Mittagong, upheld by the league. A resident of New Berrima had played throughout the season despite not being residentially qualified to play with Bowral. Despite a warning from Mittagong, he played in the final. Berrima mixed a four-team competition with challenge cup matches in 1938. Meanwhile, the re-formed Wollondilly District experimented with a one-day carnival premiership. A re-established Group 6 coordinated a cup draw in 1939. Despite the war, some senior football was played the following season.

Burrawang-Robertson and two Bargo teams participated in a 1944 competition with premiers Bowral and runners-up Mittagong. Campbelltown, Moss Vale, Picton and Thirlmere resumed playing the next year.

=== Group 6 Era ===
==== 1946–68: Highland Fling ====
'Group 6', as it is now known, officially recommenced in 1946 with Campbelltown Kangaroos claiming the inaugural premiership undefeated. Eleven first grade teams were divided into north and south divisions, with the winners of each divisions meeting in a grand-final.

Bowral Blues and Mittagong Lions would dominate these years.

Picton Magpies would win the Group's first ever Clayton Cup with an undefeated season in 1966 under the captain- coaching of Billy Peel. The Magpies were on track to go back-to-back in 1967, entering the 1967 decider undefeated. However, in one of the Group's biggest ever boilovers, the John Cole inspired Mittagong Lions rolled the black 'n whites, denying Picton a certain back-to-back Clayton Cup.

==== 1969–83: Campbelltown City Kangaroos. One of the CRL's Greatest Clubs Dominates ====
This period marks the era of the Campbelltown clubs. The rapid expansion of the Sydney metropolitan area saw a population boom in the Campbelltown area. New suburbs brought new clubs. After Campbelltown Kangaroos defeated the Bowral Blues 22–3 in the 1969 Grand Final, two new clubs were formed- the Campbelltown RSL Warriors and Campbelltown Collegians.

Captain- coached by former St George Dragons hooker Ray Corkery, the Kangaroos would win three successive Group 6 premierships- defeating Oakdale Workers in 1970 and the RSL Warriors in 1971.

Now known as the Campbelltown City Kangaroos, the club started to enshrine its Group 6 dominance with the construction of a Leagues Club to finance its League teams. This club has now morphed into Wests Leagues Campbelltown.

Contending for 4 straight premierships in 1972, the Roos were controversially defeated by Camden in the major semi final of that year. The RSL Warriors would go on to defeat Camden in the 1972 Grand Final.

Campbelltown City soon struck back though with the signature of Canterbury & Australian test centre Johnny Greaves. Greaves, possibly the best player the Group has seen, captain- coached the 'Roos to another treble- defeating Campbelltown Collegians in 1973 and Ingleburn Bulldogs in 1974 and 1975.

The Oaks would win their first premiership with a dogged 16–10 victory in the 1976 decider over Camden Rams. Captain- coached by the mercurial Les Williams, the Tigers had a week earlier thwarted City's attempts to become the first Group 6 club to win 4 consecutive premierships. Williams' men would repeat the dose in 1977 with a 22–3 thumping of Camden again. These years would prove bitter sweet for the Camden club, losing all 3 grades on Grand Final day in 1976 and 1977. Ingleburn Bulldogs lowered the Rams colours in consecutive reserve grade grand finals of 1976 & 1977.

Camden would finally break the spell with victory over the Campbelltown RSL Warriors in the 1978 Premiership. Camden's jinx returned though with the Warriors claiming revenge in 1979 with a 9–2 victory over the Rams.

Spurred into action by their first ever wooden spoon in 1979 (the first time they had missed the semi-finals since 1963), Campbelltown City sought revenge for the 1980 premiership, indulging in a recruitment drive that brought former Australian schoolboy representative Paul Murray to the club as captain-coach and Bulldogs legend and hardman Phil Charlton to the club to beef up the front row. With local prominent solicitor John Marsden behind them, the 'Roos would become the first club in Group 6 history to go from last to first in one season. Murray's men lost only two games that season, going on to record a dominant 25–9 victory over the Picton Magpies in the 1980 Grand Final.

Picton would turn the tables on the 'Roos in the 1981 Grand Final, emerging triumphant 15–11. Picton were led to victory by the dominance of captain Ron Kain & hooker John White in the scrum, starving the City backline of possession.

The early 80s also saw the emergence of the Moss Vale Dragons team. Based around the youthful potential from their 1979 Reserve Grade and U/18s premiership team from 1980, the Dragons would win the 1982, 1984 and 1990 1st Grade premierships. A tough team, the Dragons were led by captain- coach Brian Milthorpe and 1st Graders like Mark Knight, Chris Cumming, Owen Saunders, John Burke, Terry Loader and Shane Green.

By 1983, it was fairly apparent that there was a significant separation between the Campbelltown clubs and the rest of the Group, which was still essentially 'country' in nature. Ten out of 15 contested premierships had been won by Campbelltown City (8) or the RSL Warriors (2). There was no sign of this imbalance abating.

The NSWRL ordered ailing premiership club Newtown Jets to form a merger with the Campbelltown club. The original plan was for Newtown to regroup in the 1984 season on the sidelines and then re-enter the NSWRL premiership in 1985 as the Newtown- Campbelltown Jets. This never eventuated.

As a by-product of this merger, all Campbelltown clubs were ordered by the then NSWRL chairman Kevin Humphreys to join with the Liverpool Rugby League clubs contained within the Parramatta junior league. A Group 6 general committee vote then authorised the transfer of the Campbelltown clubs to the NSWRL.

Fittingly, Campbelltown City Kangaroos would win the last Group 6 premiership they contested in 1983. Finishing the regular season second to the Clayton Cup bound Moss Vale, the 'Roos led by Tim Sheens lowered the Dragons colours 15–2 in dramatic circumstances at Loseby Park, Bowral in the major semi final of that year. The 'Roos would defeat The Oaks 24–6 in the Grand Final of 1983 at their spiritual base, Orana Park. This would be Campbelltown City's last game as a Country Rugby League club until their return in 2011. Their senior club was a major casualty of the abortive merger with Newtown. It would take thirty years for the blue and golds to re-emerge in their rightful senior competition.

==== 1984–2008: A True Country League ====
With the departure of the Campbelltown clubs, the Group 6 Executive committee abolished 2nd Division and forced all clubs up into 1st Division. Moss Vale would claim the 1984 premiership with a 36–12 crushing of the Camden Rams.

With the loss of the Campbelltown clubs, Moss Vale was left way out in front of the remaining teams- or so it seemed. After cruising through 1984 season, the Dragons were expected to repeat the dose in 1985. With their youthful combination now hitting the peak of its powers, the red and whites destroyed Picton 42–8 in the 1985 Major Semi-final and started at Black Caviar odds to secure the Premiership in a canter. The Maggies would have other ideas though. Captain- coached by former NSWRL 1st Grader Rod Henniker, Picton caused one of the Group's biggest upsets, turning the tables 16–8 in the 1985 decider at Kirkham Park, Camden.

Group 6 clubs at this time were Moss Vale Dragons, Camden Rams, The Oaks Tigers, Oakdale Workers, Thirlmere Roosters, Picton Magpies, Bowral Blues, Narellan Jets, Mittagong Lions. Robertson Spuddies were still affiliated with the Group but were unable to field 1st Division senior teams until 1988.

Henniker turned down the 1986 captain- coaching job at Picton. The Magpies didn't let that affect their ambitions, going better and appointing former 1977 and 1979 St George Dragons premiership winner and front row hardman, Robert Stone to steer their club's fortunes. In a golden era for the black and whites, Stone masterminded the 1986 and 1987 premiership successes at Victoria Park.

1986 saw the NSWRL allow Warragamba Wombats to rejoin Group 6 from the Penrith Junior League. The Wombats were successful in their first season back, with their U/18 team defeating Campbelltown City in the Grand Final. City had been granted special dispensation by the CRL to compete in the U/18 competition only as the Campbelltown- Liverpool competition lacked the numbers to compose a competition in this grade.

Warragamba wouldn't have to wait long for top grade success, claiming the 1989 Grand Final with a 22–12 victory over Oakdale Workers. This has been Warragamba's only 1st Grade premiership to date, with their club falling on tough times in the last decade. The Wombats still contest the Group 6 Second Division premiership.

Mittagong under the coaching of Grahame Andrewes would claim the Group's second Clayton Cup with a dominant undefeated season in 1991. The Lions had to overcome some nervous moments in the Grand Final of that season against a valiant Oakdale Workers team seeking its club's inaugural title. Mittagong would take both the 1st and Reserve Grade premierships that season. Andrewes was the successful mentor behind the Lions' premiership victories of 1988, 1991 and 1995.

1992 had seen the introduction of the powerful Appin Warriors club. Formed from the Campbelltown Warriors A Grade premiership team from the Wests Junior League, they would add value to the League, with the 1994 Grand Final loss to Camden Rams being their high water mark. The Warriors would come close to the senior treble that 1994 GF day, winning the U/18s and Reserve Grade against Camden, before the Rams claimed the one that mattered with a 26–4 rout of Appin. A major act of vandalism that night though by Warriors players against the very shops that sponsored them would eventually cost them their club, as they petered out at the end of the 1997 season.

The Oaks Tigers would break their premiership drought in 1992 with a commanding win over Picton. Based around a brutal forward pack that contained ex-Sydney 1st Graders Marty Quinn and Paul Fuz, the Tigers left all in their wake in a dominant season.

In 1993, Oakdale Workers would claim their inaugural Group 6 1st Grade title with a 29–14 victory over Camden Rams at Kirkham Park. Coached by Frank Marino and captained by ex- West Magpie Brian Brown, Brian Taylor and Terry Broadhead, the red and blacks capped a fine season on the day when it mattered most.

With the construction of new suburbs towards the northern end of Camden Council, both the Camden and Narellan clubs started to dominate the group towards the end of the 90s. A new club, Mount Annan Knights emerged, playing in the 1st Grade competition from 1998 to 2000. Mount Annan would struggle though alongside Narellan and Camden, eventually returning to 2nd Division.

From 2005 to 2007, the Goulburn Stockmen would enter the competition. With the Group 6 First Grade competition struggling and the Goulburn Club struggling to keep pace with the Canberra competition, it was mutually beneficial to see the Stockmen enter into Group 6. They came into the competition highly fancied, and it wasn't until 2007 that they managed to take out the Group 6 title with a dramatic Win over Thirlmere Roosters at Thirlmere Sportsground, after Thirlmere front row forward Peter Jensen was sensationally sent from the field.

2008: Coached by Jamie Horner, Thirlmere Roosters would claim the last Group 6 competition under the old format with a thrilling 19–16 victory over Oakdale Workers at Community Oval, Moss Vale.

By around 2005, it was clear that both the former Campbelltown area of the Group and indeed the Group itself were struggling to compose viable senior competitions. The Wests JL had fielded varying 5–7 team A Grade competitions since 1997, with all games being played at the same venue. Furthermore, some years had seen Wests A Grade teams have to travel to the Canterbury or Parramatta Junior Leagues to compete. Group 6 had split into the haves and have nots, with the disparity of player payments at first producing an uneven competition, before the non-competitive clubs were forced into the DNC Cup. By 2007, Group 6 1st Grade competition (competed for by 12 senior clubs in 1992) had reduced to 5 teams. The Reserve Grade competition was as equally effected.

Various overtures were made between the governing bodies to seek an agreement as to forming a joint competition from 2005 onwards. For whatever reasons, agreement was unable to be reached for some time. Following the end of the 2008 season, both areas took votes with regard to rejoining of the old competition. While the clubs of the Wests JL agreed, Group 6 clubs voted against.

==== 2009–10: The Combined Competition: A New Era Commences or does it? ====
After years of senior Rugby League decline in both the former Campbelltown area of the Group and the Group itself, the NSWRL and CRL agreed to form a joint senior competition for the Wests Junior League and Group 6 areas. This competition involved ten 1st Grade clubs. Picton Magpies RLFC under the coaching of local junior and former Wests Magpies NRL Second Rower Gary Dowse claimed the first reunified premiership with a 26–12 triumph over arch-rivals Thirlmere Roosters at Kirkham Park, Camden. The combined competition fielded 54 teams in 1st Grade, Reserve Grade, 3rd Grade and through four U/18 divisions.

While the competition had its detractors, local and State League administrators viewed the reunification as a vital bulwark against the impending threat from the AFL as it seeks to establish a second team supported by Western Sydney.

Moss Vale Dragons secured the 2010 1st Grade premiership with a nail-biting 6–2 defeat of defending premiers Picton Magpies at Campbelltown Stadium. Captain- coached by Kiwi import Willie McDonald, the red n whites broke a 20-year 1st Grade premiership drought.

==== 2011: CRL Group 6: The Combined Competition trial ends ====
In a major boilover, Oakdale Workers would claim their second first grade title with a heart-stopping 24–16 victory over the heavily fancied East Campbelltown Eagles team at Kirkham Park.

==== 2012–20: Final Years in the CRL ====
2012 saw the East Campbelltown Eagles take that one step further from only suffering two losses in the 2011 season, one of those losses was the 2011 Grand Final against Oakdale, the Eagles blitzed the competition going through undefeated and winning the 2012 Grand Final defeating Thirlmere 44–10, The club also claimed the CRL Claytons Cup which hadn't been won by a Group 6 Club since Mittagong had won the cup in 1991.

The Picton Magpies RLFC would assert their dominance over the competition coming from nowhere in 2013 to beat Minor Premiers Mittagong in the final at Kirkham Park. Mittagong will forever live with the heartache and a rue a late missed conversion from adjacent to the uprights which would’ve sent the game into extra time. Picton would then defend their title in 2014 in Victoria Park in a final rematch with Mittagong. This would be the last time in the modern era that the Group 6 Grand Final would be played at one of the local grounds and not Campbelltown Stadium. 2015 would see Picton complete a hattrick of premierships with a Grand Final day drubbing of Camden. The chant rang out from the Campbelltown Stadium stands "Ram Soup", as Camden would lose all 3 major grades that day. 2016 would be the end of the Magpie dominance with Camden running out winners 14–12 in the season finale at Campbelltown Stadium and in the process ending the clubs 14 year winless run.

In a major boil over The Campbelltown City Kangaroos wiped the floor with the highly fancied Thirlmere Roosters in a night time grand final at Campbelltown Stadium. It was the 11th premiership for the 1908 club and a 34-year drought that was broken by the Roos after they rejoined the competition in 2009 through the combined competition.

Picton would return to the summit of the group 6 competition with their 4th premiership in 6 years, this time defeating an Oaks Tigers team making their first Grand Finals in 16 years. They ended up not winning the grand final.

Picton would make their 6th Grand Final in 7 years and would face their local rivals Thirlmere Roosters, who were appearing in their first grand final in 11 years. The Roosters would hold the trophy at the end of the day winning an amazing shootout 38–36 on the back of their captain coach Jake Mullaney.

==== 2020–present: Competition joins NSWRL ====
With the Country Rugby League being dissolved and absorbed into the NSWRL, Group 6 became part of the NSWRL in 2020.

A modified season interrupted by COVID-19. There were 2 clear standouts in the drastically shortened season, The 2019 Defending Premiers - Thirlmere Roosters and The Oakdale Workers. Amazingly Thirlmere who were reduced to 12 men after a sickening high shot held off the Oakdale team to record back to back premierships.

=== Macarthur Division Rugby League Era ===
==== 2021–present: New name, New Clubs ====
In 2021, the competition was officially renamed the Macarthur Division Rugby League.

Campbelltown Collegians and East Campbelltown Eagles joined competition, but the COVID-19 lockdowns saw the early cancellation of the competition's inaugural season under its new name.

== 1st Grade Premiers ==
Year	Premiers	Score	Runners-up	Match Information
Year	Premiers	Score	Runners-up	Date	Venue	Referee
Berrima District Rugby League Premiership (1914–31, 1937–45)
1914	Robertson Reds	5 – 0	Moss Vale Blues	12 September 1914	Moss Vale Showground, Moss Vale	A. Norton
1915	No Competition Due to World War I
1916	No Competition Due to World War I
1917	No Competition Due to World War I
1918	No Competition Due to World War I
1919	(2) Robertson Reds	8 – 3	Bowral Two Blues	30 August 1919	Moss Vale Showground, Moss Vale	T. McIntosh
1920	Moss Vale Blues	18 – 0	Robertson Reds	4 September 1920	Moss Vale Showground, Moss Vale	D. Frowley
1921	(3) Robertson Reds	11 – 7	Moss Vale Blues	17 September 1921	Moss Vale Showground, Moss Vale	T. McMahon
1922	(4) Robertson Reds	13 – 7	Moss Vale Blues	9 September 1922	Moss Vale Showground, Moss Vale	T. Dickenson
1923	(5) Robertson Reds	5 – 0	Moss Vale Blues	1 September 1923	Moss Vale Showground, Moss Vale	J. Black
1924	(6) Robertson Reds	3 – 0	Bargo	2 August 1924	Moss Vale Showground, Moss Vale	J. Black
1925	(2) Moss Vale Blues	10 – 8	Bargo	15 August 1925	Loseby Park, Bowral	M. Brannaghan
1926	Bowral Two Blues	5 – 3	Robertson Reds	14 August 1926	Moss Vale Showground, Moss Vale	F. Delaney
1927	(3) Moss Vale Blues	3 – 2	Bowral Two Blues	10 September 1927	Loseby Park, Bowral	E. Buckley
1928	(4) Moss Vale Blues	5 – 0	Bowral Two Blues	22 September 1928	Moss Vale Showground, Moss Vale	R. Drake
1929	(5) Moss Vale Blues	15 – 3	Burrawang	5 October 1929	Moss Vale Showground, Moss Vale
1930	(6) Moss Vale Blues	No Grand Final	Bowral Two Blues
1931	No Group Competition
Group 6 Premiership (1932–36, 1946–20)
1932	No Group Competition
1933	No Group Competition
1934	No Group Competition
1935	Picton Magpies	27 – 6	Bowral Blues	18 August 1935	Mittagong Sports Ground, Mittagong
1936	No Group Competition
Berrima District Rugby League Premiership (1914–31, 1937–45)
1937	(2) Bowral Blues	23 – 0	Mittagong Greens	10 July 1937	Loseby Park, Bowral	J. O'Malley
1938	Mittagong Greens	No Grand Final	Robertson-Burrawang Reds*
1939	No Group Competition
1940	No Group Competition
1941	No Competition Due to World War II
1942	No Competition Due to World War II
1943	No Competition Due to World War II
1944	(3) Bowral Blues	13 – 5	Mittagong Greens	17 September 1944	Loseby Park, Bowral
1945	(2) Mittagong Greens	7 – 2	Robertson-Burrawang Reds	19 August 1945	Loseby Park, Bowral	A. Taplin
Group 6 Premiership (1932–36, 1946–20)
1946	Campbelltown Kangaroos	20 – 9	Bowral Blues	4 August 1946	Victoria Park, Picton	A. Taplin
1947	(4) Bowral Blues	13 – 10	Campbelltown Kangaroos	10 August 1947	Moss Vale Showground, Moss Vale	G. Henry
1948	Camden Rams	15 – 15	Bowral Blues	1 August 1948	Victoria Park, Picton	K. Couch
1948	Camden Rams	14 – 5	Bowral Blues	8 August 1948	Victoria Park, Picton	K. Couch
1949	(2) Campbelltown Kangaroos	18 – 10	Bowral Blues	25 September 1949	Mittagong Sports Ground, Mittagong	A. Grew
1950	(5) Bowral Blues	22 – 5	Wingecarribee Reds	17 September 1950	Mittagong Sports Ground, Mittagong	Wilson
1951	(2) Camden Rams	20 – 0	Picton Magpies	26 August 1951	Victoria Park, Picton	L. Warren
1952	(6) Bowral Blues	12 – 5	Picton Magpies	14 September 1952	Mittagong Sports Ground, Mittagong	D. Cohen
1953	(7) Moss Vale Dragons	9 – 7	Picton Magpies	23 August 1953	Mittagong Sports Ground, Mittagong	D. Cohen
1954	(7) Bowral Blues	14 – 8	Camden Rams	5 September 1954	Victoria Park, Picton	W. Kerr
1955	(8) Moss Vale Dragons	13 – 12	Bowral Blues
1956	(8) Bowral Blues	10 – 0	Moss Vale Dragons
1957	(9) Bowral Blues	42 – 0	Camden Rams
1958	(10) Bowral Blues	10 – 7	Mittagong Lions
1959	(3) Mittagong Lions	6 – 5	Moss Vale Dragons
1960	(11) Bowral Blues	11 – 4	Moss Vale Dragons
1961	(12) Bowral Blues	24 – 3	Robertson-Burrawang Spuddies
1962	(4) Mittagong Lions	12 – 7	Campbelltown Kangaroos
1963	(5) Mittagong Lions	18 – 11	Campbelltown Kangaroos
1964	(6) Mittagong Lions	8 – 2	Bowral Blues
1965	(13) Bowral Blues	14 – 3	Campbelltown Kangaroos
1966	(2) Picton Magpies	7 – 0	Mittagong Lions
1967	(7) Mittagong Lions	8 – 0	Picton Magpies
1968	(14) Bowral Blues	4 – 2	Mittagong Lions
1969	(3) Campbelltown City Kangaroos	22 – 3	Bowral Blues
1970	(4) Campbelltown City Kangaroos	6 – 4	Oakdale Workers
1971	(5) Campbelltown City Kangaroos	15 – 13	Campbelltown RSL Warriors
1972	Campbelltown RSL Warriors	21 – 12	Camden Rams
1973	(6) Campbelltown City Kangaroos	21 – 3	Campbelltown Collegians
1974	(7) Campbelltown City Kangaroos	23 – 9	Ingleburn Bulldogs
1975	(8) Campbelltown City Kangaroos	12 – 8	Ingleburn Bulldogs
1976	The Oaks Tigers	16 – 10	Camden Rams
1977	(2) The Oaks Tigers	22 – 3	Camden Rams
1978	(3) Camden Rams	5 – 2	Campbelltown RSL Warriors
1979	(2) Campbelltown RSL Warriors	9 – 0	Camden Rams
1980	(9) Campbelltown City Kangaroos	25 – 9	Picton Magpies
1981	(3) Picton Magpies	15 – 11	Campbelltown City Kangaroos
1982	(9) Moss Vale Dragons	10 – 6	Campbelltown City Kangaroos
1983	(10) Campbelltown City Kangaroos	24 – 6	The Oaks Tigers
1984	(10) Moss Vale Dragons	36 – 12	Camden Rams
1985	(4) Picton Magpies	16 – 8	Moss Vale Dragons
1986	(5) Picton Magpies	8 – 7	Camden Rams
1987	(6) Picton Magpies	26 – 16	Mittagong Lions
1988	(8) Mittagong Lions	18 – 17	Bowral Blues
1989	Warragamba Wombats	22 – 12	Oakdale Workers
1990	(11) Moss Vale Dragons	20 – 12	Mittagong Lions
1991	(9) Mittagong Lions	10 – 6	Oakdale Workers
1992	(3) The Oaks Tigers	14 – 4	Picton Magpies
1993	Oakdale Workers	29 – 14	Camden Rams
1994	(4) Camden Rams	26 – 4	Appin Warriors
1995	(10) Mittagong Lions	12 – 11	Narellan Jets
1996	Narellan Jets	40 – 8	Thirlmere-Tahmoor Roosters
1997	(5) Camden Rams	27 – 21	Picton Magpies
1998	(6) Camden Rams	23 – 16	The Oaks Tigers
1999	(7) Picton Magpies	20 – 0	The Oaks Tigers
2000	(7) Camden Rams	26 – 16	Picton Magpies
2001	Thirlmere-Tahmoor Roosters	19 – 16	Oakdale Workers	8 September 2001	Victoria Park, Picton
2002	(8) Camden Rams	29 – 10	The Oaks Tigers	25 August 2002	Kirkham Park, Sydney
2003	(2) Thirlmere-Tahmoor Roosters	32 – 16	Camden Rams
2004	(2) Narellan Jets	24 – 16	Camden Rams
2005	(8) Picton Magpies	28 – 22	Camden Rams
2006	(3) Thirlmere-Tahmoor Roosters	6 – 0	Picton Magpies
2007	Goulburn Stockmen	36 – 26	Thirlmere-Tahmoor Roosters
2008	(4) Thirlmere-Tahmoor Roosters	19 – 16	Oakdale Workers
2009	(9) Picton Magpies	26 – 12	Thirlmere-Tahmoor Roosters
2010	(12) Moss Vale Dragons	6 – 2	Picton Magpies	18 September 2010	Campbelltown Sports Stadium	M.Middleton
2011	(2) Oakdale Workers	24 – 16	East Campbelltown Eagles			D. Briscoe
2012	Campbelltown Eagles	44 – 10	Thirlmere-Tahmoor Roosters			T. Cini
2013	(10) Picton Magpies	24 – 22	Mittagong Lions	15 September 2013	Kirkham Park, Sydney	T. Cini
2014	(11) Picton Magpies	36 – 4	Mittagong Lions	14 September 2014	Victoria Park, Picton
2015	(12) Picton Magpies	46 – 0	Camden Rams	13 September 2015	Campbelltown Sports Stadium, Sydney
2016	(9) Camden Rams	14 – 12	Picton Magpies	17 September 2016	Campbelltown Sports Stadium, Sydney
2017	(11) Campbelltown City Kangaroos	30 – 8	Thirlmere-Tahmoor Roosters	17 September 2017	Campbelltown Sports Stadium, Sydney	A. Sheldrick
2018	(13) Picton Magpies	22 – 10	The Oaks Tigers	16 September 2018	Campbelltown Sports Stadium, Sydney	A. Sheldrick
2019	(5) Thirlmere-Tahmoor Roosters	38 – 36	Picton Magpies	15 September 2019	Campbelltown Sports Stadium, Sydney	A. Sheldrick
2020	(6) Thirlmere-Tahmoor Roosters	33 – 22	Oakdale Workers	27 September 2020	Campbelltown Sports Stadium, Sydney	D. Perry
Macarthur Conference Premiership (2021–Present)
2021	(7) Thirlmere-Tahmoor Roosters	No Grand Final	Oakdale Workers
2022	(10) Camden Rams	30 – 4	East Campbelltown Eagles	11 September 2022	Campbelltown Sports Stadium, Sydney	A. Sheldrick
2023	(8) Thirlmere-Tahmoor Roosters	28 – 26	Camden Rams	17 September 2023	Campbelltown Sports Stadium, Sydney	A. Sheldrick
2024	(11) Camden Rams	38-26	The Oaks Tigers	15 September 2024	Campbelltown Sports Stadium, Sydney	A. Sheldrick
2025	(12) Camden Rams	32-26	Campbelltown Collegians	21 September 2025	Campbelltown Sports Stadium, Sydney	M.Middleton
2026	(13) Camden Rams	38-30	Campbelltown Collegians	20 September 2026	Campbelltown Sports Stadium, Sydney	N/A

Team	Winners	Runners-up	Years won	Years runner-up
Bowral Blues	14	12	1926, 1937, 1944, 1947, 1950, 1952, 1954, 1956, 1957, 1958, 1960, 1961, 1965, 1968	1919, 1927, 1928, 1930, 1935, 1946, 1948, 1949, 1955, 1964, 1969, 1988
Picton Magpies	13	12	1935, 1966, 1981, 1985, 1986, 1987, 1999, 2005, 2009, 2013, 2014, 2015, 2018	1951, 1952, 1953, 1967, 1980, 1992, 1997, 2000, 2006, 2010, 2016, 2019
Moss Vale Dragons	12	8	1920, 1925, 1927, 1928, 1929, 1930, 1953, 1955, 1982, 1984, 1990, 2010	1914, 1921, 1922, 1923, 1956, 1959, 1960, 1985
Campbelltown City Kangaroos	11	6	1946, 1949, 1969, 1970, 1971, 1973, 1974, 1975, 1980, 1983, 2017	1947, 1962, 1963, 1965, 1981, 1982
Camden Rams	10	14	1948, 1951, 1978, 1994, 1997, 1998, 2000, 2002, 2016, 2022, 2024	1954, 1957, 1972, 1976, 1977, 1979, 1984, 1986, 1993, 2003, 2004, 2005, 2015, 2023
Mittagong Lions	10	9	1938, 1945, 1959, 1962, 1963, 1964, 1967, 1988, 1991, 1995	1937, 1944, 1958, 1966, 1968, 1987, 1990, 2013, 2014
Thirlmere-Tahmoor Roosters	8	5	2001, 2003, 2006, 2008, 2019, 2020, 2021, 2023	1996, 2007, 2009, 2012, 2017
Robertson Reds	6	2	1914, 1919, 1921, 1922, 1923, 1924	1920, 1926
The Oaks Tigers	3	5	1976, 1977, 1992	1983, 1998, 1999, 2002, 2018, 2024
Oakdale Workers	2	7	1993, 2011	1970, 1989, 1991, 2001, 2008, 2020, 2021
Campbelltown Warriors	2	2	1972, 1979	1971, 1978
Narellan Jets	2	1	1996, 2004	1995
Robertson-Burrawang Spuddies	1	2	1938	1945, 1961
East Campbelltown Eagles	1	2	2012	2011, 2022
Warragamba Wombats	1	0	1989	–
Goulburn Stockmen	1	0	2007	–
Bargo Bunnies	0	2	–	1924, 1925
Ingleburn Bulldogs	0	2	–	1974, 1975
Burrawang	0	1	–	1929
Wingecarribee Reds	0	1	–	1950
Campbelltown Collegians	0	2	–	1973, 2025
Appin Dogs	0	1	–	1994

== Matchday ==
A successful U/18s League also forms part of the senior Sunday matchday in Group 6/Macarthur Division. Gameday normally follows this schedule:

- 11.30 am: U/18s
- 1.00 pm: Reserve Grade
- 2.30 pm: 1st Grade

== Group 6 Junior League ==
Locations of the Group 6 Senior clubs (current in black).

The following clubs in field teams in the Group 6 junior competition which runs competitions from the U/6s to U/16s. Fixtures are played of a Saturday from early April until September.

- Thirlmere-Tahmoor Roosters
- Moss Vale Dragons
- Camden Rams
- Picton Magpies
- Narellan Jets
- The Oaks JRLFC*
- Appin Dogs
- Oran Park Gregory Hills Chargers
- Mount Annan-Currans Hill Knights
- Mittagong Lions
- Warragamba Wombats
- Bowral Kookaburras
- Robertson Spuddies
- Bargo Bunnies

* Oakdale Workers RLFC do not field a junior division due to their close proximity to The Oaks Tigers JRLFC. Junior Rugby League in this area was once played by the now defunct Burragorang JRLFC until the late 1980s

== Memorable Facts/ Unique Stories ==
- Opposition players in the deep colds of Robertson would quite often resort to drinking nips of rum pre-game to keep warm.
- Robertson's field is in fact on the private farm of the famous Hindmarsh family.
- A Group 6 representative team coached by Ray Corkery defeated the French touring team 2–0 at Orana Park, Campbelltown in 1975 after a power outage caused the floodlights to fail.
- The New South Wales Department of Corrective Services allowed Berrima Gaol ('The Colts') to field a team in the Second Division competition from 1975 to 1979. Captain- coached by Ingleburn Bulldogs junior Kevin Holland, this real life team of 'Longest Yarders' claimed the 1975 & 1977 (undefeated) Second Division premierships. In an irony, this team was the best conditioned of any Group 6 team at the time living a professional athlete's life of strength training, cardio conditioning, ball sessions and a rigid, non- alcohol diet (except after matches apparently!) all at the expense of HMG. Berrima defeated Moss Vale 15–13 in the 1975 2nd Division decider and Macquarie Fields 22–11 in the 1977 decider. The Gaol fielded a team in the 1st Division Reserve Grade competition of 1976, qualifying for the preliminary final of that competition before succumbing 18–11 to eventual premiers Ingleburn Bulldogs RLFC.
- Group 6 fielded a 3rd Division competition for the only time in 1981 with Cross Roads Hotel defeating Minto Cobras 28–8 in the Grand Final.
- Picton in 1966, Mittagong in 1991 and Campbelltown Eagles in 2012 are the only Group 6 teams to have won the Clayton Cup, awarded for being Country Rugby League's team of the year. All three teams won their Premierships with undefeated records.
- Picton were on track for a consecutive undefeated season and Clayton Cup in 1967 until defeated 8-nil by John Cole's Mittagong team in a massive Grand Final boilover.
- Picton were on the winning side though in the 1985 Grand Final when they defeated Moss Vale 16–8 at Kirkham Park, Camden. This was only two weeks after being decimated 42–8 in the major semi by Moss Vale.
- Ron Kain is Group 6's most successful ever player, playing in 7 Grand Final winning teams (Campbelltown City 69, 70, 71, 73, 74, 75 & Picton 81)
- No club has won 4 consecutive grand finals in Group 6. The closest team to this feat was Picton 2016, defeated 14–12 by Camden Rams in the Grand Final. Campbelltown City in 1972 & 1976 and Picton in 1988 were bundled out in the preliminary final of those respective seasons gunning for four straight titles.
- Campbelltown City in 1975 and Camden Rams in 2016 are the only clubs to win all 3 Grades in the same year- U/18s, Reserve Grade & First Grade however, Camden also won the Ladies' LeagueTag title in 2016 making them the only club to win all 4 premier premierships in one year.
- Particularly sweet for City supporters and officials in 1975 was the 40–0 defeat of their local rivals Campbelltown Collegians in the Reserve Grade Grand Final.
- After being wooden spooners in 1979, Campbelltown City claimed the 1980 premiership with a dominant season in which they lost only two games. They remain the only Group 6 club to have gone from last to first in one season. City defeated Picton in the GF of that year 25–9.
- Ex-Australian Kangaroos and ex-Wests Tigers coach Tim Sheens captained the Campbelltown City Kangaroos to the 1st Grade premiership in 1983 with a 24–6 defeat of The Oaks Tigers, C'town City's last match in Group 6.

== See also ==
- Rugby League Competitions in Australia
- New South Wales Rugby League
- Country Rugby League
- List of Country Rugby League clubs in New South Wales by competition

== External links and Sources ==
- Group 6 Country Rugby League – official Group 6 site
- Group 6 on Country Rugby League's official site
- Group 6 Forum- Wests Magpies Supporters Forum
- The Biz (Fairfield, NSW : 1928 – 1972) at Trove
- Camden News (Camden, NSW : 1895 – 1954) at Trove
- The Picton Post (Picton, NSW : 1907 – 1954) at Trove
- The Scrutineer and Berrima District Press (Moss Vale, NSW : 1892 – 1948) at Trove
- The Southern Mail (Bowral, NSW : 1889 – 1954) at Trove
- Rugby League Week at State Library of NSW Research and Collections
