= Mascot, New South Wales =

Mascot
- Suburb
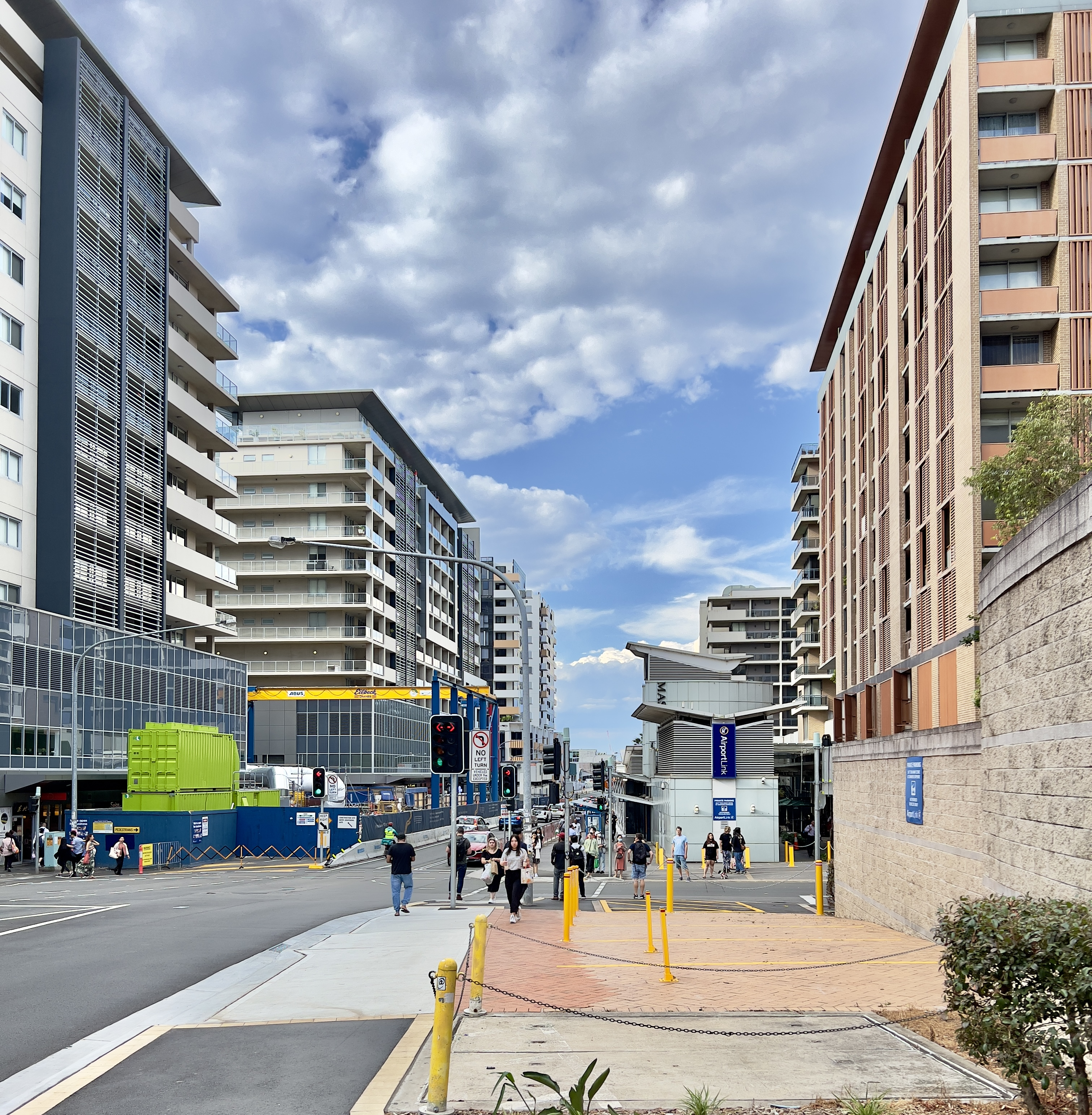
- Bourke Road (2022)

- Interactive map of Mascot
- Coordinates: 33°55′45″S 151°11′17″E
- Country: Australia
- State: New South Wales
- City: Sydney
- LGA: Bayside Council, Inner West Council (minor)
- Location: 7 km (4.3 mi) from Sydney CBD
- Established: 1911

Government
  - State electorate: Heffron
  - Federal division: Kingsford Smith

Area
  - Total: 9.2 km^{2} (3.6 sq mi)
- Elevation: 10 m (33 ft)

Population
  - Total: 21,591 (2021 census)
  - Density: 1,605.7/km^{2} (4,159/sq mi)
- Postcode: 2020
Suburbs around Mascot
St Peters	Alexandria	Rosebery
Sydenham	Mascot	Eastlakes
Tempe	Kyeemagh	Botany

Mascot is an inner south suburb of Sydney, in the state of New South Wales, Australia. Mascot is located 7 kilometres (4.3 miles) south of the Sydney central business district and is one of the administrative centres of the Bayside Council. A small part of Mascot is located in the Inner West Council. Mascot is on the northwest side of Botany Bay and contains Sydney Airport.

== History ==
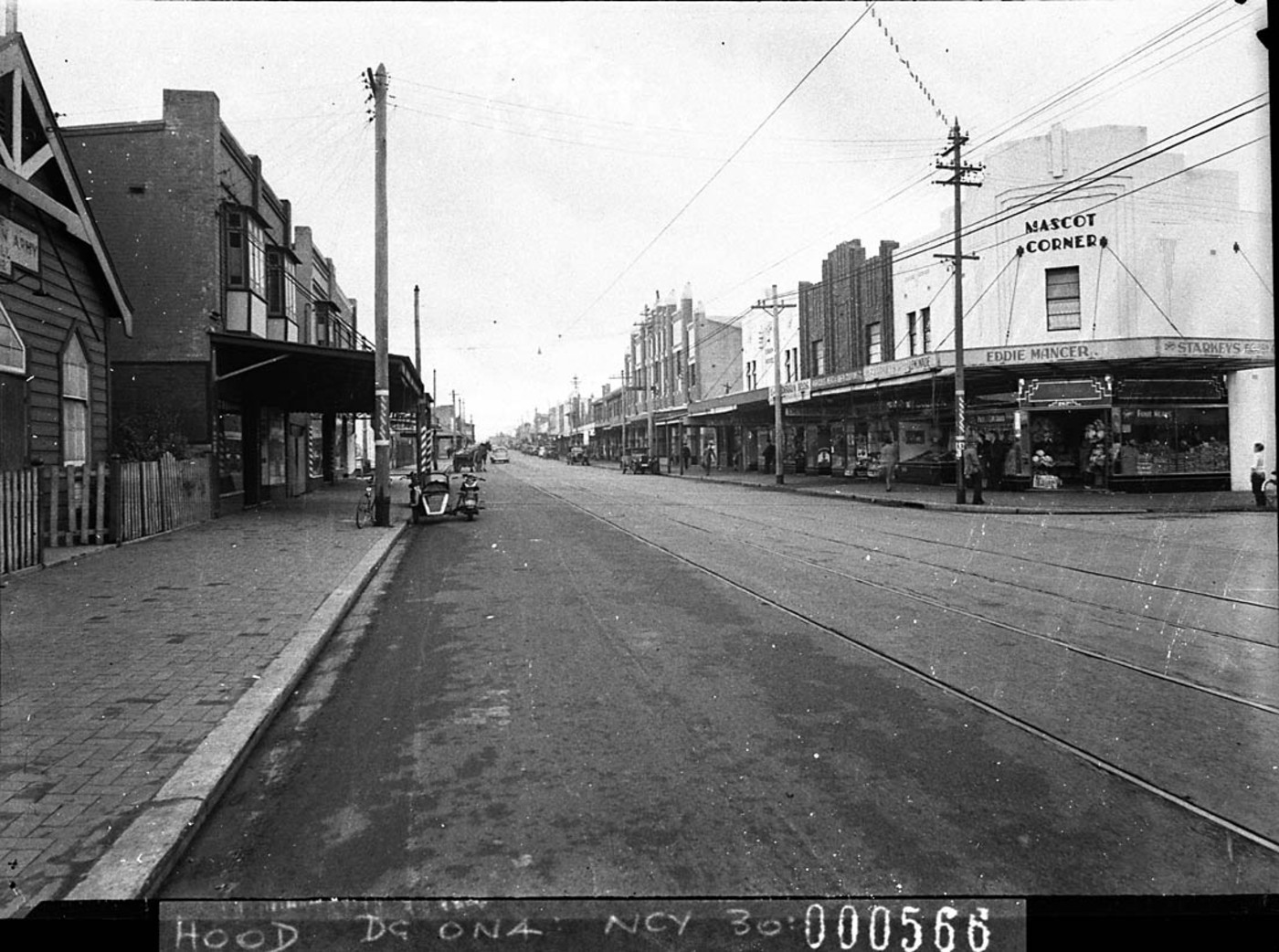
Botany Road, Mascot in 1938

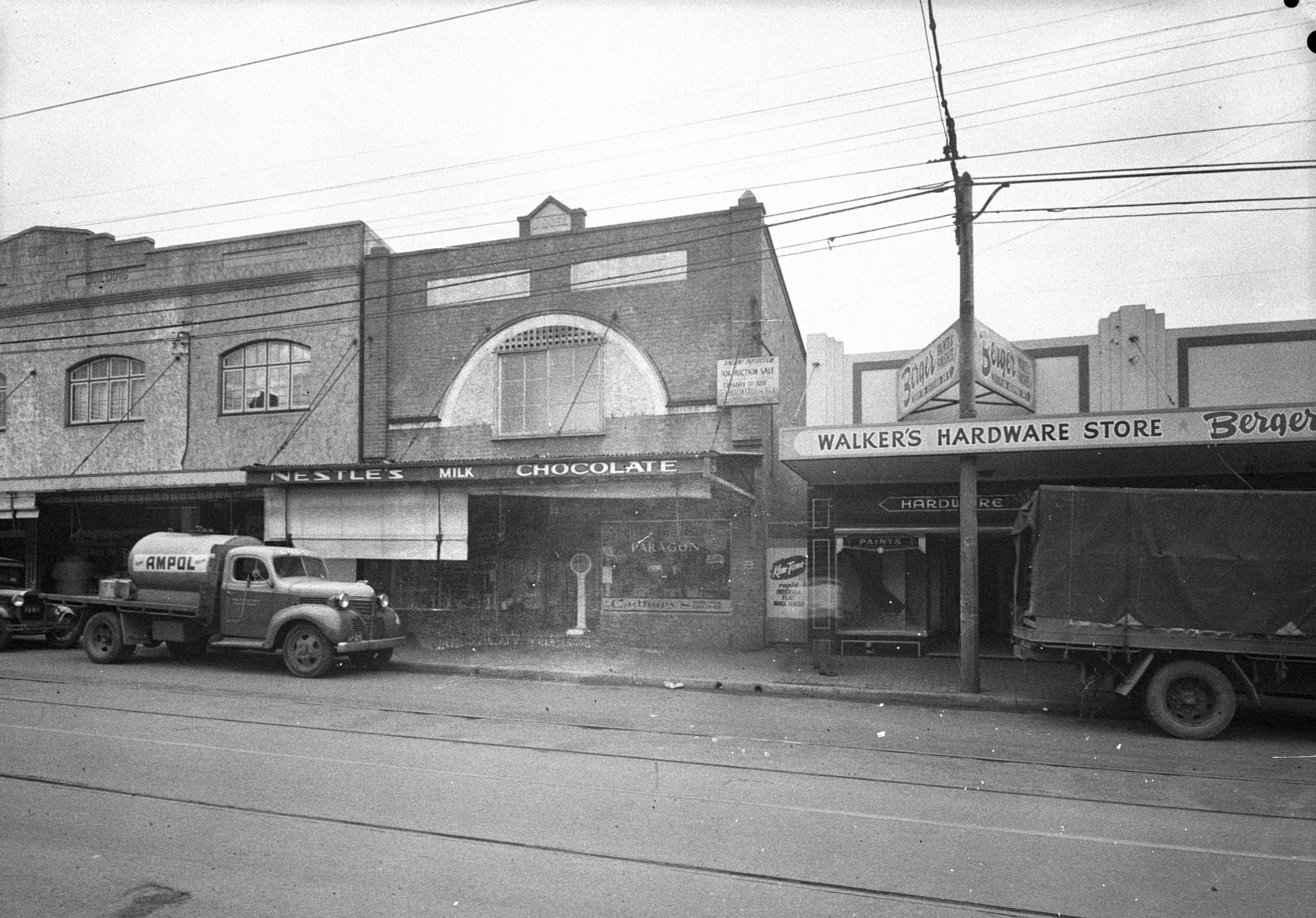
Botany Road, Mascot in July 1951

The first land grants in the area were made in 1835, with market gardening being the main land use. Subdivision followed the construction of Botany Road in 1875 and a municipality known as North Botany was formed in 1888. A racecourse operated in this area in 1904 on land that was formerly owned by the Australian Golf Club. The race course was known as Ascot, named after its famous counterpart in England. Residents wanted the area to have an individual identity and a referendum was held in 1911 to choose between Ascot, and Booralee. An objection from the postal authorities to the use of 'Ascot' led the council to alter the name to Mascot.

In 1920, Mascot was chosen as the site of a public airfield. Nigel Love was leasing 200 acres (81 ha; 0.81 km^{2}) from the Kensington Race club and in 1921 the Commonwealth Government purchased 161 acres (65 ha; 0.65 km^{2}) for this purpose. The first regular flights began in 1924. The suburb became the headquarters of Qantas as its hub in 1935. The Cooks River was diverted away from the area between 1947 and 1953 to provide more land for the airport.

In the early 1970s a large meeting of residents successfully requested that the NSW Builders Labourers Federation place a green ban on the construction of town-house type dwellings if there was not sufficient green area retained around them.

== Heritage listings ==
Mascot has a number of heritage-listed sites, including: 1024 Botany Road: Botany Water Reserves and General Holmes Drive: Sewage Pumping Station 38.

== Commercial area ==
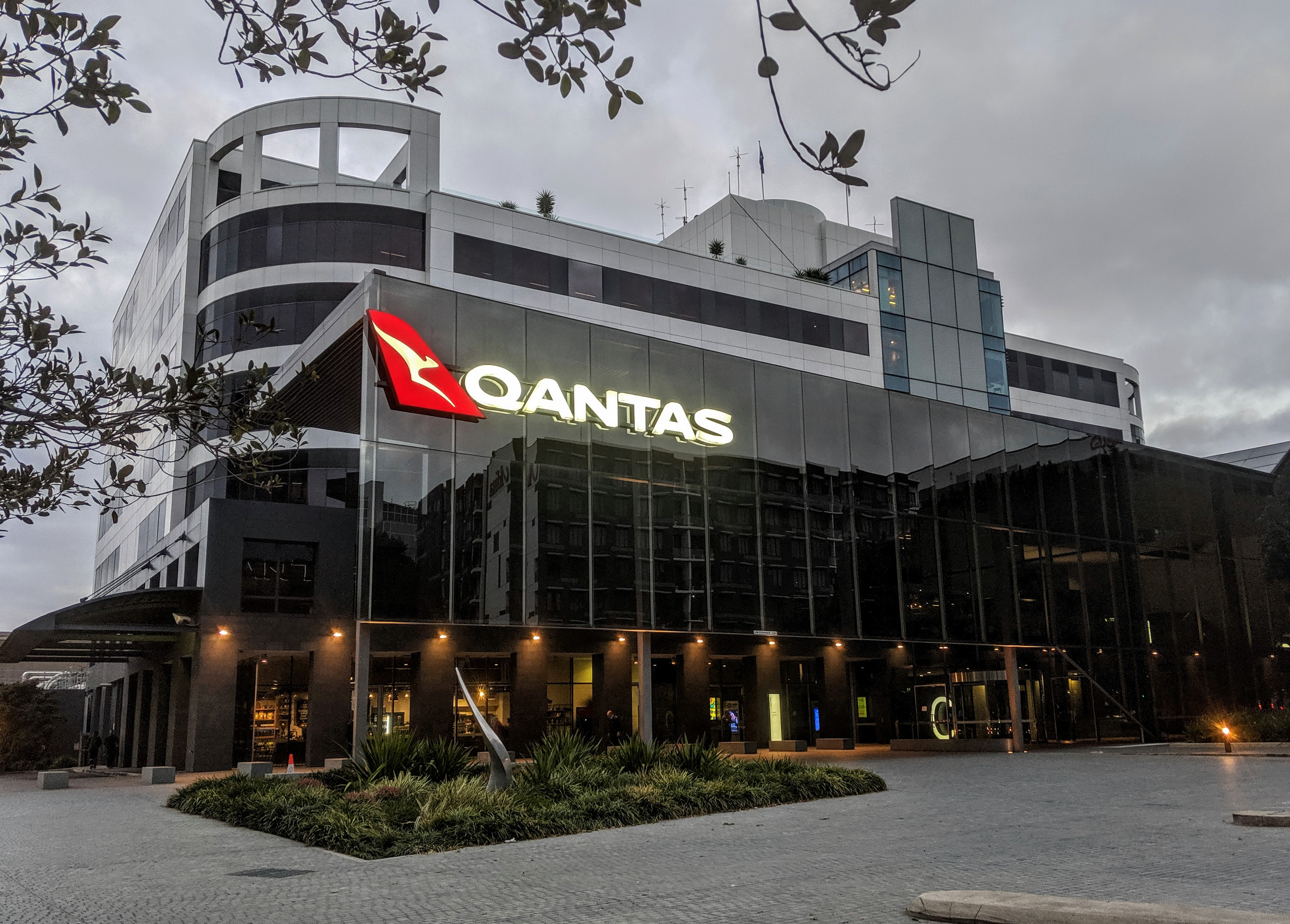
Qantas head office

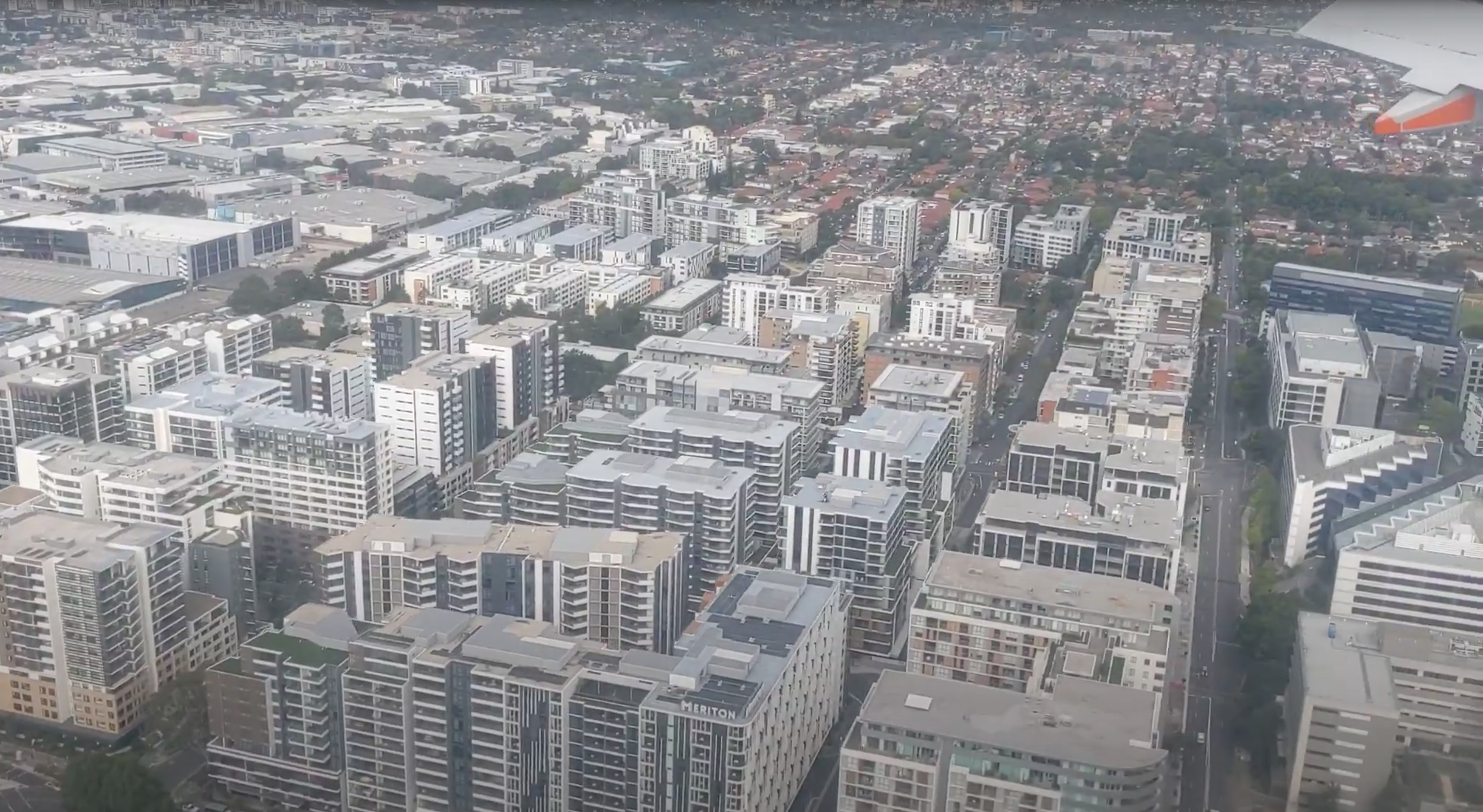
View over Mascot while landing at Sydney Airport

Mascot has a mixture of residential, commercial and industrial areas. The main shopping centre is located on Botany Road. The area around Mascot railway station is being redeveloped to contain high-density commercial and residential developments. The Police Headquarters for the local Botany Bay Area Command is on Botany Road and Mascot Ambulance Station is situated directly opposite. Mascot Fire Station is located in Coward Street, beside the City of Botany Bay Council Chambers.

Sydney Airport, Australia's principal airport, is an influential presence and key employer. The head office of Qantas is the Qantas Centre at 203 Coward Street in Mascot. There are also a number of airport hotels in the suburb.

== Transport ==
Mascot is serviced by a number of bus routes, which are operated by Transdev John Holland and Transit Systems. Routes 303, 306, 309, 310 and 350, routes travel down Botany Road. Routes 343 and 358 services travel down Gardeners Road and route 305 departs from the Qantas Centre.

The suburb is served by three railway stations on the Airport & South Line. Mascot railway station is located in the residential and business area of the suburb. The International and Domestic railway stations are situated below the respective terminals of the airport. The Sydenham to Botany branch of the Metropolitan Goods railway line passes through the suburb and includes a yard in Mascot.

Recent improvements to Kingsford-Smith Airport have resulted in the creation of a bicycle path between Mascot (Coward Street) and the M5 East Freeway at Arncliffe. Other bike paths pass through Mascot to Botany Bay, the University of New South Wales and the Sydney CBD.

== Population ==
At the 2021 census, the population of Mascot was 21,591, of which 35.1% were born in Australia. The most common foreign countries of birth were China 11.4%, Indonesia 9.8%, Mongolia 2.6%, India 2.6% and Ireland 2.2%. Some 37.9% of people only spoke English at home. Other languages spoken at home included Mandarin 12.5%, Indonesian 8.3%, Cantonese 4.2%, Spanish 3.8% and Greek 2.7%. The most common responses for religion were No Religion 34.7% and Catholic 23.5%. Of occupied private dwellings in Mascot, 74.3% were flats or apartments; 21.0% were separate houses; and 3.9% were semi-detached, row- or terrace houses, townhouses etc.

== Notable people ==
- Jim Breen, rugby league player
- Thomas Bulch, musician
- Mick Craigie, rugby league player
- Eric Cremin, golfer
- Ron Hoenig, barrister and politician
- Tom Howard, golfer
- Amber Lawrence, musician
- Jack Lindwall, rugby league player
- Ray Lindwall, Test cricketer and rugby league player
- George Piggins, rugby league player and administrator
- Amber-Jade Sanderson, politician
- Sione Tovo, rugby league player

== Politics ==
Mascot is in the safe Labor federal electoral division of Kingsford Smith, which has been held by Matt Thistlethwaite since 2013.

Mascot is in the safe Labor state electorate of Heffron, which has been held by Ron Hoenig since 2012.

== Schools ==
Mascot Public School is a primary school in King Street and J. J. Cahill Memorial High School is located in Sutherland Street.

St Therese School Mascot is located in Sutherland Street.

Gardeners Road Primary school is on the Rosebery side of Gardeners Road, but attracts a number of students from Mascot.

== Places of worship ==
- Knox Presbyterian Church built in 1911
- Self-Realization Fellowship Sydney Centre
- St Catherine's Greek Orthodox Church

== Parks and recreation ==
L'Estrange Park is home to both the Mascot Kings (soccer) and the Mascot Juniors rugby league teams. Mascot Oval is the venue for the Mascot Juniors' home games. The Lakes Golf Club has hosted many international golf tournaments.

== Gallery ==
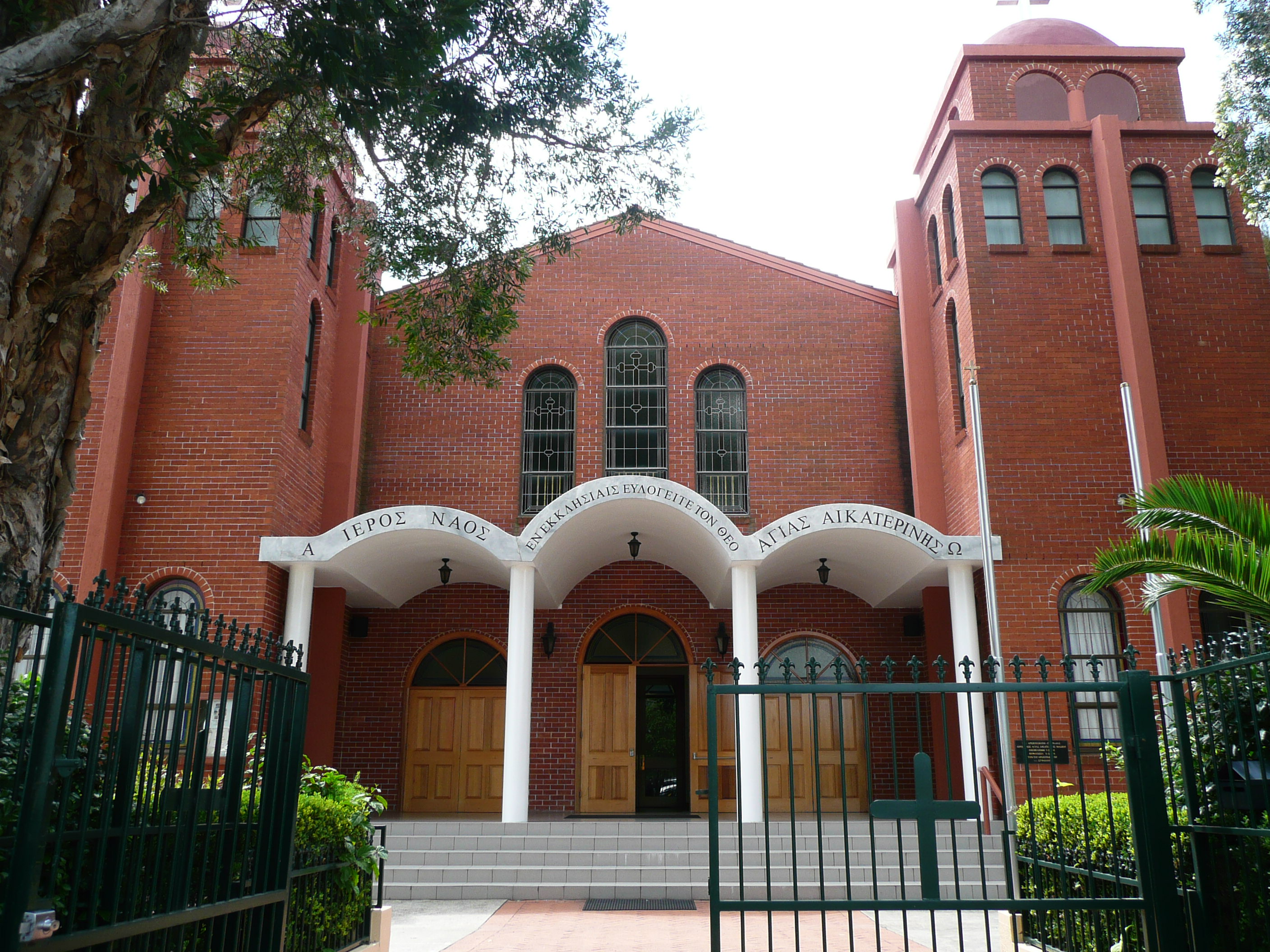
St Catherine's Greek Orthodox Church, Coward Street

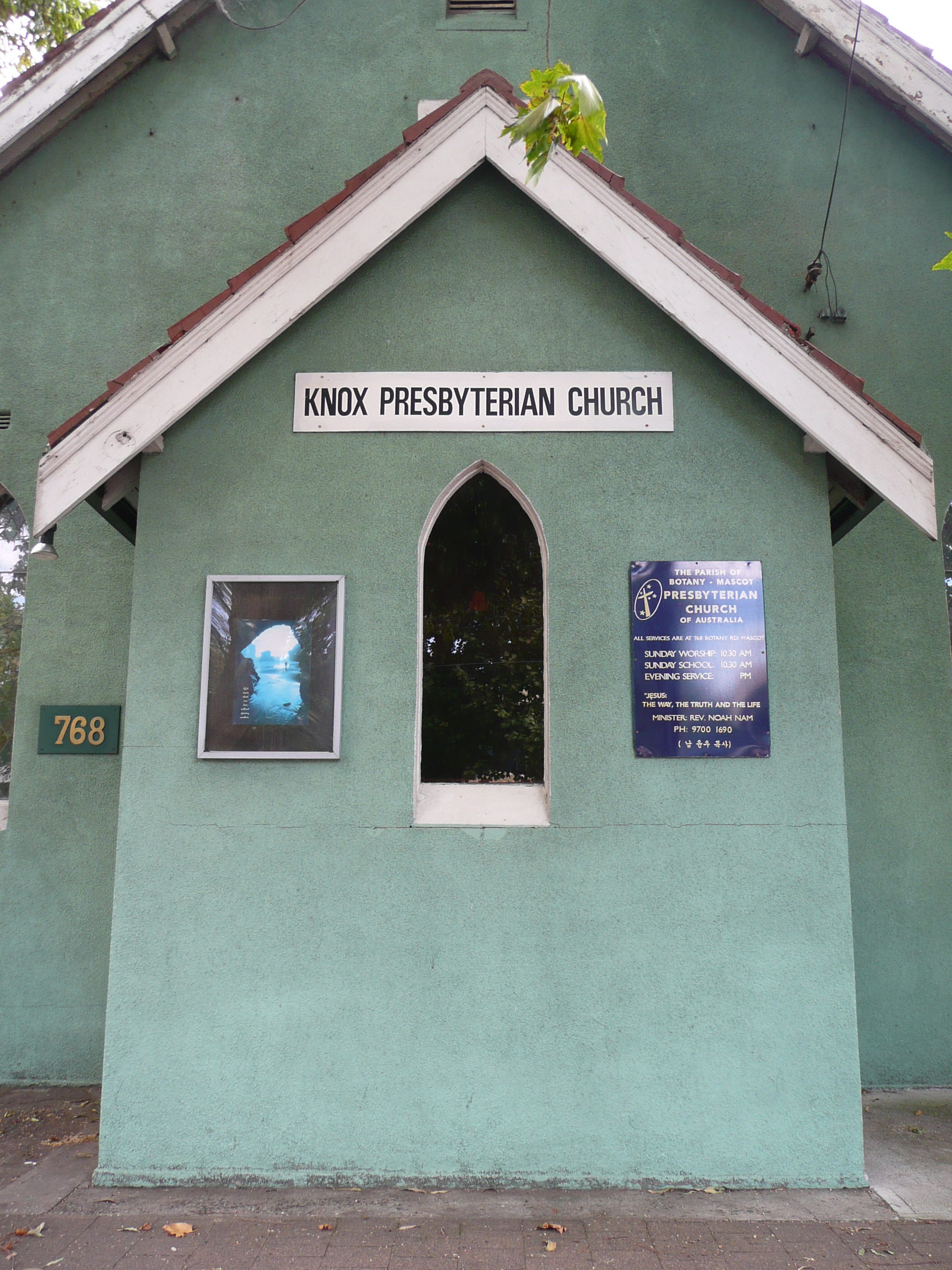
Knox Presbyterian Church, Botany Road

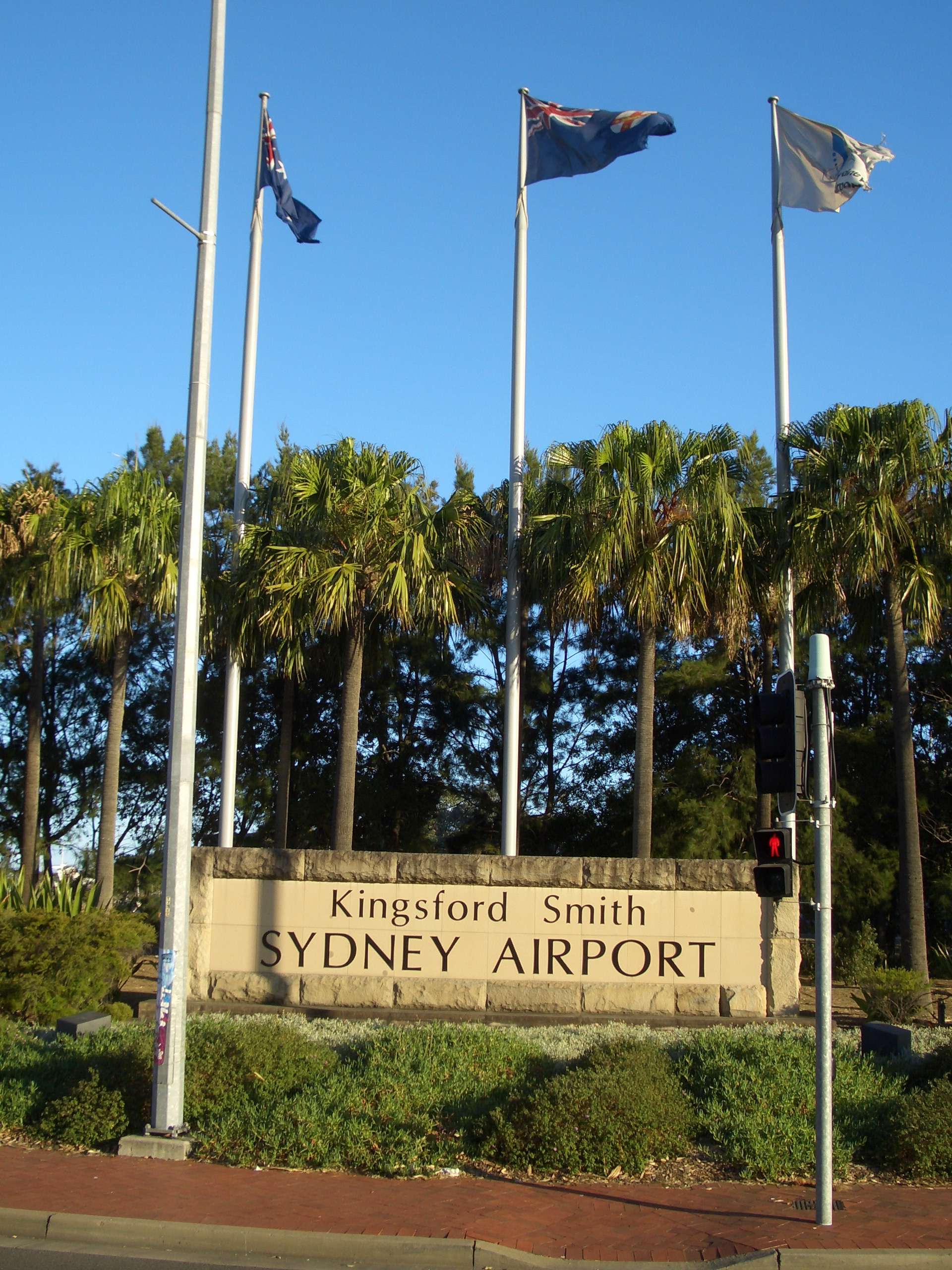
Entrance to Sydney Airport

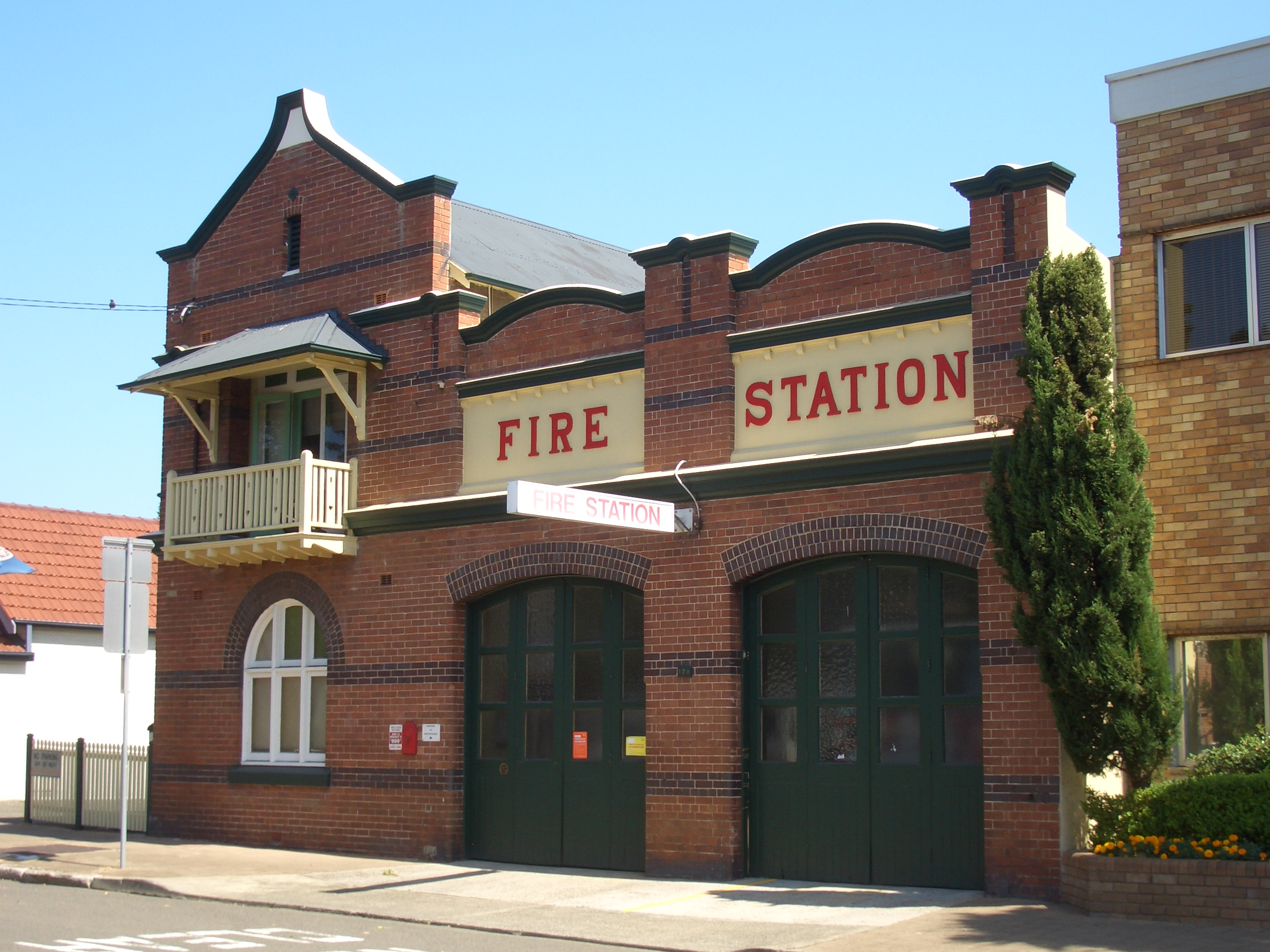
Mascot Fire Station, Coward Street

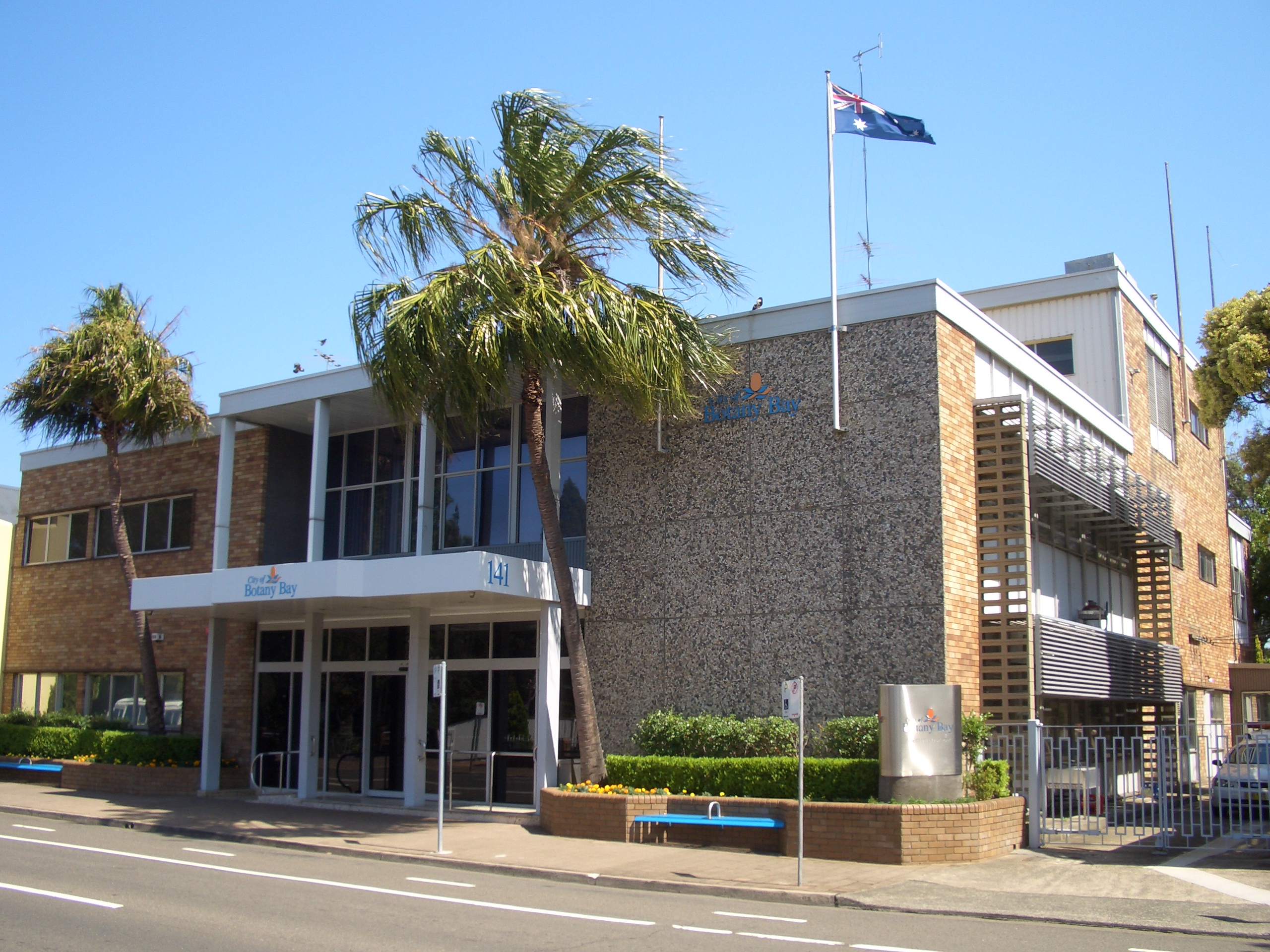
Council Chambers, Coward Street

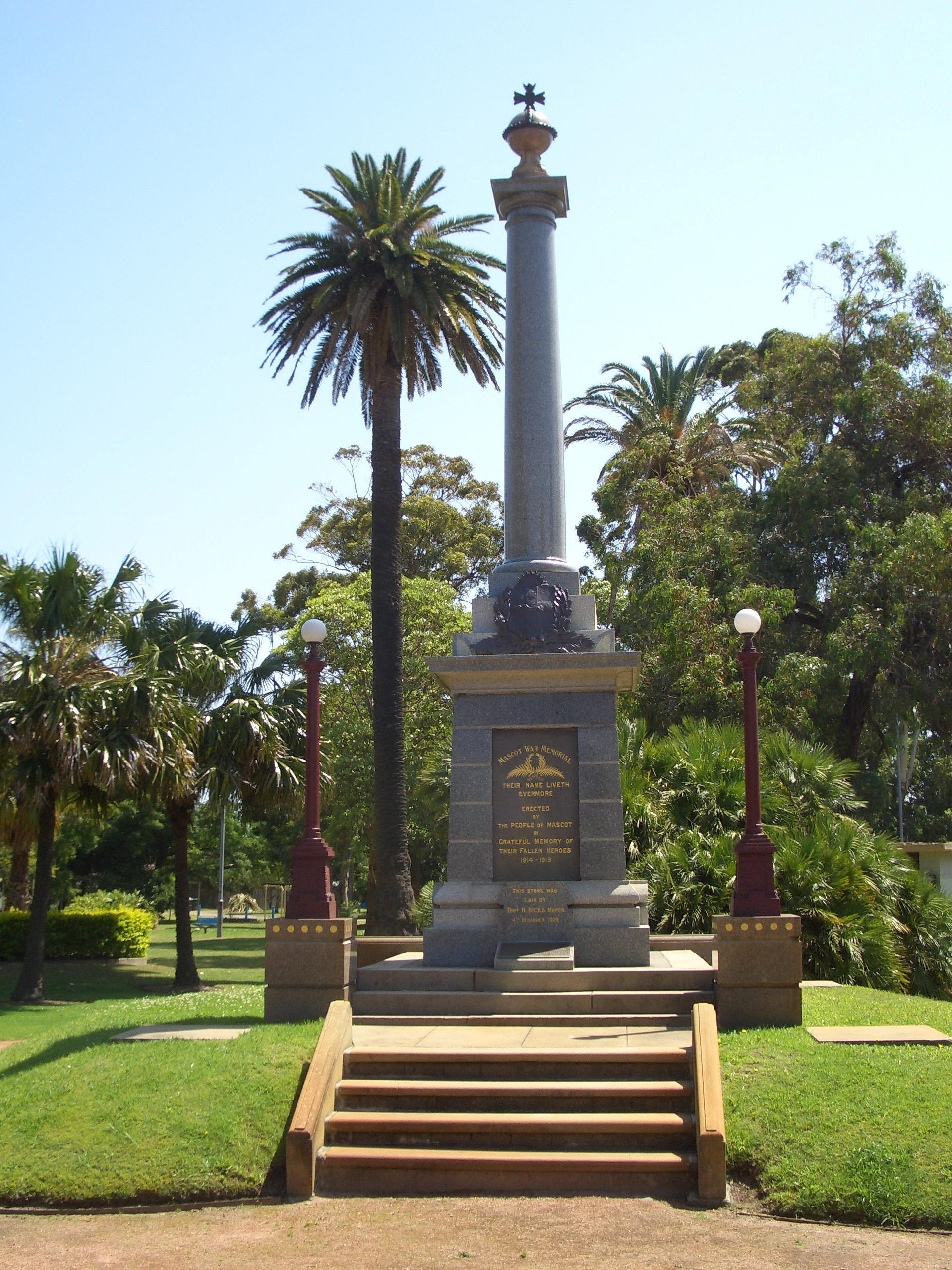
Mascot Memorial Park, Botany Road

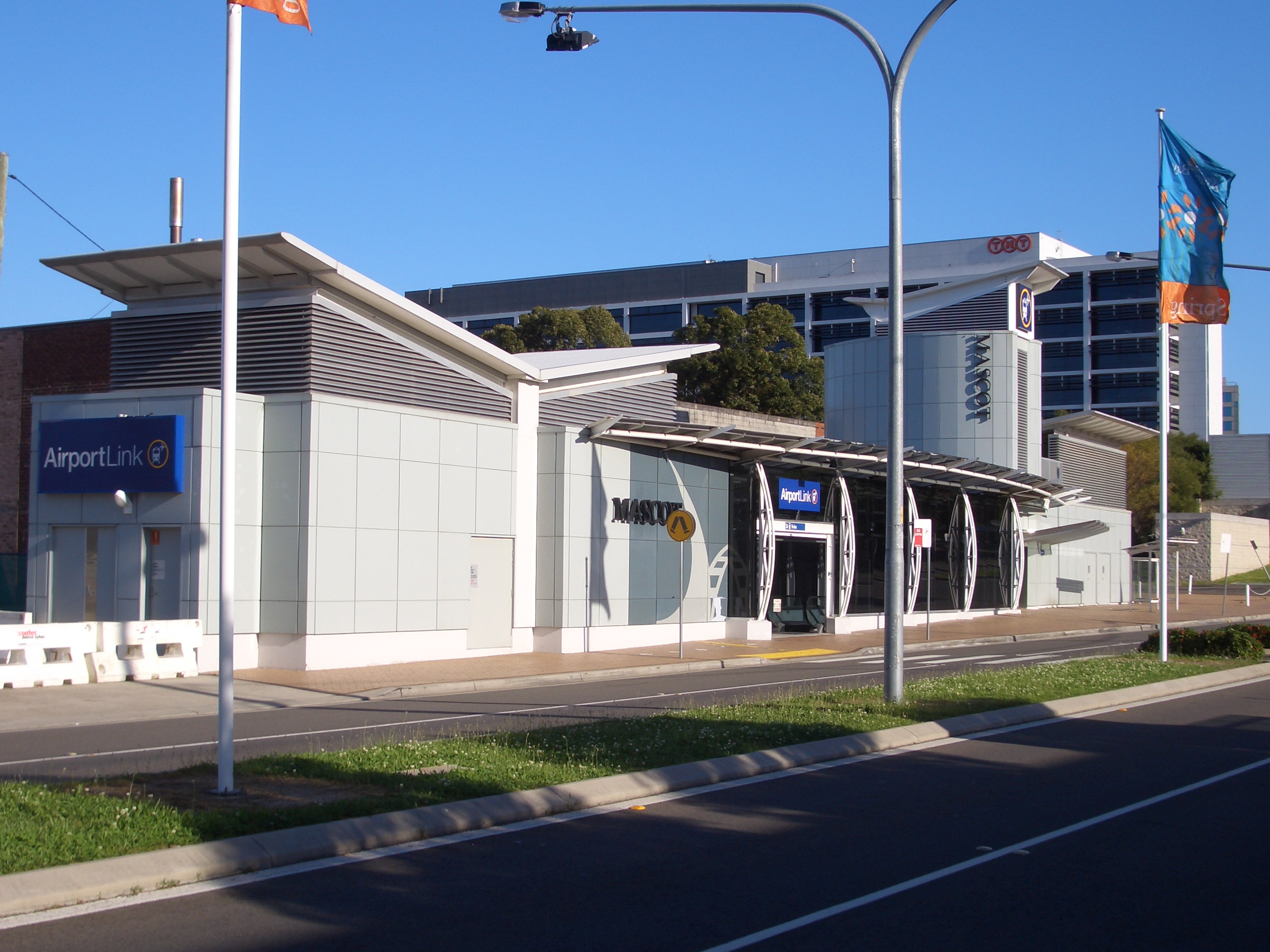
Mascot railway station

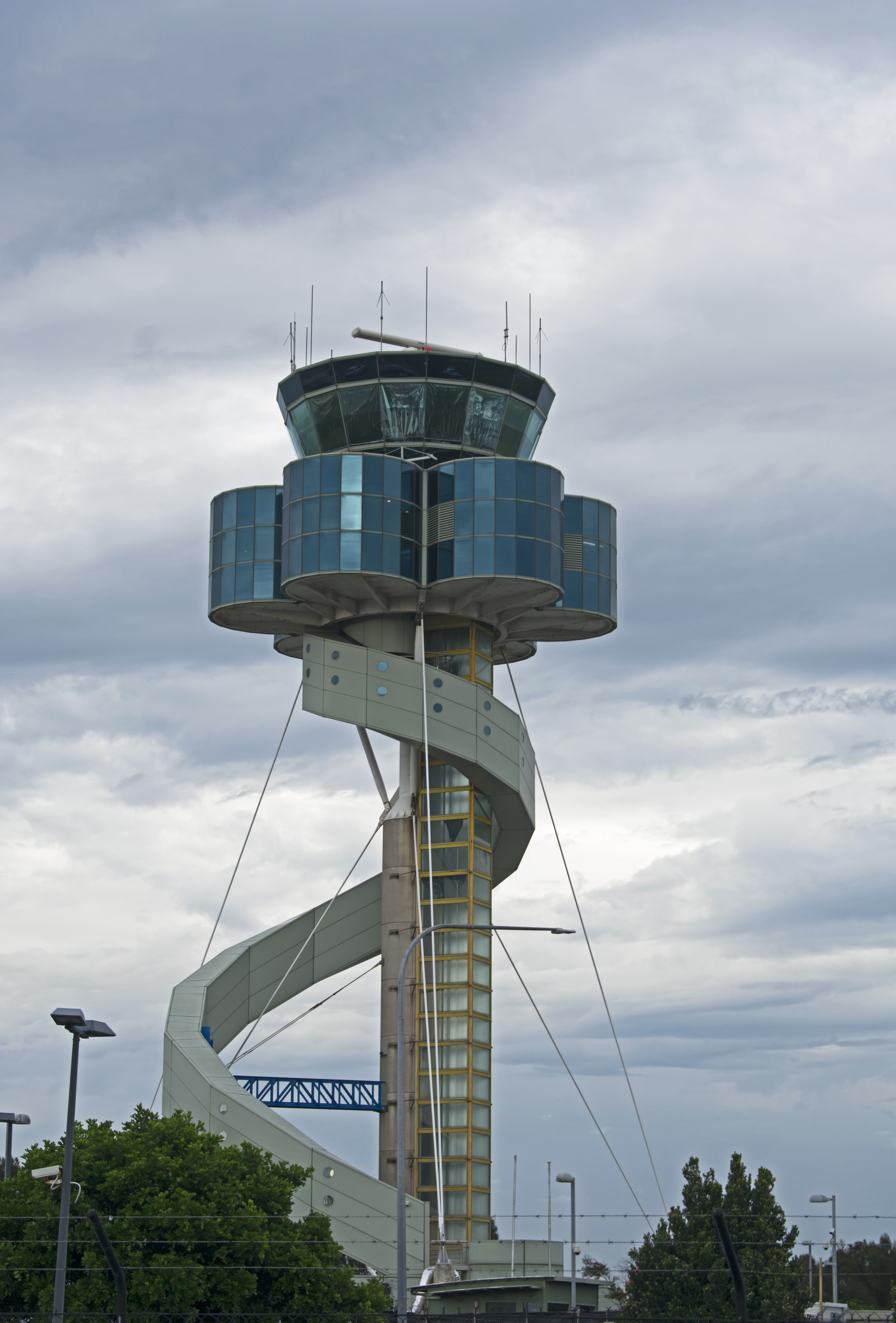
Sydney Airport control tower

== Climate ==
Mascot has a humid subtropical climate (Cfa) with warm summers and mild winters. The area receives 104 clear days and 129 cloudy days annually.

Climate data for Sydney Airport (Eastern Sydney)
Month	Jan	Feb	Mar	Apr	May	Jun	Jul	Aug	Sep	Oct	Nov	Dec	Year
Record high °C (°F)	46.4 (115.5)	42.9 (109.2)	41.2 (106.2)	35.7 (96.3)	29.1 (84.4)	25.6 (78.1)	26.7 (80.1)	30.9 (87.6)	35.9 (96.6)	39.1 (102.4)	43.4 (110.1)	43.2 (109.8)	46.4 (115.5)
Mean daily maximum °C (°F)	27.7 (81.9)	27.1 (80.8)	25.8 (78.4)	23.3 (73.9)	20.6 (69.1)	18.1 (64.6)	17.7 (63.9)	19.1 (66.4)	21.6 (70.9)	23.6 (74.5)	24.6 (76.3)	26.4 (79.5)	23.0 (73.4)
Daily mean °C (°F)	23.8 (74.8)	23.5 (74.3)	22.1 (71.8)	19.2 (66.6)	16.3 (61.3)	13.9 (57.0)	13.7 (56.7)	14.2 (57.6)	16.7 (62.1)	19.0 (66.2)	20.5 (68.9)	22.4 (72.3)	18.8 (65.8)
Mean daily minimum °C (°F)	20.0 (68.0)	20.0 (68.0)	18.5 (65.3)	15.2 (59.4)	12.1 (53.8)	9.8 (49.6)	8.5 (47.3)	9.3 (48.7)	11.9 (53.4)	14.4 (57.9)	16.5 (61.7)	18.4 (65.1)	14.5 (58.1)
Record low °C (°F)	13.0 (55.4)	12.0 (53.6)	8.8 (47.8)	7.1 (44.8)	3.8 (38.8)	2.2 (36.0)	0.8 (33.4)	3.2 (37.8)	5.1 (41.2)	6.0 (42.8)	7.6 (45.7)	11 (52)	0.8 (33.4)
Average rainfall mm (inches)	80.7 (3.18)	117.2 (4.61)	96.3 (3.79)	98.2 (3.87)	89.3 (3.52)	125.9 (4.96)	69.5 (2.74)	63.3 (2.49)	59.0 (2.32)	55.5 (2.19)	72.3 (2.85)	67.1 (2.64)	996.2 (39.22)
Average rainy days (≥ 1 mm)	7.8	8.6	9.4	8.2	7.6	8.9	7.0	5.4	6.3	7.4	8.6	7.9	93.1
Average afternoon relative humidity (%)	59	62	60	58	59	58	53	46	49	52	56	57	56
Mean monthly sunshine hours	235.6	202.4	213.9	207.0	195.3	177.0	204.6	244.9	237.0	244.9	228.0	244.9	2,635.5
Source 1: Bureau of Meteorology (records)
Source 2: Bureau of Meteorology (1991-2020 averages)
