= 2023 NSWRL Presidents Cup =

The 2023 New South Wales Rugby League Presidents Cup was a competition to determine the best semi-professional Rugby League team in New South Wales. It was the fourth season of the competition. The winners of each conference will play a 2-week knockout series to determine the Presidents Cup winners.

== Presidents Cup ==
Semi-Finals
N	Maitland	0
S	Thirroul	0
C	St Marys	0
W	Dubbo	0

Grand Final
N	Maitland	32
C	St Marys	10

Home	Score	Away	Match Information
Home	Score	Away	Date and Time	Venue	Referee
Semi-Finals
Maitland Pickers	0* – 0	Thirroul Butchers	Saturday, 16 September, 2:00pm	Maitland Sportsground	N/A
St Marys Saints	0* – 0	Dubbo CYMS	Saturday, 16 September, 2:00pm	St Marys Leagues Stadium	N/A
Grand Final
St Marys Saints	10 – 32	Maitland Pickers	Sunday, 24 September, 11:00am	CommBank Stadium	TBA

== Central Conference (Ron Massey Cup) ==
The Ron Massey Cup will feature 9 teams in 2023, the same number as 2022. All 8 of the 9 teams are based in Sydney in 2022, with the other team based in Fiji.

2023 Ron Massey Cup
- Duration: 18 March – 3 September 2023
- Teams: 9
- Broadcast partners: NSWRL TV

=== Teams ===
Colours	Club	Presidents Cup Season	Home ground(s)	Head coach
	Canterbury-Bankstown Bulldogs	1st season	Hammondville Oval	TBA
	Glebe Dirty Reds	3rd season	Wentworth Park	TBA
	Hills District Bulls	4th season	Crestwood Reserve	TBA
	Kaiviti Silktails	3rd season	Churchill Park	TBA
	Mount Pritchard Mounties	3rd season	Aubrey Keech Reserve	TBA
	Penrith Brothers	1st season	Parker Street Reserve	TBA
	Ryde-Eastwood Hawks	3rd season	TG Milner Field	TBA
	St Marys Saints	3rd season	St Marys Leagues Stadium	TBA
	Wentworthville Magpies	4th season	Ringrose Park	TBA

=== Ladder ===
Pos	Team	Pld	W	D	L	B	PF	PA	PD	Pts
1	St Marys Saints	16	16	0	0	2	490	220	+270	36
2	Glebe Dirty Reds	16	10	0	6	2	388	392	–4	24
3	Wentworthville Magpies	16	9	1	6	2	347	320	+27	23
4	Ryde-Eastwood Hawks	16	8	0	8	2	344	289	+55	20
5	Hills District Bulls	16	8	0	8	2	436	384	+52	20
6	Kaiviti Silktails	16	7	0	9	2	351	377	–26	18
7	Penrith Brothers	16	5	1	10	2	335	427	–92	15
8	Mount Pritchard Mounties	16	4	0	12	2	342	374	–32	12
9	Canterbury-Bankstown Bulldogs	16	4	0	12	2	310	560	–250	12

Updated to match(es) played on 30 July 2023. Source:
Rules for classification: 1) points; 2) point difference; 3) points scored

==== Ladder progression ====
- Numbers highlighted in green indicate that the team finished the round inside the top 5.
- Numbers highlighted in blue indicates the team finished first on the ladder in that round.
- Numbers highlighted in red indicates the team finished last place on the ladder in that round.
- Underlined numbers indicate that the team had a bye during that round.

Pos	Team	1	2	3	4	5	6	7	8	9	10	11	12	13	14	15	16	17	18
1	St Marys Saints	2	4	6	8	10	12	14	16	18	20	22	24	26	28	30	32	34	36
2	Glebe Dirty Reds	2	4	6	8	10	12	12	12	14	16	18	18	18	18	20	22	22	24
3	Wentworthville Magpies	0	2	2	4	6	8	8	10	12	12	14	16	17	19	21	21	23	23
4	Ryde-Eastwood Hawks	2	4	6	6	6	6	8	10	12	14	14	16	18	18	18	18	18	20
5	Hills District Bulls	2	2	4	6	6	8	10	10	10	12	12	12	14	16	16	16	18	20
6	Kaiviti Silktails	0	2	2	2	4	6	6	6	6	8	10	12	14	14	16	18	18	18
7	Penrith Brothers	2	2	2	2	2	2	4	4	6	6	8	8	9	11	11	13	15	15
8	Mount Pritchard Mounties	0	0	0	2	4	4	6	8	8	8	8	8	8	8	10	10	12	12
9	Canterbury-Bankstown Bulldogs	0	0	2	2	2	2	2	4	4	4	4	6	6	8	8	10	10	12

=== Season Results ===
==== Round 1 ====
Home	Score	Away	Match Information
Home	Score	Away	Date and Time	Venue	Referee
Canterbury-Bankstown Bulldogs	10 – 40	Ryde-Eastwood Hawks	Saturday, 18 March, 6:30pm	Hammondville Oval	Mitch Currie
Penrith Brothers	17 – 16	Kaiviti Silktails	Sunday, 19 March, 3:00pm	New Era Stadium	Cameron Turner
Wentworthville Magpies	18 – 26	Glebe Dirty Reds	Sunday, 19 March, 3:00pm	Ringrose Park	Martin Jones
St Marys Saints	36 – 14	Mount Pritchard Mounties	Sunday, 19 March, 3:00pm	St Marys Leagues Stadium	Karra-Lee Nolan
Hills District Bulls		BYE

==== Round 2 ====
Home	Score	Away	Match Information
Home	Score	Away	Date and Time	Venue	Referee
Kaiviti Silktails	44 – 10	Canterbury-Bankstown Bulldogs	Saturday, 25 March, 12:00pm	Churchill Park	Martin Jones
Ryde-Eastwood Hawks	24 – 8	Penrith Brothers	Saturday, 25 March, 1:00pm	Lidcombe Oval	Clayton Wills
Mount Pritchard Mounties	4 – 18	Wentworthville Magpies	Saturday, 25 March, 3:00pm	Aubrey Keech Reserve	Mitch Currie
St Marys Saints	32 – 12	Hills District Bulls	Saturday, 25 March, 3:00pm	St Marys Leagues Stadium	Cameron Turner
Glebe Dirty Reds		BYE

==== Round 3 ====
Home	Score	Away	Match Information
Home	Score	Away	Date and Time	Venue	Referee
Mount Pritchard Mounties	18 – 26	Ryde-Eastwood Hawks	Saturday, 1 April, 3:00pm	Aubrey Keech Reserve	Cameron Turner
Penrith Brothers	6 – 30	St Marys Saints	Sunday, 2 April, 3:00pm	St Marys Leagues Stadium	Martin Jones
Wentworthville Magpies	10 – 22	Hills District Bulls	Sunday, 2 April, 3:00pm	Kellyville Park	Clayton Wills
Glebe Dirty Reds	22 – 4	Kaiviti Silktails	Sunday, 2 April, 4:45pm	Waminda Oval	Mitch Currie
Canterbury-Bankstown Bulldogs		BYE

==== Round 4 ====
Home	Score	Away	Match Information
Home	Score	Away	Date and Time	Venue	Referee
Wentworthville Magpies	26 – 10	Penrith Brothers	Friday, 7 April, 4:00pm	Ringrose Park	Mitch Currie
Ryde-Eastwood Hawks	18 – 22	Glebe Dirty Reds	Saturday, 8 April, 3:00pm	Lidcombe Oval	Cameron Turner
Mount Pritchard Mounties	44 – 18	Kaiviti Silktails	Saturday, 8 April, 5:00pm	Aubrey Keech Reserve	Tom Stindl
Hills District Bulls	48 – 10	Canterbury-Bankstown Bulldogs	Sunday, 9 April, 2:00pm	Kellyville Park	Nathan Loveday
St Marys Saints		BYE

==== Round 5 ====
Home	Score	Away	Match Information
Home	Score	Away	Date and Time	Venue	Referee
Kaiviti Silktails	36 – 24	Hills District Bulls	Saturday, 15 April, 12:00pm	Churchill Park	Nathan Loveday
St Marys Saints	16 – 10	Ryde-Eastwood Hawks	Saturday, 15 April, 3:00pm	St Marys Leagues Stadium	Martin Jones
Mount Pritchard Mounties	18 – 12	Penrith Brothers	Saturday, 15 April, 5:00pm	Aubrey Keech Reserve	Cameron Turner
Canterbury-Bankstown Bulldogs	12 – 52	Glebe Dirty Reds	Saturday, 15 April, 6:30pm	Hammondville Oval	Mitch Currie
Wentworthville Magpies		BYE

==== Round 6 ====
Home	Score	Away	Match Information
Home	Score	Away	Date and Time	Venue	Referee
Wentworthville Magpies	16 – 6	Ryde-Eastwood Hawks	Saturday, 22 April, 2:00pm	Ringrose Park	Nathan Loveday
St Marys Saints	34 – 20	Canterbury-Bankstown Bulldogs	Saturday, 22 April, 3:00pm	St Marys Leagues Stadium	Karra-Lee Nolan
Glebe Dirty Reds	30 – 22	Penrith Brothers	Sunday, 23 April, 11:45am	Wentworth Park	Martin Jones
Hills District Bulls	30 – 18	Mount Pritchard Mounties	Sunday, 23 April, 3:00pm	Crestwood Reserve	Clayton Wills
Kaiviti Silktails		BYE

==== Round 7 ====
Home	Score	Away	Match Information
Home	Score	Away	Date and Time	Venue	Referee
Canterbury-Bankstown Bulldogs	18 – 32	Mount Pritchard Mounties	Friday, 28 April, 7:30pm	Belmore Sports Ground	Nathan Loveday
Hills District Bulls	42 – 12	Glebe Dirty Reds	Sunday, 30 April, 3:00pm	Crestwood Reserve	Mitch Currie
St Marys Saints	20 – 14	Wentworthville Magpies	Sunday, 30 April, 3:00pm	St Marys Leagues Stadium	Cameron Turner
Ryde-Eastwood Hawks	40 – 14	Kaiviti Silktails	Sunday, 30 April, 3:00pm	TG Milner Field	Karra-Lee Nolan
Penrith Brothers		BYE

==== Round 8 ====
Home	Score	Away	Match Information
Home	Score	Away	Date and Time	Venue	Referee
St Marys Saints	36 – 14	Glebe Dirty Reds	Saturday, 13 May, 3:00pm	St Marys Leagues Stadium	Mitch Currie
Canterbury-Bankstown Bulldogs	36 – 12	Penrith Brothers	Saturday, 13 May, 6:30pm	Hammondville Oval	Nathan Loveday
Wentworthville Magpies	28 – 20	Kaiviti Silktails	Saturday, 13 May, 6:00pm	Ringrose Park	Martin Jones
Hills District Bulls	6 – 26	Ryde-Eastwood Hawks	Sunday, 14 May, 3:00pm	Crestwood Reserve	Clayton Wills
Mount Pritchard Mounties		BYE

==== Round 9 ====
Home	Score	Away	Match Information
Home	Score	Away	Date and Time	Venue	Referee
Kaiviti Silktails	12 – 22	St Marys Saints	Saturday, 20 May, 12:00pm	Churchill Park	Cameron Turner
Mount Pritchard Mounties	20 – 34	Glebe Dirty Reds	Saturday, 20 May, 3:00pm	Aubrey Keech Reserve	Karra-Lee Nolan
Hills District Bulls	22 – 30	Penrith Brothers	Sunday, 21 May, 3:00pm	Crestwood Reserve	Martin Jones
Wentworthville Magpies	38 – 22	Canterbury-Bankstown Bulldogs	Sunday, 21 May, 3:00pm	Ringrose Park	Clayton Wills
Ryde-Eastwood Hawks		BYE

==== Round 10 ====
Home	Score	Away	Match Information
Home	Score	Away	Date and Time	Venue	Referee
Mount Pritchard Mounties	12 – 24	St Marys Saints	Saturday, 27 May, 3:00pm	Aubrey Keech Reserve	TBA
Kaiviti Silktails	23 – 10	Penrith Brothers	Saturday, 27 May, 8:00pm	Prince Charles Park	TBA
Glebe Dirty Reds	34 – 22	Wentworthville Magpies	Sunday, 28 May, 1:15pm	Wentworth Park	TBA
Ryde-Eastwood Hawks	40 – 20	Canterbury-Bankstown Bulldogs	Sunday, 28 May, 3:00pm	TG Milner Field	TBA
Hills District Bulls		BYE

==== Round 11 ====
Home	Score	Away	Match Information
Home	Score	Away	Date and Time	Venue	Referee
Kaiviti Silktails	34 – 12	Canterbury-Bankstown Bulldogs	Saturday, 3 June, 12:00pm	Churchill Park	TBA
Penrith Brothers	34 – 20	Ryde-Eastwood Hawks	Saturday, 3 June, 3:00pm	HE Laybutt Sporting Complex	TBA
Hills District Bulls	12 – 40	St Marys Saints	Sunday, 4 June, 3:00pm	Crestwood Reserve	TBA
Wentworthville Magpies	24 – 18	Mount Pritchard Mounties	Sunday, 4 June, 3:00pm	Ringrose Park	TBA
Glebe Dirty Reds		BYE

==== Round 12 ====
Home	Score	Away	Match Information
Home	Score	Away	Date and Time	Venue	Referee
Kaiviti Silktails	42 – 14	Glebe Dirty Reds	Saturday, 17 June, 12:00pm	Churchill Park	TBA
St Marys Saints	30 – 24	Penrith Brothers	Saturday, 17 June, 3:00pm	St Marys Leagues Stadium	TBA
Hills District Bulls	12 – 40	Wentworthville Magpies	Sunday, 18 June, 3:00pm	Crestwood Reserve	TBA
Ryde-Eastwood Hawks	26 – 16	Mount Pritchard Mounties	Sunday, 18 June, 3:00pm	TG Milner Field	TBA
Canterbury-Bankstown Bulldogs		BYE

==== Round 13 ====
Home	Score	Away	Match Information
Home	Score	Away	Date and Time	Venue	Referee
Kaiviti Silktails	22 – 20	Mount Pritchard Mounties	Saturday, 24 June, 12:00pm	Churchill Park	TBA
Canterbury-Bankstown Bulldogs	22 – 54	Hills District Bulls	Saturday, 24 June, 3:00pm	Hammondville Oval	TBA
Glebe Dirty Reds	0 – 22	Ryde-Eastwood Hawks	Sunday, 25 June, 11:45am	Wentworth Park	TBA
Wentworthville Magpies	30 – 30	Penrith Brothers	Sunday, 25 June, 3:00pm	Ringrose Park	TBA
St Marys Saints		BYE

==== Round 14 ====
Home	Score	Away	Match Information
Home	Score	Away	Date and Time	Venue	Referee
Glebe Dirty Reds	28 – 38	Canterbury-Bankstown Bulldogs	Sunday, 2 July, 2:00pm	Wentworth Park	TBA
Penrith Brothers	34 – 28	Mount Pritchard Mounties	Sunday, 2 July, 3:00pm	Parker Street Reserve	TBA
Hills District Bulls	38 – 6	Kaiviti Silktails	Sunday, 2 July, 3:00pm	Crestwood Reserve	TBA
Ryde-Eastwood Hawks	16 – 20	St Marys Saints	Sunday, 2 July, 3:00pm	TG Milner Field	TBA
Wentworthville Magpies		BYE

==== Round 15 ====
Home	Score	Away	Match Information
Home	Score	Away	Date and Time	Venue	Referee
Mount Pritchard Mounties	40 – 6	Hills District Bulls	Saturday, 8 July, 3:00pm	Aubrey Keech Reserve	TBA
Ryde-Eastwood Hawks	12 – 17	Wentworthville Magpies	Saturday, 8 July, 3:00pm	TG Milner Field	TBA
Canterbury-Bankstown Bulldogs	8 – 18	St Marys Saints	Saturday, 8 July, 6:30pm	Hammondville Oval	TBA
Penrith Brothers	18 – 38	Glebe Dirty Reds	Sunday, 9 July, 3:00pm	Parker Street Reserve	TBA
Kaiviti Silktails		BYE

==== Round 16 ====
Home	Score	Away	Match Information
Home	Score	Away	Date and Time	Venue	Referee
Kaiviti Silktails	28 – 10	Ryde-Eastwood Hawks	Saturday, 15 July, 12:00pm	Churchill Park	TBA
Mount Pritchard Mounties	26 – 28	Canterbury-Bankstown Bulldogs	Saturday, 15 July, 3:00pm	Aubrey Keech Reserve	TBA
Wentworthville Magpies	16 – 44	St Marys Saints	Saturday, 15 July, 3:00pm	Ringrose Park	TBA
Glebe Dirty Reds	32 – 26	Hills District Bulls	Sunday, 16 July, 3:15pm	Wentworth Park	TBA
Penrith Brothers		BYE

==== Round 17 ====
Home	Score	Away	Match Information
Home	Score	Away	Date and Time	Venue	Referee
Kaiviti Silktails	14 – 16	Wentworthville Magpies	Saturday, 22 July, 12:00pm	Churchill Park	TBA
Penrith Brothers	46 – 18	Canterbury-Bankstown Bulldogs	Saturday, 22 July, 3:00pm	Parker Street Reserve	TBA
Glebe Dirty Reds	12 – 38	St Marys Saints	Sunday, 23 July, 12:30pm	St Marys Leagues Stadium	TBA
Ryde-Eastwood Hawks	8 – 44	Hills District Bulls	Sunday, 23 July, 3:00pm	TG Milner Field	TBA
Mount Pritchard Mounties		BYE

==== Round 18 ====
Home	Score	Away	Match Information
Home	Score	Away	Date and Time	Venue	Referee
Canterbury-Bankstown Bulldogs	26 – 14	Wentworthville Magpies	Saturday, 29 July, 6:30pm	Hammondville Oval	TBA
Glebe Dirty Reds	18 – 14	Mount Pritchard Mounties	Sunday, 30 July, 2:00pm	Wentworth Park	TBA
Penrith Brothers	22 – 38	Hills District Bulls	Sunday, 30 July, 3:00pm	Parker Street Reserve	TBA
St Marys Saints	50 – 18	Kaiviti Silktails	Sunday, 30 July, 3:00pm	St Marys Leagues Stadium	TBA
Ryde-Eastwood Hawks		BYE

=== Finals Series ===
Qualifying Final
2	Glebe	6
3	Wentworthville	32
4	Ryde-Eastwood	26
5	Hills District	18

Major Semi-Final
1	St Marys	12
3	Wentworthville	18
Minor Semi-Final
2	Glebe	28
4	Ryde-Eastwood	10

Preliminary Final
1	St Marys	52
2	Glebe	0

Grand Final
3	Wentworthville	12
1	St Marys	40

Home	Score	Away	Match Information
Home	Score	Away	Date and Time	Venue	Referee
Qualifying & Elimination Finals
Ryde-Eastwood Hawks	26 – 18	Hills District Bulls	Sunday, 13 August, 1:00pm	St Marys Leagues Stadium	Clayton Wills
Glebe Dirty Reds	6 – 32	Wentworthville Magpies	Sunday, 13 August, 5:00pm	St Marys Leagues Stadium	Daniel Luttringer
Minor & Major Semi-Finals
St Marys Saints	12 – 18	Wentworthville Magpies	Saturday, 19 August, 1:00pm	St Marys Leagues Stadium	Daniel Luttringer
Glebe Dirty Reds	28 – 10	Ryde-Eastwood Hawks	Saturday, 19 August, 5:00pm	St Marys Leagues Stadium	Clayton Wills
Preliminary Final
St Marys Saints	52 – 0	Glebe Dirty Reds	Saturday, 26 August, 3:00pm	HE Laybutt Sporting Complex	Clayton Wills
Grand Final
Wentworthville Magpies	12 – 40	St Marys Saints	Sunday, 3 September, 3:00pm	Netstrada Jubilee Stadium	Clayton Wills

== Northern Conference (Denton Engineering Cup) ==
The Denton Engineering Cup will feature 11 teams in 2023, 1 up from 2022.

2023 Denton Engineering Cup
- Duration: 25 March – 3 September 2023
- Teams: 11
- Broadcast partners: Bar TV Sports

=== Teams ===
Colours	Club	Presidents Cup Season	Home ground(s)	Head coach
	Central Newcastle Butcher Boys	3rd season	St John Oval	Phil Williams
	Cessnock Goannas	3rd season	Baddeley Park	Harry Siejka
	Kurri Kurri Bulldogs	3rd season	Kurri Kurri Sports Ground	Dan Linnane
	Lakes United Seagulls	3rd season	Cahill Oval	Ian Bourke
	Macquarie Scorpions	3rd season	Lyall Peacock Field	Matt Roach
	Maitland Pickers	4th season	Maitland Sportsground	Matt Lantry
	Northern Hawks	1st season	Tomaree Sports Ground	Brad Tighe
	South Newcastle Lions	3rd season	Townson Oval	Andrew Ryan
	The Entrance Tigers	3rd season	EDSACC Oval	Jamie Forbes
	Western Suburbs Rosellas	3rd season	Harker Oval	Rick Stone
	Wyong Roos	3rd season	Morry Breen Oval	Mitch Williams

=== Team of the Year ===
On Saturday 30 September 2023, the Newcastle Rugby League announced the official Team of the Year and Joint-Player of the Year.

- Fullback – Luke Sharpe (Wyong Roos)
- Winger – Honeti Tuha (Cessnock Goannas)
- Centre – Brayden Musgrove (Cessnock Goannas)
- Five-Eighth – Ryan Glanville (South Newcastle Lions)
- Halfback – Brock Lamb (Maitland Pickers)
- Prop – Nathan Kegg-King (Wyong Roos)
- Hooker – Luke Huth (Cessnock Goannas)
- Second Row – Nick Glohe (Lakes United)
- Lock – Ben Stone (Western Suburbs Rosellas)
- Coach – Matt Lantry (Maitland Pickers)
- Player of the Year – Brock Lamb (Maitland Pickers) & Luke Huth (Cessnock Goannas)

Other category winners were also announced:

- Rookie of the Year - Hayden Ritchie (The Entrance Tigers)
- Coach of the Year - Matt Lantry (Maitland Pickers)
- Hit of the Year - Josh Toole (Northern Hawks)
- Try of the Year - Hayden Loughrey (Western Suburbs Rosellas)
- Representative Player of the Year - Chad O’Donnell (Maitland Pickers)
- Leading pointscorer - Brock Lamb (Maitland Pickers)
- Leading tryscorer - Honeti Tuha (Cessnock Goannas)

LeagueCastle provides official statistics for the Newcastle Rugby League competition.

- Most try assists - Luke Sharpe 21 (Wyong Roos)
- Most line-break assists - Sam Clune 22 (Cessnock Goannas)
- Most tackles - Ben Stone 678 (Western Suburbs Rosellas)
- Most line breaks - Honeti Tuha 20 (Cessnock Goannas)
- Most metres run - Brayden Musgrove 2,626 (Cessnock Goannas)
- Most tackle breaks - Brayden Musgrove 97 (Cessnock Goannas)

Running a Dally-M Style voting competition based on best statistical performances (3/2/1 point votes per game), Leaguecastle announced their 2023 Newcastle Rugby League Team of the Year 1 and 2 as follows:

==== LeagueCastle Team of the Year ====
- Player/Stat Man of the Year – Mitch Black (South Newcastle Lions)
- Fullback – Luke Sharpe (Wyong Roos)
- Wingers – Honeti Tuha (Cessnock Goannas) & Matt Soper-Lawler (Maitland Pickers)
- Centres – Brayden Musgrove (Cessnock Goannas) & Lathan Hutchinson-Walters (Wyong Roos)
- Five-Eighth – Bayden Searle (Macquarie Scorpions)
- Halfback – Brock Lamb (Maitland Pickers)
- Props – Nick Glohe (Lakes United) & Jayden Butterfield (Maitland Pickers)
- Hooker – Mitch Black (South Newcastle Lions)
- Second Rows – Harry Croker (South Newcastle Lions) & Ryan Glanville (South Newcastle Lions)
- Lock – Luke Huth (Cessnock Goannas)
- Coach (most players to register at least 1 vote) – Jamy Forbes (Entrance Tigers)
- Bench - Sam Clune (Cessnock Goannas), Alex Langbridge (Maitland Pickers), Mitch Williams (Wyong Roos), TJ Mclean (Entrance Tigers), Connor Kirkwood (Macquarie Scorpions)

==== LeagueCastle Team of the Year 2 ====
- Fullback – Harry O'Brien (Cessnock Goannas)
- Wingers – Will Niewenhuise (Maitland Pickers) & Kodi Crowther (Macquarie Scorpions)
- Centres – Kyle Mclean (Entrance Tigers) & Steve Widders (Western Suburbs Rosellas)
- Five-Eighth – Chad O'Donnell (Maitland Pickers)
- Halfback – Luke Walsh (Western Suburbs Rosellas)
- Props – Jake Goodwin (Western Suburbs Rosellas) & Nathan Kegg-King (Wyong Roos)
- Hooker – Dylan Phythian (Lakes United)
- Second Rows – Jake Woods (Entrance Tigers) & Will Mehan (Western Suburbs Rosellas)
- Lock – Ben Stone (Western Suburbs Rosellas)
- Bench - Cam Anderson (Central Newcastle), Grant Nelson (Entrance Tigers), Mao Uta (Entrance Tigers), Matt Cooper (Macquarie Scorpions), Timanu Alexander (Northern Hawks).

=== Ladder ===
Pos	Team	Pld	W	D	L	B	PF	PA	PD	Pts
1	Maitland Pickers	16	15	0	1	2	506	197	+309	34
2	South Newcastle Lions	16	12	0	4	2	476	294	+182	28
3	Cessnock Goannas	16	11	1	4	2	484	316	+168	27
4	Wyong Roos	16	11	0	5	2	377	292	+85	26
5	The Entrance Tigers	16	10	0	6	2	379	262	+117	24
6	Western Suburbs Rosellas	16	8	1	7	2	343	281	+62	21
7	Macquarie Scorpions	16	6	0	10	2	367	362	+5	16
8	Lakes United Seagulls	16	6	0	10	2	395	415	–20	16
9	Central Newcastle Butcher Boys	16	5	2	9	2	299	441	–142	16
10	Northern Hawks	16	2	0	14	2	238	486	–248	8
11	Kurri Kurri Bulldogs	16	0	0	16	2	194	712	–518	4

Updated to match(es) played on 6 August 2023. Source:
Rules for classification: 1) points; 2) point difference; 3) points scored

==== Ladder progression ====
- Numbers highlighted in green indicate that the team finished the round inside the top 5.
- Numbers highlighted in blue indicates the team finished first on the ladder in that round.
- Numbers highlighted in red indicates the team finished last place on the ladder in that round.
- Underlined numbers indicate that the team had a bye during that round.

Pos	Team	1	2	3	4	5	6	7	8	9	10	11	12	13	14	15	16	17	18
1	Maitland Pickers	2	4	6	8	10	10	12	14	16	18	20	22	24	26	28	30	32	34
2	South Newcastle Lions	0	2	2	2	4	6	8	10	12	14	16	18	20	22	24	26	26	28
3	Cessnock Goannas	2	4	6	8	10	12	14	16	16	16	17	19	19	21	21	23	25	27
4	Wyong Roos	2	4	6	8	10	10	12	12	14	16	16	18	20	22	24	24	24	26
5	The Entrance Tigers	0	0	2	4	6	8	10	12	12	12	14	16	16	18	20	22	24	24
6	Western Suburbs Rosellas	2	4	4	4	6	6	6	6	7	9	11	11	13	15	15	17	19	21
7	Macquarie Scorpions	0	2	4	6	6	8	8	10	12	12	12	12	12	12	14	14	16	16
8	Lakes United Seagulls	2	2	2	4	4	6	6	6	6	8	10	10	10	10	12	14	14	16
9	Central Newcastle Butcher Boys	2	2	4	4	4	4	6	6	7	9	10	12	14	14	14	14	16	16
10	Northern Hawks	0	0	0	0	0	2	2	4	6	6	6	6	8	8	8	8	8	8
11	Kurri Kurri Bulldogs	0	0	0	0	0	0	2	2	2	2	2	2	2	2	4	4	4	4

=== Season Results ===
==== Round 1 ====
Home	Score	Away	Match Information
Home	Score	Away	Date and Time	Venue	Referee	LeagueCastle's Man of the Match
Wyong Roos	26 – 14	The Entrance Tigers	Saturday, 25 March, 3:00pm	Morry Breen Oval	Rob Bowen	Blake Andrews
Cessnock Goannas	52 – 12	South Newcastle Lions	Sunday, 26 March, 3:00pm	Baddeley Park	Brett Eyb	Wyatt Shaw
Kurri Kurri Bulldogs	10 – 44	Maitland Pickers	Sunday, 26 March, 3:00pm	Kurri Kurri Sports Ground	Joey Butler	Chad O'Donnell
Central Newcastle Butcher Boys	22 – 20	Macquarie Scorpions	Sunday, 26 March, 3:00pm	St John Oval	Adam Sirriani	Cam Anderson
Northern Hawks	0 – 8	Western Suburbs Rosellas	Sunday, 26 March, 3:00pm	Tomaree Sports Ground	Kurt Grogan	Pat Achurch
Lakes United Seagulls		BYE

==== Round 2 ====
Home	Score	Away	Match Information
Home	Score	Away	Date and Time	Venue	Referee	LeagueCastle's Man of the Match
South Newcastle Lions	40 – 22	Central Newcastle Butcher Boys	Saturday, 1 April, 2:00pm	Townson Oval	Joey Butler	Mitch Black
Wyong Roos	26 – 4	Kurri Kurri Bulldogs	Saturday, 1 April, 3:00pm	Bill Hicks Oval	Tate Hoobin	Kye Hopwood
The Entrance Tigers	8 – 16	Macquarie Scorpions	Saturday, 1 April, 3:00pm	EDSACC Oval	Charlie Suters	Joseph Besgrove
Maitland Pickers	38 – 24	Lakes United Seagulls	Saturday, 1 April, 3:15pm	Maitland Sportsground	Tom Taylor	Alex Langbridge
Northern Hawks	22 – 34	Cessnock Goannas	Sunday, 2 April, 3:00pm	Tomaree Sports Ground	Rob Bowen	Honeti Tuha
Western Suburbs Rosellas		BYE

==== Round 3 ====
Home	Score	Away	Match Information
Home	Score	Away	Date and Time	Venue	Referee	LeagueCastle's Man of the Match
Western Suburbs Rosellas	10 – 20	Wyong Roos	Thursday, 6 April, 7:00pm	Harker Oval	Tom Taylor	Mitch Williams
Cessnock Goannas	42 – 16	Kurri Kurri Bulldogs	Thursday, 6 April, 8:00pm	Baddeley Park	Joey Butler	Honeti Tuha
Northern Hawks	8 – 26	Macquarie Scorpions	Thursday, 6 April, 8:00pm	Tomaree Sports Ground	Brayden Hunt	Bayden Searle
The Entrance Tigers	34 – 16	Lakes United Seagulls	Friday, 7 April, 3:00pm	EDSACC Oval	Kurt Grogan	Mao Uta
Maitland Pickers	20 – 12	South Newcastle Lions	Monday, 10 April, 2:00pm	Maitland Sportsground	Louis Matheson	Mitch Black
Central Newcastle Butcher Boys		BYE

==== Round 4 ====
Home	Score	Away	Match Information
Home	Score	Away	Date and Time	Venue	Referee	LeagueCastle's Man of the Match
Lakes United Seagulls	24 – 10	Northern Hawks	Saturday, 15 April, 3:00pm	Cahill Oval	Graham Stair	Dane Brouwer
Western Suburbs Rosellas	20 – 34	Cessnock Goannas	Saturday, 15 April, 3:00pm	Harker Oval	John Taylor	Reed Hugo
Macquarie Scorpions	62 – 6	Kurri Kurri Bulldogs	Saturday, 15 April, 3:00pm	Lyall Peacock Field	Nathan Hillier	Jordan Noble
Wyong Roos	36 – 18	Central Newcastle Butcher Boys	Saturday, 15 April, 3:00pm	Morry Breen Oval	Rob Bowen	Levi Kasun
The Entrance Tigers	32 – 22	South Newcastle Lions	Sunday, 16 April, 3:00pm	EDSACC Oval	Dillon Wells	Jacob Kernick
Maitland Pickers		BYE

==== Round 5 ====
Home	Score	Away	Match Information
Home	Score	Away	Date and Time	Venue	Referee	LeagueCastle's Man of the Match
Kurri Kurri Bulldogs	6 – 26	Western Suburbs Rosellas	Saturday, 22 April, 3:00pm	Kurri Kurri Sports Ground	Nathan Everleigh	Joel Munro
Macquarie Scorpions	30 – 40	Cessnock Goannas	Saturday, 22 April, 3:00pm	Lyall Peacock Field	Rob Bowen	Harry O'Brien
Central Newcastle Butcher Boys	6 – 44	Maitland Pickers	Sunday, 23 April, 3:00pm	St John Oval	Jack Bird	Will Niewenhuise
Northern Hawks	10 – 32	The Entrance Tigers	Sunday, 23 April, 3:00pm	Tomaree Sports Ground	Joey Butler	Jack Burraston
South Newcastle Lions	22 – 20	Lakes United Seagulls	Sunday, 23 April, 3:00pm	Townson Oval	Kurt Grogan	Ngangarra Barker
Wyong Roos		BYE

==== Round 6 ====
Home	Score	Away	Match Information
Home	Score	Away	Date and Time	Venue	Referee	LeagueCastle's Man of the Match
Cessnock Goannas	20 – 12	Maitland Pickers	Saturday, 29 April, 3:00pm	Baddeley Park	Joey Butler	Luke Huth
South Newcastle Lions	40 – 16	Kurri Kurri Bulldogs	Saturday, 29 April, 3:00pm	Townson Oval	Nathan Hillier	Harry Croker
Lakes United Seagulls	17 – 14	Western Suburbs Rosellas	Saturday, 29 April, 3:00pm	Cahill Oval	Rob Bowen	Nick Glohe
Macquarie Scorpions	19 – 18	Central Newcastle Butcher Boys	Saturday, 29 April, 3:00pm	Lyall Peacock Field	Kurt Grogan	Bayden Searle
The Entrance Tigers	20 – 8	Wyong Roos	Sunday, 30 April, 3:00pm	EDSACC Oval	Adam Sirriani	Will Pearsall
Northern Hawks		BYE

==== Round 7 ====
Home	Score	Away	Match Information
Home	Score	Away	Date and Time	Venue	Referee	LeagueCastle's Man of the Match
Maitland Pickers	23 – 16	Macquarie Scorpions	Saturday, 13 May, 3:00pm	Maitland Sportsground	Louis Matheson	Jayden Butterfield
Wyong Roos	22 – 16	Northern Hawks	Saturday, 13 May, 3:00pm	Morry Breen Oval	Rob Bowen	Isaac Blackhall
Western Suburbs Rosellas	12 – 18	South Newcastle Lions	Saturday, 13 May, 3:00pm	Harker Oval	Brayden Hunt	Logan Jones
Central Newcastle Butcher Boys	33 – 8	Lakes United Seagulls	Sunday, 14 May, 3:00pm	St John Oval	Tom Taylor	Nick Ritter
Cessnock Goannas	BYE	Kurri Kurri Bulldogs
The Entrance Tigers	BYE

==== Round 8 ====
Home	Score	Away	Match Information
Home	Score	Away	Date and Time	Venue	Referee	LeagueCastle's Man of the Match
Cessnock Goannas	34 – 14	Lakes United Seagulls	Saturday, 20 May, 3:00pm	Baddeley Park	Tom Taylor	Brayden Musgrove
Kurri Kurri Bulldogs	18 – 46	The Entrance Tigers	Saturday, 20 May, 3:00pm	Kurri Kurri Sports Ground	Brayden Hunt	Will Pearsall
Wyong Roos	20 – 44	South Newcastle Lions	Saturday, 20 May, 3:00pm	Morry Breen Oval	Rob Bowen	Mitch Black
Western Suburbs Rosellas	10 – 40	Maitland Pickers	Sunday, 21 May, 3:00pm	Harker Oval	Joey Butler	Matt Soper-Lawler
Central Newcastle Butcher Boys	6 – 38	Northern Hawks	Sunday, 21 May, 3:00pm	St John Oval	Charlie Suters	Manu Matoka
Macquarie Scorpions		BYE

==== Round 9 ====
Home	Score	Away	Match Information
Home	Score	Away	Date and Time	Venue	Referee	LeagueCastle's Man of the Match
Lakes United Seagulls	24 – 32	Macquarie Scorpions	Saturday, 27 May, 3:00pm	Cahill Oval	Brayden Hunt	Bayden Searle
Maitland Pickers	25 – 18	The Entrance Tigers	Saturday, 27 May, 3:00pm	Maitland Sportsground	Rob Bowen	Daniel Langbridge
Wyong Roos	26 – 18	Cessnock Goannas	Saturday, 27 May, 3:00pm	Morry Breen Oval	TBA	Luke Sharpe
Central Newcastle Butcher Boys	14 – 14	Western Suburbs Rosellas	Sunday, 28 May, 3:00pm	St John Oval	Kurt Grogan	Ben Stone
Northern Hawks	50 – 18	Kurri Kurri Bulldogs	Sunday, 28 May, 3:00pm	Tomaree Sports Ground	Tom Taylor	Timanu Alexander
South Newcastle Lions		BYE

==== Round 10 ====
Home	Score	Away	Match Information
Home	Score	Away	Date and Time	Venue	Referee	LeagueCastle's Man of the Match
Western Suburbs Rosellas	24 – 20	Northern Hawks	Saturday, 3 June, 3:00pm	Harker Oval	TBA	Will Mehan
Macquarie Scorpions	14 – 22	Wyong Roos	Saturday, 3 June, 3:00pm	Lyall Peacock Field	TBA	Mitch Williams
Maitland Pickers	40 – 12	Kurri Kurri Bulldogs	Saturday, 3 June, 3:00pm	Maitland Sportsground	TBA	Matt Soper-Lawler
South Newcastle Lions	22 – 14	Cessnock Goannas	Sunday, 4 June, 2:00pm	Townson Oval	TBA	Ryan Glanville
The Entrance Tigers	4 – 8	Central Newcastle Butcher Boys	Sunday, 4 June, 3:00pm	EDSACC Oval	TBA	Tom Madden
Lakes United Seagulls		BYE

==== Round 11 ====
Home	Score	Away	Match Information
Home	Score	Away	Date and Time	Venue	Referee	LeagueCastle's Man of the Match
Cessnock Goannas	26 – 26	Central Newcastle Butcher Boys	Saturday, 10 June, 3:00pm	Baddeley Park	Joey Butler	Lachlan O'Brien
Kurri Kurri Bulldogs	6 – 32	Lakes United Seagulls	Saturday, 10 June, 3:00pm	Kurri Kurri Sports Ground	Tom Taylor	Nick Glohe
Macquarie Scorpions	4 – 20	The Entrance Tigers	Saturday, 10 June, 3:00pm	Lyall Peacock Field	Rob Bowen	Jake Woods
Maitland Pickers	16 – 0	Wyong Roos	Saturday, 10 June, 3:00pm	Maitland Sportsground	Louis Matheson	Jayden Butterfield
Northern Hawks	10 – 34	South Newcastle Lions	Sunday, 11 June, 3:00pm	Tomaree Sports Ground	Kurt Grogan	Mitch Black
Western Suburbs Rosellas		BYE

==== Round 12 ====
Home	Score	Away	Match Information
Home	Score	Away	Date and Time	Venue	Referee	LeagueCastle's Man of the Match
Lakes United Seagulls	18 – 30	Wyong Roos	Saturday, 17 June, 3:00pm	Cahill Oval	TBA	Nathan Kegg-King
Kurri Kurri Bulldogs	32 – 34	Central Newcastle Butcher Boys	Saturday, 17 June, 3:00pm	Kurri Kurri Sports Ground	TBA	Josh Griffiths
The Entrance Tigers	30 – 25	Western Suburbs Rosellas	Sunday, 18 June, 2:00pm	EDSACC Oval	TBA	Grant Nelson
South Newcastle Lions	40 – 18	Macquarie Scorpions	Sunday, 18 June, 2:00pm	Townson Oval	TBA	Mitch Black
Northern Hawks	10 – 52	Maitland Pickers	Sunday, 18 June, 3:00pm	Tomaree Sports Ground	TBA	Brock Lamb
Cessnock Goannas		BYE

==== Round 13 ====
Home	Score	Away	Match Information
Home	Score	Away	Date and Time	Venue	Referee	LeagueCastle's Man of the Match
Kurri Kurri Bulldogs	6 – 64	South Newcastle Lions	Saturday, 24 June, 3:00pm	Kurri Kurri Sports Ground	TBA	Carlin Pettet
Maitland Pickers	24 – 16	Cessnock Goannas	Saturday, 24 June, 3:00pm	Maitland Sportsground	TBA	Jayden Butterfield
Wyong Roos	33 – 14	Macquarie Scorpions	Saturday, 24 June, 3:00pm	Morry Breen Oval	TBA	Luke Sharpe
Western Suburbs Rosellas	42 – 4	Lakes United Seagulls	Sunday, 25 June, 3:00pm	Harker Oval	TBA	Will Mehan
Central Newcastle Butcher Boys	24 – 18	The Entrance Tigers	Sunday, 25 June, 3:00pm	St John Oval	TBA	Dom Murphy
Northern Hawks		BYE

==== Round 14 ====
Home	Score	Away	Match Information
Home	Score	Away	Date and Time	Venue	Referee	LeagueCastle's Man of the Match
Cessnock Goannas	48 – 12	Northern Hawks	Saturday, 1 July, 3:00pm	Baddeley Park	TBA	Tony Pellow
Lakes United Seagulls	22 – 48	Maitland Pickers	Saturday, 1 July, 3:00pm	Cahill Oval	TBA	Brock Lamb
Macquarie Scorpions	6 – 24	Western Suburbs Rosellas	Saturday, 1 July, 3:00pm	Lyall Peacock Field	TBA	Steve Widders
Kurri Kurri Bulldogs	6 – 64	Wyong Roos	Saturday, 1 July, 3:00pm	Kurri Kurri Sports Ground	TBA	Lathan Hutchinson-Walters
Central Newcastle Butcher Boys	10 – 32	South Newcastle Lions	Sunday, 2 July, 3:00pm	St John Oval	TBA	Mitch Black
The Entrance Tigers		BYE

==== Round 15 ====
Home	Score	Away	Match Information
Home	Score	Away	Date and Time	Venue	Referee	LeagueCastle's Man of the Match
Cessnock Goannas	14 – 30	The Entrance Tigers	Saturday, 8 July, 3:00pm	Baddeley Park	TBA	TJ Mclean
Lakes United Seagulls	54 – 10	Central Newcastle Butcher Boys	Saturday, 8 July, 3:00pm	Cahill Oval	TBA	Dylan Phythian
South Newcastle Lions	28 – 12	Western Suburbs Rosellas	Saturday, 8 July, 3:00pm	Townson Oval	TBA	Ryan Glanville
Northern Hawks	16 – 28	Wyong Roos	Sunday, 9 July, 3:00pm	Tomaree Sports Ground	TBA	Luke Sharpe
Kurri Kurri Bulldogs	BYE	Macquarie Scorpions
Maitland Pickers	BYE

==== Round 16 ====
Home	Score	Away	Match Information
Home	Score	Away	Date and Time	Venue	Referee	LeagueCastle's Man of the Match
Western Suburbs Rosellas	28 – 26	Central Newcastle Butcher Boys	Saturday, 22 July, 2:00pm	Harker Oval	TBA	Luke Walsh
Cessnock Goannas	24 – 16	Wyong Roos	Saturday, 22 July, 3:00pm	Baddeley Park	TBA	Brayden Musgrove
Maitland Pickers	44 – 4	Northern Hawks	Saturday, 22 July, 3:00pm	Maitland Sportsground	TBA	Brock Lamb
Macquarie Scorpions	22 – 34	Lakes United Seagulls	Sunday, 23 July, 2:00pm	Lyall Peacock Field	TBA	Jesse Pascoe
The Entrance Tigers	38 – 14	Kurri Kurri Bulldogs	Sunday, 23 July, 3:00pm	EDSACC Oval	TBA	TJ Mclean
South Newcastle Lions		BYE

==== Round 17 ====
Home	Score	Away	Match Information
Home	Score	Away	Date and Time	Venue	Referee	LeagueCastle's Man of the Match
Kurri Kurri Bulldogs	12 – 40	Cessnock Goannas	Saturday, 29 July, 3:00pm	Kurri Kurri Sports Ground	TBA	Brayden Musgrove
Macquarie Scorpions	50 – 6	Northern Hawks	Saturday, 29 July, 3:00pm	Lyall Peacock Field	TBA	Connor Kirkwood
Wyong Roos	0 – 40	Western Suburbs Rosellas	Saturday, 29 July, 3:00pm	Morry Breen Oval	TBA	Jake Goodwin
South Newcastle Lions	10 – 24	Maitland Pickers	Saturday, 29 July, 3:00pm	Townson Oval	TBA	Jack Welsh
Lakes United Seagulls	20 – 28	The Entrance Tigers	Sunday, 30 July, 3:00pm	Cahill Oval	TBA	Kyle Mclean
Central Newcastle Butcher Boys		BYE

==== Round 18 ====
Home	Score	Away	Match Information
Home	Score	Away	Date and Time	Venue	Referee	LeagueCastle's Man of the Match
Lakes United Seagulls	64 – 12	Kurri Kurri Bulldogs	Saturday, 5 August, 3:00pm	Cahill Oval	TBA	Dylan Phythian
Western Suburbs Rosellas	34 – 18	Macquarie Scorpions	Saturday, 5 August, 3:00pm	Harker Oval	TBA	Steve Widders
South Newcastle Lions	36 – 6	Northern Hawks	Sunday, 6 August, 2:00pm	Townson Oval	TBA	Harry Croker
The Entrance Tigers	7 – 12	Maitland Pickers	Sunday, 6 August, 3:00pm	EDSACC Oval	TBA	Lincoln Smith
Central Newcastle Butcher Boys	22 – 28	Cessnock Goannas	Sunday, 6 August, 3:00pm	St John Oval	TBA	Luke Huth
Wyong Roos		BYE

=== Finals Series ===
Qualifying Final
2	South Newcastle	26
3	Cessnock	20
4	Wyong	16
5	The Entrance	17

Major Semi-Final
1	Maitland	24
2	South Newcastle	22
Minor Semi-Final
3	Cessnock	28
5	The Entrance	6

Preliminary Final
2	South Newcastle	28
3	Cessnock	22

Grand Final
1	Maitland	46
2	South Newcastle	10

Home	Score	Away	Match Information
Home	Score	Away	Date and Time	Venue	Referee
Qualifying & Elimination Finals
South Newcastle Lions	26 – 20	Cessnock Goannas	Saturday, 12 August, 2:00pm	Townson Oval	Rob Bowen
Wyong Roos	16 – 17	The Entrance Tigers	Sunday, 13 August, 2:00pm	St John Oval	Joey Butler
Minor & Major Semi-Finals
Maitland Pickers	24 – 22	South Newcastle Lions	Saturday, 19 August, 2:00pm	Maitland Sportsground	Rob Bowen
Cessnock Goannas	28 – 6	The Entrance Tigers	Sunday, 20 August, 2:00pm	Baddeley Park	Joey Butler
Preliminary Final
South Newcastle Lions	28 – 22	Cessnock Goannas	Saturday, 26 August, 2:00pm	Kurri Kurri Sports Ground	Joey Butler
Grand Final
Maitland Pickers	46 – 10	South Newcastle Lions	Sunday, 3 September, 2:00pm	McDonald Jones Stadium	Joey Butler

== Southern Conference (Mojo Homes Illawarra Cup) ==
The 2023 Mojo Homes Illawarra Cup will feature 6 teams, down 2 from the 8 that competed in 2022.

2023 Mojo Homes Illawarra Cup
- Duration: 22 April – 2 September 2023
- Teams: 6
- Broadcast partners: Bar TV Sports

=== Teams ===
Colours	Club	Presidents Cup Season	Home ground(s)	Head coach
	Collegians Collie Dogs	3rd season	Collegians Sports Stadium	TBA
	Corrimal Cougars	3rd season	Ziems Park	TBA
	Dapto Canaries	3rd season	Groundz Precinct	TBA
	De La Salle Caringbah	2nd season	Captain Cook Oval	TBA
	Thirroul Butchers	3rd season	Thomas Gibson Park	TBA
	Western Suburbs Red Devils	4th season	Sid Parish Park	TBA

=== Ladder ===
Pos	Team	Pld	W	D	L	B	PF	PA	PD	Pts
1	De La Salle Caringbah	15	11	1	3	0	439	273	+166	23
2	Collegians Collie Dogs	15	11	0	4	0	390	238	+152	22
3	Western Suburbs Red Devils	15	9	1	5	0	388	256	+132	19
4	Thirroul Butchers	15	7	0	8	0	357	255	+102	14
5	Dapto Canaries	15	5	0	10	0	292	446	–154	10
6	Corrimal Cougars	15	1	0	14	0	148	546	–398	2

Updated to match(es) played on 12 August 2023. Source:
Rules for classification: 1) points; 2) point difference; 3) points scored

==== Ladder progression ====
- Numbers highlighted in green indicate that the team finished the round inside the top 4.
- Numbers highlighted in blue indicates the team finished first on the ladder in that round.
- Numbers highlighted in red indicates the team finished last place on the ladder in that round.
- Underlined numbers indicate that the team had a bye during that round.

Pos	Team	1	2	3	4	5	6	7	8	9	10	11	12	13	14	15
1	De La Salle Caringbah	2	3	5	7	9	9	9	11	11	13	15	17	19	21	23
2	Collegians Collie Dogs	2	4	6	6	6	8	10	12	14	16	18	18	20	20	22
3	Western Suburbs Red Devils	2	3	5	7	9	11	13	15	15	15	15	15	17	19	19
4	Thirroul Butchers	0	2	2	2	4	6	8	8	10	10	10	12	12	12	14
5	Dapto Canaries	0	0	0	2	2	2	2	2	4	6	8	10	10	10	10
6	Corrimal Cougars	0	0	0	0	0	0	0	0	0	0	0	0	0	2	2

=== Season Results ===
==== Round 1 ====
Home	Score	Away	Match Information
Home	Score	Away	Date and Time	Venue	Referee
Corrimal Cougars	0 – 44	Collegians Collie Dogs	Saturday, 22 April, 3:00pm	Ziems Park	Ethan Klein
Western Suburbs Red Devils	28 – 12	Dapto Canaries	Saturday, 22 April, 3:00pm	Sid Parish Park	Taylor Cleveland
De La Salle Caringbah	18 – 13	Thirroul Butchers	Saturday, 22 April, 3:00pm	Captain Cook Oval	Adam Sirianni

==== Round 2 ====
Home	Score	Away	Match Information
Home	Score	Away	Date and Time	Venue	Referee
Western Suburbs Red Devils	20 – 20	De La Salle Caringbah	Saturday, 29 April, 3:00pm	Sid Parish Park	Taylor Cleveland
Thirroul Butchers	22 – 6	Corrimal Cougars	Saturday, 29 April, 3:00pm	Thomas Gibson Park	Michael Chin
Dapto Canaries	14 – 22	Collegians Collie Dogs	Saturday, 29 April, 3:00pm	Groundz Precinct	Michael Ford

==== Round 3 ====
Home	Score	Away	Match Information
Home	Score	Away	Date and Time	Venue	Referee
Collegians Collie Dogs	24 – 6	Thirroul Butchers	Saturday, 13 May, 3:00pm	Collegians Sports Stadium	William Damato
Dapto Canaries	12 – 50	De La Salle Caringbah	Saturday, 13 May, 3:00pm	Groundz Precinct	Karra-Lee Nolan
Corrimal Cougars	0 – 46	Western Suburbs Red Devils	Saturday, 13 May, 3:00pm	Ziems Park	Taylor Cleveland

==== Round 4 ====
Home	Score	Away	Match Information
Home	Score	Away	Date and Time	Venue	Referee
Corrimal Cougars	6 – 50	Dapto Canaries	Saturday, 20 May, 12:15pm	WIN Stadium	Michael Chin
Collegians Collie Dogs	14 – 28	De La Salle Caringbah	Saturday, 20 May, 2:00pm	WIN Stadium	Mitch Currie
Western Suburbs Red Devils	20 – 16	Thirroul Butchers	Saturday, 20 May, 3:45pm	WIN Stadium	Lachlan Greenfield

==== Round 5 ====
Home	Score	Away	Match Information
Home	Score	Away	Date and Time	Venue	Referee
Thirroul Butchers	32 – 10	Dapto Canaries	Saturday, 27 May, 3:00pm	Thomas Gibson Park	TBA
De La Salle Caringbah	30 – 16	Corrimal Cougars	Saturday, 27 May, 3:00pm	Captain Cook Oval	TBA
Collegians Collie Dogs	10 – 22	Western Suburbs Red Devils	Saturday, 27 May, 3:00pm	Collegians Sports Stadium	TBA

==== Round 6 ====
Home	Score	Away	Match Information
Home	Score	Away	Date and Time	Venue	Referee
Thirroul Butchers	40 – 14	De La Salle Caringbah	Saturday, 3 June, 3:00pm	Thomas Gibson Park	TBA
Dapto Canaries	10 – 36	Western Suburbs Red Devils	Saturday, 3 June, 3:00pm	Groundz Precinct	TBA
Collegians Collie Dogs	34 – 4	Corrimal Cougars	Saturday, 3 June, 3:00pm	Collegians Sports Stadium	TBA

==== Round 7 ====
Home	Score	Away	Match Information
Home	Score	Away	Date and Time	Venue	Referee
Collegians Collie Dogs	52 – 22	Dapto Canaries	Saturday, 17 June, 3:00pm	Collegians Sports Stadium	TBA
Western Suburbs Red Devils	40 – 26	De La Salle Caringbah	Saturday, 17 June, 3:00pm	Sid Parish Park	TBA
Corrimal Cougars	0 – 50	Thirroul Butchers	Saturday, 17 June, 3:00pm	Ziems Park	TBA

==== Round 8 ====
Home	Score	Away	Match Information
Home	Score	Away	Date and Time	Venue	Referee
Western Suburbs Red Devils	38 – 8	Corrimal Cougars	Saturday, 24 June, 3:00pm	Sid Parish Park	TBA
De La Salle Caringbah	38 – 20	Dapto Canaries	Saturday, 24 June, 3:00pm	Captain Cook Oval	TBA
Thirroul Butchers	16 – 26	Collegians Collie Dogs	Saturday, 24 June, 3:00pm	Thomas Gibson Park	TBA

==== Round 9 ====
Home	Score	Away	Match Information
Home	Score	Away	Date and Time	Venue	Referee
Dapto Canaries	32 – 18	Corrimal Cougars	Saturday, 1 July, 3:00pm	Groundz Precinct	TBA
De La Salle Caringbah	16 – 28	Collegians Collie Dogs	Saturday, 1 July, 3:00pm	Captain Cook Oval	TBA
Thirroul Butchers	24 – 16	Western Suburbs Red Devils	Saturday, 1 July, 3:00pm	Thomas Gibson Park	TBA

==== Round 10 ====
Home	Score	Away	Match Information
Home	Score	Away	Date and Time	Venue	Referee
Dapto Canaries	22 – 18	Thirroul Butchers	Saturday, 8 July, 3:00pm	Groundz Precinct	TBA
Corrimal Cougars	10 – 26	De La Salle Caringbah	Saturday, 8 July, 3:00pm	Ziems Park	TBA
Western Suburbs Red Devils	4 – 26	Collegians Collie Dogs	Saturday, 8 July, 3:00pm	Sid Parish Park	TBA

==== Round 11 ====
Home	Score	Away	Match Information
Home	Score	Away	Date and Time	Venue	Referee
Corrimal Cougars	26 – 34	Collegians Collie Dogs	Saturday, 15 July, 3:00pm	Ziems Park	TBA
Western Suburbs Red Devils	30 – 32	Dapto Canaries	Saturday, 15 July, 3:00pm	Sid Parish Park	TBA
De La Salle Caringbah	27 – 26	Thirroul Butchers	Saturday, 15 July, 3:00pm	Captain Cook Oval	TBA

==== Round 12 ====
Home	Score	Away	Match Information
Home	Score	Away	Date and Time	Venue	Referee
Thirroul Butchers	30 – 18	Corrimal Cougars	Saturday, 22 July, 3:00pm	Thomas Gibson Park	TBA
Dapto Canaries	20 – 14	Collegians Collie Dogs	Saturday, 22 July, 3:00pm	Groundz Precinct	TBA
De La Salle Caringbah	34 – 18	Western Suburbs Red Devils	Saturday, 22 July, 3:00pm	Henson Park	TBA

==== Round 13 ====
Home	Score	Away	Match Information
Home	Score	Away	Date and Time	Venue	Referee
Dapto Canaries	10 – 34	De La Salle Caringbah	Saturday, 29 July, 3:00pm	Groundz Precinct	TBA
Corrimal Cougars	0 – 38	Western Suburbs Red Devils	Saturday, 29 July, 3:00pm	Ziems Park	TBA
Collegians Collie Dogs	28 – 22	Thirroul Butchers	Saturday, 29 July, 3:00pm	Collegians Sports Stadium	TBA

==== Round 14 ====
Home	Score	Away	Match Information
Home	Score	Away	Date and Time	Venue	Referee
Corrimal Cougars	36 – 18	Dapto Canaries	Saturday, 5 August, 3:00pm	Ziems Park	TBA
Western Suburbs Red Devils	18 – 10	Thirroul Butchers	Saturday, 5 August, 3:00pm	Sid Parish Park	TBA
De La Salle Caringbah	24 – 6	Collegians Collie Dogs	Saturday, 5 August, 3:00pm	Captain Cook Oval	TBA

==== Round 15 ====
Home	Score	Away	Match Information
Home	Score	Away	Date and Time	Venue	Referee
Collegians Collie Dogs	28 – 14	Western Suburbs Red Devils	Saturday, 12 August, 3:00pm	Collegians Sports Stadium	TBA
De La Salle Caringbah	54 – 0	Corrimal Cougars	Saturday, 12 August, 3:00pm	Sutherland Oval	TBA
Thirroul Butchers	32 – 8	Dapto Canaries	Saturday, 12 August, 3:00pm	Thomas Gibson Park	TBA

=== Finals Series ===
Minor & Major Semi-Finals
1	De La Salle	6
2	Collegians	24
3	Western Suburbs	16
4	Thirroul	18

Preliminary Final
1	De La Salle	16
4	Thirroul	26

Grand Final
2	Collegians	18
4	Thirroul	24

Home	Score	Away	Match Information
Home	Score	Away	Date and Time	Venue	Referee
Minor & Major Semi-Finals
Western Suburbs Red Devils	16 – 18	Thirroul Butchers	Saturday, 19 August, 3:00pm	Collegians Sports Stadium	Lachlan Greenfield
De La Salle Caringbah	6 – 24	Collegians Collie Dogs	Saturday, 19 August, 4:45pm	Collegians Sports Stadium	Taylor Cleveland
Preliminary Final
De La Salle Caringbah	16 – 26	Thirroul Butchers	Saturday, 26 August, 3:00pm	Collegians Sports Stadium	Lachlan Greenfield
Grand Final
Collegians Collie Dogs	18 – 24	Thirroul Butchers	Saturday, 2 September, 3:00pm	WIN Stadium	Lachlan Greenfield

== Western Conference (Peter McDonald Premiership) ==
2023 Peter McDonald Premiership
- Duration: 1 April – TBA
- Teams: 12
- Broadcast partners: PAV Sports

The 2023 Peter McDonald Premiership will feature a merged competition between the former Group 10 and Group 11 competitions. The competition format will be two conferences, with the top 4 from each conference qualifying for an 8 team finals series. The winner of each conference will win the Group 10 and Group 11 Premierships.

=== Teams ===
==== Group 10 ====
Colours	Club	Presidents Cup Season	Home ground(s)	Head coach
	Bathurst Panthers	2nd season	Carrington Park	TBA
	Bathurst St Patricks	2nd season	Jack Arrow Sporting Complex	TBA
	Lithgow Workies Wolves	2nd season	Tony Luchetti Sportsground	TBA
	Mudgee Dragons	2nd season	Glen Willow Regional Sports Stadium	TBA
	Orange CYMS	2nd season	Wade Park	TBA
	Orange Hawks	2nd season	Wade Park	TBA

==== Group 11 ====
Colours	Club	Presidents Cup Season	Home ground(s)	Head coach
	Dubbo CYMS	2nd season	Apex Oval	TBA
	Dubbo Macquarie Raiders	2nd season	Apex Oval	TBA
	Forbes Magpies	2nd season	Spooner Oval	TBA
	Nyngan Tigers	2nd season	Larkin Oval	TBA
	Parkes Spacemen	2nd season	Pioneer Oval	TBA
	Wellington Cowboys	2nd season	Kennard Park	TBA

=== Group 10 Ladder ===
Pos	Team	Pld	W	D	L	B	PF	PA	PD	Pts	Qualification
1	Mudgee Dragons	14	11	0	3	1	376	254	+122	24	Group 10 Premiers & Qualification to Finals Series
2	Orange Hawks	14	9	0	5	1	312	270	+42	20	Qualification to Finals Series
3	Bathurst Panthers	14	8	0	6	1	346	304	+42	18	Qualification to Finals Series
4	Bathurst St Patricks	14	7	0	7	1	385	295	+90	16	Qualification to Finals Series
5	Lithgow Workies Wolves	14	3	0	11	1	232	412	-180	8	
6	Orange CYMS	14	1	0	13	1	156	604	-448	4	

Updated to match(es) played on 13 August 2023. Source:
Rules for classification: 1) points; 2) point difference; 3) points scored

==== Ladder progression ====
- Numbers highlighted in green indicate that the team finished the round inside the top 4.
- Numbers highlighted in blue indicates the team finished first on the ladder in that round.
- Numbers highlighted in red indicates the team finished last place on the ladder in that round.
- Underlined numbers indicate that the team had a bye during that round.

Pos	Team	1	2	3	4	5	6	7	8	9	10	11	12	13	14	15
1	Mudgee Dragons	2	4	6	8	10	12	12	14	14	16	18	20	22	24	24
2	Orange Hawks	0	0	2	2	4	6	6	8	10	12	14	16	16	18	20
3	Bathurst Panthers	0	0	2	4	4	6	6	8	8	8	10	12	14	16	18
4	Bathurst St Patricks	2	2	2	4	6	10	10	10	10	12	12	14	16	16	16
5	Lithgow Workies Wolves	0	0	0	0	0	2	2	4	4	4	4	6	6	6	8
6	Orange CYMS	0	0	0	0	0	0	0	0	2	2	2	4	4	4	4

=== Group 11 Ladder ===
Pos	Team	Pld	W	D	L	B	PF	PA	PD	Pts	Qualification
1	Dubbo CYMS	14	11	0	3	1	468	176	+296	24	Group 11 Premiers & Qualification to Finals Series
2	Parkes Spacemen	14	9	0	5	1	398	289	+109	20	Qualification to Finals Series
3	Wellington Cowboys	14	9	0	5	1	316	320	–4	20	Qualification to Finals Series
4	Nyngan Tigers	14	7	1	6	1	391	395	–4	17	Qualification to Finals Series
5	Dubbo Macquarie Raiders	14	4	1	9	1	333	314	+19	11	
6	Forbes Magpies	14	3	2	9	1	258	344	–86	10	

Updated to match(es) played on 13 August 2023. Source:
Rules for classification: 1) points; 2) point difference; 3) points scored

==== Ladder progression ====
- Numbers highlighted in green indicate that the team finished the round inside the top 4.
- Numbers highlighted in blue indicates the team finished first on the ladder in that round.
- Numbers highlighted in red indicates the team finished last place on the ladder in that round.
- Underlined numbers indicate that the team had a bye during that round.

Pos	Team	1	2	3	4	5	6	7	8	9	10	11	12	13	14	15
1	Dubbo CYMS	2	4	6	6	8	12	12	14	16	18	18	20	22	24	24
2	Parkes Spacemen	2	4	4	6	8	10	10	12	14	16	16	16	18	20	20
3	Wellington Cowboys	2	4	4	6	6	8	8	8	10	10	12	14	16	18	20
4	Nyngan Tigers	0	2	4	6	6	6	8	8	8	9	11	13	15	15	17
5	Dubbo Macquarie Raiders	2	2	3	3	3	5	5	5	7	7	9	9	11	11	11
6	Forbes Magpies	0	2	3	3	5	5	5	5	5	6	6	6	8	8	10

=== Season results ===
==== Round 1 ====
Home	Score	Away	Match Information
Home	Score	Away	Date and Time	Venue	Referee
Mudgee Dragons	26 – 18	Forbes Magpies	Saturday, 1 April, 12:30pm	Glen Willow Regional Sports Stadium	TBA
Bathurst St Patricks	33 – 32	Nyngan Tigers	Saturday, 15 April, 2:45pm	Jack Arrow Sporting Complex	TBA
Dubbo CYMS	60 – 0	Bathurst Panthers	Sunday, 16 April, 2:30pm	Apex Oval	TBA
Parkes Spacemen	40 – 14	Orange Hawks	Sunday, 16 April, 2:30pm	Pioneer Oval	TBA
Orange CYMS	12 – 52	Dubbo Macquarie Raiders	Sunday, 16 April, 2:30pm	Wade Park	TBA
Wellington Cowboys	20 – 12	Lithgow Workies Wolves	Sunday, 16 April, 2:30pm	Kennard Park	TBA

==== Round 2 ====
Home	Score	Away	Match Information
Home	Score	Away	Date and Time	Venue	Referee
Wellington Cowboys	18 – 16	Bathurst St Patricks	Saturday, 22 April, 2:15pm	Kennard Park	Simon Hartas
Forbes Magpies	40 – 12	Orange CYMS	Saturday, 22 April, 2:30pm	Spooner Oval	Justin Walker
Lithgow Workies Wolves	8 – 32	Dubbo CYMS	Saturday, 22 April, 2:30pm	Tony Luchetti Sportsground	Bryce Hotham
Bathurst Panthers	6 – 34	Parkes Spacemen	Saturday, 22 April, 2:30pm	Molong Recreation Ground	Nicholas McGrath
Nyngan Tigers	40 – 12	Orange Hawks	Sunday, 23 April, 2:15pm	Larkin Oval	Simon Hartas
Dubbo Macquarie Raiders	22 – 24	Mudgee Dragons	Sunday, 23 April, 2:30pm	Apex Oval	Anthony Pond

==== Round 3 ====
Home	Score	Away	Match Information
Home	Score	Away	Date and Time	Venue	Referee
Bathurst St Patricks	20 – 28	Bathurst Panthers	Saturday, 29 April, 3:15pm	Carrington Park	Anthony Pond
Orange CYMS	18 – 34	Mudgee Dragons	Saturday, 29 April, 3:30pm	Wade Park	Bryce Hotham
Dubbo CYMS	32 – 14	Wellington Cowboys	Sunday, 30 April, 2:00pm	Apex Oval	Simon Hartas
Nyngan Tigers	32 – 28	Parkes Spacemen	Sunday, 30 April, 2:00pm	Larkin Oval	Michael Madgwick
Forbes Magpies	14 – 14	Dubbo Macquarie Raiders	Sunday, 30 April, 2:00pm	Spooner Oval	Justin Walker
Orange Hawks	14 – 0	Lithgow Workies Wolves	Sunday, 30 April, 2:00pm	Wade Park	Nicholas McGrath

==== Round 4 ====
Home	Score	Away	Match Information
Home	Score	Away	Date and Time	Venue	Referee
Lithgow Workies Wolves	20 – 48	Bathurst St Patricks	Saturday, 13 May, 3:30pm	Tony Luchetti Sportsground	Bryce Hotham
Parkes Spacemen	40 – 28	Dubbo CYMS	Saturday, 13 May, 3:30pm	Pioneer Oval	Justin Walker
Orange Hawks	18 – 20	Mudgee Dragons	Saturday, 13 May, 3:30pm	Wade Park	Anthony Pond
Dubbo Macquarie Raiders	18 – 26	Nyngan Tigers	Sunday, 14 May, 2:00pm	Apex Oval	Simon Hartas
Bathurst Panthers	42 – 10	Orange CYMS	Sunday, 14 May, 2:00pm	Carrington Park	Nicholas Lander
Wellington Cowboys	24 – 14	Forbes Magpies	Sunday, 14 May, 2:00pm	Kennard Park	Brendan Neville

==== Round 5 ====
Home	Score	Away	Match Information
Home	Score	Away	Date and Time	Venue	Referee
Mudgee Dragons	42 – 10	Lithgow Workies Wolves	Saturday, 20 May, 3:30pm	Glen Willow Regional Sports Stadium	TBA
Orange CYMS	12 – 42	Bathurst St Patricks	Saturday, 20 May, 3:30pm	Wade Park	TBA
Dubbo Macquarie Raiders	4 – 20	Dubbo CYMS	Sunday, 21 May, 2:00pm	Apex Oval	TBA
Bathurst Panthers	12 – 16	Orange Hawks	Sunday, 21 May, 2:00pm	Carrington Park	TBA
Nyngan Tigers	20 – 30	Forbes Magpies	Sunday, 21 May, 2:00pm	Larkin Oval	TBA
Parkes Spacemen	26 – 24	Wellington Cowboys	Sunday, 21 May, 2:00pm	Pioneer Oval	TBA

==== Round 6 ====
Home	Score	Away	Match Information
Home	Score	Away	Date and Time	Venue	Referee
Orange CYMS	4 – 40	Orange Hawks	Saturday, 27 May, 3:30pm	Wade Park	TBA
Wellington Cowboys	30 – 26	Dubbo Macquarie Raiders	Saturday, 27 May, 3:30pm	Kennard Park	TBA
Dubbo CYMS	54 – 6	Nyngan Tigers	Sunday, 28 May, 2:00pm	Apex Oval	TBA
Mudgee Dragons	10 – 42	Bathurst St Patricks	Sunday, 28 May, 2:00pm	Glen Willow Regional Sports Stadium	TBA
Bathurst Panthers	24 – 22	Lithgow Workies Wolves	Sunday, 28 May, 2:00pm	Carrington Park	TBA
Parkes Spacemen	28 – 18	Forbes Magpies	Sunday, 11 June, 2:00pm	Pioneer Oval	Anthony Pond

==== Round 7 ====
Home	Score	Away	Match Information
Home	Score	Away	Date and Time	Venue	Referee
Lithgow Workies Wolves	34 – 22	Orange CYMS	Saturday, 3 June, 3:30pm	Tony Luchetti Sportsground	TBA
Dubbo Macquarie Raiders	22 – 6	Parkes Spacemen	Sunday, 4 June, 12:00pm	Apex Oval	TBA
Mudgee Dragons	24 – 22	Bathurst Panthers	Sunday, 4 June, 2:00pm	Glen Willow Regional Sports Stadium	TBA
Bathurst St Patricks	32 – 6	Orange Hawks	Sunday, 4 June, 2:00pm	Jack Arrow Sporting Complex	TBA
Forbes Magpies	20 – 24	Dubbo CYMS	Sunday, 4 June, 2:00pm	Spooner Oval	TBA
Nyngan Tigers	36 – 24	Wellington Cowboys	Sunday, 18 June, 2:00pm	Larkin Oval	TBA

==== Round 8 ====
Home	Score	Away	Match Information
Home	Score	Away	Date and Time	Venue	Referee
Dubbo CYMS	60 – 0	Orange CYMS	Sunday, 25 June, 2:00pm	Apex Oval	TBA
Bathurst St Patricks	18 – 22	Parkes Spacemen	Sunday, 25 June, 2:00pm	Jack Arrow Sporting Complex	TBA
Nyngan Tigers	20 – 36	Mudgee Dragons	Sunday, 25 June, 2:00pm	Larkin Oval	TBA
Forbes Magpies	16 – 30	Bathurst Panthers	Sunday, 25 June, 2:00pm	Spooner Oval	TBA
Lithgow Workies Wolves	20 – 18	Dubbo Macquarie Raiders	Sunday, 25 June, 2:00pm	Tony Luchetti Sportsground	TBA
Orange Hawks	36 – 20	Wellington Cowboys	Sunday, 25 June, 2:00pm	Wade Park	TBA

==== Round 9 ====
Home	Score	Away	Match Information
Home	Score	Away	Date and Time	Venue	Referee
Mudgee Dragons	12 – 18	Dubbo CYMS	Saturday, 1 July, 3:30pm	Glen Willow Regional Sports Stadium	TBA
Orange CYMS	30 – 28	Nyngan Tigers	Saturday, 1 July, 3:30pm	Wade Park	TBA
Dubbo Macquarie Raiders	41 – 26	Bathurst St Patricks	Sunday, 2 July, 2:00pm	Apex Oval	TBA
Bathurst Panthers	12 – 42	Wellington Cowboys	Sunday, 2 July, 2:00pm	Carrington Park	TBA
Parkes Spacemen	42 – 6	Lithgow Workies Wolves	Sunday, 2 July, 2:00pm	Pioneer Oval	TBA
Orange Hawks	24 – 22	Forbes Magpies	Sunday, 2 July, 2:00pm	Wade Park	TBA

==== Round 10 ====
Home	Score	Away	Match Information
Home	Score	Away	Date and Time	Venue	Referee
Bathurst St Patricks	36 – 10	Orange CYMS	Saturday, 8 July, 3:30pm	Jack Arrow Sporting Complex	TBA
Lithgow Workies Wolves	10 – 24	Mudgee Dragons	Saturday, 8 July, 3:30pm	Tony Luchetti Sportsground	TBA
Dubbo CYMS	28 – 14	Dubbo Macquarie Raiders	Sunday, 9 July, 2:00pm	Apex Oval	TBA
Forbes Magpies	26 – 26	Nyngan Tigers	Sunday, 9 July, 2:00pm	Spooner Oval	TBA
Orange Hawks	16 – 12	Bathurst Panthers	Sunday, 9 July, 2:00pm	Wade Park	TBA
Wellington Cowboys	6 – 40	Parkes Spacemen	Sunday, 9 July, 2:00pm	Kennard Park	TBA

==== Round 11 ====
Home	Score	Away	Match Information
Home	Score	Away	Date and Time	Venue	Referee
Lithgow Workies Wolves	20 – 30	Orange Hawks	Saturday, 15 July, 3:30pm	Tony Luchetti Sportsground	TBA
Dubbo Macquarie Raiders	40 – 14	Forbes Magpies	Sunday, 16 July, 2:00pm	Apex Oval	TBA
Bathurst Panthers	26 – 14	Bathurst St Patricks	Sunday, 16 July, 2:00pm	Carrington Park	TBA
Mudgee Dragons	44 – 4	Orange CYMS	Sunday, 16 July, 2:00pm	Glen Willow Regional Sports Stadium	TBA
Parkes Spacemen	30 – 49	Nyngan Tigers	Sunday, 16 July, 2:00pm	Pioneer Oval	TBA
Wellington Cowboys	20 – 18	Dubbo CYMS	Sunday, 16 July, 2:00pm	Kennard Park	TBA

==== Round 12 ====
Home	Score	Away	Match Information
Home	Score	Away	Date and Time	Venue	Referee
Dubbo CYMS	38 – 12	Parkes Spacemen	Sunday, 23 July, 2:00pm	Apex Oval	TBA
Nyngan Tigers	30 – 28	Dubbo Macquarie Raiders	Sunday, 23 July, 2:00pm	Larkin Oval	TBA
Forbes Magpies	6 – 20	Wellington Cowboys	Sunday, 23 July, 2:00pm	Spooner Oval	TBA
Lithgow Workies Wolves	BYE	Bathurst St Patricks
Bathurst Panthers	BYE	Mudgee Dragons
Orange CYMS	BYE	Orange Hawks

==== Round 13 ====
Home	Score	Away	Match Information
Home	Score	Away	Date and Time	Venue	Referee
Bathurst St Patricks	38 – 26	Lithgow Workies Wolves	Saturday, 29 July, 2:00pm	Jack Arrow Sporting Complex	TBA
Mudgee Dragons	40 – 16	Orange Hawks	Saturday, 29 July, 3:30pm	Glen Willow Regional Sports Stadium	TBA
Orange CYMS	6 – 66	Bathurst Panthers	Sunday, 30 July, 2:00pm	Wade Park	TBA
Dubbo Macquarie Raiders	BYE	Forbes Magpies
Wellington Cowboys	BYE	Parkes Spacemen
Nyngan Tigers	BYE	Dubbo CYMS

==== Round 14 ====
Home	Score	Away	Match Information
Home	Score	Away	Date and Time	Venue	Referee
Lithgow Workies Wolves	12 – 46	Bathurst Panthers	Saturday, 5 August, 3:30pm	Tony Luchetti Sportsground	TBA
Bathurst St Patricks	16 – 28	Mudgee Dragons	Sunday, 6 August, 2:00pm	Jack Arrow Sporting Complex	TBA
Parkes Spacemen	40 – 12	Dubbo Macquarie Raiders	Sunday, 6 August, 2:00pm	Pioneer Oval	TBA
Dubbo CYMS	46 – 4	Forbes Magpies	Sunday, 6 August, 2:00pm	Spooner Oval	TBA
Orange Hawks	54 – 4	Orange CYMS	Sunday, 6 August, 2:00pm	Wade Park	TBA
Wellington Cowboys	32 – 24	Nyngan Tigers	Sunday, 6 August, 2:00pm	Kennard Park	TBA

==== Round 15 ====
Home	Score	Away	Match Information
Home	Score	Away	Date and Time	Venue	Referee
Orange CYMS	12 – 32	Lithgow Workies Wolves	Saturday, 12 August, 2:00pm	Wade Park	TBA
Dubbo Macquarie Raiders	22 – 24	Wellington Cowboys	Sunday, 13 August, 2:00pm	Apex Oval	TBA
Bathurst Panthers	20 – 12	Mudgee Dragons	Sunday, 13 August, 2:00pm	Carrington Park	TBA
Nyngan Tigers	22 – 14	Dubbo CYMS	Sunday, 13 August, 2:00pm	Larkin Oval	TBA
Forbes Magpies	16 – 10	Parkes Spacemen	Sunday, 13 August, 2:00pm	Spooner Oval	TBA
Orange Hawks	16 – 4	Bathurst St Patricks	Sunday, 13 August, 2:00pm	Wade Park	TBA

=== Finals Series ===
Qualifying / Elimination Finals
1	Dubbo	28
2	Orange	6
3	Bathurst	32
4	Nyngan	12
3	Wellington	30
4	Bathurst	16
1	Mudgee	28
2	Parkes	20

Semi-Finals
2	Orange	36
3	Bathurst	20
2	Parkes	36
3	Wellington	26

Preliminary Finals
1	Mudgee	30
2	Orange	20
1	Dubbo	38
2	Parkes	20

Grand Final
1	Dubbo	25
1	Mudgee	12

Home	Score	Away	Match Information
Home	Score	Away	Date and Time	Venue	Referee
Qualifying & Elimination Finals
Wellington Cowboys	30 – 16	Bathurst St Patricks	Saturday, 19 August, 2:15pm	Kennard Park	Simon Hartas
Bathurst Panthers	32 – 12	Nyngan Tigers	Sunday, 20 August, 2:15pm	Carrington Park	Anthony Pond
Dubbo CYMS	28 – 6	Orange Hawks	Sunday, 20 August, 2:15pm	Apex Oval	Justin Walker
Mudgee Dragons	28 – 20	Parkes Spacemen	Sunday, 20 August, 2:15pm	Glen Willow Regional Sports Stadium	Bryce Hotham
Semi-Finals
Parkes Spacemen	36 – 26	Wellington Cowboys	Sunday, 27 August, 2:30pm	Pioneer Oval	Anthony Pond
Orange Hawks	36 – 20	Bathurst Panthers	Sunday, 27 August, 2:30pm	Wade Park	Simon Hartas
Preliminary Finals
Mudgee Dragons	30 – 20	Orange Hawks	Saturday, 2 September, 2:15pm	Glen Willow Regional Sports Stadium	Anthony Pond
Dubbo CYMS	38 – 20	Parkes Spacemen	Sunday, 3 September, 2:15pm	Apex Oval	Simon Hartas
Grand Final
Dubbo CYMS	25 – 12	Mudgee Dragons	Sunday, 10 September, 2:30pm	Apex Oval	Anthony Pond
