= Geoff Robinson (rugby league, born 1957) =

Australian professional rugby league footballer (1957–2024)

Personal information
- Full name: Geoffrey Robinson
- Born: 14 December 1957 Villawood, New South Wales, Australia
- Died: 3 July 2024 (aged 66)

Playing information
- Height: 180 cm (5 ft 11 in)
- Weight: 92 kg (14 st 7 lb)
- Position: Prop, Second-row
Club
Years	Team	Pld	T	G	FG	P
1977–84	Canterbury-Bankstown	125	4	0	0	13
1985–86	Halifax	30	8	0	0	32
1986	Canterbury-Bankstown	14	2	0	0	8
	Total	169	14	0	0	53

Geoffrey Robinson (14 December 1957 – 3 July 2024), also known by the nickname of "Robbo", was an Australian professional rugby league footballer who played in the 1970s and 1980s. He played for Canterbury-Bankstown in the New South Wales Rugby League (NSWRL) competition. Robinson primarily played at prop.

== Playing career ==
Of English and Maltese descent, At 18, Robinson was graded by Canterbury from the Chester Hill Hornets in 1976. He made his first-grade début against Eastern Suburbs on 28 May 1977, aged 19.

Robinson stood out on the field with his long dark hair, bushy beard and socks around his ankles, he was renowned for his devastating runs at the line.

Robinson was a member of Canterbury-Bankstown's 1980 Premiership winning team in their 18–4 win over Eastern Suburbs and their 1984 Premiership win over Parramatta (6–4).

Robinson played 30 games in all competitions in Halifax's victory in the Championship during the 1985–86 season, before re-joining Canterbury in round 12 of the 1986 NSWRL season. Robinson played in the 1986 Grand Final for Canterbury against Parramatta in which the club lost 4–2.

== Coaching career ==
After retiring from first-grade at the end of 1986, Robinson went on to coach the Canterbury U-23 side to a premiership in 1991. Robinson served as coach with the now defunct Chester Hill Rhinos in the Jim Beam Cup from 2007 to 2009.

== Illness and death ==
Robinson had battled throat and tongue cancer for several years. He died of a suspected heart attack on 3 July 2024, at the age of 66.
