= Bundy Cup =

Bundy Cup may refer to:

- Bundaberg Red Cup, a rugby league football competition in New South Wales, Australia
- Bundy Gold Cup, a rugby league football competition in Queensland, Australia now known as the Queensland Cup
