= Newcastle Knights honours =

This article lists the honours and achievements of the Newcastle Knights, a professional rugby league club based in Newcastle, New South Wales, Australia, competing in the National Rugby League (NRL). The club has won two NRL/ARL premierships, in 1997 and 2001.

== Premiership Honours ==
=== Premierships ===
Year	Opponent	Competition	Score
1997	Manly-Warringah Sea Eagles	ARL	22-16
2001	Parramatta Eels	NRL	30-24

=== World Club Challenges ===
Year	Opponent	Result	Score
2002	Bradford Bulls	Loss	26-41

=== Finals ===
The Knights qualified for the NSWRL/ARL/NRL finals in the following years.
1992, 1995, 1997, 1998, 1999, 2000, 2001, 2002, 2003, 2006, 2009, 2011, 2013, 2020, 2021, 2023, 2026

== Youth Honours ==
=== NSW Cup ===
Premiers: 1995, 2015

Runners-up: 2014

=== NRL National Championship ===
Runners-up: 2015

=== S. G. Ball Cup Honours ===
Premiers: 1990, 2001, 2004, 2011

=== Harold Matthews Cup ===
Premiers: 1992, 2000, 2014, 2017, 2019

=== National Youth Competition ===
Minor Premiers: 2014

=== Jersey Flegg Cup Honours ===
Premiers: 1991, 1992

Minor Premiers: 2006

Runners-up: 2006

=== Jim Beam Cup ===
Premiers: 2003 (The Entrance Tigers), 2007 (The Entrance Tigers)

Runners-up: 2004 (The Entrance Tigers)

== Individual honours ==
Rothmans Medal Winners:

- Mark Sargent (1989)

Dally M Medal Winners:

- Andrew Johns (1998, 1999, 2002)
- Danny Buderus (2004)
- Kalyn Ponga (2023)

Clive Churchill Medal Winners:

- Robbie O'Davis (1997)
- Andrew Johns (2001)
