= Asquith Magpies =

Australian rugby league club, based in Asquith, NSW

Club information
- Full name: Asquith Magpies Rugby League Football Club
- Founded: 1953; 73 years ago

Current details
- Ground: Storey Park
- Coach: Patrick Weisner
- Competition: Ron Massey Cup; Sydney Shield; NSWRL combined U23s

The Asquith Magpies Rugby League Football Club is an Australian rugby league football club based in Asquith, New South Wales formed in 1953. They previously competed in the NSW Ron Massey Cup competition and the Sydney Shield. Asquith are currently a senior feeder club side to NSW Cup team the North Sydney Bears.

== Notable players ==
- Kaeo Weekes (2022- Manly-Warringah Sea Eagles, Canberra Raiders)
- Mitchell Pearce (2007- Sydney Roosters, Newcastle Knights)
- Liam Foran (2008-13 Melbourne Storm, Manly-Warringah Sea Eagles & Salford City Reds)
- Kieran Foran (2009- Manly-Warringah Sea Eagles, Parramatta Eels, New Zealand Warriors & Canterbury-Bankstown Bulldogs)
- Kevin Wilson 1970 to 1976 - then graded to North Sydney Bears playing all Grades including Captain of First Grade.

== Playing Record in NSWRL Competitions ==
=== Tier 3 ===
In three different time-periods, Asquith has entered teams in lower tier competitions run by the New South Wales Rugby League.
The win-loss-draw record in the table below includes Finals Series matches.
Sources: Rugby League Week, Big League, NSWRL Rugby League News, Sydney Morning Herald, Daily Telegraph (Sydney), League Unlimited.

Year	Competition	Ladder			Finals Position	All Match Record						
Year	Competition	Pos	Byes	Pts	Finals Position	P	W	L	D	For	Agst	Diff
1970	Second Division	8	2	14		20	6	12	2	264	347	-83
1971	Second Division	9	2	10		20	5	15	0	223	497	-274
1972	Second Division	1	2	40	Finalist	22	18	4	0	523	248	275
1973	Second Division	3	2	32	Semi-Finalist	22	14	8	0	423	336	87
2005	Jim Beam Cup	7	3	19		19	8	10	1	538	589	-51
2006	Jim Beam Cup	9	2	12		16	3	11	2	319	544	-225
2007	Jim Beam Cup	11	0	8		22	4	18	0	428	806	-378
2013	Ron Massey Cup	11	0	15		22	7	14	1	550	726	-176
2014	Ron Massey Cup	3	0	28	Last 4 Preliminary Finalist	25	14	9	2	676	557	119
2015	Ron Massey Cup	3	2	28	Grand Finalist	24	14	10	0	697	568	129
2016	Ron Massey Cup	9	2	22		20	9	11	0	473	608	-135
2018	Ron Massey Cup	7	2	23	Top 8 Elimination Semi-Finalist	19	9	9	1	417	439	-22
2019	Ron Massey Cup	4	2	27	Last 6 Semi-Finalist	22	11	10	1	482	374	108
2020	Ron Massey Cup	N/A	0	0	Competition Cancelled	1	0	1	0	32	44	-12

=== Tier 4 ===
Year	Competition	Ladder			Finals Position	All Match Record						
Year	Competition	Pos	Byes	Pts	Finals Position	P	W	L	D	For	Agst	Diff
2014	Sydney Shield	11	0	8		22	4	18	0	466	890	-424
2015	Sydney Shield	12	2	15		20	5	14	1	421	616	-195
2016	Sydney Shield	14	0	2		22	1	21	0	137	1270	-1133
2017	Sydney Shield	4	3	34	Last 4 Preliminary Finalist	24	15	9	0	712	594	118
2018	Sydney Shield	5	2	25	Last 6 Semi-Finalist	20	11	8	1	616	482	134
2019	Sydney Shield	8	1	19	Last 6 Semi-Finalist	22	9	12	1	658	612	46
2020	Sydney Shield	N/A	0	0	Withdrew	1	0	1	0	16	20	-4

== See also ==
- List of rugby league clubs in Australia

== Sources ==
Years	Acronym	Item	Available Online	Via
1920 to 1973	RLN	Rugby League News	Yes	Trove
1972-76, 78, 80-81, 1991-96, 1998-2009	-	New South Wales Rugby League Annual Report	No	State Library of NSW
2014-19	-	New South Wales Rugby League Annual Report	Yes	NSWRL website
2003 to 2014	RLW	Rugby League Week	Yes	eResources at State Library of NSW
1974 to 2019	BL	Big League	No	State Library of NSW
2014 to present	LU	League Unlimited	Yes	League Unlimited website
2010 to 2019	-	Various Newspaper Websites	Yes	As referenced
