= Ryde-Eastwood Hawks =

Australian rugby league club based in Ryde, NSW

Club information
- Full name: Ryde-Eastwood Rugby League Football Club
- Colours: Scarlet; White
- Founded: 1963
- Website: On Facebook; Leagues Club History

Current details
- Ground: TG Milner Field
- Coach: David Gower
- Competition: Sydney Shield Ron Massey Cup Presidents Cup

Records
- Premierships: 7 (1972, 1973, 1974, 1975, 1976 (2nd Div), 1990 (Metro), 2019 (SS))
- Runners-up: 10 (1964, 1967 (2nd Div), 1991, 1992, 1993, 1996, 1999, 2000, 2002 (Metro), 2020 (SS))
- Minor premierships: 9 (1967, 1973, 1974, 1975, 1976 (2nd Div), 1990, 1996, 1999 (Metro), 2020 (SS))
- Wooden spoons: Nil (Nil)

The Ryde-Eastwood Rugby League Football Club is an Australian rugby league football club based in Ryde, New South Wales formed in late 1962, with the intent of entering the inaugural Inter-District competition in 1963. This competition became known as Second Division from 1964. They currently play in the Sydney Shield. The club also fields open age (men's and women's) and under age (20s and 18s) teams in Sydney Combined competitions.

The club has previously fielded teams in Balmain District and Parramatta District competitions.

== Playing Record in NSWRL Competitions ==
=== Sydney Shield ===
The club entered the Sydney Shield in 2019.

Year	Competition	Ladder			Finals Position	All Match Record						
Year	Competition	Pos	Byes	Pts	Finals Position	P	W	L	D	For	Agst	Diff
2019	Sydney Shield	4	1	32	Premiers	23	18	5	0	830	444	386
2020	Sydney Shield	N/A	0	2	Competition Cancelled	1	1	0	0	50	8	42
2020	Sydney Shield	1	1	16	Grand Finalist	10	8	2	0	320	176	144

=== NSW Cup ===
In a joint venture with Balmain Football Club, Balmain Ryde-Eastwood competed in the second-tier NSW Cup.

Year	Competition	Ladder			Finals Position	All Match Record						
Year	Competition	Pos	Byes	Pts	Finals Position	P	W	L	D	For	Agst	Diff
2005	Premier League	9	2	24		26	10	14	0	696	533	163
2006	Premier League	6	2	33	Last 6 Semi-Finalist	26	15	10	1	775	654	121
2007	Premier League	3	3	33	Last 4 Preliminary Finalist	24	14	9	1	597	538	59
2008	NSW Cup	8	0	17		24	9	14	1	593	616	-23
2009	NSW Cup	6	2	26	Grand Finalist	24	14	10	0	563	549	14
2010	NSW Cup	2	0	40	Last 4 Preliminary Finalist	27	21	6	0	771	532	239
2011	NSW Cup	8	3	20	Top 8 Elimination Semi-Finalist	23	6	15	2	449	544	-95
2012	NSW Cup	8	2	30	Grand Finalist	28	16	12	0	829	680	149

=== Second Division / Metropolitan Cup ===
Ryde-Eastwood entered the Inter-District competition in 1963. This was renamed as Second Division in 1964 and reorganised as the Metropolitan Cup in 1974. The competition collapsed after the 1976 season. It was revived in 1990. Ryde-Eastwood were premiers on both sides of the 13 season hiatus.

Year	Competition	Ladder			Finals Position	All Match Record						
Year	Competition	Pos	Byes	Pts	Finals Position	P	W	L	D	For	Agst	Diff
1963	Inter-District	6		19		16	9	6	1	174	151	23
1964	Second Division	2	0	26	Grand Finalist	21	14	7	0	159	242	-83
1965	Second Division	5	0	20		18	9	7	1	213	154	59
1966	Second Division	5	0	16		14	8	6	0	141	157	-16
1967	Second Division	1	0	23	Grand Finalist	18	13	4	1	272	165	107
1968	Second Division	8	2	6		16	3	13	0	104	298	-194
1969	Second Division	4	0	19	Semi-Finalist	17	9	7	1	233	198	35
1970	Second Division	6	2	20		20	9	9	2	276	239	37
1971	Second Division	3	2	33	Finalist	22	17	4	1	624	207	417
1972	Second Division	2	2	39	Premiers	22	19	2	1	651	221	430
1973	Second Division	1	2	42	Premiers	22	20	2	0	703	173	530
1974	Metropolitan Cup	1		38	Premiers	22	21	1	0	498	188	310
1975	Metropolitan Cup	1	2	31	Premiers	18	17	0	1	460	143	317
1976	Metropolitan Cup	1	0	30	Premiers	18	17	1	0	422	179	243
1990	Metropolitan Cup	1		25	Premiers							
1991	Metropolitan Cup			21	Grand Finalist							
1992	Metropolitan Cup	2	2	23	Grand Finalist	18	9	7	2	333	324	9
1993	Metropolitan Cup	2	2	25	Grand Finalist	18	12	5	1	373	249	124
1994	Metropolitan Cup	3	0	26	Semi-Finalist	22	13	9	0	467	409	58
1995	Metropolitan Cup	3	2	28	Semi-Finalist	19	11	8	0	439	359	80
1996	Metropolitan Cup	1	2	29	Grand Finalist	18	13	4	1	480	314	166
1997	Metropolitan Cup	4		14								
1998	Metropolitan Cup	5	0	19		18	8	7	3	353	334	19
1999	Metropolitan Cup	1		30	Grand Finalist	18	15	3	0	550	318	232
2000	Metropolitan Cup	2	0	17	Grand Finalist	16	10	5	1	410	326	84
2001	Metropolitan Cup	3	3	26	Semi-Finalist	19	10	9	0	457	422	35
2002	Metropolitan Cup	2	0	18	Grand Finalist	18	10	8	0	438	388	50
2003	Jim Beam Cup	6	0	24		22	11	9	2	553	534	19
2004	Jim Beam Cup	9	2	21		20	8	11	1	436	616	-180

=== AMCO Cup ===
As the previous season's Second Division, Metropolitan Cup premiers, Ryde-Eastwood qualified for the Amco Cup knock-out competition on three consecutive occasions in the mid 1970s.

Year	Opponent	Result	Score
1974	Penrith	Lost	10-18
1975	Southern Division	Won	17-16
1975	Eastern Suburbs	Lost	0-34
1976	Ipswich	Won	29-13
1976	Newtown	Lost	6-32

== Sources ==
Years	Acronym	Item	Available Online	Via
1963 to 2004	-	History of the Hawks 1963 - 2004	No	State Library of NSW
1920 to 1973	RLN	Rugby League News	Yes	Trove
1972–76, 1978, 1980–81, 1991–96, 1998–2009	-	New South Wales Rugby League Annual Report	No	State Library of NSW
2014–19	-	New South Wales Rugby League Annual Report	Yes	NSWRL website
1970 to 2002	RLW	Rugby League Week	No	State Library of NSW
2003 to 2014	RLW	Rugby League Week	Yes	eResources at State Library of NSW
1974 to 2019	BL	Big League	No	State Library of NSW
2014 to present	LU	League Unlimited	Yes	League Unlimited website
2010 to 2019	-	Various Newspaper Websites	Yes	As referenced
