= Rugby League Review =

- Editor: Terry Liberopoulos
- Categories: Sports magazine
- Frequency: Bimonthly
- Publisher: Terry Liberopoulos
- Founder: Terry Liberopoulos
- Founded: 2002; 24 years ago
- Country: Australia
- Based in: Sydney
- Language: English
- Website: www.rugbyleaguereview.com

Rugby League Review is a bi-monthly magazine owned by the Australian media company TL Sports Publications and is currently the only rugby league magazine being published in Australia. It was first published in October 2002 and features articles on all aspects of the game including the NRL, State Cups, Juniors, Women's Rugby League, International Rugby League and a look back at how the game used to be.

== See also ==
- Big League
- Rugby League Week
