= Greg Clements =

Australian rugby league footballer

Personal information
- Full name: Greg Clements
- Born: 29 September 1963 (age 61)

Playing information
- Position: Five-eighth, Halfback
Club
Years	Team	Pld	T	G	FG	P
1983–89	Penrith Panthers	75	16	5	1	75

Greg Clements (born 29 September 1963) is an Australian former professional rugby league footballer who played during the 1980s. He played his entire club football career with the Penrith Panthers. He played primarily at five-eighth, but also played the occasional game at halfback

== Playing career ==
An Erina junior, Clements was graded by the Panthers in 1982. He made his first grade debut from the bench in his side's 40−18 loss to the North Sydney Bears at North Sydney Oval in round 5 of the 1983 season, he played the remainder of the season at halfback. With the arrival of Greg Alexander in the 1984 season, Clements shifted into the forwards. He remained in the forwards until the end of the 1985 season. Clements made his lone appearance in a finals match in the 1985 season when the Panthers (in their first ever finals match in the club's history) lost 38−6 to the Parramatta Eels at the SCG.

In 1986, Clements was shifted into the five eighth position where he would predominantly play for the remainder of his career, and formed a formidable halves combination with Greg Alexander. Clements had his best season at the club in the 1986 season, he played in 23 of his side's 24 games, and scored 6 tries. Clements would remain with the Panthers until the end of the 1989 season. His final game in first grade was in his side's 31−2 victory over the North Sydney Bears at North Sydney Oval in round 17 of the 1989 season, where he would play the solitary match at halfback. In total, Clements played 75 games, and scored 16 tries, and kicked 5 goals and 1 field goal.

After his departure from Penrith, he was the premiership winning captain-coach for the Erina Eagles in the Central Coast competition in 1991, before heading out west to play at both Cowra in 1991 and Cootamundra in 1992, whereupon he retired as a player. He has since become a club stalwart at the Cowra Magpies in a coaching capacity.
