= Ron Massey Cup =

Australian semi-professional rugby league competition

- Current season or competition: 2025 NSWRL Major Competitions
- Sport: Rugby league
- Formerly known as: Inter-District Competition; Second Division; Metropolitan League; Metropolitan Cup; Jim Beam Cup; Bundaberg Red Cup
- Instituted: 1963; 63 years ago
- Inaugural season: 1963
- Number of teams: 10
- Country: Australia
- Premiers: St Marys Saints (2026)
- Most titles: Wentworthville Magpies (17 titles)
- Website: Ron Massey Cup
- Related competition: KOE NSW Cup; Sydney Shield; Presidents Cup; NSW Challenge Cup

The Ron Massey Cup (formerly known as the Bundaberg Red Cup and Jim Beam Cup) is a semi-professional development level rugby league competition in New South Wales (NSW), Australia, run by the New South Wales Rugby League (NSWRL). The competition is run concurrently with the National Rugby League (NRL). It currently comprises 13 teams drawn from the Sydney metropolitan area. The competition is named after Ron Massey, a former rugby league coach. Ron Massey died on 19 September 2016.

The competition is an expanded version of the former Metropolitan Cup and Second Division competitions. The competition was renamed the Bundaberg Red Cup after the 2008 season (the last Jim Beam Cup season), after Bundaberg Rum replaced former sponsor Jim Beam. For the 2013 season, the competition was re-branded as the Ron Massey Cup in honour of the former coach, tactician, mentor and administrator.

== Clubs ==
Ten teams are competing in the 2026 Ron Massey Cup. The fixture list is available on the NSWRL website.

| Colours | Club | Location (all NSW) | Stadium | Premierships | Founded | Joined* |
|---|---|---|---|---|---|---|
| | Blacktown Workers | Blacktown | H.E. Laybutt Fields | None | 1964 | 2012 |
| | Canterbury-Bankstown Bulldogs | Belmore | Hammondville Oval | None | 1937 | 2023 |
| | Glebe Dirty Reds | Glebe | Goddard Park | 2024 | 1908 | 2015^{a} |
| | Hills District Bulls | Baulkham Hills | Crestwood Oval | 2022 | 1964 | 2016 |
| | Manly Leagues | Manly | Lionel Watts Park, Brookvale Oval, Sydney Academy of Sport and Recreation | None | 1947 | 2025 |
| | Mounties RLFC | Mount Pritchard | Aubrey Keech Reserve | 2015-16 | 1927 | 2009^{b} |
| | Penrith Brothers | Penrith | Parker St Reserve | None | 1968 | 2009^{c} |
| | Ryde-Eastwood Hawks | Ryde | TG Milner Field | 1972, 1974-76, 1990, 2000 | 1962 | 2003^{d} |
| | St Marys Saints | St Marys | St Marys Leagues Stadium | 1993-94, 2001, 2023, 2025 | 1908 | 2016^{e} |
| | Wentworthville Magpies | Wentworthville | Ringrose Park | 1964-65, 1967-71, 1973, 1998-99, 2009-20, 2012-13, 2017-19 | 1963 | 2003 |

*: The season the team joined is in the Jim Beam Cup/Bundaberg Red Cup/Ron Massey Cup, not any other competition before this.
1. Glebe previously competed as Concord-Burwood Wolves in 2015 and 2016, as Concord-Burwood Glebe Wolves in 2017 and as Glebe-Burwood-Concord Wolves from 2018 to 2020.
2. Mounties competed in the Metropolitan Cup from 1990 to 1994.
3. Penrith Brothers did not compete from 2011 to 2017, nor from 2020 to 2022.
4. Ryde Eastwood did not compete from 2005 to 2020.
5. St Marys previously competed as a merged entity in 2003.

=== Former teams in the Ron Massey Cup ===
- St Mary's-Penrith Cougars (2003)
- South Sydney Juniors (2003–2004)
- Woy Woy Roosters (2003–2004)
- Ourimbah Magpies (2003–2005)^{1}
- Newtown Jets (2003–2006)
- Seven Hills Demons (2007)
- Belrose Eagles (2005–2008)
- Erina Eagles (2003–2008)
- Shellharbour City Marlins (2007–2008)
- Southern Sydney Sharks (2008)
- WA Reds (2008–2009)
- Chester Hill Rhinos (2007–2009)
- Big Units Rebels (2009)
- Campbelltown Eagles (2008–2010)
- Bankstown Sports (2011)
- Sydney Bulls (2003–2011)^{2, 3}
- St Johns Eagles (2011–2012)^{4}
- Burwood North-Ryde United (2012–2014)
- The Entrance Tigers (2003–2007, 2010–2014)^{5}
- Kingsgrove Colts (2011–2016)
- Auburn Warriors (2012–2017)
- Asquith Magpies (2005–2007. 2013–2016, 2018–2020)
- Guildford Owls (2003, 2013–2020)
- Windsor Wolves (2003–2016, 2020–2021)
- Western Suburbs Magpies (2013–2019, 2021–2022)
- Kaiviti Silktails (2020–2023)
- Cabramatta Two Blues (2004–2021, 2025)^{5}

1. Ourimbah withdrew from the competition midway through the 2005 season.
2. Named Bankstown City Bulls from 2009 to 2010.
3. Sydney Bulls withdrew from the competition midway through the 2011 season.
4. St Johns Eagles joined the competition midway through the 2011 season, replacing the Sydney Bulls.
5. Known internally as the Mungoball Tigers.
6. Cabramatta withdrew from the competition after two rounds.

== History ==
The Ron Massey Cup is the latest in a succession of Sydney-based second tier, semi-professional Rugby League competitions.

=== Inter-District/Second Division (1963–1973) ===
The second tier senior Rugby League competition in Sydney was the Inter-District Competition established in 1963 by the NSWRL. It was renamed the Second Division in 1964. Like succeeding competitions the Second Division had a high turnover of participating clubs. The 'promotion' of two of the two biggest clubs Penrith Panthers (1966 champions) and Cronulla-Sutherland Sharks, at the conclusion of the 1966 season did not help the long-term stability of the competition.

During this period Wentworthville ("The Magpies") was the most successful club, competing in every grand final of the Second Division, winning a total of 8 premierships (including 5 in a row between 1967 and 1971). Due to their domination of the competition 'Wenty' was widely considered the best candidate for promotion to the NSWRL Premiership when two positions were made available for the 1967 competition. Due to their proximity to Parramatta, where a Premiership club was established in 1947, the Magpies were overlooked.

| Year | Premiers | Score | Runners-up | Winning Coach | Referee |
|---|---|---|---|---|---|
| 1963 | Kingsford | 9 – 7 | Cronulla-Caringbah Sharks | | Col Pearce |
| 1964 | Wentworthville Magpies | 20 – 5 | Ryde-Eastwood Hawks | Lewis Jones | Jack Harris |
| 1965 | Wentworthville Magpies | 31 – 3 | Penrith Panthers | Lewis Jones | Keith Holman |
| 1966 | Penrith Panthers | 9 – 7 | Wentworthville Magpies | Leo Trevena | Lin Turner |
| 1967 | Wentworthville Magpies | 25 – 6 | Ryde-Eastwood Hawks | | John Farrelly |
| 1968 | Wentworthville Magpies | 17 – 5 | Arncliffe Scots | Lewis Jones | John Farrelly |
| 1969 | Wentworthville Magpies | 20 – 2 | Sydney University | Lewis Jones | Les Samuelson |
| 1970 | Wentworthville Magpies | 15 – 5 | Blacktown Workers | Lewis Jones | Laurie Bruyeres |
| 1971 | Wentworthville Magpies | 21 – 15 | Sydney University | Lewis Jones | Keith Page |
| 1972 | Ryde-Eastwood Hawks | 18 – 14 | Wentworthville Magpies | Laurie Fagan | Keith Page |
| 1973 | Wentworthville Magpies | 12 – 8 | Ryde-Eastwood Hawks | D. Rayner | Don Macdonald |

=== The Metropolitan League (1974–1976) ===
The Second Division was reorganised in 1974 and renamed the Metropolitan League. It was dominated by the Ryde-Eastwood club. In the absence of Wentworthville, who competed in the Illawarra Rugby League competition, Ryde-Eastwood won all three Metropolitan League titles. The Metropolitan League was dismantled in 1976 and with it the idea of a second-tier competition.

| Year | Premiers | Score | Runners-up | Winning Coach | Referee |
|---|---|---|---|---|---|
| 1974 | Ryde-Eastwood Hawks | 37 – 9 | St Marys Saints | Laurie Fagan | D. Macdonald |
| 1975 | Ryde-Eastwood Hawks | 18 – 14 | Windsor Wolves | Laurie Fagan | |
| 1976 | Ryde-Eastwood Hawks | 10 – 8 | University of NSW | | |

=== The Metropolitan Cup (1990–2002) ===
The concept of the second-tier competition was resurrected in 1990 with the establishment of the Metropolitan Cup. Many teams that were involved in the former Second Division and Metropolitan League were included in the new competition, including Ryde-Eastwood and Wentworthville. Other teams in the new competition included the Guildford Owls, Mount Pritchard, Bankstown Greyhounds, Western Suburbs Magpies and the Hills District Bulls. The Newtown Jets, who had been exiled from the New South Wales Rugby League premiership at the close of the 1983 season, were also granted admission into the competition in 1991 and became a successful club in their second life, winning 4 premierships (including 3 in a row between 1995 and 1997). Other teams who competed in the cup over the years included St. Marys Saints, West Wollongong Red Devils, Moorebank Rams (Bulldogs), UTS Roosters (1996), Windsor Wolves, Cabramatta Blues, Sydney Bulls and the Kellyville Bushrangers

The final Metropolitan Cup was contested in 2002 and was won by a newly formed club, the Sydney Bulls, defeating Ryde-Eastwood in the last grand final of the Metropolitan Cup.

| Year | Premiers | Score | Runners up | Winning Coach | Referee |
|---|---|---|---|---|---|
| 1990 | Ryde-Eastwood Hawks | 19 – 6 | Hills District Bulls | Ken Wilson | Peter Filmer |
| 1991 | Guildford Owls | 21 – 6 | Ryde-Eastwood Hawks | Greg Pierce | Chris Ward |
| 1992 | Newtown Jets | 30 – 18 | Wentworthville Magpies | B Wakefield | |
| 1993 | St Marys Saints | 30 – 10 | Ryde-Eastwood Hawks | Mark O'Reilly | Kelvin Jeffes |
| 1994 | St Marys Saints | 32 – 14 | Hills District Bulls | Mark O'Reilly | Graeme West |
| 1995 | Newtown Jets | 26 – 8 | Wentworthville Magpies | Col Murphy | Matt Hewitt |
| 1996 | Newtown Jets | 28 – 16 | Ryde-Eastwood Hawks | Col Murphy | David Jay |
| 1997 | Newtown Jets | 18 – 8 | Guildford Owls | Col Murphy | |
| 1998 | Wentworthville Magpies | 18 – 12 | Kellyville | Ian McCann | |
| 1999 | Wentworthville Magpies | 30 – 22 | Ryde-Eastwood Hawks | Ian McCann | |
| 2000 | Ryde-Eastwood Hawks | 24 – 10 | St Marys Saints | Dave Nugent | |
| 2001 | St Marys Saints | 20 – 16 | Sydney Bulls | Tim O'Brien | Kelvin Jeffes |
| 2002 | Sydney Bulls | 44 – 12 | Ryde-Eastwood Hawks | Steve Ghosn | Rod Lawrence |

=== Jim Beam Cup (2003–2008) ===
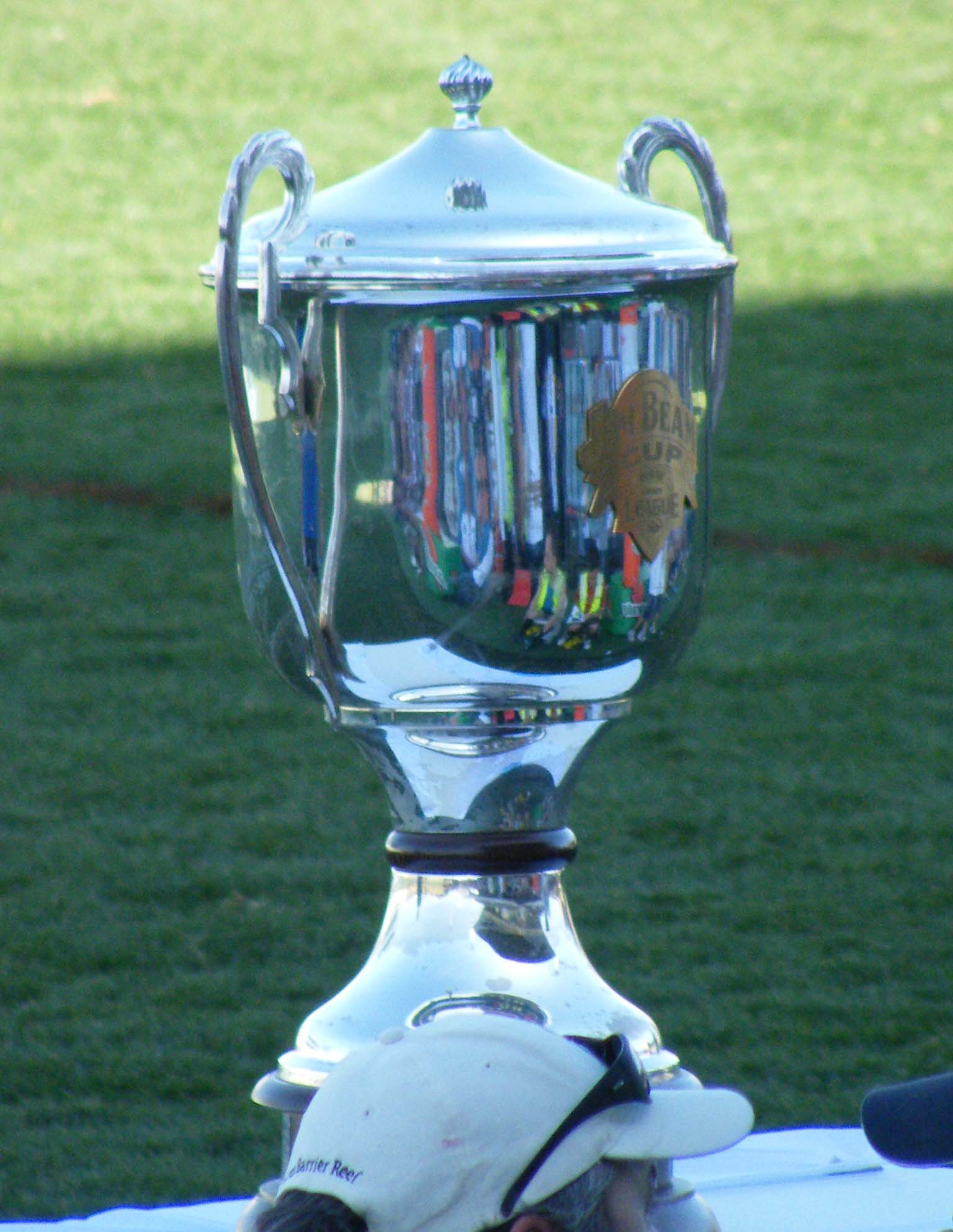
The Jim Beam Cup, 2008

The Jim Beam Cup was established in 2003 as part of another overall restructure of the NSWRL competitions operating in the levels below the NRL. The Jim Beam Cup was intended to lay the foundations of a semi-professional 'State League' competition (similar to the Queensland Cup) and included four non-Sydney teams from the Central Coast (Erina Eagles, The Entrance Tigers, Ourimbah Magpies, and Woy Woy Roosters.) With the inclusion of these clubs (who field teams in the Central Coast Division of the CRL) the Jim Beam Cup became a cooperative effort between the NSWRL and the CRL.

Radio coverage was heard on Hawkesbury Radio 89.9FM with Peter Jolly and Shane Skeen.

| Year | Premiers | Score | Runners-up | Winning Coach | Referee |
|---|---|---|---|---|---|
| 2003 | The Entrance Tigers | 14 – 10 | Wentworthville Magpies | Matt Parish | Jason Robinson |
| 2004 | Sydney Bulls | 22 – 16 | The Entrance Tigers | Steve Ghosn | Rod Lawrence |
| 2005 | Windsor Wolves | 23 – 18 | Sydney Bulls | Steve Ghosn | Jared Maxwell |
| 2006 | Sydney Bulls | 56 – 22 | Newtown Jets | David Bayssari | Alan Shortall |
| 2007 | The Entrance Tigers | 30 – 20 | Sydney Bulls | Jamy Forbes | Chris James |
| 2008 | Windsor Wolves | 36 – 16 | Sydney Bulls | Trent Rosa | Adam Gee |

=== Bundaberg Red Cup (2009–2012) ===
The 2009 Grand Final was a closely fought battle between Minor Premiers Wentworthville Magpies and Cabramatta Two Blues, with Wentworthville coming out victorious by 24–20 in the game at Leichhardt Oval.

| Year | Premiers | Score | Runners-up | Winning Coach | Referee |
|---|---|---|---|---|---|
| 2009 | Wentworthville Magpies | 24 – 10 | Cabramatta Two Blues | Brett Cook | Chris Sutton |
| 2010 | Wentworthville Magpies | 38 – 28 | Bankstown City Bulls | Brett Cook | Jon Stone |
| 2011 | Cabramatta Two Blues | 28 – 20 | Mount Pritchard Mounties | Corey Ruttle | Robert Bowen |
| 2012 | Wentworthville Magpies | 16 – 14 | The Entrance Tigers | Alex Chan | Phil Henderson |

=== Ron Massey Cup (2013–) ===
During the 2012/13 offseason it was announced that Bundaberg Rum had withdrawn their sponsorship, and the competition would be renamed as the Ron Massey Cup, after the great Parramatta assistant coach.

| Year | Premiers | Score | Runners-up | Minor Premiers | Wooden Spoon | Winning Coach | Referee |
|---|---|---|---|---|---|---|---|
| 2013 | Wentworthville Magpies | 32 – 18 | Mount Pritchard Mounties | | | Alex Chan | Adam Cassidy |
| 2014 | The Entrance Tigers | 22 – 18 | Mount Pritchard Mounties | Wentworthville Magpies | Burwood North Ryde United | Jamy Forbes | Adam Cassidy |
| 2015 | Mount Pritchard Mounties | 30 – 14 | Asquith Magpies | Mount Pritchard Mounties | Kingsgrove Colts | Chris Hutchinson | Daniel Olford |
| 2016 | Mount Pritchard Mounties | 36 – 16 | St Marys Saints | Mount Pritchard Mounties | Kingsgrove Colts | Mark Speechley | Ryan Jackson |
| 2017 | Wentworthville Magpies | 38 – 4 | Auburn Warriors | St Marys Saints | Western Suburbs Magpies | Chris Yates | Ryan Jackson |
| 2018 | Wentworthville Magpies | 38 – 4 | St Marys Saints | Wentworthville Magpies | Penrith Brothers | Brett Cook | Darian Furner |
| 2019 | Wentworthville Magpies | 32 – 14 | St Marys Saints | Wentworthville Magpies | Penrith Brothers | Brett Cook | Kieron Irons |
| 2020 | Season was suspended after 1 round due to lockdowns enacted to mitigate risks of the COVID-19 pandemic. | | | | | | |
| 2021 | Season was suspended after 16 rounds due to lockdowns enacted to mitigate risks of the COVID-19 pandemic. | | | | | | |
| 2022 | Hills District Bulls | 18 – 12 | Glebe Dirty Reds | Hills District Bulls | Western Suburbs Magpies | Mick Withers | Damian Brady |
| 2023 | St Marys Saints | 40 – 12 | Wentworthville Magpies | St Marys Saints | Canterbury-Bankstown Bulldogs | Darren Baker | Clayton Wills |
| 2024 | Glebe Dirty Reds | 19 – 6 | Wentworthville Magpies | St Marys Saints | Hills District Bulls | Craig Garvey | Aaron Zammit |
| 2025 | St Marys Saints | 34 – 22 | Wentworthville Magpies | St Marys Saints | Blacktown Workers | Darren Baker | Mitchell Currie |
| 2026 | St Marys Saints | 18 – 16 | Ryde-Eastwood Hawks | Ryde-Eastwood Hawks | Manly Leagues | Glenn Jones | Micheal Ford |

== Premiership Tally ==
| No. | Club | Premierships |
|---|---|---|
| 1 | **Wentworthville Magpies** | **17** (1964, 1965, 1967, 1968, 1969, 1970, 1971, 1973, 1998, 1999, 2009, 2010, 2012, 2013, 2017, 2018, 2019) |
| 2 | **Ryde-Eastwood Hawks** | **6** (1972, 1974, 1975, 1976, 1990, 2000) |
| 3 | **St Marys Saints** | **6** (1993, 1994, 2001, 2023, 2025, **2026**) |
| 4 | Newtown Jets | **4** (1992, 1995, 1996, 1997) |
| 5 | The Entrance Tigers | **3** (2003, 2007, 2014) |
| 6 | Sydney Bulls | **3** (2002, 2004, 2006) |
| 7 | **Mount Pritchard Mounties** | **2** (2015, 2016) |
| 8 | Windsor Wolves | **2** (2005, 2008) |
| 9 | Cabramatta Two Blues | **1** (2011) |
| 10 | Guildford Owls | **1** (1991) |
| 11 | Penrith Panthers | **1** (1966) |
| 12 | Kingsford | **1** (1963) |
| 13 | **Hills District Bulls** | **1** (2022) |
| 14 | **Glebe Dirty Reds** | **1** (2024) |

Bold means the team is still currently playing in the competition.

== Timeline of Teams ==
The following timeline displays the participation of clubs in the Ron Massey Cup and its most recent predecessors, The Metropolitan Cup, the Jim Beam and Bundaberg Red Cups. The competitions had Top 4 final series from 1990 to 2002, Top 5 from 2003 to 2012, and Top 8 from 2013 to 2019. Three teams from the cancelled 2020 Ron Massey Cup participated in the 2020 President's Cup, two making the four team final series.

Since its establishment in 2003 the competition has both expanded and contracted in terms of numbers of sides competing. Aside from the original expansion of the Sydney-based competition into the Central Coast, the Bundaberg Red Cup has continued to expand throughout Sydney, moving away from its Western Sydney base in 2005 with the inclusion of two Northern Sydney sides: the Asquith Magpies and Belrose Eagles.

=== 2000s ===
2003
2003 saw the inauguration of the new Jim Beam Cup. It featured eight teams from Sydney and four from the Central Coast.

- Erina Eagles
- Guildford Owls
- Newtown Jets
- Ourimbah Magpies
- Ryde-Eastwood Hawks
- St Mary's-Penrith Cougars
- South Sydney Juniors
- Sydney Bulls
- The Entrance Tigers
- Wentworthville Magpies
- Windsor Wolves
- Woy Woy Roosters

2004
The St Mary's-Penrith Cougars left to focus on their NSW Premier League side, and were replaced by the Cabramatta Two Blues.

- Cabramatta Two Blues
- Erina Eagles
- Guildford Owls
- Newtown Jets
- Ourimbah Magpies
- Ryde-Eastwood Hawks
- South Sydney Juniors
- Sydney Bulls
- The Entrance Tigers
- Wentworthville Magpies
- Windsor Wolves
- Woy Woy Roosters

2005

- Asquith Magpies
- Belrose Eagles
- Cabramatta Two Blues
- Erina Eagles
- Newtown Jets
- Ourimbah Magpies (failed to complete the season)
- Sydney Bulls
- The Entrance Tigers
- Wentworthville Magpies
- Windsor Wolves
- Woy Woy Roosters

2006
The Woy Woy Roosters withdrew.

- Asquith Magpies
- Belrose Eagles
- Cabramatta Two Blues
- Erina Eagles
- Newtown Jets
- Sydney Bulls
- The Entrance Tigers
- Wentworthville Magpies
- Windsor Wolves

2007
In 2007, 12 clubs competed for the Jim Beam Cup. New clubs Shellharbour, Chester Hill, Seven Hills and Mount Pritchard competed for the first time. The Newtown Jets dropped out of the competition to concentrate on their club's 2007 NSWRL Premier League campaign.

- Asquith Magpies
- Belrose Eagles
- Cabramatta Two Blues
- Chester Hill Rhinos
- Erina Eagles
- Mount Pritchard Mounties
- Seven Hills Demons
- Shellharbour City Marlins
- Sydney Bulls
- The Entrance Tigers
- Wentworthville Magpies
- Windsor Wolves

In terms of geographical spread four clubs were based in the Parramatta District (Wentworthville, Seven Hills, Cabramatta and Mount Pritchard), two on the Central Coast of NSW (Erina and The Entrance) and Canterbury-Bankstown (Chester Hill and Sydney Bulls) and one each in Penrith (Windsor Wolves), Manly-Warringah (Belrose), Illawarra (Shellharbour) and North Sydney (Asquith).

2008
In 2008, for the first time, an interstate team entered the competition, a Western Australia Rugby League representative side known as the WA Reds, with a view to developing the game in the state in order to secure a future NRL franchise in 2011–2012. The Cronulla Sutherland Sharks and the Campbelltown Eagles also joined the competition. The Seven Hills Demons announced that they would not field a team in the Jim Beam Cup in Season 2008. The Entrance Tigers, who had claimed the 2007 title, unfortunately pulled out of the Jim Beam Cup due to the restrictions placed on gambling and smoking in clubs and pubs. The Asquith Magpies also withdrew from the competition.

- Belrose Eagles
- Cabramatta Two Blues
- Campbelltown Eagles
- Chester Hill Rhinos
- Erina Eagles
- Mount Pritchard Mounties
- Shellharbour City Marlins
- Southern Sharks
- Sydney Bulls
- WA Reds
- Wentworthville Magpies
- Windsor Wolves

2009

- Bankstown City Bulls
- Cabramatta Two Blues
- Campbelltown Eagles
- Chester Hill Rhinos
- Mount Pritchard Mounties
- Penrith Brothers
- Southern Districts Rebels
- WA Reds
- Wentworthville Magpies
- Windsor Wolves

=== 2010s ===
2010

- Bankstown City Bulls
- Cabramatta Two Blues
- Campbelltown Eagles
- Mount Pritchard Mounties
- Penrith Brothers
- The Entrance Tigers
- Wentworthville Magpies
- Windsor Wolves

2011
In 2011, the Kingsgrove Colts joined the competition, based in the St George catchment area. As of Round 6, the Sydney Bulls left the competition due to financial difficulties.

- Bankstown Sports
- Cabramatta Two Blues
- Kingsgrove Colts
- Mount Pritchard Mounties
- Sydney Bulls (failed to complete the season)
- The Entrance Tigers
- Wentworthville Magpies
- Windsor Wolves

2012

- Auburn Warriors
- Blacktown Workers
- Burwood North Ryde
- Cabramatta Two Blues
- Kingsgrove Colts
- Mount Pritchard Mounties
- The Entrance Tigers
- Wentworthville Magpies
- Windsor Wolves

2013

- Asquith Magpies
- Auburn Warriors
- Blacktown Workers
- Burwood North Ryde
- Cabramatta Two Blues
- Kingsgrove Colts
- Mount Pritchard Mounties
- The Entrance Tigers
- Wentworthville Magpies
- Western Suburbs Magpies
- Windsor Wolves

The Asquith Magpies returned, replacing the St Johns Eagles. The Guildford Owls made their return, and the Western Suburbs Magpies made their return following the merger of the NSW Cup entities.

2014

- Asquith Magpies
- Auburn Warriors
- Blacktown Workers
- Burwood North Ryde
- Cabramatta Two Blues
- Guildford Owls
- Kingsgrove Colts
- Mount Pritchard Mounties
- The Entrance Tigers
- Wentworthville Magpies
- Western Suburbs Magpies
- Windsor Wolves

The same twelve teams as in 2013 participated. The regular season was held over 22 rounds without byes.

2015

- Asquith Magpies
- Auburn Warriors
- Blacktown Workers
- Burwood North Ryde
- Cabramatta Two Blues
- Guildford Owls
- Kingsgrove Colts
- Mount Pritchard Mounties
- Wentworthville Magpies
- Western Suburbs Magpies
- Windsor Wolves

The reigning premiers, The Entrance Tigers withdrew. The eleven teams competed in a 22-round regular season. Each team played each of their ten opponents twice, with two byes. Western Suburbs, Cabramatta and Kingsgrove missed the eight-team finals series.

2016

- Asquith Magpies
- Auburn Warriors
- Blacktown Workers
- Cabramatta Two Blues
- Concord-Burwood United Wolves
- Guildford Owls
- Hills District Bulls
- Kingsgrove Colts
- Mount Pritchard Mounties
- St Marys Saints
- Wentworthville Magpies
- Western Suburbs Magpies
- Windsor Wolves

The Hills District Bulls and St Marys Saints joined the competition. The thirteen teams competed in a 22-round regular season. Each team played seven of their opponents twice, and six opponents once, with two byes.

2017

- Auburn Warriors
- Blacktown Workers Sea Eagles
- Cabramatta Two Blues
- Concord-Burwood-Glebe Wolves
- Guildford Owls
- Hills District Bulls
- Mounties
- St Marys Saints
- Wentworthville
- Western Suburbs

The Asquith Magpies, Kingsgrove Colts, and Windsor Wolves withdrew. Glebe Dirty Reds entered into a joint venture with the Concord-Burwood Wolves. The ten teams each played 18 matches over 25 rounds with seven byes. Each team played each of their opponents twice. Byes were scheduled throughout the season. On only two weekends (Rounds 8 and 22) did all ten teams play.

2018

- Asquith Magpies
- Blacktown Workers Sea Eagles
- Brothers Penrith
- Cabramatta Two Blues
- Glebe Dirty Reds
- Guildford Owls
- Hills District Bulls
- Mounties
- St Marys
- Wentworthville
- Western Suburbs

Auburn did not field a team in the competition after being liquidated. The Asquith Magpies and Brothers Penrith returned after gaps of one and seven seasons, respectively. Despite the increase of teams to eleven, the number of rounds was reduced to twenty. Each team played eight of their opponents twice, and two opponents just once, for a total of 18 matches with two byes.

2019

- Asquith Magpies
- Blacktown Workers Sea Eagles
- Brothers Penrith
- Cabramatta Two Blues
- Glebe Dirty Reds
- Guildford Owls
- Hills District Bulls
- Mount Pritchard Mounties
- St Marys Saints
- Wentworthville Magpies
- Western Suburbs Magpies

The same eleven teams as in 2018 participated. The fixtures list was lengthened to 20 matches over 24 rounds. Each team played each of their opponents twice, with four byes.

=== 2020s ===
2020
For 2020 the 11 clubs in the list immediately below were included in the competition. After the first round on 14 & 15 March, the Ron Massey Cup was suspended and subsequently cancelled due to the COVID-19 pandemic in Australia. In that single, first round the winning teams were the Kaiviti Silktails (40-16 on their debut), Concord-Burwood-Glebe Wolves (12-4), Wentworthville (18-14), St Marys (44-32) and Blacktown Workers (30-4). Guildford had the bye.

The NSWRL subsequently arranged two men's competitions, a President's Cup and a reconfigured Sydney Shield. Hills District Bulls and Wentworthville entered teams in both competitions. Glebe-Burwood Wolves fielded a team in the President's Cup.

The President's Cup comprised four teams from within the Sydney metropolitan area and five teams from other areas of the state. The Sydney teams were Glebe-Burwood Wolves (finished as runners-up), North Sydney Bears (semi-finalist), Hills District Bulls (semi-finalist) and Wentworthville Magpies (8th). The teams from regions were Maitland Pickers (Premiers) from the Hunter Valley; Thirroul Butchers (5th) and Western Suburbs Red Devils (6th) from the Illawarra, Dubbo CYMS (7th) and a Western Rams representative team (9th). The Western Rams played their home games in Forbes, Orange, Mudgee and Bathurst.

On 28 September 2020, the NSWRL announced their intention to expand, from the 2021 season, the Ron Massey Cup to become a statewide competition. The statement also affirmed that Kaiviti Silktails from Fiji would be part of that competition.

- Asquith Magpies
- Blacktown Workers Sea Eagles
- Cabramatta Two Blues
- Glebe-Concord Wolves
- Guildford Owls
- Hills District Bulls
- Kaiviti Silktails
- Mount Pritchard Mounties
- St Marys Saints
- Wentworthville Magpies
- Windsor Wolves

Due to the COVID-19 pandemic, the 2020 Ron Massey Cup was cancelled after one round of matches.

2021

- Blacktown Workers Sea Eagles
- Cabramatta Two Blues
- Glebe Dirty Reds
- Hills District Bulls
- Kaiviti Silktails
- Mounties
- Ryde-Eastwood Hawks
- St Mary's
- Wentworthville
- Western Suburbs
- Windsor Wolves

Due to the COVID-19 pandemic, the 2021 Ron Massey Cup was cancelled after 15 rounds.

2022

- Blacktown Workers Sea Eagles
- Glebe Dirty Reds
- Hills Bulls
- Kaiviti Silktails
- Mounties
- Ryde-Eastwood Hawks
- St Marys
- Wentworthville
- Western Suburbs

The Cabramatta Two Blues and Windsor Wolves dropped out. A nine-team competition was played over 18 rounds with each team playing each of their eight opponents twice and having two byes.

2023

- Brothers Penrith
- Canterbury-Bankstown Bulldogs
- Glebe Dirty Reds
- Hills Bulls
- Kaiviti Silktails
- Mounties
- Ryde-Eastwood Hawks
- St Marys
- Wentworthville

The Blacktown Workers Sea Eagles and Western Suburbs dropped out, although both clubs retained teams in the higher tier NSW Cup. The Canterbury-Bankstown Bulldogs entered a team as an extension of their player pathways. Brothers Penrith returned. A nine-team competition was played over 18 rounds with each team playing each of their eight opponents twice and having two byes.

2024

- Brothers Penrith
- Canterbury-Bankstown Bulldogs
- Glebe Dirty Reds
- Hills Bulls
- Mounties
- Ryde-Eastwood Hawks
- St Marys
- Wentworthville

The Kaiviti Silktails moved from the open-age Ron Massey Cup to the Jersey Flegg Cup for players under 19 years. An eight-team competition was played over 20 rounds. Each team played 16 matches in the regular season, and were scheduled to have two byes, despite the even number of teams.

2025

- Blacktown Workers
- Brothers Penrith
- Cabramatta Two Blues (withdrew after two rounds)
- Canterbury-Bankstown Bulldogs
- Glebe Dirty Reds
- Hills Bulls
- Mounties
- Ryde-Eastwood Hawks
- St Marys
- Wentworthville

The Blacktown Workers re-entered the competition following the dissolution of their pathways joint-venture with the Manly-Warringah Sea Eagles. Cabramatta Two Blues also returned to the competition, but they withdrew after two matches - both of which they had won - due to financial reasons. The teams Cabramatta had beaten, Mounties and Canterbury were subsequently deemed to have had a bye and were awarded two points for those rounds. The resultant nine-team competition was played over 20 rounds, with each team playing each of their eight opponents twice, and having four byes.

== See also ==
- Canterbury Cup NSW
- Sydney Shield
- Presidents Cup
- NSW Challenge Cup
- Rugby League Competitions in Australia

== Sources ==
- Big League
- Daily Telegraph (Australia)
- E.E. Christensen's Official Rugby League Yearbook
- History of the Hawks 1963–2004 : a history of Ryde-Eastwood Leagues Club and Ryde-Eastwood District Rugby League Football Club Inc. (2004), Chris Karas
- Never a backward step: the story of St Mary's Rugby League Club (2008), Alan Whiticker.
- NSWRL Annual Reports
- Rugby League News (available on Trove)
- Rugby League Week
- St George & Sutherland Leader
- Sydney Morning Herald

All of the above are available at the State Library of NSW, although some collections are incomplete.

- NSWRL News, 2016 Grand Final edition.
