= Kaiviti Silktails =

Fijian semi-pro rugby league club, competing in Australia

Club information
- Full name: Kaiviti Silktails Rugby league Football Club
- Short name: Kaiviti, The Silktails
- Colours: Sky Blue; Navy Blue
- Founded: 2019; 7 years ago
- Website: https://silktails.com/

Current details
- Ground: Churchill Park (10,000)
- Chairman: Petero Civoniceva
- Coach: Wes Naiqama
- Captain: Sunia Naruma
- Competition: Jersey Flegg Cup

The Kaiviti Silktails are a semi-professional rugby league football club from Fiji competing in the NSWRL's Jersey Flegg Cup.

From 2020 to 2023, they competed in the Ron Massey Cup.

== History ==
The NSWRL had first endorsed a bid team from Fiji led by Petero Civoniceva early in 2014 to have a team compete in the 2016 NSW Cup competition. The bid received endorsement from the Fiji National Rugby League in 2018. In June 2019, it was announced that the Kaiviti Silktails would enter the Ron Massey Cup in 2020, with promotion to the New South Wales Cup in 2021. Brandon Costin, coach of the Fijian national team, was announced as head coach.

The Silktails won their opening match of the 2020 season 40–16 against the Windsor Wolves in Lautoka. The season was subsequently cancelled due to the COVID-19 pandemic. Wes Naiqama was named head coach in June 2020.

The Silktails remained in the Ron Massey Cup in 2021, remaining in Australia for the duration of the season due to the COVID-19 pandemic, and playing their home matches at Mascot Oval. During their round 1 bye, the team played a trial match against the Mascot Jets, winning 46–16. Their round 2 match against the Blacktown Workers Sea Eagles was postponed due to inclement weather.

In 2022, the Silktails became a predominantly under-23 side. In December 2023, it was announced that Silktails would become an under-21 side and join the Jersey Flegg Cup.

== Stadium ==
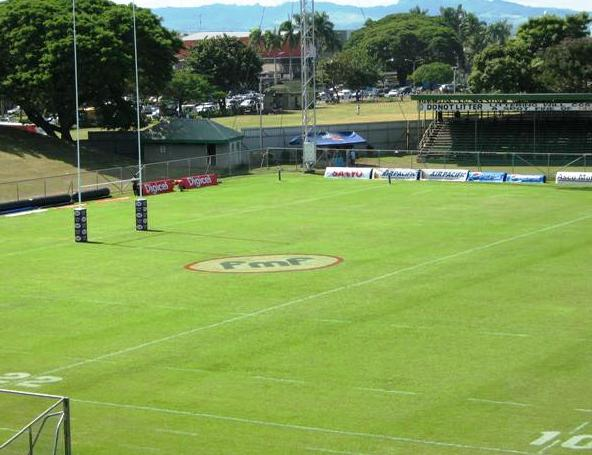
The town-end view of Churchill Park

The Silktails were scheduled to play all 10 of their home matches in 2020 at Churchill Park, Lautoka. In 2021, the team played all of their home matches at Mascot Oval, Sydney.

== Players ==
=== Current squad ===
Squad for season 2023.

- 1. Ratu Jilivecevece (Fullback)
- 2. Timoci Bola (Wing)
- 3. Osea Natoga (Centre)
- 4. Filimoni Paul (Centre)
- 5. Paula Valisoliso (Wing)
- 6. Mosese Qionimacawa (Five-eighth)
- 7. Sunia Naruma (Halfback)
- 8. Apakuki Tavodi (Prop) (c)
- 9. Penaia Leveleve (Hooker)
- 10. Meli Nasau (Prop)
- 11. Inoke Vasuturaga (Second-row)
- 12. Manasa Kalou (Second-row)
- 13. Ponipate Komai (Lock)
- 14. Simone Cakauniqio (Second-row)
- 15. Samuela Yalisaya (Second-row)
- 16. Timoci Bola
- 17. Manoa Satala
- 18. Watasoni Waqanisaravi
- 19. Manoa Vilikesa
- 20. Manueli Levaqai
- 21. Sirilo Lovokuro
- 22. Kilione Cagilevu
- 23. Rusiate Baleitamavua
- 24. Jonathan Roseman
- 25. Iobe Taukeisalili
- 26. Viliame Tutuvili
- 27. Sitiveni Ravono
- 28. Mosese Qionimacawa.

== See also ==
- Rugby league in Fiji
- Fiji national rugby league team
