= Chester Hill Rhinos =

Defunct Australian rugby league club

Club information
- Full name: Chester Hill Rhinos Rugby League Football Club
- Colours: Blue; Gold
- Founded: 2007; 19 years ago
- Exited: 2009; 17 years ago

Former details
- Ground: Terry Lamb Complex
- Competition: New South Wales Cup, Ron Massey Cup

The Chester Hill Rhinos were a rugby league team based in the suburb of Chester Hill in Sydney's south-west. From 2007 to 2009 the club fielded a side in the semi-professional NSWRL Jim Beam Cup competition in New South Wales, Australia. They folded in 2009. Their colours were blue, gold and white - they were directly linked with the clubs junior club the Chester Hill Hornets.

== History ==
Chester Hill was admitted to the NSWRL Jim Beam Cup for the 2007 season and adopted the Rhino moniker for the side. They folded the team in 2009.

== Notable Juniors ==
Notable First Grade Players that have played at Chester Hill Rhinos include:

- Corey Payne (2005-12 St George Illawarra, Wests Tigers & Canterbury Bulldogs).
