= Erina Eagles =

Australian rugby league club, based on the Central Coast, NSW

Erina Eagles RLFC

Club information
- Full name: Erina Eagles Rugby League Football Club
- Colours: Blue; White; Red
- Founded: 1949; 77 years ago
- Website: www.erinaleagues.com.au

Current details
- Ground: Erina Oval, Erina
- Competition: Central Coast Division of Country Rugby League

Records
- Premierships: 5 (1977, 1981, 1988, 1991, 2024)
- Runners-up: 14 (1951, 1953, 1957, 1959, 1960, 1966, 1976, 1990, 1992, 1998, 2003, 2013, 2022, 2023)
- Minor premierships: 5 (1981, 1990, 1991, 2022, 2024)

The Erina Eagles are an Australian rugby league football club based in the suburb of Erina on the Central Coast of NSW. They have numerous teams competing in competitions run by the Central Coast Division of Country Rugby League, from U/7s through to First Grade. The Eagles' current home ground is Erina Oval and their traditional colours are red, white and blue.

The Eagles have won the Central Coast first grade premiership on five occasions, in 1977, 1981, 1988, 1991 and 2024.

== Notable Juniors ==
Notable First Grade Players that have played at Erina Eagles include:

- Perry Haddock (1981-89 Cronulla Sharks, St. George Dragons and the Illawarra Steelers)
- Greg Clements (1983-89 Penrith Panthers)
- Grant Wooden (2002 Northern Eagles), (2003 Manly Sea Eagles)
- Ian Henderson (2003-16 New Zealand Warriors, Sydney, Parramatta, Bradford and the Catalans Dragons)
- Kevin Henderson (2004-11 Newcastle Knights and the Wakefield Trinity Wildcats)
- Rhys Curran (2015-19 Toulouse Olympique)
- Matt Ikuvalu (2018-present Sydney Roosters)
- Phoenix Crossland (2019-present Newcastle Knights)

== Background ==
Prior to the formation of the current club in 1949, Erina teams competed in local rugby league competitions in 1915, from 1919 to 1926, and again from 1930 to 1934. That club were runner's up in 1915. Erina won an end of season knock-out competition in 1920. In 1923 and 1924, Erina won premierships in both grades, first and second. In the knock-out competition of those years, Erina won second grade in 1923 and both grades in 1924. A meeting of the club in August 1934 expressed disappointment at the outcome of protests and contemplated disbanding. Erina did not compete in the 1935 competition.

== Honours and records (not up-to date)* ==
=== Team ===
- Premierships (5): 1977, 1981, 1988, 1991, 2024.
- Runners-up (14): 1951, 1953, 1957, 1959, 1960, 1966, 1976, 1990, 1992, 1998, 2003, 2013, 2022, 2023.
- Second / B / Reserve Grade (10): 1960, 1962, 1963, 1980, 1981, 1982, 1983, 1990, 1993, 1998.
- Third Grade (2): 1973, 1975.
- Open Age (2): 2010, 2017.
- C Grade (1): 1955.
- Under 19 (3): 1979, 2004, 2007.
- Under 18 (4): 1974, 1976, 1977, 1991.
- Under 17 (2): 1979, 1980.
- Under 16 (4): 1978, 1990, 2003, 2016.
- Under 16 Division 2 (1): 2011.
- Ladies League Tag (1): 2016.
- *first grade is up-to date as of Jan 2025

== Team numbers ==
View source data.

Team numbers obtained and compiled from competition tables and match results published in the newspapers, Central Coast Express, Wyong Shire Advocate and Central Coast Express Advocate. Numbers for 2003 and 2011 taken from copies of the Central Coast Division Junior Rugby League Yearbook of those years, supplied by Toukley Hawks RLFC. Age groups Under 9 and younger not included as team numbers from 1985 to 2011 not known to the author.

== See also ==
- List of NSW Central Coast Rugby League First Grade Premiers
