= The Entrance Tigers =

Australian rugby league club, based at The Entrance, NSW

Club information
- Full name: The Entrance District Rugby League Football Club
- Nickname: The Tigers,
- Colours: Orange; Black; White
- Founded: 1934; 92 years ago Entered Competition 1947; 79 years ago

Current details
- Ground: EDSACC Oval, Bateau Bay
- Competition: Central Coast Rugby League

Records
- Premierships: 18 (CCDRL 1949, 1956, 1957, 1961, 1989, 1993, 1995, 2000, 2003, 2004, 2008, 2009, 2015, 2018, 2019; Jim Beam Cup 2003, 2007; Ron Massey Cup 2014)
- Runners-up: 10 (1948, 1954, 1955, 1958, 1972, 1996, 2001, 2002; Jim Beam Cup 2004; Bundaberg Red Cup 2012)
- Minor premierships: 12 (1956, 1957, 1960, 1989, 1997, 2001, 2002, 2004, 2008, 2009, 2015, 2018; Jim Beam Cup 2003)

The Entrance Tigers are a rugby league club based at The Entrance, New South Wales, Australia.They are competing in the 2026 Denton Engineering Cup & Central Coast Division Rugby League. They have previously competed in the Jim Beam Cup (2003-2007) and Ron Massey Cup (2010-2014). Their jersey is traditionally an all gold jersey with two black 'V's. In recent years they have included white in their jersey.

== History ==
The current club dates its establishment to 1934. The club's official history, A History of The Entrance Rugby League Football Club - From Seagulls to Tigers 1934 to 2012, acknowledges that a football team from the area played matches in the 1920s or early 1930s. A newspaper report of a club meeting in May 1935 confirms this, "It is thought that there is a few shillings still belonging to the old Entrance Football Club, so negotiations are being made to have this transferred to the present club's list of funds."

The Entrance did not enter the local league competitions in the 1920s or 1930s, and played only social or Challenge Cup matches. The format of the latter involved a club hosting visiting teams from Sydney or other country areas. The visiting side that was the best performed against the hosts was invited back at the end of the season to play a Grand Final. The local competitions experienced a decline in interest in the mid-thirties, and from 1937 the other clubs on the Central Coast played only in Challenge Cup matches. Matches continued to be played during the early years on World War Two.

In 1947, The Entrance was a founding member of the Central Coast Rugby League Football Association. The club entered a team in each of the three grade competitions, reaching the final in both lower grades.

In the top grade, The Entrance were runners-up in 1948 and premiers in 1949. Three successive Grand Finals were played against Ourimbah, for a loss (7-15 in 1948), a draw (7-all) and a win (15-11 in the 1949 replay).

Further A Grade or First Grade premierships were won in 1956, 1957, 1961, 1989, 1993, 1995, 2000, 2003, 2004, 2008, 2009, 2015, 2018 and 2019.

The club has had two stints in third tier competitions run by the New South Wales Rugby League, from 2003 to 2007 in the Jim Beam Cup and in its successor, the Ron Massey Cup from 2010 to 2014. The Entrance won those competitions in 2003, 2007 and 2014.

For many years the club’s home ground was Taylor Park at The Entrance, however in 1980 both the Junior and Senior clubs moved to EDSACC Oval South in Bateau Bay, our current home ground.

== Notable Juniors ==
- Ken Hey (1975-84 Western Suburbs Magpies, Parramatta Eels, Penrith Panthers)
- Perry Haddock (1981-89 Cronulla-Sutherland Sharks, St. George Dragons, Illawarra Steelers)
- Max Wilkie (1981-83 North Sydney Bears)
- John Minto (1992-93 South Sydney Rabbitohs)
- Luke Davico (1994-07 Canberra Raiders, Wigan Warriors, Newcastle Knights)
- Ryan O'Hara (2001-12 NSW State of Origin, Canberra Raiders, Wests Tigers, Celtic Crusaders, Hull Kingston Rovers)
- Shaune Corrigan (2009-12 South Sydney Rabbitohs)
- Daniel Harrison (2011-18 Manly Sea Eagles, Parramatta Eels, London Broncos)
- Jake Mamo (2014-23 Newcastle Knights, Huddersfield Giants, Warrington Wolves, Widnes Vikings, Castleford Tigers)
- Daniel Saifiti (2016-26 Fiji national rugby league team, NSW State of Origin, Newcastle Knights, Dolphins)
- Jacob Saifiti (2016- Fiji national rugby league team NSW State of Origin, Newcastle Knights)
- Will Pearsall (2016 Newcastle Knights)
- Liam Knight (2016-25 Manly Sea Eagles, Canberra Raiders, South Sydney Rabbitohs, Canterbury-Bankstown Bulldogs, Hull FC)
- Blake Taaffe (2021- South Sydney Rabbitohs, Canterbury-Bankstown Bulldogs, Castleford Tigers)
- Oryn Keeley (2022- Newcastle Knights, Dolphins, Melbourne Storm)
- Ethan Strange (2023- Australia national rugby league team, NSW State of Origin, Canberra Raiders)
- Riley Jones (2023- Newcastle Knights, Cronulla-Sutherland Sharks)
- Matt French (2024- South Sydney Rabbitohs)
- Harry Hayes (2024- Canterbury-Bankstown Bulldogs)
- Connor Votano (2025- Newcastle Knights)

== Honours and records ==
=== Team ===
- NSWRL 3rd Tier (3): Jim Beam Cup 2003, 2007. Ron Massey Cup 2014.
- Runners-up (2): Jim Beam Cup 2004, Bundaberg Red Cup 2012.
- Premierships (15 CCDRL): 1949, 1956, 1957, 1961, 1989, 1993, 1995, 2000, 2003, 2004, 2008, 2009, 2015, 2018, 2019.
- Runners-up (8 CCDRL): 1948, 1954, 1955, 1958, 1972, 1996, 2001, 2002.
- Second / B / Reserve Grade (12): 1950, 1961, 1991, 1992, 2007, 2011, 2015, 2017, 2018, 2019, 2024, 2025
- Runners-up (12): 1949, 1955, 1959, 1994, 1997, 2001, 2002, 2006, 2008, 2016, 2022, 2023.
- Third Grade (4): 1978, 1997, 1998, 1999.
- Runners-up ( ):
- C Grade (1): 1958.
- Runners-up ( ):
- Under 20 (1): 2009.
- Runners-up ( ):
- NEWRL Under 19 (1): 2026.
- Runners-up ( ):
- Under 19 (3): 1980, 2008, 2010.
- Runners-up (5): 2002, 2003, 2006, 2011, 2014.
- Under 18 (4): 1992, 1994, 1997, 2012.
- Runners-up (2): 1996, 1998.
- D Grade (1): 1955.
- Runners-up ( ):
- Under 17 (2): 2005, 2025.
- Runners-up (8): 2001, 2006, 2007, 2008, 2011, 2013, 2016, 2026.
- Under 16 (9): 1974, 1995, 2000, 2004, 2006, 2015, 2020, 2022, 2024.
- Runners-up (4): 1972, 1984, 1994, 1996.
- Under 16 Division 2 (2): 2004, 2026.
- Runners-up (1): 2003.

== See also ==
- Rugby league in New South Wales
- List of NSW Central Coast Rugby League First Grade Premiers
- http://www.telclub.com.au/

== Sources ==
- A History of The Entrance Rugby League Football Club - From Seagulls to Tigers 1934 to 2012. Bateau Bay, New South Wales: The Entrance Rugby League Football Club. 2013. - A copy of this book is available at the Tuggerah Branch of the Central Coast Council Library.
