= Big League =

Australian sports magazine

- Volume 94. No. 21 of Big League
- Editor: Maria Tsialis
- Categories: Sport, Rugby league
- Frequency: Weekly
- Total circulation (2013): 14,213
- Founded: 1920
- Company: NewsLifeMedia (News Corp Australia)
- Country: Australia
- Based in: Sydney, New South Wales
- Language: English
- Website: Big League
- ISSN: 0311-175X
- OCLC: 220892674

Big League is the official magazine of the National Rugby League. Its predecessor, The Rugby League News, was first published in 1920; in 1974 it was rebranded as Big League. In 2020, due to the effects of the COVID-19 pandemic in Australia and the initial suspension of the 2020 NRL season, production of the magazine was suspended and has not resumed; leaving the game without an official program.

The magazine served as a game-day program, containing team line-ups, stats and feature stories. It went on sale every Thursday at newsagents and exclusively at all active NRL grounds on weekends. Since 2005 it had been published by News Magazines; previously it was published by Text Magazines and Pacific Magazines.

At the time of its cessation of publishing in 2020, the editor of the magazine was Maria Tsialis and the sub-editor was David Piepers. Senior writer was Pamela Whaley and staff writers were Michael Blok and Ben Lonergan. Craig Loughlin-Smith was the art director, who had been with the title since 1999.

Along with the 30 weekly issues of the magazine, Big League also offered the following publications: A5-sized Season Guide, Season Preview, 100-page Grand Final Souvenir, Year in Review issue, State of Origin and Test souvenir programs and the Official Rugby League Annual, compiled by rugby league historian David Middleton.

Shortly after the magazine being withdrawn from publication in May 2020, a free, unofficial weekly magazine and match program was made available online through fan-run rugby league website LeagueUnlimited.com. Named 'The Front Row', the unofficial magazine continues to be published online weekly during the NRL season.

Prior to the 2024 NRL Grand Final, the official NRL site published a video indicating the magazine would be revived for the marquee fixture to celebrate the 50th anniversary of the Big League name, while also indicating the magazine is to be revived in 2025. This revival was confirmed 26th February 2025, when the NRL announced a digital subscription model. Along with a weekly digital magazine, there will be 6 special edition physical copy magazines produced each year for landmark occasions, including the annual Las Vegas season kick off games, the three State Of Origin games each year, the NRL’s annual Magic Round event, and the Grand Final.

== See also ==
- Rugby League Review
- Rugby League Week
