= 2023 New South Wales Rugby League =

The New South Wales Rugby League is administering several competitions during the 2023 rugby league season in Australia.

== State of Origin ==
The senior men's State of Origin series was held on three Wednesdays, with each game three weeks apart, on 31 May, 21 June and 12 July. Queensland won the first two matches and thus the series, before New South Wales won the third match.

In early September, the Brad Fittler Medal for New South Wales' player of the series was awarded to Brian To’o. Liam Martin won the True Blues Award and Cody Walker won The Daily Telegraph People's Choice Award.

The senior women's State of Origin series was held on two Thursdays, on 1 and 22 June. Queensland won the first match in Parramatta, 18–10 before New South Wales responded with an 18–14 win in Townsville. With one win apiece, Queensland won the series on score aggregate 32–28.

Emma Tonegato was named in early September as the NSW Women's Origin Player of the Year. Kezie Apps won the Sky Blues Award.

== Knock-On Effect New South Wales Cup ==
The 2023 season of the Knock-On Effect New South Wales Cup commenced on the weekend of 4–5 March 2023.

Thirteen teams competed in the 2023 NSW Cup.

Colours	Club	Home ground(s)	Head coach
	Blacktown Workers Sea Eagles	4 Pines Park; HE Laybutt Field	Greg Boulous
	Canberra Raiders	GIO Stadium, Raiders Belconnen, Mcdonalds Park	Justin Giteau
	Canterbury-Bankstown Bulldogs	Belmore Oval, Stadium Australia	David Tangata-Toa
	Newcastle Knights	McDonald Jones Stadium, Newcastle Centre of Excellence	Michael Monaghan
	Newtown Jets	Henson Park	George Ndaira
	New Zealand Warriors	Mount Smart Stadium, Navigation Home Stadium, The Trusts Arena, North Harbour Stadium,	Slade Griffin
	North Sydney Bears	North Sydney Oval	Jason Taylor
	Parramatta Eels	Kellyville Oval; CommBank Stadium	Nathan Cayless
	Penrith Panthers	BlueBet Stadium	Ben Harden
	South Sydney Rabbitohs	Stadium Australia, Coogee Oval, Redfern Oval	Joe O’Callaghan
	St. George Illawarra Dragons	WIN Stadium, Netstrata Jubilee Stadium, Ron Costello Oval, Collegians Sporting Complex	Bronx Goodwin
	Sydney Roosters	Wentworth Park, Allianz Stadium, Industree Group Stadium	Anthony Barnes
	Western Suburbs Magpies	Lidcombe Oval, Leichhardt Oval, Campbelltown Sports Stadium	Wayne Lambkin

Draw
The New South Rugby League website maintains the competition Fixtures List (draw) for the New South Wales Cup.
The website, League Unlimited, also maintain a draw for the NSW Cup.

Ladder
The New South Rugby League website maintains the ladder. The website, League Unlimited, also maintain a ladder for the NSW Cup.

Pos	KOE NSW Cup Team	Pld	W	D	L	B	PF	PA	PD	Pts
1	North Sydney Bears	24	16	0	8	2	637	474	163	36
2	South Sydney Rabbitohs	24	15	0	9	2	584	533	51	34
3	New Zealand Warriors	24	14	1	9	2	630	470	160	33
4	Canberra Raiders	24	14	1	9	2	554	476	78	33
5	Blacktown Workers Sea Eagles	24	13	2	9	2	629	524	105	32
6	Newtown Jets	24	13	1	10	2	644	511	133	31
7	Penrith Panthers	24	13	0	11	2	564	482	82	30
8	Canterbury-Bankstown Bulldogs	24	11	3	10	2	569	501	68	29
9	Parramatta Eels	24	11	1	12	2	480	683	-203	27
10	St. George Illawarra Dragons	24	9	1	14	2	572	624	-52	23
11	Western Suburbs Magpies	24	8	2	14	2	508	685	-177	22
12	Newcastle Knights	24	8	0	16	2	516	749	-233	20
13	Sydney Roosters	24	5	0	19	2	492	667	-175	14

Finals series

A Final Series is scheduled for September 2023, following the conclusion of the 26th and last round on Sunday, 27 August 2023.

Qualifying and elimination finals
2	South Sydney	26
3	New Zealand	12
4	Canberra	24
5	Blacktown	22

Semi-finals
1	North Sydney	24
South Sydney	30
New Zealand	49
Canberra	6

Preliminary final
North Sydney	28
New Zealand	24

Grand final
South Sydney	22
North Sydney	18

Player of the Year

On 4 September, Dean Hawkins, the South Sydney halfback, was awarded The Knock-On Effect NSW Cup Player of the Year.

== Presidents Cup ==
The winners of the four conferences are scheduled to meet in a two-week knock-out tournament in September 2023.

Northern Conference	Western Conference	Central Conference	Southern Conference
Denton Engineering Cup	Peter McDonald Premiership	Ron Massey Cup	Mojo Homes Illawarra Cup
Draw	Draw yet to be published	Draw (PRL) Draw (LU)	Draw yet to be published
Central Newcastle Butcher Boys; Cessnock Goannas; Kurri Kurri Bulldogs; Lakes United Seagulls; Macquarie Scorpions; Maitland Pickers; Northern Hawks; South Newcastle Lions; Western Suburbs Rosellas; Wyong Roos; The Entrance Tigers	Group 10: Bathurst Panthers; Bathurst St Patrick's; Lithgow Workmen's Club; Mudgee Dragons; Orange CYMS; Orange Hawks; Group 11: Dubbo CYMS; Dubbo Macquarie Raiders; Forbes Magpies; Nyngan Tigers; Parkes Spacemen; Wellington Cowboys	Blacktown Workers Sea Eagles; Canterbury-Bankstown Bulldogs; Glebe Dirty Reds; Hills District Bulls; Kaiviti Silktails; Mounties; Ryde-Eastwood Hawks; St Marys Saints; Wentworthville Magpies	Collegians Collie Dogs; Corrimal Cougars; Dapto Canaries; De La Salle Caringbah; Thirroul Butchers; Western Suburbs Red Devils
Premiers: Maitland Pickers	Premiers: Dubbo CYMS	Premiers: St Marys Saints	Premiers: Thirroul Butchers

=== Finals ===
Semi-finals
16 September
Maitland (NRL)
Thirroul (IRL)	Forfeit
16 September
St Marys (RMC)
Dubbo CYMS (PMP)	Forfeit

Final
24 September - CommBank Stadium
Maitland (NRL)	32
St Marys (RMC)	10

== Harvey Norman NSW Women's Premiership ==
The 2023 season of the Harvey Norman NSWRL Women's Premiership commenced on the weekend of 4–5 February 2023. Eleven teams competed.

Draw
The New South Wales Rugby League website hosted the official Harvey Norman NSW Women's Premiership draw. The website, League Unlimited, also maintained a draw and ladder.

Ladder

Pos	Open Women's Team	Pld	W	D	L	B	PF	PA	PD	Pts
1	North Sydney Bears	10	8	0	2	1	362	120	242	18
2	Illawarra Steelers	10	7	0	3	1	220	178	42	16
3	Canterbury Bulldogs	10	7	0	3	1	212	177	35	16
4	Mounties	10	6	0	4	1	254	142	112	14
5	Newcastle Knights	10	6	0	4	1	238	148	90	14
6	Central Coast Roosters	10	6	0	4	1	222	140	82	14
7	Cronulla-Sutherland Sharks	10	4	0	6	1	207	194	13	10
8	Wentworthville Magpies	10	4	0	6	1	186	236	-50	10
9	Wests Tigers	10	4	0	6	1	165	232	-67	10
10	South Sydney Rabbitohs	10	3	0	7	1	138	245	-107	8
11	St George Dragons	10	0	0	10	1	42	434	-392	2

Final Series
A four team Final Series was scheduled for April 22 and 29.

Semi-finals
1	North Sydney Bears	16
4	Mounties	18
2	Illawarra Steelers	8
3	Canterbury Bulldogs	16

Grand final
3	Canterbury Bulldogs	0
4	Mounties	1

Grand Final

Saturday, 29 April 2023
18:00 AEST (UTC+10)

Canterbury-Bankstown Bulldogs	0 – 1	Mount Pritchard Mounties
	Report; Highlights; Stats	Field goals: 1 Matilda Power 67'

Leichhardt Oval, Sydney
Referee: Nathan Loveday

Player of the Year
On 4 September, Holli Wheeler of the Canterbury-Bankstown Bulldogs was named as the Harvey Norman NSW Women’s Premiership Player of the Year.

== Jersey Flegg ==
The 2023 season of the Jersey Flegg Cup for Under 21 males commenced on the weekend of 4–5 March 2023. Twelve teams competed.

Draw
The New South Wales Rugby League website hosted the official Jersey Flegg Cup draw. The website, League Unlimited, also maintained a draw.

Ladder
The New South Wales Rugby League website hosted the official ladder. The website, League Unlimited, also maintained a ladder.

Pos	Jersey Flegg Team	Pld	W	D	L	B	PF	PA	PD	Pts
1	Sydney Roosters	22	17	1	4	4	650	378	272	43
2	Canterbury-Bankstown Bulldogs	22	15	1	6	4	550	383	167	39
3	Cronulla-Sutherland Sharks	22	14	0	8	4	495	399	96	36
4	Penrith Panthers	22	12	1	9	4	474	419	55	33
5	Parramatta Eels	22	11	0	11	4	484	460	24	30
6	Melbourne Storm	22	11	0	11	4	462	474	-12	30
7	Canberra Raiders	22	10	0	12	4	400	480	-80	28
8	Manly Warringah Sea Eagles	22	9	0	13	4	500	539	-39	26
9	St. George Illawarra Dragons	22	9	0	13	4	450	598	-148	26
10	South Sydney Rabbitohs	22	8	1	13	4	401	594	-193	25
11	Newcastle Knights	22	7	0	15	4	492	524	-32	22
12	Wests Tigers	22	7	0	15	4	440	550	-110	22

Finals series
A Final Series is scheduled for September 2023, following the conclusion of the 26th and last round on Sunday, 27 August 2023.

Qualifying final
2	Canterbury-Bankstown Bulldogs	44
3	Cronulla-Sutherland Sharks	22
4	Penrith Panthers	20
5	Parramatta Eels	30

Major Semi Final
1	Sydney Roosters	6
2	Canterbury-Bankstown Bulldogs	26
Minor Semi Final
3	Cronulla-Sutherland Sharks	6
5	Parramatta Eels	20

Preliminary final
1	Sydney Roosters	31
5	Parramatta Eels	18

Grand Final
2	Canterbury-Bankstown Bulldogs	22
1	Sydney Roosters	20

Player of the Year
On 4 September, Max McCathie, edge forward for the Sydney Roosters, was named as the Jersey Flegg Player of the Year.

== Sydney Shield ==
The 2023 season of the Sydney Shield commenced on the weekend of 18–19 March 2023. Nine teams competed in the 2023 Sydney Shield.

Draw
The website, Play Rugby League hosted the official Sydney Shield draw.
The website, League Unlimited, maintained a Sydney Shield Draw and Results page.

Ladder
The website, Play Rugby League hosted the Sydney Shield ladder.
The website, League Unlimited, also maintained a ladder.

Pos	Sydney Shield Team	Pld	W	D	L	B	WF	LF	PF	PA	PD	Pts
1	St Marys Saints	15	14	0	1	2	1	0	602	250	352	34
2	Penrith Brothers	16	11	0	5	2	0	0	519	284	235	26
3	Hills District Bulls	16	11	0	5	2	0	0	480	354	126	26
4	Cabramatta Two Blues	16	7	1	8	2	0	0	407	479	-72	19
5	Ryde-Eastwood Hawks	16	7	1	8	2	0	0	404	488	-84	19
6	Mounties	16	6	0	10	2	0	0	341	474	-133	16
7	Glebe Dirty Reds	15	5	1	9	2	0	1	376	439	-63	15
8	Wentworthville Magpies	16	5	1	10	2	0	0	392	488	-96	15
9	Moorebank Rams	16	3	0	13	2	0	0	301	566	-265	10

Finals series
A Final Series was scheduled for August 2023, following the conclusion of the 18th and last round on Sunday, 29 July 2023.

Qualifying final
2	Penrith Brothers	34
3	Hills District Bulls	16
4	Cabramatta Two Blues	12
5	Ryde-Eastwood Hawks	16

Major Semi Final
1	St Marys Saints	28
2	Penrith Brothers	10
Minor Semi Final
3	Hills District Bulls	26
5	Ryde-Eastwood Hawks	22

Preliminary final
2	Penrith Brothers	18
3	Hills District Bulls	22

Grand Final
1	St Marys Saints	30
3	Hills District Bulls	34

Grand Final

Sunday, 3 September 2023
3:00pm (AEST)

Hills District Bulls	34 — 30	St Marys Saints
Tries: 6 Thomas Watson 2 Damon Smith; Kruz Niutili-Schmidt; Dylan Marshall; Ceiza James; Goals: 5 Bradley Avery 5	HT: 22-10; Report; Highlights	Tries: 6; 3 Michael Tuavao; Sadee Sub Laban; Jedd Gordon; Saniel Sykes; Goals: 3; 3 Riley Stokes

Netsrata Jubilee Stadium, Carlton
Referee: Daniel Luttringer
Player of the Match: Dylan Marshall

== NSW Men's Country Championships ==
The 2023 Men's Country Championship is scheduled to commence on the weekend of 4–5 February 2023.

There are 10 teams competing in the 2023 Men's Country Championship .

- Central Coast Roosters
- Illawarra South Coast
- Macarthur Wests Tigers
- Monaro Colts
- Newcastle Maitland Region Knights
- North Coast Bulldogs
- Northern Rivers Titans
- Northern Tigers
- Riverina Bulls
- Western Rams

== SG Ball Cup ==
The 2023 season S. G. Ball Cup for Under 19 males commenced on the weekend of 4–5 February 2023. Sixteen teams competed.
Draw
The New South Wales Rugby League website hosted the official SG Ball Cup draw.

Ladder

Pos	Under 19 Team	Pld	W	D	L	B	PF	PA	PD	Pts
1	Canberra Raiders	9	8	0	1	0	326	130	196	16
2	Penrith Panthers	9	8	0	1	0	276	146	130	16
3	Newcastle Knights	9	6	2	1	0	314	158	156	14
4	Parramatta Eels	9	7	0	2	0	258	196	62	14
5	Western Suburbs Magpies	9	6	1	2	0	286	190	96	13
6	Sydney Roosters	9	5	2	2	0	380	170	210	12
7	Illawarra Steelers	9	5	1	3	0	244	162	82	11
8	Canterbury Bulldogs	9	5	0	4	0	228	178	50	10
9	New Zealand Warriors	9	4	0	5	0	176	238	-62	8
10	Cronulla-Sutherland Sharks	9	3	0	6	0	202	240	-38	6
11	St George Dragons	9	3	0	6	0	170	230	-60	6
12	Balmain Tigers	9	3	0	6	0	122	268	-146	6
13	South Sydney Rabbitohs	9	2	0	7	0	149	284	-135	4
14	North Sydney Bears	9	2	0	7	0	172	358	-186	4
15	Manly Warringhah Sea Eagles	9	1	0	8	0	178	247	-69	2
16	Melbourne Storm	9	1	0	8	0	126	412	-286	2

The New South Wales Rugby League website hosted the official SG Ball Cup ladder.

Finals series
A six-team Final Series was scheduled for April 15, 22 and 29.

Elimination Finals
4	Parramatta Eels	18
5	Western Suburbs Magpies	10
3	Newcastle Knights	35
6	Sydney Roosters	10

Semi Finals
1	Canberra Raiders	6
4	Parramatta Eels	14
2	Penrith Panthers	8
3	Newcastle Knights	10

Grand Final
3	Newcastle Knights	22
4	Parramatta Eels	28

Grand Final

Saturday, 29 April 2023
3 pm (AEST)

Newcastle Knights
Tries: 4
Beau Slade 26'
Ethan Ferguson 32'
Mayson Metcalf 53'
Taj Blackman 62'
Goals: 3
Ethan Ferguson 3 27', 33', 53'
22 — 28
HT: 12–12

Parramatta Eels
Tries: 5
Ethan Sanders 5'
Devonte Vaivela 10'
Charlie Guymer 42'
Richard Penisini 47'
Devonte Vaivela 58'

Goals: 4
Ethan Sanders 4 7', 12', 43', 60'

Leichhardt Oval

== Harold Matthews Cup ==
The 2023 season Harold Matthews Cup for Under 17 males commenced on the weekend of 4–5 February 2023. Fifteen teams competed.

Draw
The New South Wales Rugby League website hosted the official Harold Matthews Cup draw.

Ladder

Pos	Under 17 Team	Pld	W	D	L	B	PF	PA	PD	Pts
1	Penrith Panthers	8	6	1	1	1	244	136	108	15
2	Newcastle Knights	8	6	0	2	1	220	126	94	14
3	Parramatta Eels	8	6	0	2	1	186	112	74	14
4	Canterbury Bulldogs	8	6	0	2	1	192	160	32	14
5	Canberra Raiders	8	6	0	2	1	192	160	32	14
6	Cronulla-Sutherland Sharks	8	5	1	2	1	172	120	52	13
7	Illawarra Steelers	8	5	0	3	1	202	142	60	12
8	Western Suburbs Magpies	8	4	0	4	1	164	130	34	10
9	Balmain Tigers	8	4	0	4	1	163	164	-1	10
10	South Sydney Rabbitohs	8	3	2	3	1	174	184	-10	10
11	Sydney Roosters	8	3	0	5	1	152	156	-4	8
12	St George Dragons	8	2	0	6	1	136	182	-46	6
13	Central Coast Roosters	8	1	0	7	1	116	201	-85	4
14	North Sydney Bears	8	1	0	7	1	92	262	-170	4
15	Manly Warringah Sea Eagles	8	0	0	8	1	94	264	-170	2

Finals series
A Final Series was scheduled for April 15, 22 and 29.

Elimination Finals
4	Canterbury Bulldogs	25
5	Canberra Raiders	18
3	Parramatta Eels	18
6	Cronulla-Sutherland Sharks	4

Semi Finals
1	Penrith Panthers	16
4	Canterbury Bulldogs	30
2	Newcastle Knights	18
3	Parramatta Eels	16

Grand Final
2	Newcastle Knights	6
4	Canterbury Bulldogs	32

== Tarsha Gale Cup ==
The 2023 season Tarsha Gale Cup for Under 19 females was scheduled to commence on the weekend of 4–5 February 2023. Thirteen teams competed.

Draw
The New South Wales Rugby League website hosted the official Tarsha Gale Cup draw.

Ladder

Pos	Under 19 Team	Pld	W	D	L	B	PF	PA	PD	Pts
1	Canterbury Bulldogs	8	8	0	0	1	284	52	232	18
2	Indigenous Academy Sydney Roosters	8	8	0	0	1	262	38	224	18
3	Newcastle Knights	8	6	0	2	1	168	86	82	14
4	Illawarra Steelers	8	4	1	3	1	162	82	80	11
5	Parramatta Eels	8	4	1	3	1	112	124	-12	11
6	Canberra Raiders	8	4	1	3	1	158	176	-18	11
7	Penrith Panthers	8	3	1	4	1	118	124	-6	9
8	Cronulla-Sutherland Sharks	8	3	1	4	1	84	172	-88	9
9	North Sydney Bears	8	2	2	4	1	100	134	-34	8
10	Manly Warringah Sea Eagles	8	2	0	6	1	124	174	-50	6
11	South Sydney Rabbitohs	8	2	0	6	1	110	176	-66	6
12	St George Dragons	8	1	1	6	1	70	276	-206	5
13	Wests Tigers	8	1	0	7	1	64	202	-138	4

Finals series
A Final Series was scheduled for April 15, 22 and 29.

Elimination Finals
4	Illawarra Steelers	20
5	Parramatta Eels	4
3	Newcastle Knights	16
6	Canberra Raiders	6

Semi Finals
1	Canterbury Bulldogs	28
4	Illawarra Steelers	0
2	Indigenous Academy Sydney Roosters	40
3	Newcastle Knights	4

Grand Final
1	Canterbury Bulldogs	22
2	Indigenous Academy Sydney Roosters	26

== Laurie Daley Cup ==
The 2023 season Laurie Daley Cup for Under 18 males is scheduled to commence on the weekend of 4–5 February 2023.

There are 10 teams competing in the 2023 Laurie Daley Cup.

- Central Coast Roosters
- Illawarra South Coast
- Macarthur Wests Tigers
- Monaro Colts
- Newcastle Maitland Region Knights
- North Coast Bulldogs
- Northern Rivers Titans
- Northern Tigers
- Riverina Bulls
- Western Rams

Draw and Ladder
The New South Wales Rugby League website hosts the official Laurie Daley Cup draw.

Finals series
A Final Series is scheduled for March 2023, following the conclusion of the 5th and last round on Sunday, 5 March 2023.

== Andrew Johns Cup ==
The 2023 season Andrew Johns Cup for Under 18 males is scheduled to commence on the weekend of 4–5 February 2023.

There are 10 teams competing in the 2023 Andrew Johns Cup.

- Central Coast Roosters
- Illawarra South Coast
- Macarthur Wests Tigers
- Monaro Colts
- Newcastle Maitland Region Knights
- North Coast Bulldogs
- Northern Rivers Titans
- Northern Tigers
- Riverina Bulls
- Western Rams

Draw and Ladder
The New South Wales Rugby League website hosts the official Andrew Johns Cup draw.

Finals series
A Final Series is scheduled for March 2023, following the conclusion of the 5th and last round on Sunday, 5 March 2023.

== City v Country ==
The NSWRL has organised a series of City versus Country matches for the weekend of 4–7 May 2023. Playing squads were announced on 1 May 2023.

Format		Country	Time (AET)	Date	Venue
Women's Open Age	12	18	2.00pm	Thu 4 May	Netstrata Jubilee Stadium, Carlton
Under 16s males	30	0	11.00am	Sat 6 May	Netstrata Jubilee Stadium, Carlton
Under 18s males	30	10	12.35pm	Sat 6 May	Netstrata Jubilee Stadium, Carlton
Men's Open Age	20	26	2.20pm	Sat 6 May	Netstrata Jubilee Stadium, Carlton
Wheelchair rugby league	15	70	4.00pm	Sat 6 May	Queanbeyan PCYC, Queanbeyan PCYC
Physical disability rugby league	16	10	10.00am	Sun 7 May	Netstrata Jubilee Stadium, Carlton
Under 17 females	16	4	11.15am	Sun 7 May	Netstrata Jubilee Stadium, Carlton
Under 19 females	26	8	12.50pm	Sun 7 May	Netstrata Jubilee Stadium, Carlton

=== City versus Country Women ===
Thursday, 4th May, 2023
7.15pm (AEST)

City	12 — 18	Country
Tries: 3 Cassie Staples 1 Tayla Preston 1 Monalisa Soliola 1 Goals: nil Tayla Preston 0/4	HT: 12 – 6 NSWRL	Tries: 3; 2 Teagan Berry; 1 Ellie Johnston; Goals: 3; 3 Kirra Dibb

Netstrata Jubilee Stadium, Carlton
Referee: Karra-Lee Nolan
Player of the Match: Kirra Dibb

== Under 19 State of Origin Women ==
The NSW squad for the 2023 Under 19 Women's match against Queensland. The team is coached by Kate Mullaly.

J#	Player	State Club	NRLW Club 2023	Position(s)	NSW U19					HNW Premiership		U19 Tarsha Gale
J#	Player	State Club	NRLW Club 2023	Position(s)	Dbt	M	T	G	P	2022	2023	2022	2023
—	Charlotte Barwick	Knights	—	Centre	—	0	0	0	0	—	—	—	10m 6m 11g
—	Marley Cardwell	Panthers	—	Prop, Lock	—	0	0	0	0	—	—	—	8m
—	Kate Fallon	Rabbitohs	—	Second-row	—	0	0	0	0	—	—	3m 1m	8m 1m
—	Tatiana Finau	Bulldogs	—	Second-row	—	0	0	0	0	—	3m	—	8m 3m 23g
—	Litia Fusi	Bulldogs	—	Centre	—	0	0	0	0	—	—	5m 1m	10m 9m
—	Kalosipani Hopoate	Bears	Roosters	Prop	—	0	0	0	0	6m 1t	7m 2t	7m 4m	—
—	Chloe Jackson	Bears	—	Second-row	—	0	0	0	0	3m	8m 3t	6m 4m	3m 2m
—	Evie Jones	Knights	—	Five-eighth	—	0	0	0	0	—	—	—	8m 4m
—	Noaria Kapua	Bulldogs	—	Second-row	—	0	0	0	0	—	—	—	10m 6m 7g
—	Chelsea Makira	Bulldogs	—	Halfback	—	0	0	0	0	—	—	6m 2m	10m 1m
—	Leah Ollerton	Knights	—	Hooker	—	0	0	0	0	—	—	6m 1m	10m 7m
—	Latisha Smythe	Bulldogs	—	Prop	—	0	0	0	0	—	—	7m	10m 3m
—	Monalisa Soliola	Bulldogs	Raiders	Second-row	2022	1	0	0	0	5m	10m 2t 5g	6m 4m 5g	—
—	Brooke Talataina	Roosters	—	Five-eighth	—	0	0	0	0	4m	—	3m 3m	8m 8m
—	Alexis Tauaneai	Bulldogs	Dragons	Prop	—	0	0	0	0	—	5m	—	6m 3m
—	Lindsay Tui	Eels	—	Centre	—	0	0	0	0	—	—	—	9m 2m
—	Grace-Lee Weekes	Bears	—	Centre	—	0	0	0	0	—	4m 4t	7m 2m	7m 2m
—	Georgia Willey	Raiders	—	Fullback	—	0	0	0	0	—	—	8m 6m	9m 8m
—	Sienna Williams	Bears	—	Fullback	—	0	0	0	0	2m	—	7m 3m 5g	8m 1m
