= Australian rugby league wooden spooners =

Teams which finished last in the premier top-grade rugby league competition in Australia

The Australian rugby league wooden spooners are the team that finished last in the premier top-grade rugby league competition in Australia, which is currently the National Rugby League, and was previously the New South Wales Rugby Football League (1908-1994), the Australian Rugby League (1995-1997), and Super League (1997). Each of these seasons is considered to represent one continuous line of competition dating back from the first season in 1908. The wooden spoon is an unofficial award, however, fans often bring "real" wooden spoons to taunt opposition sides who are struggling on the bottom of the ladder.

Since the Melbourne Storm's salary cap breach which saw them win the wooden spoon in the 2010 NRL season (more below), betting agencies have instead placed wagers on who would suffer the most losses in a single season, rather than win the wooden spoon itself.

== NRL & Predecessors ==
	Team	No.	SP	%	Years
1	Western Suburbs Magpies	17*	92	18.5%	1909, 1910, 1912, 1913, 1916, 1933, 1940, 1942, 1953, 1955, 1971, 1983, 1984, 1987, 1988, 1998, 1999
2	Parramatta Eels	14	80	17.5%	1947, 1952, 1954, 1956, 1957, 1958, 1959, 1960, 1961, 1970, 1972, 2012, 2013, 2018
3	Sydney University	10	18	55.6%	1921^{†}, 1923, 1927, 1929, 1930, 1931, 1934, 1935^{†}, 1936, 1937^{†}
4	North Sydney Bears	9	92	9.8%	1915, 1917, 1919, 1932, 1941, 1948, 1950, 1951, 1979
=5	Newtown Jets	8	76	10.5%	1924, 1925, 1928, 1939, 1968, 1976, 1977, 1978
=5	South Sydney Rabbitohs	8	117	6.8%	1945, 1946^{†}, 1962, 1975, 1990, 2003, 2004, 2006
7	Canterbury-Bankstown Bulldogs	6	92	6.5%	1943, 1944, 1964, 2002, (Note: The Canterbury-Bankstown Bulldogs finished last after they received a 37 premiership points deduction for gross salary cap breaches. Despite their punishment, statistically South Sydney were the worst performing team of the 2002 season, finishing with 14 competition points and a win–loss ratio of 5/19 compared to the Bulldogs' 20/4 result which, discarding their deduction, would have earned them 44 competition points.) 2008, 2021
=8	Newcastle Knights	5	39	12.8%	2005, 2015, 2016, 2017, 2025
=8	Sydney Roosters	5	119	4.2%	1949, 1963, 1965, 1966^{†}, 2009
=10	Penrith Panthers	4	60	6.7%	1973, 1980, 2001, 2007
=10	Balmain Tigers	4	92	4.3%	1911, 1974, 1981, 1994
=12	Annandale	3	11	27.3%	1914, 1918^{†}, 1920^{†}
=12	Gold Coast Seagulls	3	11	27.3%	1991, 1992, 1993
=12	Illawarra Steelers	3	17	17.6%	1985, 1986, 1989
=12	Wests Tigers	3	27	11.1%	2022, 2023, 2024
=12	North Queensland Cowboys	3	32	9.4%	1995, 1997 (SL), 2000
=12	Cronulla-Sutherland Sharks	3	60	5.0%	1967, 1969, 2014
=12	St George Dragons	3	78	3.8%	1922, 1926, 1938
=18	South Queensland Crushers	2	3	66.7%	1996, 1997 (ARL)
=18	Gold Coast Titans	2	20	10.0%	2011, 2019
=21	Cumberland	1*	1	100%	1908* (disputed) (Note: The holder of the 1908 wooden spoon is unclear, as Western Suburbs and Cumberland finished on the same wins and Wests had a better points differential, but Cumberland were a late addition to the season. The most common view is that Cumberland thus received points from an extra bye, leaving Western Suburbs as the inaugural holders of the wooden spoon, though some dispute this view, including the Western Suburbs Magpies.)
=21	St. George Illawarra Dragons	1	28	3.6%	2026
=21	Melbourne Storm	1	29	3.4%	2010 (Note: The Melbourne Storm finished last on zero points after they received an 8 premiership points deduction and were barred from receiving further premiership points for the rest of the season due to long-term gross salary cap breaches. Despite their punishment, statistically the North Queensland Cowboys were the poorest performing team of the 2010 season, finishing with 14 competition points and a win–loss ratio of 5/19 compared to Melbourne's 14/10 result which, discarding their ban, would have earned them 32 competition points.)
=21	Brisbane Broncos	1	39	2.6%	2020
=21	Canberra Raiders	1	45	2.2%	1982
=25	Hunter Mariners	0	1	0%	
=25	Newcastle Rebels	0	2	0%	
=25	Adelaide Rams	0	2	0%	
=25	Western Reds	0	3	0%	
=25	Northern Eagles	0	3	0%	
=25	Dolphins	0	4	0%	
=25	Glebe	0	22	0%	
=25	New Zealand Warriors	0	32	0%	
=25	Manly Warringah Sea Eagles	0	77	0%	
SP = seasons played; % refers to the percentage of seasons played that resulted in wooden spoons; ^{†} = winless season; records accurate as of end of 2025 season.

== NRL Women's Premiership ==
Bold teams indicate that the club still exists in the present competition.

	Team	No.	SP	%	Years
1	St. George Illawarra Dragons	3	9	33.3%	2018, 2020,^{†} 2026
2	West Tigers	2	4	50.0%	2024, 2025
3	Parramatta Eels	1	6	16.7%	2023
3	Gold Coast Titans	1	6	16.7%	2022
3	Newcastle Knights	1	6	16.7%	2021^{†}
3	Sydney Roosters	1	9	11.1%	2019^{†}
4	Canterbury-Bankstown Bulldogs	0	2	0.0%	—
4	Cronulla-Sutherland Sharks	0	4	0.0%	—
4	Canberra Raiders	0	4	0.0%	—
4	New Zealand Warriors	0	5	0.0%	—
4	North Queensland Cowboys	0	6	0.0&	–
4	Brisbane Broncos	0	9	0.0%	—
SP = seasons played; ^{†} = winless season

== NRL Under-20s ==
	Team	No.	SP	Years
1	Manly Warringah Sea Eagles	3	10	2011, 2013, 2016
=2	New Zealand Warriors	1	10	2017
=2	South Sydney Rabbitohs	1	10	2015
=2	Canterbury-Bankstown Bulldogs	1	10	2014
=2	Gold Coast Titans	1	10	2012
=2	Parramatta Eels	1	10	2010
=2	Cronulla-Sutherland Sharks	1	10	2009
=2	North Queensland Cowboys	1	10	2008
=9	Brisbane Broncos	0	10	
=9	Canberra Raiders	0	10	
=9	Melbourne Storm	0	10	
=9	Newcastle Knights	0	10	
=9	Penrith Panthers	0	10	
=9	St. George Illawarra Dragons	0	10	
=9	Sydney Roosters	0	10	
=9	Wests Tigers	0	10	

== Brisbane Rugby League ==
	Team	No.	SP	%	Years
1	Souths Magpies	14	76	18.42%	1926, 1933^{†}, 1934^{†}, 1935, 1936, 1937, 1941, 1958, 1959, 1960, 1965, 1968, 1969, 1977
=2	Wynnum-Manly Seagulls	13	44	29.55%	1953, 1957, 1962, 1964, 1966, 1967, 1970, 1971, 1972, 1973, 1979, 1990, 1991
=2	Wests Panthers	13	80	16.25%	1918, 1923, 1929, 1942, 1943^{†}, 1946^{†}, 1947, 1974, 1980, 1982, 1983, 1985, 1986
4	Easts Tigers	11	78	14.10%	1917, 1928, 1938, 1939, 1940^{†}, 1944^{†}, 1945^{†}, 1955, 1956, 1961, 1987
5	Norths Devils	7	75	9.33%	1949, 1950, 1954, 1976, 1978, 1984, 1994
6	University	5	14	35.71%	1921, 1924, 1925^{†}, 1927, 1930
=7	Logan City Scorpions	3	7	42.86%	1988, 1989, 1993
=7	Past Brothers	3	64	4.69%	1931, 1963, 1981
=7	Fortitude Valley	3	85	3.53%	1948, 1951, 1975
=10	Railways	2	4	50%	1913, 1920
=10	West End	2	5	40%	1915^{†}, 1919
=12	South Brisbane United	1	1	100%	1911^{†}
=12	Ipswich Starlights	1	1	100%	1916
=12	Wynnum	1	1	100%	1932
=12	South Coast	1	1	100%	1952
=12	Woolloongabba	1	3	33.33%	1912
=12	Toombul	1	4	25%	1909
=12	North Brisbane	1	4	25%	1914
=12	South Brisbane	1	6	16.67%	1910
=12	Ipswich Jets	1	9	11.11%	1992
=12	Past Brothers (Merthyr)	1	12	8.33%	1922
	^{†} = winless season				

== NSW Cup ==
	Team	No.	SP	Years
**1**	**Western Suburbs Magpies**	3	7	2012, 2017, 2024
**2**	**Newcastle Knights**	2	7	2016, 2018
**2**	**Blacktown Workers Sea Eagles**	2	5	2019, 2022
**2**	**North Sydney Bears**	2	7	2010, 2014
**2**	Manly Warringah Sea Eagles	2	6	2011, 2026
**3**	Wyong Roos	1	7	2013
**3**	Wentworthville Magpies	1	7	2015
**3**	Sydney Roosters	1	3	2023
**3**	**South Sydney Rabbitohs**	1	7	2025
**3**	**Mount Pritchard Mounties**	0	7	
**3**	**Penrith Panthers**	0	7	
**3**	**St. George Illawarra Dragons**	0	1	
**3**	Illawarra Cutters	0	6	
**3**	**Newtown Jets**	0	7	
**3**	Cronulla-Sutherland Sharks	0	2	
**3**	Windsor Wolves	0	3	
**3**	**Canterbury-Bankstown Bulldogs**	0	4	
**3**	**New Zealand Warriors**	0	2	
**3**	**Parramatta Eels**	0	5	
SP denotes seasons played, Bold denotes team is still in competition

== Queensland Cup ==
Bold teams indicate that the club still exists in the present competition.

	Team	No.	SP	Years
**1**	**Central Queensland Capras**	6	29	2005, 2007, 2015, 2017, 2019, 2021
**=2**	**Souths Logan Magpies**	4	29	1999, 2001, 2012, 2022
**=2**	**Ipswich Jets**	4	29	1996^{†}, 2006, 2010, 2023^{†}
**=4**	**Mackay Cutters**	3	17	2009, 2016, 2018
**=4**	**Sunshine Coast Falcons**	3	17	2011, 2013, 2014
**6**	Logan Scorpions	2	6	1997, 2002^{†}
**=7**	**Norths Devils**	1	29	2008
**=7**	Brothers-Valleys	1	1	2004
**=7**	Wests Panthers	1	7	2003^{†}
**=7**	Cairns Cyclones	1	5	2000
**=7**	**Western Clydesdales**	1	13	2024
**=7**	Bundaberg Grizzlies	1	3	1998^{†}
**=7**	**Papua New Guinea Hunters**	1	21	2026
**14**	Aspley Broncos	0	1	
**14**	Gold Coast Vikings	0	1	
**14**	Mackay Sea Eagles	0	1	
**14**	Townsville Stingers	0	1	
**14**	Port Moresby Vipers	0	2	
**14**	Brisbane Brothers	0	3	
**14**	**Townsville Blackhawks**	0	10	
**14**	North Queensland Young Guns	0	6	
**14**	**Northern Pride**	0	17	
**14**	**Tweed Heads Seagulls**	0	23	
**14**	**Burleigh Bears**	0	28	
**14**	**Brisbane Tigers**	0	29	
**14**	**Redcliffe Dolphins**	0	29	
**14**	**Wynnum Manly Seagulls**	0	29	
^{†} = winless season Note: 2020 season cancelled after one round

== Ron Massey Cup ==
	Team	No.	SP	Years
**1**	Kingsgrove Colts	3		2013, 2015, 2016
**2**	**Brothers Penrith**	2		2018, 2019
**2**	**Blacktown Workers Sea Eagles**	2		2012, 2025
**2**	**Western Suburbs Magpies**	1		2017, 2022
**2**	**Manly Leagues**	1		2026
**3**	Burwood North Ryde	1		2014
**3**	Canterbury-Bankstown Bulldogs	1		2023
**3**	Hills District Bulls	1		2024
**4**	**Concord-Burwood-Glebe Wolves**	0		
**4**	Auburn Warriors	0		
**4**	**Wentworthville Magpies**	0		
**4**	**St Marys Saints**	0		
**4**	The Entrance Tigers	0		
**4**	St Johns Eagles	0		
**4**	Windsor Wolves	0		
**4**	**Asquith Magpies**	0		
**4**	**Guildford Owls**	0		
**4**	**Cabramatta Two Blues**	0		
**4**	Newtown Jets	0		
SP denotes seasons played, Bold denotes still in competition

== Reversing fortunes ==
Western Suburbs were the only team to finish last in a season (1933) and then back up with a premiership in the following year. In season 2009 the Sydney Roosters finished last, winning just five games, however conjured a remarkable turnaround on and off the field to make the Grand final the following season.

In 2026, the Newcastle Knights repeated the feat of the Sydney Roosters from 2010, going from wooden spooners in 2025 to make it to the 2026 Grand Final and got within 1 point of the premiership, against the Sydney Roosters.

In 2003, the Penrith Panthers won a premiership after finishing wooden spooners in 2001, and after finishing round 2 of the 2003 season in last place (15th). In the 2014 NRL season, the Cronulla-Sutherland Sharks were the wooden spoon recipients. They went on to win the 2016 Premiership.

After winning the 1942 premiership, Canterbury-Bankstown then crashed to last place in season 1943. After winning the 1952 premiership, Western Suburbs finished last in the season 1953. South Sydney went from minor premiers in 1989 to wooden spooners in 1990.

In 2010, the Melbourne Storm received the wooden spoon, albeit in unusual circumstances. The Storm then went on to win its first official minor premiership in the 2011 season, before finishing one game short of the grand final.

== Avoiding the spoon ==
As of 2026, the Manly-Warringah Sea Eagles have avoided the wooden spoon in their 77 completed seasons since entering the competition in 1947. They are the only current club from the pre-ARL era to have avoided the wooden spoon. Two other current clubs have also never claimed the wooden spoon: New Zealand Warriors (32), and Dolphins (4).

The Balmain Tigers enjoyed a sixty-two season wooden spoon drought from 1911-1974, and St. George Dragons had gone 60 seasons (1939-1998) prior to the joint venture with the Illawarra Steelers.

== Spoon Bowl ==
In recent NRL seasons, the media had started to describe the matches between the two last placed sides as the "Spoon Bowl". One of the first instances the term being used was in 2011 when the Parramatta Eels and the Gold Coast Titans played against each other in the final match of the regular season with the loser receiving the wooden spoon. In 2014, the term was used again when Canberra played against Cronulla with both sides sitting on the bottom of the table. In 2015, Newcastle and Penrith played against each other in the third instance of the "Spoon Bowl" term to be used. In 2017, the Wests Tigers and Newcastle played in the fourth spoon bowl game with Wests defeating Newcastle and avoiding last place. In 2018, Parramatta who were in last place and Canterbury who were in second last faced off against each other in the fifth edition of the spoon bowl. There were fears before the match that it could have been the lowest crowd for an NRL game in 20 years. Parramatta went on to win the game 14-8. In Round 24 of the 2018 season, Parramatta played against North Queensland in the sixth edition of the spoon bowl. North Queensland won the match 44-6 in Townsville which was also Johnathan Thurston's final home game before retirement, the match was also Matt Scott's 250th game. The result ensured Parramatta finished with the wooden spoon, their 14th in total.

In round 24 of the 2022 NRL season, the Gold Coast who were second last on the table played against Newcastle who were third bottom in the Spoon Bowl match. The Gold Coast needed a win to ensure their survival from the wooden spoon whilst Newcastle could have mathematically still received it. The Gold Coast would win the match 36-26, ensuring the Wests Tigers would finish last for the first time in their 22-year history.

In round 21 of the 2023 NRL season, St. George Illawarra and the Wests Tigers contested the 8th edition of the spoon bowl match. St. George Illawarra were in second last place on the table just two points clear of Wests Tigers who were bottom of the ladder. St. George Illawarra would win the match 18-14 in a close contest; by the end of the year, St. George Illawarra were only separated from Wests by that one win, leaving the Tigers with the wooden spoon.

In round 27 of the 2024 NRL season, Parramatta and the Wests Tigers played in the 9th edition of the Spoon Bowl fixture with Parramatta winning the match 60-26 which condemned Wests to their third consecutive wooden spoon.

In round 23 of the 2025 NRL season, South Sydney and the Gold Coast contested the 10th edition of the Spoon Bowl with South Sydney narrowly winning 20-18. Unlike the previous three iterations of the spoon bowl, the 2025 game had no bearing on the ultimate last place finisher; South Sydney would win two more games to finish in 14th, while the Gold Coast eventually won another game in round 27, condemning the Newcastle Knights to the wooden spoon on for and against.

== See also ==
- Wooden spoon (award)
