= 2013 New South Wales Cup =

Australian rugby competition

- League: New South Wales Cup
- Teams: 13
- Champions: Cronulla-Sutherland Sharks
- Runners-up: Windsor Wolves
- Premiership winners: Cronulla-Sutherland Sharks
- Wooden spoon: Wyong Roos
- Man of Steel: Mitch Williams ( Wyong Roos)

Ron Massey Cup
- Number of teams: 12
- Premiers: Wentworthville Magpies
- Minor Premiers: Cabramatta Two Blues
- Runners-up: Mounties
- Player of the year: Dean Rysko ( Western Suburbs Magpies)

Sydney Shield
- Premiers: Belrose Eagles
- Minor Premiers: Belrose Eagles
- Runners-up: Wentworthville Magpies
- Player of the year: James Mortimer ( Belrose Eagles)
- Top point-scorer(s): James Mortimer 268 ( Belrose Eagles)

The 2013 New South Wales Cup season is the second tier rugby league competition held in New South Wales, after the National Rugby League. The 2012 season of the New South Wales Cup commences on Saturday 19 March 2013. The Minor Premiership has ended with Cronulla sitting on top of the ladder at 43 points as the teams head into finals. The grand final will be played at ANZ Stadium at the 2013 NRL Grand Final, and will be broadcast by Fox Sports.

== Clubs ==
In 2013, 13 clubs are fielding teams in the New South Wales Cup.

Colors	Club	Location	Stadium	Founded	Joined*	A-Grade Team
	Auckland Vulcans	Auckland, New Zealand	Mt Smart Stadium, Auckland	2007	2008	New Zealand Warriors
	Canterbury-Bankstown Bulldogs	Belmore, NSW, Australia	Belmore Sports Ground, Belmore	1934	2008	Canterbury-Bankstown Bulldogs
	Cronulla-Sutherland Sharks	Cronulla, NSW, Australia	Toyota Park, Woolooware	1963	2008	Cronulla-Sutherland Sharks; Melbourne Storm
	Illawarra Cutters	Illawarra, NSW, Australia	WIN Stadium, Wollongong	2012	2012	St. George-Illawarra Dragons
	Manly-Warringah Sea Eagles	Manly, NSW, Australia	Brookvale Oval, Manly	1946	2008	Manly-Warringah Sea Eagles
	Mount Pritchard Mounties	Mount Pritchard, NSW, Australia	Mt Pritchard Oval, Mount Pritchard	2012	2012	Canberra Raiders
	Newcastle Knights	Newcastle, NSW, Australia	Hunter Stadium, Newcastle	1988	2012	Newcastle Knights
	Newtown Jets	Newtown, NSW, Australia	Henson Park, Newtown	1908	2008	Sydney Roosters
	North Sydney Bears	Sydney, NSW, Australia	North Sydney Oval, Sydney	1908	2008	South Sydney Rabbitohs
	Wentworthville Magpies	Wentworthville, NSW, Australia	Ringrose Park, Wentworthville	1963	2008	Parramatta Eels
	Wests Tigers	Campbelltown, NSW, Australia	Campbelltown Stadium, Campbelltown; Leichhardt Oval, Leichhardt	1999	2013	Wests Tigers
	Windsor Wolves	Windsor, NSW, Australia	Windsor Sporting Complex, Windsor	2003	2008	Penrith Panthers
	Wyong Roos	Kanwal, NSW, Australia	Morrie Breen Oval, Kanwal	1910	2013	None

*: The season the team joined is in the NSW Cup, not any other competition before this.

== Ladder ==
2013 New South Wales Cup season
	Team	Pld	W	D	L	B	PF	PA	PD	Pts
1	Cronulla-Sutherland Sharks(P)	24	19	1	4	2	695	332	+363	43
2	Newcastle Knights	24	18	0	6	2	672	511	+161	40
3	North Sydney Bears	24	17	0	7	2	755	426	+329	38
4	Windsor Wolves	24	14	1	9	2	758	601	+157	33
5	Newtown Jets	24	14	0	10	2	692	568	+124	32
6	Auckland Vulcans	24	12	1	11	2	590	569	+35	29
7	Wests Tigers	24	11	0	13	2	611	627	-16	26
8	Wentworthville Magpies	24	11	0	13	2	657	729	-72	26
9	Illawarra Cutters	24	10	1	13	2	560	654	-94	25
10	Mount Pritchard Mounties	24	10	0	14	2	541	618	-77	24
11	Manly Sea Eagles	19	7	0	17	2	372	794	-422	18
12	Canterbury-Bankstown Bulldogs	20	6	0	18	2	514	676	-162	16
13	Wyong Roos	24	5	0	19	2	466	778	-312	14

== Season ==
=== Round 1 ===
Date	Time	Home	Away	Venue	Result
Sat, 9 Mar	1:05 PM	Wentworthville Magpies	Mounties	Parramatta Stadium	32 - 18
Sat, 9 Mar	3:00 PM	Canterbury Bankstown Bulldogs	North Sydney Bears	Belmore Sports Ground	16 - 38
Sat, 9 Mar	3:00 PM	Manly Sea Eagles	Auckland Vulcans	Brookvale Oval	26 - 24
Sat, 9 Mar	3:00 PM	Illawarra Cutters	Newtown Jets	WIN Stadium, Wgong	10 - 30
Sun, 10 Mar	2:30 PM	Cronulla Sharks	Wests Tigers	Toyota Stadium	36 - 16
Sun, 10 Mar	3:00 PM	Wyong Roos	Newcastle Knights	Morrie Breen	24 - 36

Windsor Wolves Bye

=== Round 2 ===
Date	Time	Home	Away	Venue	Result
Sat, 16 Mar	1:00 PM	Auckland Vulcans	Newtown Jets	Mt Smart Stadium	24 - 12
Sat, 16 Mar	1:05 PM	Canterbury Bankstown Bulldogs	Illawarra Cutters	Leichhardt Oval	26 - 16
Sat, 16 Mar	3:00 PM	Cronulla Sharks	North Sydney Bears	Toyota Stadium	16 - 8
Sat, 16 Mar	3:00 PM	Mounties	Manly Sea Eagles	Mt Pritchard Sports Ground	40 - 10
Sun, 17 Mar	11:00 AM	Wests Tigers	Windsor Wolves	Campbelltown Sprts Std	42 - 44
Sun, 17 Mar	3:00 PM	Wentworthville Magpies	Wyong Roos	Ringrose Park	34 - 24

Newcastle Knights Bye

=== Round 3 ===
Date	Time	Home	Away	Venue	Result
Sat, 23 Mar	1:05 PM	Wests Tigers	Manly Sea Eagles	Leichhardt Oval	50 - 12
Sat, 23 Mar	3:00 PM	Mounties	Cronulla Sharks	Mt Pritchard Sports Ground	6 - 32
Sat, 23 Mar	3:00 PM	Canterbury Bankstown Bulldogs	Wentworthville Magpies	Belmore Sports Ground	26 - 36
Sat, 23 Mar	3:00 PM	Newtown Jets	North Sydney Bears	Henson Park	12 - 24
Sun, 24 Mar	3:00 PM	Newcastle Knights	Auckland Vulcans	Newcastle No.2 Sprtsgrnd, NSW	30 - 10
Sun, 24 Mar	3:00 PM	Wyong Roos	Windsor Wolves	Morrie Breen	22 - 38

Illawarra Cutters Bye

=== Round 4 ===
Date	Time	Home	Away	Venue	Result
Sat, 30 Mar	3:10 PM	Cronulla Sharks	Newtown Jets	Toyota Stadium	32 - 24
Sat, 30 Mar	3:00 PM	Wests Tigers	Wentworthville Magpies	Leichhardt Oval	26 - 24
Sat, 30 Mar	3:00 PM	Manly Sea Eagles	Canterbury Bankstown Bulldogs	Brookvale Oval	36 - 12
Sat, 30 Mar	3:00 PM	Illawarra Cutters	North Sydney Bears	WIN Stadium, Wgong	12 - 42
Sun, 31 Mar	2:30 PM	Newcastle Knights	Mounties	Hunter Stadium	26 - 20
Mon, 1 Apr	12:00 PM	Auckland Vulcans	Windsor Wolves	Mt Smart Stadium	24 - 24

Wyong Roos Bye

=== Round 5 ===
Date	Time	Home	Away	Venue	Result
Sat, 6 Apr	1:05 PM	Wentworthville Magpies	Newcastle Knights	Parramatta Stadium	36 - 30
Sat, 6 Apr	3:00 PM	Manly Sea Eagles	Newtown Jets	Brookvale Oval	10 - 38
Sat, 6 Apr	3:00 PM	Canterbury Bankstown Bulldogs	Wests Tigers	Belmore Sports Ground	18 - 22
Sat, 6 Apr	6:00 PM	Windsor Wolves	Illawarra Cutters	Windsor Sports Complex	40 - 16
Sun, 7 Apr	12:00 PM	Auckland Vulcans	North Sydney Bears	Mt Smart Stadium	10 - 22
Sun, 7 Apr	3:00 PM	Wyong Roos	Cronulla Sharks	Morrie Breen	12 - 46

Mounties Bye

=== Round 6 ===
Date	Time	Home	Away	Venue	Result
Sat, 13 Apr	1:05 PM	Newcastle Knights	Windsor Wolves	Hunter Stadium	42 - 28
Sat, 13 Apr	3:00 PM	Cronulla Sharks	Canterbury Bankstown Bulldogs	Toyota Stadium	28 - 16
Sat, 13 Apr	3:00 PM	Mounties	Auckland Vulcans	Mt Pritchard Sports Ground	6 - 28
Sat, 13 Apr	3:00 PM	Manly Sea Eagles	Illawarra Cutters	Brookvale Oval	16 - 36
Sun, 14 Apr	3:00 PM	Wentworthville Magpies	Newtown Jets	Ringrose Park	22 - 62
Sun, 14 Apr	3:00 PM	North Sydney Bears	Wyong Roos	North Sydney Oval	28 - 12

Wests Tigers Bye

=== City v Country ===
Date	Time	Home	Away	Venue	Result
Sat, 20 Apr	3:10 PM	Mounties	North Sydney Bears	Centrebet Stadium	10 - 12
Sun, 21 Apr	12:00 PM	Wentworthville Magpies	Windsor Wolves	Ringrose Park	22 - 36
Wed, 1 May	7:30 PM	Canterbury Bankstown Bulldogs	Wyong Roos	Belmore Sports Ground	18 - 22
Wed, 8 May	5:30 PM	Manly Sea Eagles	Cronulla Sharks	Leichhardt Oval	4 - 32
Wed, 8 May	7:30 PM	Wests Tigers	Illawarra Cutters	Leichhardt Oval	38 - 24

Auckland Vulcans Bye

=== Round 7 ===
Date	Time	Home	Away	Venue	Result
Sat, 27 Apr	1:00 PM	Auckland Vulcans	Wests Tigers	Mt Smart Stadium	26 - 24
Sat, 27 Apr	1:00 PM	Cronulla Sharks	Newcastle Knights	Henson Park	50 - 16
Sat, 27 Apr	1:10 PM	Wyong Roos	Illawarra Cutters	Leichhardt Oval	12 - 40
Sat, 27 Apr	3:00 PM	Newtown Jets	Mounties	Henson Park	16 - 22
Sat, 27 Apr	6:00 PM	Windsor Wolves	Manly Sea Eagles	Windsor Sports Complex	20 - 22
Sun, 28 Apr	3:00 PM	North Sydney Bears	Wentworthville Magpies	North Sydney Oval	46 - 18

Canterbury Bankstown Bulldogs Bye

=== Round 8 ===
Date	Time	Home	Away	Venue	Result
Sat, 4 May	1:00 PM	Cronulla Sharks	Auckland Vulcans	Henson Park	48 - 10
Sat, 4 May	1:05 PM	Newcastle Knights	Canterbury Bankstown Bulldogs	Leichhardt Oval	26 - 18
Sat, 4 May	3:00 PM	Manly Sea Eagles	Wentworthville Magpies	Brookvale Oval	14 - 38
Sat, 4 May	3:00 PM	Newtown Jets	Illawarra Cutters	Henson Park	20 - 28
Sat, 4 May	3:00 PM	Mounties	Wyong Roos	Mt Pritchard Sports Ground	44 - 24
Sun, 5 May	3:00 PM	North Sydney Bears	Wests Tigers	North Sydney Oval	12 - 16

Windsor Wolves Bye

=== Round 9 ===
Date	Time	Home	Away	Venue	Result
Sat, 11 May	1:05 PM	Auckland Vulcans	Wyong Roos	Westpac Stadium	24 - 28
Sat, 11 May	3:00 PM	Illawarra Cutters	Wentworthville Magpies	WIN Stadium, Wgong	28 - 22
Sat, 11 May	3:00 PM	Canterbury Bankstown Bulldogs	Mounties	Belmore Sports Ground	22 - 26
Sun, 12 May	2:30 PM	Windsor Wolves	Cronulla Sharks	Centrebet Stadium	16 - 29
Sun, 12 May	3:00 PM	North Sydney Bears	Manly Sea Eagles	North Sydney Oval	54 - 6
Sun, 12 May	3:00 PM	Newcastle Knights	Wests Tigers	Newcastle No.2 Sprtsgrnd, NSW	10 - 8

Newtown Jets Bye

=== Round 10 ===
Date	Time	Home	Away	Venue	Result
Sat, 18 May	1:05 PM	Illawarra Cutters	Cronulla Sharks	WIN Stadium, Wgong	12 - 28
Sat, 18 May	3:00 PM	Wests Tigers	Newtown Jets	Leichhardt Oval	26 - 30
Sat, 18 May	3:00 PM	Canterbury Bankstown Bulldogs	Auckland Vulcans	Belmore Sports Ground	38 - 30
Sat, 18 May	3:00 PM	Manly Sea Eagles	Newcastle Knights	Brookvale Oval	18 - 22
Sat, 18 May	6:00 PM	Windsor Wolves	Mounties	Windsor Sports Complex	48 - 6
Sun, 19 May	3:00 PM	Wyong Roos	Wentworthville Magpies	Morrie Breen	16 - 55

North Sydney Bears Bye

=== Round 11 ===
Date	Time	Home	Away	Venue	Result
Sat, 25 May	1:05 PM	Illawarra Cutters	Windsor Wolves	WIN Jubilee Oval, Kgrh	32 - 36
Sat, 25 May	3:00 PM	Manly Sea Eagles	Mounties	Brookvale Oval	24 - 20
Sat, 25 May	3:00 PM	North Sydney Bears	Newtown Jets	North Sydney Oval	24 - 40
Sat, 25 May	3:00 PM	Wests Tigers	Wyong Roos	Campbelltown Sprts Std	39 - 26
Sun, 26 May	12:00 PM	Auckland Vulcans	Newcastle Knights	Mt Smart Stadium	28 - 24
Sun, 26 May	3:00 PM	Wentworthville Magpies	Canterbury Bankstown Bulldogs	Ringrose Park	24 - 28

Cronulla Sharks Bye

=== Round 12 ===
Date	Time	Home	Away	Venue	Result
Sat, 1 Jun	1:00 PM	Auckland Vulcans	Illawarra Cutters	Mt Smart #2	36 - 10
Sat, 1 Jun	3:00 PM	Canterbury Bankstown Bulldogs	Newtown Jets	Belmore Sports Ground	18 - 30
Sat, 1 Jun	3:10 PM	North Sydney Bears	Cronulla Sharks	Leichhardt Oval	16 - 26
Sat, 1 Jun	6:00 PM	Windsor Wolves	Wests Tigers	Windsor Sports Complex	28 - 12
Sun, 2 Jun	3:00 PM	Wyong Roos	Manly Sea Eagles	Morrie Breen	26 - 10
Sun, 2 Jun	3:00 PM	Newcastle Knights	Wentworthville Magpies	Newcastle No.2 Sprtsgrnd, NSW	20 - 14

Mounties Bye

=== Round 13 ===
Date	Time	Home	Away	Venue	Result
Sat, 8 Jun	1:00 PM	North Sydney Bears	Canterbury Bankstown Bulldogs	North Sydney Oval	42 - 20
Sat, 8 Jun	1:05 PM	Newcastle Knights	Illawarra Cutters	Hunter Stadium	28 - 26
Sat, 8 Jun	3:00 PM	Cronulla Sharks	Mounties	Toyota Stadium	10 - 0
Sun, 9 Jun	12:00 PM	Auckland Vulcans	Manly Sea Eagles	Mt Smart Stadium	38 - 10
Sun, 9 Jun	3:00 PM	Wentworthville Magpies	Wests Tigers	Ringrose Park	26 - 24
Sun, 9 Jun	3:00 PM	Newtown Jets	Windsor Wolves	Pioneer Oval	26 - 22

Wyong Roos Bye

=== Round 14 ===
Date	Time	Home	Away	Venue	Result
Sat, 15 Jun	1:05 PM	Wests Tigers	Canterbury Bankstown Bulldogs	Leichhardt Oval	36 - 20
Sat, 15 Jun	3:00 PM	Illawarra Cutters	Mounties	WIN Stadium, Wgong	32 - 26
Sat, 15 Jun	3:15 PM	Cronulla Sharks	Wentworthville Magpies	Toyota Stadium	44 - 20
Sat, 15 Jun	6:00 PM	Windsor Wolves	Auckland Vulcans	Windsor Sports Complex	14 - 20
Sun, 16 Jun	3:00 PM	Wyong Roos	Newtown Jets	Morrie Breen	6 - 40
Sun, 16 Jun	3:00 PM	Newcastle Knights	North Sydney Bears	Newcastle No.2 Sprtsgrnd, NSW	20 - 10

Manly Sea Eagles Bye

=== Round 15 ===
Date	Time	Home	Away	Venue	Result
Sat, 22 Jun	3:00 PM	Wests Tigers	Auckland Vulcans	Campbelltown Sprts Std	20 - 18
Sat, 22 Jun	3:00 PM	Illawarra Cutters	Wyong Roos	WIN Stadium, Wgong	36 - 28
Sat, 22 Jun	3:00 PM	Newtown Jets	Cronulla Sharks	Henson Park	16 - 18
Sat, 22 Jun	3:00 PM	Mounties	Wentworthville Magpies	Mt Pritchard Sports Ground	35 - 6
Sat, 22 Jun	3:00 PM	Canterbury Bankstown Bulldogs	Manly Sea Eagles	Belmore Sports Ground	8 - 18
Wed, 3 Jul	7:30 PM	North Sydney Bears	Windsor Wolves	North Sydney Oval	24 - 28

Newcastle Knights Bye

=== Round 16 ===
Date	Time	Home	Away	Venue	Result
Sat, 29 Jun	3:00 PM	Manly Sea Eagles	Windsor Wolves	Brookvale Oval	6 - 20
Sat, 29 Jun	3:00 PM	Mounties	Newtown Jets	Mt Pritchard Sports Ground	34 - 16
Sun, 30 Jun	12:00 PM	Auckland Vulcans	Cronulla Sharks	Mt Smart Stadium	18 - 16
Sun, 30 Jun	1:05 PM	Wests Tigers	Newcastle Knights	Campbelltown Stadium	18 - 38
Sun, 30 Jun	3:00 PM	Wyong Roos	Canterbury Bankstown Bulldogs	Morrie Breen	26 - 24
Sun, 30 Jun	3:00 PM	North Sydney Bears	Illawarra Cutters	North Sydney Oval	42 - 14

Wentworthville Magpies Bye

=== Round 17 ===
Date	Time	Home	Away	Venue	Result
Sat, 6 Jul	1:00 PM	Cronulla Sharks	Windsor Wolves	Henson Park	26 - 24
Sat, 6 Jul	1:05 PM	Illawarra Cutters	Manly Sea Eagles	WIN Jubilee Oval, Kgrh	24 - 26
Sat, 6 Jul	3:00 PM	Canterbury Bankstown Bulldogs	Newcastle Knights	Belmore Sports Ground	20 - 38
Sat, 6 Jul	3:00 PM	Wests Tigers	Mounties	Campbelltown Sprts Std	40 - 18
Sat, 6 Jul	3:00 PM	Newtown Jets	Wentworthville Magpies	Henson Park	28 - 26
Sun, 7 Jul	3:00 PM	Wyong Roos	North Sydney Bears	Morrie Breen	14 - 26

Auckland Vulcans Bye

=== Round 18 ===
Date	Time	Home	Away	Venue	Result
Sat, 13 Jul	1:10 PM	Wentworthville Magpies	Manly Sea Eagles	Parramatta Stadium	20 - 10
Sat, 13 Jul	3:00 PM	Newtown Jets	Newcastle Knights	Henson Park	26 - 14

=== Round 19 ===
Date	Time	Home	Away	Venue	Result
Sat, 20 Jul	1:00 PM	Cronulla Sharks	Illawarra Cutters	Henson Park	16 - 16
Sat, 20 Jul	1:10 PM	Mounties	Newcastle Knights	Canberra Stadium	28 - 16
Sat, 20 Jul	3:00 PM	Canterbury Bankstown Bulldogs	Windsor Wolves	Belmore Sports Ground	32 - 30
Sat, 20 Jul	3:00 PM	Newtown Jets	Auckland Vulcans	Henson Park	40 - 26
Sun, 21 Jul	3:00 PM	Wyong Roos	Wests Tigers	Morrie Breen	18 - 30

North Sydney Bears Bye

=== Round 20 ===
Date	Time	Home	Away	Venue	Result
Sat, 27 Jul	1:05 PM	Illawarra Cutters	Auckland Vulcans	WIN Stadium, Wgong	17 -16
Sat, 27 Jul	3:00 PM	Mounties	Canterbury Bankstown Bulldogs	Mt Pritchard Sports Ground	26 - 24
Sat, 27 Jul	3:00 PM	Manly Sea Eagles	Wyong Roos	Brookvale Oval	28 - 24
Sat, 27 Jul	5:00 PM	Newcastle Knights	Cronulla Sharks	Newcastle No.2 Sprtsgrnd, NSW	16 - 8
Sat, 27 Jul	6:00 PM	Windsor Wolves	Newtown Jets	Windsor Sports Complex	36 - 24
Sun, 28 Jul	3:00 PM	Wentworthville Magpies	North Sydney Bears	Ringrose Park	24 - 64

Wests Tigers Bye

=== Round 21 ===
Date	Time	Home	Away	Venue	Result
Sat, 3 Aug	1:00 PM	Auckland Vulcans	Wentworthville Magpies	Mt Smart #2	44–10
Sat, 3 Aug	3:00 PM	Illawarra Cutters	Canterbury Bankstown Bulldogs	WIN Stadium, Wgong	26–22
Sat, 3 Aug	3:00 PM	North Sydney Bears	Mounties	North Sydney Oval	30–26
Sat, 3 Aug	3:00 PM	Cronulla Sharks	Wyong Roos	Toyota Stadium	24–0
Sat, 3 Aug	3:00 PM	Newtown Jets	Wests Tigers	Henson Park	44–22
Sat, 3 Aug	6:00 PM	Windsor Wolves	Newcastle Knights	Windsor Sports Complex	36–38

Manly Sea Eagles Bye

=== Round 22 ===
Date	Time	Home	Away	Venue	Result
Sat, 10 Aug	1:00 PM	Auckland Vulcans	Canterbury Bankstown Bulldogs	Mt Smart #2	22–12
Sat, 10 Aug	3:00 PM	Wests Tigers	Cronulla Sharks	Campbelltown Sprts Std	6-46
Sat, 10 Aug	3:00 PM	Newtown Jets	Manly Sea-Eagles	Henson Park	50–32
Sat, 10 Aug	6:00 PM	Windsor Wolves	Wentworthville Magpies	Windsor Sports Complex	42–46
Sun, 11 Aug	3:00 PM	Wyong Roos	Mounties	Morrie Breen	24–20
Sun, 11 Aug	3:00 PM	North Sydney Bears	Newcastle Knights	North Sydney Oval	23–10

Illawarra Cutters Bye

=== Round 23 ===
Date	Time	Home	Away	Venue	Result
Sat, 17 Aug	3:00 PM	Canterbury Bankstown Bulldogs	Cronulla Sharks	Belmore Sports Ground	28–18
Sat, 17 Aug	3:00 PM	Manly Sea Eagles	Wests Tigers	Brookvale Oval	18–28
Sat, 17 Aug	3:00 PM	Mounties	Illawarra Cutters	Canberra Stadium	24–22
Sat, 17 Aug	6:00 PM	Windsor Wolves	North Sydney Bears	Windsor Sports Complex	48–28
Sun, 18 Aug	3:00 PM	Newcastle Knights	Newtown Jets	Newcastle No.2 Sprtsgrnd, NSW	38–10
Sun, 18 Aug	3:00 PM	Wyong Roos	Auckland Vulcans	Morrie Breen	20–38

Wentworthville Magpies Bye

=== Round 24 ===
Date	Time	Home	Away	Venue	Result
Sat, 24 Aug	3:00 PM	Cronulla Sharks	Manly Sea Eagles	Toyota Stadium	54–0
Sat, 24 Aug	3:00 PM	Illawarra Cutters	Newcastle Knights	SCG	26–30
Sat, 24 Aug	3:00 PM	Newtown Jets	Wyong Roos	Henson Park	28–20
Sat, 24 Aug	3:00 PM	Mounties	Windsor Wolves	Mt Pritchard Sports Ground	26–46
Sat, 24 Aug	3:00 PM	Wests Tigers	North Sydney Bears	Campbelltown Sprts Std	16–32
Sun, 25 Aug	3:00 PM	Wentworthville Magpies	Auckland Vulcans	Ringrose Park	42–22

Canterbury Bankstown Bulldogs Bye

=== Round 25 ===
Date	Time	Home	Away	Venue	Result
Sat, 31 Aug	1:00 PM	Auckland Vulcans	Mounties	Mt Smart #2	48–28
Sat, 31 Aug	3:00 PM	Illawarra Cutters	Wests Tigers	WIN Stadium, Wgong	27–22
Sat, 31 Aug	3:00 PM	Manly Sea Eagles	North Sydney Bears	Brookvale Oval	6-60
Sat, 31 Aug	3:00 PM	Windsor Wolves	Canterbury Bankstown Bulldogs		30–14
Sun, 1 Sep	3:00 PM	Wentworthville Magpies	Cronulla Sharks	Ringrose Park	32-12
Sun, 1 Sep	3:00 PM	Newcastle Knights	Wyong Roos	Newcastle No.2 Sprtsgrnd, NSW	48-16

Newtown Jets Bye

=== Round 26 ===
Date	Time	Home	Away	Venue	Result
Sat, 7 Sep	3:00 PM	North Sydney Bears	Auckland Vulcans	North Sydney Oval	48–6
Sat, 7 Sep	3:00 PM	Newtown Jets	Canterbury Bankstown Bulldogs	Henson Park	30-34
Sat, 7 Sep	3:00 PM	Mounties	Wests Tigers	Mt Pritchard Sports Ground	32-30
Sat, 7 Sep	6:00 PM	Windsor Wolves	Wyong Roos	Windsor Sports Complex	24-22
Sun, 8 Sep	3:00 PM	Newcastle Knights	Manly Sea Eagles	Newcastle No.2 Sprtsgrnd, NSW	56-10
Sun, 8 Sep	3:00 PM	Wentworthville Magpies	Illawarra Cutters	Ringrose Park	28–30

Cronulla Sharks Bye

== Player of the Year ==
Wyong Roos hooker Mitch Williams was named NSW Cup Player of the Year.

== Final Series Chart ==
Qualifying and elimination finals
Shark Park, Sat 14 Sep
1	Cronulla Sharks	22
4	Windsor Wolves	24
Leichhardt, Sun 15 Sep
5	Newtown Jets	40
8	Wentworthville Magpies	26
Shark Park, Sat 14 Sep
6	Auckland Vulcans	24
7	West Tigers	34
Leichhardt, Sun 15 Sep
2	Newcastle Knights	28
3	North Sydney Bears	32

Semi-finals
Leichhardt, Sun 22 Sep
Cronulla Sharks	54
Newtown Jets	18
Leichhardt, Sun 22 Sep
West Tigers	10
Newcastle Knights	38

Preliminary finals
Leichhardt, Sun 29 Sep
Windsor Wolves	36
Newcastle Knights	32
Leichhardt, Sun 29 Sep
Cronulla Sharks	38
North Sydney Bears	6

Grand final
ANZ Stadium, Sun 6 Oct
Windsor Wolves	8
Cronulla Sharks	36

== Grand Final ==
The Cronulla-Sutherland Sharks defeated the Windsor Wolves in the Grand Final. The Sharks were coached by Tony Herman and captained by Chad Townsend.

2013 NSW Cup Grand Final

Sunday, 6 October
13:50 AEDT (UTC+11)

Cronulla-Sutherland Sharks	36 – 8	Windsor Wolves
Tries: 6 Auva'a 59', 77'; Manumalealuii 19'; Peachey 24'; Lichaa 38'; Moors 62'; Goals: 6 Townsend (6/7)	1st: 18–8; 2nd: 18–0; Reports	Tries: 2 Nabuli 9', 31'; Goals: 0 Naiqama (0/2)

ANZ Stadium, Sydney
Referee: Zbigniew Przekiasa-Adamski

== Media ==
The 2013 Season was included as part of Fox Sports' Saturday Afternoon of Football. At the Start of the season it would kick off with the NSW cup, followed by the Holden Cup and then the NRL, however in round 23 the Holden cup and NSW cup were swapped and continued like this for the rest of the season.

== Ron Massey Cup ==
The 2013 Ron Massey Cup season was the third tier rugby league competition held in New South Wales, after the National Rugby League and New South Wales Cup.

Rank	Club	M	W	D	L	B	PF	PA	PD	Pts
1	Cabramatta Two Blues	22	17	0	5	0	753	442	+311	34
2	Mount Pritchard Mounties	22	16	1	5	0	775	437	+338	33
3	Wentworthville Magpies	22	15	0	7	0	830	445	+385	30
4	The Entrance Tigers	22	14	1	7	0	720	470	+250	29
5	Auburn Warriors	22	14	0	8	0	727	534	+193	28
6	Burwood North Ryde	22	11	0	11	0	624	572	+52	22
7	Windsor Wolves	22	10	1	11	0	601	566	+35	21
8	Western Suburbs Magpies	22	9	0	13	0	644	637	+7	18
9	Guildford Owls	22	9	0	13	0	565	734	-169	18
10	Blacktown Workers	22	8	0	14	0	576	824	-248	16
11	Asquith Magpies	22	7	1	14	0	550	726	-176	15
12	Kingsgrove Colts	22	0	0	22	0	324	1302	-978	0

=== Finals Series ===
Qualifying and elimination finals
New Era Stadium, Sat 7 Sep
1	Cabramatta Two Blues	16
4	The Entrance Tigers	21
New Era Stadium, Sat 7 Sep
5	Auburn Warriors	16
8	Western Suburbs	28
Ringrose Park, Sat 7 Sep
6	Burwood North Ryde	34
7	Windsor Wolves	24
Ringrose Park, Sat 7 Sep
2	Mounties	16
3	Wentworthville Magpies	22

Semi-finals
New Era Stadium, Sat 14 Sep
Cabramatta Two Blues	20
Western Suburbs Magpies	24
Lidcombe Oval, Sat 14 Sep
Burwood North Ryde	18
Mounties	20

Preliminary finals
Kogarah Jubilee, Sun 22 Sep
The Entrance Tigers	8
Mounties	48
Kogarah Jubilee, Sun 22 Sep
Western Suburbs Magpies	24
Wentworthville Magpies	32

Grand final
St Marys Stadium, Sat 28 Sep
Mounties	18
Wentworthville Magpies	32

=== Player of the Year ===
Dean Rysko from the Western Suburbs Magpies was named the Ron Massey Cup player of the year at the 2013 Brad Fittler Medal Night.

=== Grand Final ===
Wentworthville Magpies 32 (D.Penese 3, J.MacKenzie, A.Takapu, B.Waters tries; A.FIuke 4 goals) beat Mounties 18 (G.Lahey, A.Tuatuaa, F.Pakutoa, N.Kassis tries; B.Lahey goal) in the Ron Massey Cup grand final at St Marys Leagues Stadium on Saturday, September 28, 2013.

== Sydney Shield ==
The 2013 Sydney Shield season was the fourth tier rugby league competition held in New South Wales, after the National Rugby League, New South Wales Cup and Ron Massey Cup.
Eleven teams participated in the Sydney Shield competition.

- Asquith Magpies
- Auburn Warriors
- Belrose Eagles (Minor Premiers)
- Blacktown Workers (10th, two wins, one draw)
- Cabramatta Two Blues
- Guildford Owls
- Hills District Bulls
- Kingsgrove Colts (withdrew prior to the completion of the regular season).
- Mounties
- Wentworthville Magpies
- Windsor Wolves

=== Finals Series ===
The final series for the 2013 Sydney Shield was a top-five. This gave minor premiers, Belrose Eagles, a bye in the first week of the finals series.
Finals Week 1
Hills District Bulls beat Cabramatta Two Blues 30–14 at New Era Stadium on Saturday, September 7, 2013. Cabramatta were eliminated.
Wentworthville Magpies beat Mounties 76–22 at Ringrose Park.
Finals Week 2
Mounties beat Hills District Bulls 41–40, in golden-point extra time at Lidcombe Oval on Saturday, September 14, 2013. Hills District Bulls were eliminated.
Belrose Eagles beat Wentworthville Magpies 38–34.
Finals Week 3
Wentworthville Magpies beat Mounties 56–30 at Kogarah Jubilee Oval.

=== Player of the Year ===
Belrose Eagles fullback and captain-coach James Mortimer was named the Sydney Shield Player of the Year.

=== Grand Final ===
Belrose Eagles beat Wentworthville Magpies 30–26 at St Marys Leagues Stadium on Saturday, September 28, 2013. The Eagles were captain-coached by James Mortimer.
