= Ben McFadgean =

Australian rugby league footballer

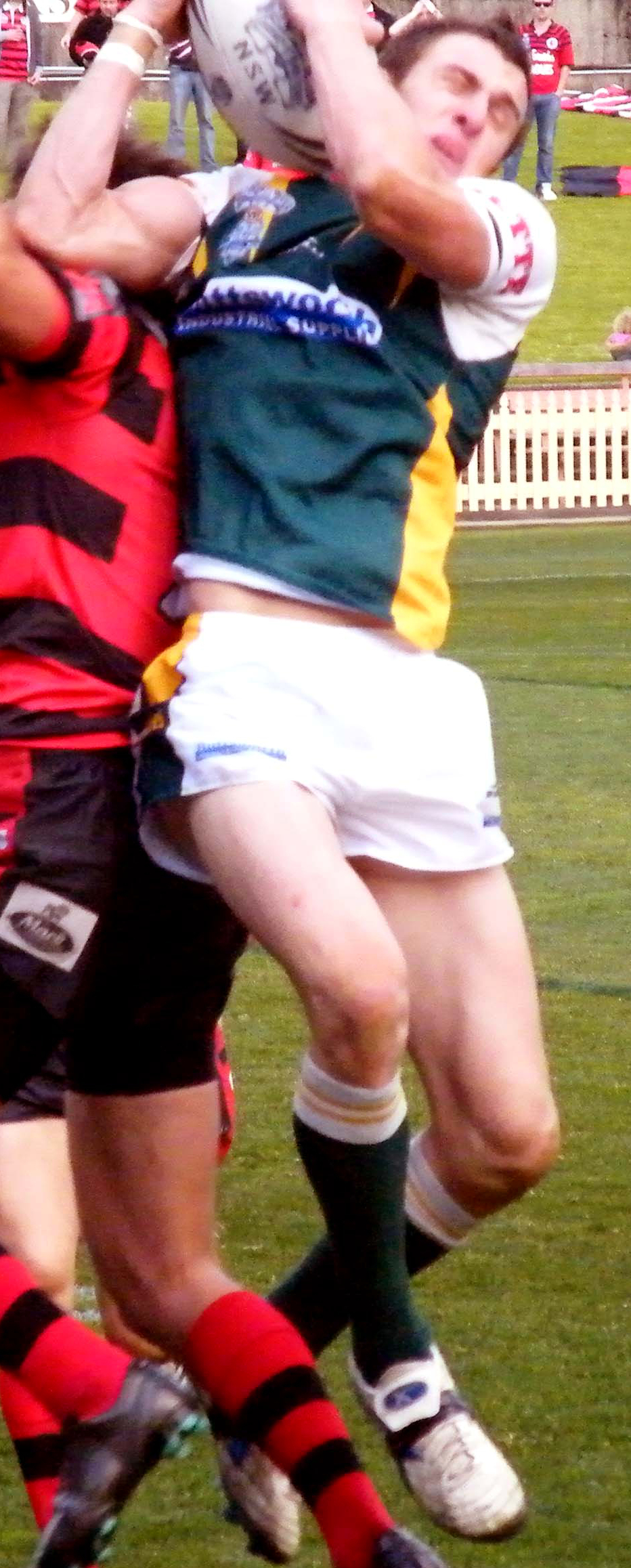

Personal information
- Born: 31 July 1986 (age 38); Windsor, New South Wales, Australia

Playing information
- Position: Wing
Club
Years	Team	Pld	T	G	FG	P
2009	Penrith Panthers	1	0	0	0	0

Ben McFadgean (/məkfædʒiːn/) (born 31 July 1986) is a former professional rugby league footballer who played on the wing for the Penrith Panthers in the NRL.

== Background ==
McFadgean was born Windsor, New South Wales, Australia.

== Playing career ==
McFadgean played his first and only game on round 18 in 2009.

He played for the New South Wales Residents team in 2009.

Other than the one first grade game, he played for Windsor Wolves in the NSWRL Jim Beam Cup.
