= Brothers Penrith =

Australian rugby league club, based in Penrith, NSW

Penrith Brothers RLFC

Club information
- Full name: Penrith Brothers Rugby League Football Club
- Colours: blue white
- Founded: 1968; 58 years ago
- Website: Club Website on facebook

Current details
- Ground: *Hickeys Lane (Saturday) *Nepean Rugby Park (Sunday)
- Competition: Penrith District Rugby League; Ron Massey Cup; Sydney Shield; NSWRL Women's Premiership

Records
- Premierships: 2024 Sydney Shield (1)
- Runners-up: 2022 Sydney Shield (1)
- Minor premierships: Nil
- Wooden spoons: 1 Third Tier, 2 Fourth Tier (2018, 2019 (RMC), 2018 (SS).)

Penrith Brothers Rugby League Football Club is an Australian rugby league football club based in Penrith, New South Wales which was formed in 1968. It was initially known as St. Dominics RLFC but was rebranded as Penrith Brothers RLFC in 2003. On 22 March 2018, it was announced that Brothers Penrith would be fielding a team to compete in The Ron Massey Cup competition taking the place of The Auburn Warriors who became defunct. They also began fielding a team in The Sydney Shield competition for the 2018 season.

== History ==
For the 2018 season, both of the Brothers Penrith teams in the Ron Massey Cup and Sydney Shield finished with the wooden spoon in their respective competitions with the Sydney Shield side winning only one game for the entire season. At the end of the 2019 season, Brothers Penrith finished last in the Ron Massey Cup for a second consecutive season. The Sydney Shield side avoided the wooden spoon finishing second last above the Belrose Eagles. On 4 September 2022, Brothers Penrith reached the 2022 Sydney Shield grand final but were defeated 36-12 by St Mary's. On 14 September 2024, Brothers Penrith won their first Sydney Shield title defeating Wentworthville 43-18 in the grand final which was played at Leichhardt Oval.

== Notable players ==
- Greg Alexander
- Mitchell Allgood
- Mark Carroll
- John Cartwright
- Nathan Cleary
- Garrett Crossman
- Kurt Falls
- Brad Fittler
- Des Hasler
- Clay Priest
- Luke Rooney
- Jesse Sene-Lefao
- Steve Turner

== Playing Record in NSWRL Competition ==
=== Fourth Tier ===
Year	Competition	Ladder			Finals Position	All Match Record						
Year	Competition	Pos	Byes	Pts	Finals Position	P	W	L	D	For	Agst	Diff
2018	Sydney Shield	11	2	7	Wooden Spoon	18	1	16	1	210	750	-540
2019	Sydney Shield	11	1	6		20	1	17	2	294	834	-540
2020	Sydney Shield	14	0	0	Competition Cancelled	1	0	1	0	6	59	-53

=== Third Tier ===
Year	Competition	Ladder			Finals Position	All Match Record						
Year	Competition	Pos	Byes	Pts	Finals Position	P	W	L	D	For	Agst	Diff
2009	Bundaberg Red Cup	6	0	20		18	10	8	0	431	425	6
2010	Bundaberg Red Cup	6	0	16		21	8	13	0	530	586	-56
2018	Ron Massey Cup	11	2	9	Wooden Spoon	18	2	15	1	326	642	-316
2019	Ron Massey Cup	11	2	10	Wooden Spoon	20	3	17	0	331	751	-420

== See also ==
- List of rugby league clubs in Australia
