= St Marys Saints =

Australian rugby league club, based in Penrith District, NSW

St Marys Saints RLFC

Club information
- Full name: St Marys Saints Rugby League Football Club
- Colours: Bottle Green; White
- Founded: 1908; 118 years ago

Current details
- Ground: St Marys Leagues Stadium
- CEO: Warren Smith
- Coach: Darren Baker
- Captain: Joe Vaegaau
- Competition: Penrith District Rugby League; Ron Massey Cup; Sydney Shield

Records
- Premierships: 3 Third Tier; 1 Fourth Tier (1993, 1994, 2001 (MC), 2017 (SS))
- Runners-up: 5 Third Tier; 1 Second Tier (1974, 2000 (MC), 2016, 2018, 2019 (RMC), 2003 (PL))
- Minor premierships: 2 Third Tier (2000 (MC), 2017 (RMC))

The St Marys Saints are an Australian rugby league club who were formed in 1908. They were the founding Member of the Penrith District Rugby League. They have previously competed in the NSWRL Jim Beam Cup, winning three titles in the 1990s and in the NSWRL Premier League/State League as a former joint-venture club with their local rivals, the Penrith Panthers from 2002 until 2007. For a brief time, the Saints were known as the Cougars in the NSWRL Jim Beam Cup. The club has since returned to its original name.

== History ==
=== Rugby Union Roots ===
The St Marys Rugby League Club evolved from the St Marys United Rugby Union Club in 1908 and is the oldest Rugby League Club in the Penrith District Rugby League. St Marys United RUFC would play Rugby Union on a Saturday and back up again on a Sunday and play Rugby League against teams from the Sydney Competition on the paddocks where the St Marys High School is situated today. Their first A Grade Premiership was won in the Western Districts Junior League Competition in 1945.

=== Early Competitions and Quick Success ===
In 1947 Parramatta entered the NSW Rugby League Competition and St Marys joined their Junior League, winning the A Grade Competition in 1957, 1961–1963 and 1965. They were also successful in winning the A Reserve Grade Competition in 1959 and again in 1964. Other successful teams were the D Grade, they won their first Premiership in 1957, and the F Grade won their Premiership in 1958 whilst the E Grade was successful in winning their competition in 1960.

=== Metro Cup ===
In 1967 St Marys became part of the Penrith Junior Rugby League when Penrith was accepted into the NSW Rugby League Competition. In 1970 just 3 years later St Marys entered teams in the Sydney 2nd Division Competition which was renamed the Metropolitan Cup in 1974 but the competition folded in 1976, the same year the Club won the Metropolitan Cup 2nd Grade Premiership. Because there was no Metropolitan Cup Competition in 1977 St Marys chose to enter teams in the Penrith Junior League winning their first ever A Grade Premiership in the Penrith Junior League the same year.

In 1991 the Club re-entered the Metropolitan Cup Competition again, which was reformed one year earlier, winning the First Grade Premierships in 1993–1994 and again in 2001, the club was also successful in winning the 2nd Grade Premiership in 1995. The next year the club decided that the Metropolitan Cup Competition had no direction; the competition was down to 7 teams and without any other teams interested in playing in the Metropolitan Cup Competition decided to withdraw its teams and concentrate on the Junior League.

=== Stadium issue ===
In 1950 the club was still based at their old oval, Victoria Park, but was advised by the Penrith City Council that it would be turning the oval into a Garden Park and there would be no room for the St Marys Rugby League Club. The club had now to decide on its immediate future as it had no choice but to look for another venue to play Rugby League and found a site where the Target Shopping Centre is situated today.

During 1995, unfortunately the Penrith Council were unable to find funds available so the St Marys Rugby League Club took it upon themselves to build a state of the art Rugby League Stadium at the rear of the club at a cost of $6.25m which was totally funded by the club, the Stadium was opened in January 2002.

=== Back in Topflight State Footy ===
In 2003 the club went in a new direction and joined the Penrith Panthers in a joint venture merging into one Club known as the St Marys/Penrith Cougars. Together they entered a team in the Jim Beam Cup and Premier League competition. The joint venture in the Jim Beam Cup only lasted until the end of the 2005 season with the Premier League venture finishing up a year later when the club was forced to withdraw its support because of the massive increase in poker machine tax and smoking restrictions. In spite of that the Junior League continues to become stronger especially over the past 10 years winning a record 11 Premierships in 2004 and again in 2007. On 26 September 2016, St Marys made the Ron Massey Cup Grand Final against Mount Pritchard Mounties but lost the match 36–16. On 24 September 2017, St Marys defeated Mounties to win the Sydney Shield competition in the grand final. In 2018, St Marys made the Ron Massey Cup grand final against defending premiers the Wentworthville Magpies but were defeated 38–4. In the 2019 Ron Massey Cup season, St Marys made the grand final against Wentworthville in a rematch from the previous seasons decider. St Marys would again lose in the grand final by a score of 32-14 at Leichhardt Oval. On 4 September 2022, St Marys won the 2022 Sydney Shield competition, defeating Brothers Penrith 36-12 in the grand final. On 3 September 2023, St Marys defeated Wentworthville 40-12 to win the Ron Massey Cup Grand Final. On 13 September 2025, St Marys defeated Wentworthville in the 2025 Ron Massey Cup grand final.

== Leagues Club ==
The club's future meant that they had to find a site for a Licensed Rugby league Club and started working to achieve that goal. In 1956 the dreams of many of the St Marys people came true, the present Club was incorporated by merging the both Leagues Club and Junior League into one body to be known as the St Marys Rugby League Football Club Ltd. Since then, on legal advice, the word football was deleted and the club is now known as the St Marys Rugby League Club Ltd. Originally the club was going to build its licensed premises where the Target Shopping Centre is located but was advised by the Club Solicitors to sell the property and seek a more suitable site. In 1980 the site was sold and after a lot of negotiating 30ha was purchased where the club is situated today. The club then applied for a liquor licence which was finally granted in March 1982.

The actual building was constructed by a company known as Rennat Construction in very quick time to allow the Club to open for trading on Melbourne Cup Day 1982. Twenty five years have passed and the club has had several renovations done since.

== Famous players ==
St Marys has produced numerous notable players such as Darren South (St George Dragons), Luke Swain (Penrith Panthers), Dave, and John Cartwright (Penrith Panthers), Bryce Cartwright (Parramatta Eels), Ben McFadgean, Frank Puletua, Tony Puletua (Penrith Panthers), Tim Grant (Wests Tigers), Michael Jennings (Parramatta Eels), Geoff Daniela (Penrith Panthers), Willie Isa (Wigan Warriors), Daniel Penese (Penrith Panthers), Sonny Tuigamala (Sydney Roosters), John Nuumaalii, Moses Leota (Penrith Panthers), Peter Wallace (Penrith Panthers), Tyrell Fuimaono (St George Illawarra Dragons), Brian To'o (Penrith Panthers), Christian Crichton (Canterbury-Bankstown Bulldogs)., Brent Naden (Wests Tigers), Stephen Crichton (Canterbury Bankstown Bulldogs), Jarome Luai (Wests Tigers) Sunia Turuva (Wests Tigers), Izack Tago (Penrith Panthers), Jake Tago (Parramatta Eels), Lindsay Smith (Penrith Panthers) and Liam Ison (Cronulla Sharks). Carlin Younes (Penrith Panthers)

== Honours ==
Ron Massey Cup

- Winners (5) 1993, 1994, 2001, 2023, 2025
- Minor Premiers (4) 2000, 2017, 2023, 2025

Sydney Shield

- Winners (2) 2017, 2022

Metropolitan Cup Reserve Grade

- Winners (2) 1976, 1995
- Minor Premiers (2) 1998, 2001

Western Districts Junior Rugby League 1908-1946

- A-Grade Winners (1) 1945

Parramatta Districts Junior Rugby League 1947-1966

- A-Grade Winners (5) 1957, 1961, 1962, 1963, 1965

Penrith Districts Junior Rugby League 1967-present

- A-Grade Winners (16) 1977, 1978, 1980, 1984, 1987, 1990, 1993, 1995, 1999, 2000, 2002, 2005, 2007, 2010, 2013, 2015

== Playing Record in NSWRL Competitions ==
=== Ron Massey Cup ===
St Marys entered the Ron Massey Cup in 2016. The club had previously entered equivalent third tier competitions in the 1970s and 1990s through to 2001, and 2003.

Year	Competition	Ladder			Finals Position	All Match Record						
Year	Competition	Pos	Byes	Pts	Finals Position	P	W	L	D	For	Agst	Diff
1970	Second Division	7	2	15		20	7	12	1	245	473	-228
1971	Second Division	6	2	16		20	12	8	0	382	338	44
1972	Second Division	10	2	12		20	4	16	0	257	537	-280
1973	Second Division	6	2	26		20	11	9	0	390	313	77
1974	Metropolitan Cup	2		29	Grand Finalist	24	15	8	1	429	364	65
1975	Metropolitan Cup	5	2	13		16	5	8	3	296	354	-58
1976	Metropolitan Cup	3	0	19	Semi-Finalist	17	9	7	1	339	275	64
1991	Metropolitan Cup			21	Semi-Finalist							
1992	Metropolitan Cup	5	2	20		16	8	8	0	309	255	54
1993	Metropolitan Cup	4	2	24	Premiers	19	14	5	0	375	325	50
1994	Metropolitan Cup	2	0	27	Premiers	23	15	7	1	622	409	213
1995	Metropolitan Cup	5	2	24		18	9	9	0	395	335	60
1996	Metropolitan Cup	7	2	10		16	2	12	2	258	542	-284
1997	Metropolitan Cup	6		10								
1998	Metropolitan Cup	4	0	23	Semi-Finalist	18	11	6	1	387	330	57
1999	Metropolitan Cup	2		27	Finalist	18	13	6	1	458	382	76
2000	Metropolitan Cup	1	0	20	Grand Finalist	17	10	5	2	458	368	90
2001	Metropolitan Cup	4	3	25	Premiers	21	12	8	1	489	438	51
2003	Jim Beam Cup	5	0	27	Elimination Semi	23	13	9	1	645	562	83
2016	Ron Massey Cup	4	2	30	Grand Finalist	23	15	8	0	704	501	203
2017	Ron Massey Cup	1	7	44	Last 4 Preliminary Finalist	20	16	4	0	740	343	397
2018	Ron Massey Cup	4	2	26	Grand Finalist	22	13	9	0	553	463	90
2019	Ron Massey Cup	2	2	38	Grand Finalist	23	19	4	0	776	424	352
2020	Ron Massey Cup	N/A	0	2	Competition Cancelled	1	1	0	0	44	32	12

=== Sydney Shield ===
Year	Competition	Ladder			Finals Position	All Match Record						
Year	Competition	Pos	Byes	Pts	Finals Position	P	W	L	D	For	Agst	Diff
2016	Sydney Shield	3	0	34	Last 4 Preliminary Finalist	24	18	6	0	831	548	283
2017	Sydney Shield	2	3	44	Premiers	26	22	4	0	904	561	343
2018	Sydney Shield	2	2	32	Last 6 Semi-Finalist	20	14	6	0	710	405	305
2019	Sydney Shield	2	1	33	Last 4 Preliminary Finalist	23	16	6	1	727	489	238
2020	Sydney Shield	N/A	0	2	Competition Cancelled	1	1	0	0	20	16	4

=== Premier League ===
In a joint venture with the Penrith Panthers during the mid 2000s, the club fielded a team, St Marys Penrith Cougars, in the second-tier Premier League.

Year	Competition	Ladder			Finals Position	All Match Record						
Year	Competition	Pos	Byes	Pts	Finals Position	P	W	L	D	For	Agst	Diff
2003	Premier League	5	0	28	Grand Finalist	26	17	9	0	750	536	214
2004	Premier League	5	2	33	Last 6 Semi-Finalist	26	14	11	1	693	613	80
2005	Premier League	11	2	21		26	8	15	1	538	573	-35
2006	Premier League	7	2	28	Top 8 Elimination Semi-Finalist	25	12	13	0	698	700	-2

== See also ==
- List of rugby league clubs in Australia
- Rugby league in New South Wales

== Sources ==
Years	Acronym	Item	Available Online	Via
1908 to 2007	-	Never a backward step: the story of St Mary's Rugby League Club	No	State Library of NSW
1920 to 1973	RLN	Rugby League News	Yes	Trove
1972–76, 1978, 1980–81, 1991–96, 1998–2009	-	New South Wales Rugby League Annual Report	No	State Library of NSW
2014–19	-	New South Wales Rugby League Annual Report	Yes	NSWRL website
1970 to 2002	RLW	Rugby League Week	No	State Library of NSW
2003 to 2014	RLW	Rugby League Week	Yes	eResources at State Library of NSW
1974 to 2019	BL	Big League	No	State Library of NSW
2014 to present	LU	League Unlimited	Yes	League Unlimited website
2010 to 2019	-	Various Newspaper Websites	Yes	As referenced
