= Sydney Shield =

Rugby competition

- Current season or competition: 2025 NSWRL Major Competitions
- Sport: Rugby league
- Instituted: 2012
- Inaugural season: 2012
- Number of teams: 10
- Region: Australia
- Premiers: St Marys Saints (2026)
- Most titles: East Campbelltown Eagles; St Marys Saints (3 titles)
- Website: Sydney Shield
- Related competition: NSW Cup; Ron Massey Cup; Presidents Cup; NSW Challenge Cup

The Sydney Shield is a rugby league football competition played in Sydney, New South Wales. The competition is administered by the New South Wales Rugby League.

== Clubs ==
Nine teams will compete in the 2026 Sydney Shield. The fixture list is available on the NSWRL website.

Colours	Club	Location	Home Ground	Premierships	Founded	Joined
	Blacktown Workers	Blacktown	H.E. Laybutt Fields	None	1964	2013
	Glebe Dirty Reds	Glebe, New South Wales	Wentworth Park	None	1908	2017
	Hills District Bulls	Baulkham Hills, New South Wales	Crestwood Oval	2023	1964	2012
	Moorebank Rams	Moorebank, New South Wales	Hammondville Oval	None	1955	2017
	Mount Pritchard Mounties	Mount Pritchard, New South Wales	Aubrey Keech Reserve	None	1927	2023
	Penrith Brothers	Penrith, New South Wales	Parker St Reserve	2024	1968	2018
	Ryde-Eastwood Hawks	Ryde, New South Wales	TG Milner Field	2019	1962	2019
	St Marys Saints	St Marys, New South Wales	St Marys Leagues Stadium	2017, 2022	1908	2016 (Note: Played in one Sydney Shield match in 2020, prior to the suspension of the competition due to the Covid-19 pandemic in Australia. Did not enter a team when the competition recommenced in July 2020.)
	Wentworthville Magpies	Wentworthville, New South Wales	Ringrose Park	2012, 2015	1963	2012

== Sydney Shield Premiers ==
Year	Premiers	Score	Runners-up	Minor Premiers	Wooden Spoon	Winning Coach	Winning Captain	Referee	Ref
2012	Wentworthville United	32 – 26	Cabramatta Two Blues	Wentworthville United		David Nugent	James Boustani	Liam Nicholls	
2013	Belrose Eagles	30 – 26	Wentworthville United	Belrose Eagles		James Mortimer	James Mortimer	Scot Murray	
2014	East Campbelltown Eagles	27 – 20	Mount Pritchard Mounties			Gary Potts		Chris Treneman	
2015	Wentworthville United	26 – 22	Hills District Bulls	Wentworthville United	Western Suburbs Magpies	Alex Chan	Simon Greaves	Damian Briscoe	
2016	East Campbelltown Eagles	32 – 24	Mount Pritchard Mounties	Mount Pritchard Mounties	Asquith Magpies	Richard Barnes	John Da Silva	Damian Briscoe	
2017	St Marys Saints	34 – 20	Mount Pritchard Mounties	Mount Pritchard Mounties	Moorebank Rams	Luke Swain		Damian Briscoe	
2018	East Campbelltown Eagles	32 – 22	Guildford Owls	East Campbelltown Eagles	Penrith Brothers	Richard Barnes	Mason Talolua	Keiren Irons	
2019	Ryde-Eastwood Hawks	22 – 12	Cabramatta Two Blues	Cabramatta Two Blues	Belrose Eagles	Walter Wilson	Angelo Panambalana	Damian Briscoe	
2020	Cronulla-Caringbah Sharks	32 – 30	Ryde-Eastwood Hawks	Ryde-Eastwood Hawks	Wentworthville United	Stephen Kelly	Tokerau Raru		
2021	Competition suspended and subsequently cancelled due to lockdown measure put in place to mitigate the risks of the COVID-19 pandemic in New South Wales.								
2022	St Marys Saints	36 – 12	Penrith Brothers	St Marys Saints	Wentworthville United	Glenn Jones		Daniel Luttringer	
2023	Hills District Bulls	34 – 30	St Marys Saints	St Marys Saints	Moorebank Rams	Matt Kelly	Dylan Marshall	Daniel Luttringer	
2024	Penrith Brothers	43 – 18	Wentworthville United	Wentworthville United	Moorebank Rams	Brad Vaughan	Sia Sisifa	Martin Jones	
2025	Manly Leagues	25 – 24	Wentworthville United	Wentworthville United	Moorebank Rams	Frank McKee	Nicholas Bilsborough	Luke Saldern	
2026	St Marys Saints	32 – 26	Mount Pritchard Mounties	St Marys Saints	Moorebank Rams	Brad Drew	Atonio Pelesasa	Brendan Mani	

== Premiership Tally ==
No.	Club	Premierships
1	East Campbelltown Eagles	**3** (2014, 2016, 2018)
1	**St Mary's Saints**	**3** (2017, 2022, **2026**)
3	**Wentworthville Magpies**	**2** (2012, 2015)
4	Belrose Eagles	**1** (2013)
4	**Ryde-Eastwood Hawks**	**1** (2019)
4	Cronulla-Caringbah Sharks	**1** (2020)
4	**Hills District Bulls**	**1** (2023)
4	**Penrith Brothers**	**1** (2024)
4	Manly Leagues	**1** (2025)

Bold means the team still currently plays in the competition.

== Timeline ==
The timeline below displays club participation in the Sydney Shield competition. Finals Series have been: Top 5 (2013, 2022-23), Top 8 (2014-19) and Top 4 (2020). The competition was cancelled in 2021 prior to the scheduled final series.

== Previous Season Notes ==
=== 2021 ===
Eleven teams competed in the 2021 Sydney Shield. The season commenced on March 14, 2021. The last round was scheduled for August 22, 2021, with a final series to follow. The season was, however, suspended due to lockdown measures taken to combat the spread of the delta variant of the COVID-19 pandemic in New South Wales.

The eleven teams were: Belrose Eagles (2013-21), Cabramatta Two Blues (2020-21), Cronulla-Caringbah Sharks (2020-21), East Campbelltown Eagles (2014-21), Hills District Bulls (2013-21), Moorebank Rams, Penrith Brothers, Ryde-Eastwood Hawks, St Marys Saints, Wentworthville Magpies, and Windsor Wolves (2015-16, 2020-21)

=== 2020 ===
Due to the COVID-19 pandemic in Australia the Sydney Shield competition was postponed after the first round on March 14 & 15. The competition was subsequently reconfigured. Nominations from the following clubs were accepted. Results from the matches in March were disregarded as the competition restarted on July 18.

The teams that contested the revised competition were: Belrose Eagles, Cronulla-Caringbah Sharks (Premiers), East Campbelltown Eagles, Helensburgh Tigers, Hills District Bulls, Moorebank Rams, Ryde-Eastwood Hawks, Sydney University and Wentworthville Magpies.

Cronulla-Caringbah and Helensburgh were not in the first version of the 2020 Sydney Shield. The following teams had competed in the single, first round in March.

- Asquith Magpies (lost 16-20)
- Blacktown Workers Sea Eagles (won 24-10)
- Cabramatta Two Blues (lost 16-28)
- Penrith Brothers (lost 6-59)
- St Marys Saints (won 20-16)
- Windsor Wolves (lost 10-24)

=== 2019 ===
In 2019, twelve clubs fielded teams in the Sydney Shield:

- East Campbelltown Eagles
- St Marys Saints
- Moorebank Rams
- Wentworthville Magpies
- Asquith Magpies
- Cabramatta Two Blues
- Guildford Owls
- Blacktown Workers Sea Eagles
- Belrose Eagles
- Hills District Bulls
- Penrith Brothers
- Sydney University

=== 2017 ===
Three clubs that competed in the 2016 season did not enter teams in 2017: The Auburn Warriors, Peninsula Seagulls and Windsor Wolves. For the first time, the Moorebank Rams Rugby League club entered a team in the Sydney Shield. In 2018, Brothers Penrith were introduced into the Sydney Shield competition. In 2019, former New South Wales Rugby League premiership side University entered the Sydney Shield.

The competition began on the weekend on March 4 & 5, 2017. The regular season concluded with Round 25 on the weekend of August 25, 26 & 27 (Friday to Sunday). A four-week finals series followed in September 2017.

== See also ==
- Canterbury Cup NSW
- Ron Massey Cup
- President's Cup
- NSW Challenge Cup
- Rugby League Competitions in Australia
