= Campbelltown Eagles =

Australian rugby league club, based in Campbelltown, NSW

East Campbelltown Eagles

Club information
- Full name: East Campbelltown Eagles Rugby League Football Club
- Nickname: The Eagles
- Short name: East Campbelltown Eagles
- Colours: White; Red
- Founded: 1961; 65 years ago

Current details
- Ground: Waminda Oval, Campbelltown, New South Wales
- Coach: Daniel Milford
- Competition: Wests Group Macarthur First Grade Premiership
- 2025: 8th

Records
- Premierships: 6 (2001, 2007, 2012, 2014, 2016, 2018)
- Runners-up: 1 (2011)
- Minor premierships: 3 (2001, 2012, 2018)
- Wooden spoons: 1 (2004)

East Campbelltown Eagles are an Australian Junior Rugby League Club that also supports a semi-professional rugby league team. The team previously competed in the Western Suburbs 1st Grade competition, Canterbury 1st Grade competition, Jim Beam Cup, Bundaberg Red Cup, the Wests Juniors/Group 6 combined competition, Group 6 CRL Competition and now the West Group Macarthur First Grade Premiership

== History ==
The East Campbelltown Eagles RLFC was established in 1961 as a junior Rugby League club from the Campbelltown East Primary School. Starting with the colors Red and White which came from the local bus company situated on Broughton Street. The Club had a full Red jersey with white saddles on their shoulders, a big letter E on the heart side of the jersey, white shorts and striped socks. East Campbelltown was originally part of the Group 6 Country Rugby League. The Club's first home ground was Orana Park Leumeah from 1961 until 1968, Orana Park is now the Campbelltown Sports Stadium. Land on 32 Waminda Avenue was donated to the local Rugby League Club which was a small cattle farm. The majority of the houses around the East Campbelltown Area originally were chicken farms that was given to serviceman returning from World War 1 back in 1918.

The East Campbelltown Rugby League Club then moved to the new ground on Waminda Avenue, the name Waminda is an Aboriginal word for Comrade, which obviously came from the returned service men living in the area. East Campbelltown was also originally called the Settlement. Protest from the locals in the 60’s seen a name change to East Campbelltown as they thought the Settlement name was more of a name for a penal colony.

The E displayed on the East Campbelltown had opposition clubs calling the E for easy beats. The East Campbelltown President Mr E.W Lardner wanted to put a stop to the Easy Beats Tag and designed an Eagle. He then had the Eagles sown on all the jerseys with the name change to East Campbelltown Eagles in 1969. This also coincided with the move to Waminda Oval from Oranan Park in 1969.

The 1970s, East Campbelltown Eagles were a junior club that fielded teams from Under 6's to Under 16's. All players once past the age of 16 would then go and play for the senior club Campbelltown City Kangaroos. Campbelltown City had some successful years in the early 80’s that contributed from many East Campbelltown Eagles Junior players.

By the late 1970s, the East Campbelltown Eagles club came to life being the largest Junior Rugby League Club in the District and winning the Coca-Cola Knockout in 1977 and 1979, but it wasn’t all smooth sailing for East Campbelltown Eagles in the 70’s. A break away club named Leumeah Wolves formed on Waminda Oval field number 2. They wore the Blue and White Bulldogs strip, this gave the East Campbelltown Eagles club unwanted competition for local players.

Waminda Oval had gone through a few changes, the top field was fenced and a cricket pitch added, it wasn’t in favour for the Rugby League Club. The original farm house was demolished and made way for the current East Campbelltown Community Hall and the last house on Brisbane Avenue that backed onto Waminda Oval had the club wanting to buy it for a mere $7,000 but opposition from a Local Club wouldn’t allow the sale to go ahead.

By the end of 1979 East Campbelltown Eagles with a team full of 17 year olds asked permission to Group 6 CRL for a special exemption to field an Under 18's team. To Campbelltown City's disproval it was granted for a team coached by Don Young that became East Campbelltown’s first ever Under 18’s team in 1980. The team against all odds defeated arch rivals Campbelltown Collegians in the Grand Final at Bradbury Oval in 1980.

In 1980 East Campbelltown Eagles fielded 18 teams and won an amazing 8 Premierships, they had also won the Group 6 Junior Club Champions.

The end of 1983 seen the end of Group 6 in Campbelltown as Campbelltown was now seen as a small city and no longer part of the Country Rugby League. The competition was separated from what they called the water line, which was the convict built water canal that ran from the cataract dam through Narellan Road to the back of St Andrews Road, sides North-Wests of the water line were required to form the Newtown-Campbelltown Jets Rugby League, financial issues from Newtown Jets seen another Name change to Campbelltown Hornets in 1985 before the Western Suburbs Magpies District Rugby League was formed in 1986. The late 1980s to the early 1990s the club struggled sharing Waminda Oval with Leumeah Wolves which was a blue and white club that broke away from the East Campbelltown Club in 1978. When Leumeah Wolves folded in 1993 and East Campbelltown Eagles formed their senior base with now an Under 18's reserve Grade and 1st Grade they became the heavy weight club they were known for in the 70's, in many Semi final and Final 1st Grade appearances they couldn't crack that illusive Premiership until the 2001 season which was an important year for the Eagles, winning the Minor Premiership, Premiership, Senior Club Champions and Overall Club Champions, and to kick start the club's two decades of dominance at a Senior Level. The demise of the 1st Grade competition locally seen the East Campbelltown Eagles take on the best from the Canterbury District in 2007, The Eagles winning their second 1st Grade Premiership defeating Canterbury's prestigious club St Christopher's 19-12 under the coach Daniel Draper and Richard Barnes.

In 2008, the Eagles gained acceptance into the NSWRL Jim Beam Cup. Where they were the first Campbelltown side to compete in such a high level competition. The Eagles re-joined the combined Group 6-Westerns Suburbs District A-grade competition at the start of the 2009 season, where they started to dominate the competition winning the Grand Final in the Under 18's featuring NRL star Tim Lafai. That year they also made the Grand Final in Reserve Grade and 3rd Grade Competition.

By the 2011 season, the club had become a strong competitor and finished the regular season with only one loss, although it was defeated in the Grand Final. The club’s Reserve Grade team also had a successful season, winning the premiership undefeated under captain-coach Daniel Draper. During this period, a local rivalry with Campbelltown City re-emerged, and East Campbelltown Eagles remained undefeated against Campbelltown City in first-grade matches.

In 2012, The East Campbelltown Eagles went through the competition undefeated winning the Group 6 Grand Final with ease 44-6 and were named winners of the CRL Clayton's Cup and were the first Campbelltown Side to win the prestigious award. They had further success again winning the Reserve Grade competition and by 2013 the club had become a formidable powerhouse that wasn't excepted well with the Group 6 Management as the Club was voted out of the competition.

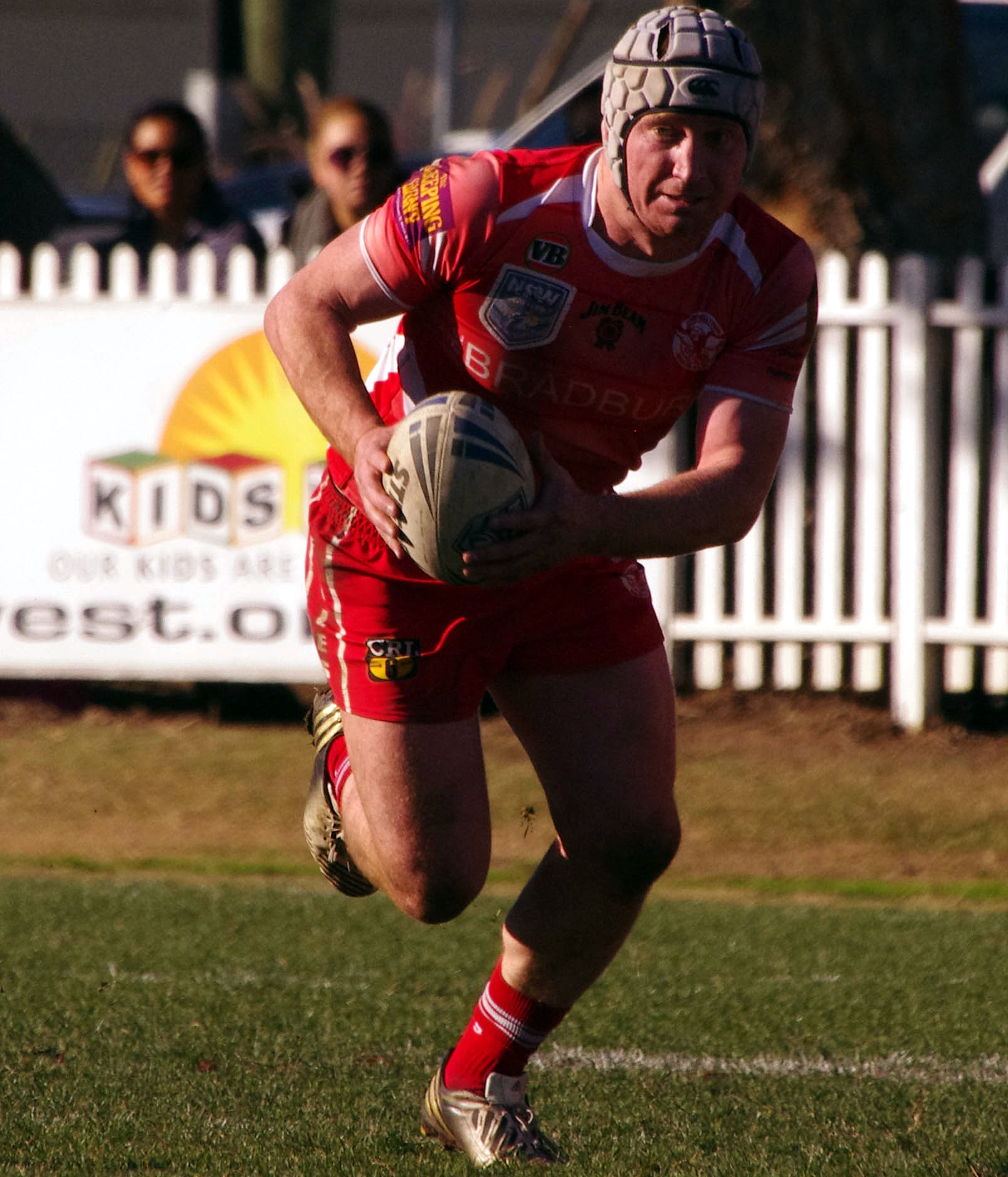
Sam Hoare in action for the Campbelltown Eagles

In 2014, the Eagles had gone from rags to riches as they won the NSWRL Sydney Shield competition, going in as huge underdogs against the Mount Pritchard Mounties, the Eagles went on to win the match and the premiership.

In 2016, East Campbelltown won the Sydney Shield for a second time defeating Mounties in one of the all time upsets as Mounties went into the Grand Final winning 21 games straight. In 2018, East Campbelltown won the Sydney Shield for a third time defeating the Guildford Owls 32-22 at Leichhardt Oval.

== Team emblem and homeground ==
East Campbelltown's logo is that of a red and white eagle inside a ring with the words "Campbelltown Eagles R.L.F.C" written on it. This logo is similar to the former emblem of NSWRL side, Manly Sea Eagles, with the colours changed to suit the club. The colours of the Eagles' jerseys are also red and white like their emblem.

The Eagles homeground in Waminda Oval, Campbelltown.

== Notable players ==
Notable NRL and NSW Cup Players that have played at East Campbelltown Eagles & Campbelltown Eagles include:

- Jarryd Hayne (2006-14 Parramatta Eels, 2015 San Francisco 49ers)
- Peni Tagive (2008-12 West Tigers, St George Illawarra Dragons & Sydney)
- Tallyn Da Silva (2025- Parramatta Eels)
- Terrell Kalo Kalo (2022- South Sydney Rabbitohs)
- Tim Lafai (Canterbury-Bankstown Bulldogs, St George Illawarra Dragons & Salford Red Devils)
- Roy Friend, Cronulla Sharks
- Lachlan Galvin, Wests Tigers 2024-2025, Canterbury-Bankstown Bulldogs 2025-
- Kit Laulilii (2023-26 Wests Tigers, 2027- Perth Bears)
- Luke Laulilii (2024–26 Wests Tigers, 2027– Perth Bears)
- Albert Hopoate (rugby league, born 1985) (2008 Sydney Roosters

== Playing Record in NSWRL Competitions ==
=== Tier 4 - Sydney Shield ===
Year	Competition	Ladder			Finals Position	All Match Record						
Year	Competition	Pos	Byes	Pts	Finals Position	P	W	L	D	For	Agst	Diff
2014	Sydney Shield	3	0	30	Premiers	23	15	6	2	833	660	173
2015	Sydney Shield	6	2	27	Top 8 Elimination Semi-Finalist	21	11	9	1	606	476	130
2016	Sydney Shield	5	0	26	Premiers	26	17	9	0	827	614	213
2017	Sydney Shield	6	3	32	Last 6 Semi-Finalist	24	14	10	0	683	660	23
2018	Sydney Shield	1	2	35	Premiers	22	18	3	1	732	380	352
2019	Sydney Shield	3	1	32	Last 4 Preliminary Finalist	22	16	6	0	826	432	394
2020	Sydney Shield	1	0	2	Competition Cancelled	1	1	0	0	59	6	53
2020	Sydney Shield	8	1	5		8	1	6	1	130	220	-90

=== Tier 3 ===
The club competed as Campbelltown Eagles in third tier competitions from 2008 to 2010 (the Jim Beam and Bundaberg Red Cups).

Year	Competition	Ladder			Finals Position	All Match Record						
Year	Competition	Pos	Byes	Pts	Finals Position	P	W	L	D	For	Agst	Diff
2008	Jim Beam Cup	11	0	11		22	5	16	1	505	718	-213
2009	Bundaberg Red Cup	8	0	12		18	6	12	0	432	480	-48
2010	Bundaberg Red Cup	8	0	14		20	7	13	0	561	596	-35
