= Moorebank Rams =

Australian semi-professional rugby league club, based in Moorebank, NSW

Club information
- Full name: Moorebank Rugby League Football Club
- Colours: Blue; White
- Founded: 1955; 71 years ago
- Website: On Facebook

Current details
- Ground: Hammondville Oval
- Competition: Sydney Shield; Sydney Metropolitan Conference Competitions
- Wooden spoons: 3 Third Tier (1994, 1998, 1999 (MC))

The Moorebank Rugby League Football Club is an Australian rugby league football club based in Moorebank, New South Wales. They currently play in the semi-professional Sydney Shield. The club also fields open age (men and women) and under age (boys and girls) teams in Sydney Metropolitan Combined Conference Competitions. Younger age club teams (Under 6' to Under 12) participate in the Canterbury-Bankstown Junior Rugby League.

== Playing Record in NSWRL Competitions ==
=== Sydney Shield ===
Year	Competition	Ladder			Finals Position	All Match Record						
Year	Competition	Pos	Byes	Pts	Finals Position	P	W	L	D	For	Agst	Diff
2017	Sydney Shield	12	3	14		22	4	18	0	458	778	-320
2018	Sydney Shield	3	2	30	Last 4 Preliminary Finalist	18	12	4	2	676	384	292
2019	Sydney Shield	6	1	24	Last 6 Semi-Finalist	20	11	9	0	727	492	235
2020	Sydney Shield	N/A	0	0	Competition Cancelled	1	0	1	0	8	50	-42
2020	Sydney Shield	6	1	9		8	3	4	1	178	158	20
2022	Sydney Shield	6	3	16		16	5	12	1	302	480	-178
2023	Sydney Shield	9	2	10	Wooden Spoon	16	3	13	0	301	566	-265

=== Metropolitan Cup ===
Moorebank participated in the Metropolitan Cup during the 1990s.

Year	Competition	Ladder			Finals Position	All Match Record						
Year	Competition	Pos	Byes	Pts	Finals Position	P	W	L	D	For	Agst	Diff
1992	Metropolitan Cup	3	2	23	Semi-Finalist	17	9	7	1	251	276	-25
1993	Metropolitan Cup	3	2	24	Semi-Finalist	17	9	6	2	305	268	37
1994	Metropolitan Cup	8	0	11	Wooden Spoon	21	5	15	1	313	458	-145
1995	Metropolitan Cup	6	2	20		18	7	11	0	321	379	-58
1996	Metropolitan Cup	5	2	22		16	9	7	0	353	276	77
1997	Metropolitan Cup	5		14								
1998	Metropolitan Cup	8	0	6	Wooden Spoon	18	3	15	0	300	563	-263
1999	Metropolitan Cup	8		7	Wooden Spoon	17	3	13	1	309	612	-303

== Sources ==
Years	Acronym	Item	Available Online	Via
1972–76, 1978, 1980–81, 1991–96, 1998–2009	-	New South Wales Rugby League Annual Report	No	State Library of NSW
2014–19	-	New South Wales Rugby League Annual Report	Yes	NSWRL website
1970 to 2002	RLW	Rugby League Week	No	State Library of NSW
2003 to 2014	RLW	Rugby League Week	Yes	eResources at State Library of NSW
1974 to 2019	BL	Big League	No	State Library of NSW
2014 to present	LU	League Unlimited	Yes	League Unlimited website
2010 to 2019	-	Various Newspaper Websites	Yes	As referenced
