= Cabramatta Two Blues =

Australian rugby league club, based in Cabramatta, NSW

Cabramatta Rugby League Football Club

Club information
- Full name: Cabramatta Two Blues Rugby League Football Club
- Nickname: Cabra
- Colours: Sky blue Navy blue
- Founded: 1919; 107 years ago

Current details
- Ground: Cabramatta Sports Ground
- Coach: Jim Bransby Sydney Shield
- Competition: Parramatta Rugby League; Sydney Shield; NSWRL Women's Premiership

Cabramatta Two Blues, colloquially known as Cabra, is an Australian rugby league football club that was originally formed in 1919 and then later completely formed as the Two Blues in 1939. They have always based from the Parramatta Junior Leagues, and their junior teams compete in the Parramatta District Junior Rugby League Association. They competed in the Sydney Shield and have previously competed in the Ron Massey Cup however both sides did not field a side for the 2022 season in either competition. They play out of the Cabramatta, New South Wales, Sports Ground Complex which can fit up to 5,000 spectators. The Two Blues have won numerous A-Grade Titles with their last Premiership received in 2002.

== Ron Massey Cup ==
In 2011, Cabramatta won their first Ron Massey Cup in the final against Mount Pritchard Mounties. In 2013, Cabramatta finished as minor premiers but failed to win the premiership that year. In 2018, Cabramatta finished 3rd on the table at the end of the 2018 Ron Massey Cup season. The Two Blues advanced to the preliminary final before being defeated 34-20 by St Mary's.

In 2025, Cabramatta returned to both the Ron Massey Cup and Sydney Shield however they would pull both of their sides from respective competitions due to funding issues.

=== Playing Record ===
Sources: Rugby League Week, Big League, NSWRL Rugby League News, Sydney Morning Herald, Daily Telegraph (Sydney). The win–loss–draw record in the table below does not include Finals Series matches.

Year	Competition	Pos	Plyd	W	L	D	B	For	Agst	Diff	Pts	Finals Position
2004	Jim Beam Cup	4	20	12	7	1	2	686	458	228	29	Elimination Semi-Finalist
2005	Jim Beam Cup	6	19	9	6	4	3	517	432	85	24	
2006	Jim Beam Cup	2	16	11	5	0	2	388	283	105	26	Finalist
2007	Jim Beam Cup	1	22	17	4	1	0	710	394	316	35	Grand Finalist
2008	Jim Beam Cup	4	22	14	7	1	0	686	508	178	29	Elimination Semi-Finalist
2009	Bundaberg Red Cup	3	18	11	6	2	0	506	344	162	24	Grand Finalist
2010	Bundaberg Red Cup	7	21	7	13	1	0	528	613	-85	15	
2011	Bundaberg Red Cup	1	21	18	3	0	0	768	295	473	36	Premiers
2012	Bundaberg Red Cup	5	18	12	5	1	0	580	362	218	25	Finalist
2013	Ron Massey Cup	1	22	17	5	0	0	753	442	311	34	Last 6 Semi-Finalist
2014	Ron Massey Cup	5	22	12	9	1	0	666	643	23	25	Top 8 Elimination Semi-Finalist
2015	Ron Massey Cup	10	20	8	12	0	2	586	563	23	20	
2016	Ron Massey Cup	11	20	8	12	0	2	452	608	-156	20	
2017	Ron Massey Cup	9	18	4	14	0	7	376	596	-220	22	
2018	Ron Massey Cup	3	18	10	5	3	2	536	346	190	27	Last 4 Preliminary Finalist
2019	Ron Massey Cup	7	20	9	11	0	2	372	430	-58	22	Grand Finalist
2020	Ron Massey Cup	N/A	1	0	1	0	0	14	18	-4	0	Competition Cancelled

== Sydney Shield ==
At the end of the regular season in the 2019 Sydney Shield competition, Cabramatta finished as minor premiers only losing 3 games in the process. Cabramatta then reached the 2019 Sydney Shield grand final after defeating defending premiers East Campbelltown Eagles 42–16 at Kogarah Oval.

In the 2019 Sydney Shield grand final against Ryde-Eastwood, Cabramatta were defeated 22–12 at Leichhardt Oval.

== Notable Juniors ==
Notable First Grade Players that have played at Cabramatta Two Blues include:

- Geoff Gerard (1974–89 Parramatta Eels, Manly & Penrith Panthers)
- David Riolo (1990–98 Parramatta Eels & Illawarra Steelers)
- Shane O'Grady (1991–93 Newcastle Knights, Penrith & Balmain)
- Peter Clarke (1993–99 Manly, Sydney Roosters, Adelaide Rams & South Sydney)
- Pat Richards (2000–15 Parramatta Eels, Wests & Wigan)
- Justin Tsoulos (2003–08 Parramatta Eels & Canterbury-Bankstown Bulldogs)
- Jarryd Hayne (2006–18 Parramatta Eels & Gold Coast Titans)
- Krisnan Inu (2007–21 Parramatta Eels, New Zealand Warriors, Canterbury-Bankstown Bulldogs, Catalans Dragons, Widnes Vikings, Salford Red Devils & Leigh)
- Blake Green (2007–21 Parramatta Eels, Cronulla, Canterbury, Hull Kingston Rovers Wigan Warriors, Manly, Melbourne Storm, New Zealand Warriors)
- Tony Williams (2008–18 Parramatta Eels, Manly, Canterbury & Cronulla-Sutherland Sharks)
- Kris Keating (2008–14 Parramatta Eels, Hull Kingston Rovers & Canterbury-Bankstown Bulldogs)
- Grant Millington (2008– Cronulla, Canterbury & Castleford Tigers)
- Brendan Oake (2008–10 Parramatta Eels)
- Matt Keating (2008–13 Parramatta Eels)
- Nathan Gardner (2010–14 Cronulla-Sutherland Sharks)
- Trent Hodkinson (2010–19 Manly, Newcastle Knights & Canterbury-Bankstown Bulldogs)
- Jacob Loko (2011–18 Parramatta Eels, Canterbury-Bankstown Bulldogs)
- Francis Vaiotu (2011 Sydney Roosters)
- Nathan Brown (2013– Parramatta Eels, Wests Tigers & South Sydney)
- Kelepi Tanginoa (2013–21 Parramatta Eels, North Queensland Cowboys, Manly-Warringah Sea Eagles & Wakefield Trinity)
- Kaysa Pritchard (2013–18 Parramatta Eels)
- Junior Paulo (2014– Parramatta Eels & Canberra Raiders)
- Jacob Gagan (2014–19 Cronulla-Sutherland Sharks, Newcastle Knights, South Sydney)
- Danny Fualalo (2015–19 Canterbury-Bankstown Bulldogs)
- Troy Dargan (2020 South Sydney Rabbitohs)
- Stefano Utoikamanu (2020– Parramatta Eels, Wests Tigers, Melbourne Storm)
- Matt Doorey (2020– Canterbury-Bankstown Bulldogs, Parramatta Eels)
- Bradley Deitz (2021 Canterbury-Bankstown Bulldogs)
- Trey Mooney (2022– Canberra Raiders)
- Blaize Talagi (2024- Parramatta Eels, Penrith Panthers)
- Sione Fonua (2025- Penrith Panthers)

== Honours ==
- Ron Massey Cup Premiers:

2011

- Ron Massey Cup Minor Premiers:

2013

- Sydney Shield Minor Premiers:

2019

== See also ==
- List of rugby league clubs in Australia
- Rugby league in New South Wales

== Sources ==
Years	Acronym	Item	Available Online	Via
1991–96, 1998–2009	-	New South Wales Rugby League Annual Report	No	State Library of NSW
2014–19	-	New South Wales Rugby League Annual Report	Yes	NSWRL website
2003 to 2014	RLW	Rugby League Week	Yes	eResources at State Library of NSW
1974 to 2019	BL	Big League	No	State Library of NSW
2010 to 2019	-	Various Newspaper Websites	Yes	As referenced
