= Belrose Eagles =

Australian rugby league club, based near Sydney NSW

Club information
- Full name: Belrose Eagles
- Colours: Red; Yellow; Black
- Founded: 1955; 71 years ago

Current details
- Ground: French's Forest Showground
- Coach: Tim Gee
- Competition: Sydney Shield
- 2020: 3rd (Semi-Finalist)

Records
- Premierships: 1 (2013)
- Wooden spoons: 1 (2019)

The Belrose Eagles are a rugby league team based in the suburb of Belrose in Sydney's Northern Beaches. Founded in 1955, the club has fielded both junior and senior teams in the Manly-Warringah district competitions and since 2013 the semi-professional Sydney Shield competition in NSW, Australia. Their colours are red and gold. After returning to the A Grade competition in 2009, the Belrose Eagles were 2009 Premiers.

In 2013, Belrose joined the Sydney Shield competition and in their inaugural year claimed the premiership. Belrose were also Premiers in the A2 Manly Warringah Rugby League Competition that year.

== Notable Juniors ==
Manly Warringah Sea Eagles legends Geoff Toovey and Jason King (rugby league) represented Belrose in their youth.

Belrose are part of the Manly-Warringah/North Sydney District Rugby League district competition.

== Jim Beam Cup ==
The Belrose Eagles played in the NSWRL Jim Beam Cup from 2005 until 2009. Prior to this the highest level of competition for the club was in the Manly-Warringah and North Sydney district A-Grade competitions. The Eagles did not make the finals of the Jim Beam Cup competition in any of the four years they participated. The Belrose Eagles returned to the Manly-Warringah/North Sydney district A-Grade competition in 2009 and went on to win this competition.

Year	Competition	Ladder			Finals Position	All Match Record						
Year	Competition	Pos	Byes	Pts	Finals Position	P	W	L	D	For	Agst	Diff
2005	Jim Beam Cup	9	3	16		19	6	11	2	537	499	38
2006	Jim Beam Cup	7	2	15		16	5	10	1	320	396	-76
2007	Jim Beam Cup	6	0	28		22	13	7	2	596	540	56
2008	Jim Beam Cup	8	0	18		22	9	13	0	570	576	-6

== Sydney Shield ==
Belrose compete in the NSW Sydney Shield competition. At the end of the 2019 Sydney Shield season, Belrose finished last on the table and claimed the wooden spoon. It was a difficult year for Belrose as they managed only one victory and lost eighteen matches. In 2020, Belrose competed in the two iterations of the Sydney Shield: a single round in mid-March that was cancelled due to the COVID-19 pandemic in Australia and a reorganised competition that ran from July to September 2020.

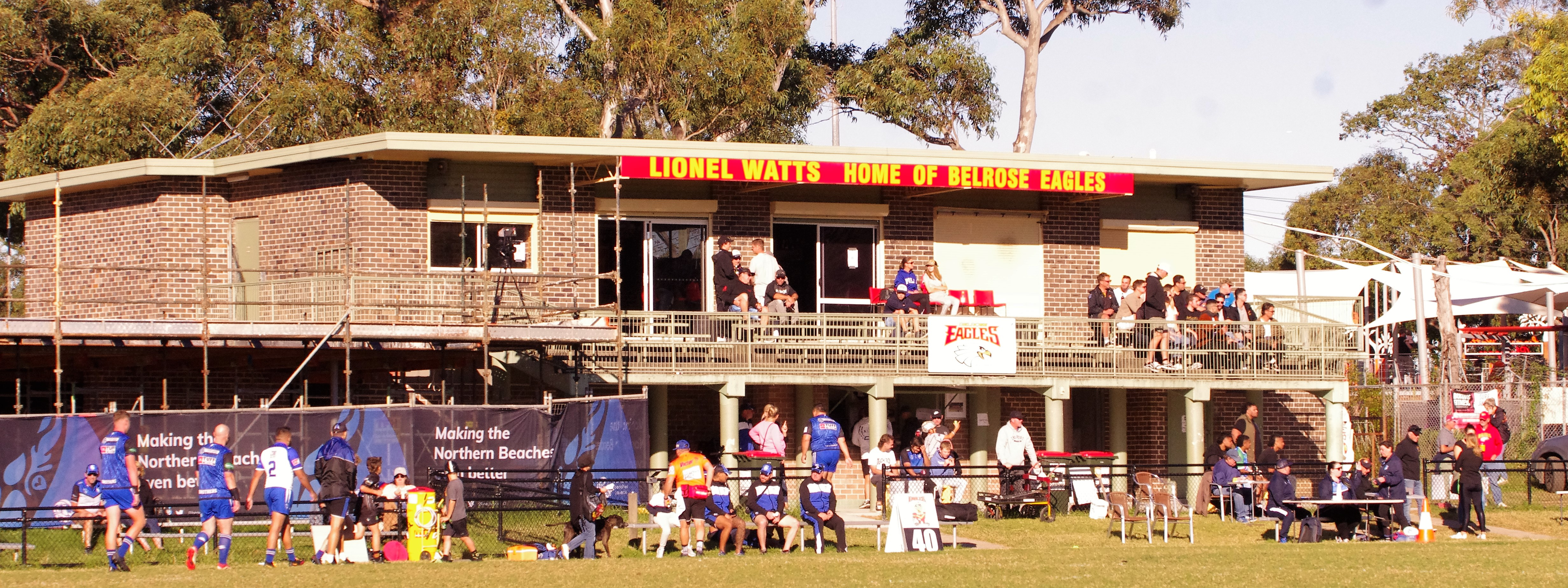
Lionel Watts Reserve, the home of the Belrose Eagles

Year	Competition	Ladder			Finals Position	All Match Record						
Year	Competition	Pos	Byes	Pts	Finals Position	P	W	L	D	For	Agst	Diff
2013	Sydney Shield				Premiers							
2014	Sydney Shield	4	0	28	Last 4 Preliminary Finalist	22	14	8	0	600	418	182
2015	Sydney Shield	7	2	22	Last 6 Semi-Finalist	22	10	12	0	546	514	32
2016	Sydney Shield	4	0	31	Last 6 Semi-Finalist	24	15	8	1	703	531	172
2017	Sydney Shield	7	3	27	Top 8 Elimination Semi-Finalist	23	10	12	1	512	572	-60
2018	Sydney Shield	9	2	14		18	5	13	0	332	447	-115
2019	Sydney Shield	12	1	4		20	1	18	1	364	958	-594
2020	Sydney Shield	N/A	0	1	Competition Cancelled	1	0	0	1	20	20	0
2020	Sydney Shield	3	1	13	Semi-Finalist	9	5	3	1	184	172	12

== See also ==
- List of rugby league clubs in Australia
