= Windsor Wolves =

Australian rugby league club, based in Windsor, NSW

Club information
- Full name: Windsor Wolves Rugby League Football Club
- Colours: Green; Yellow
- Founded: 1912; 113 years ago (League), 1891; 134 years ago (Union)
- Website: Club Website on facebook

Current details
- Ground: Windsor Sporting Complex

Records
- Premierships: 2 Third Tier (2005, 2008)
- Runners-up: 2 Second Tier (2010, 2013 (NSW Cup))
- Minor premierships: 1 Third Tier (2008)

The Windsor Wolves are a rugby league team based in the town of Windsor, New South Wales. The club fields both junior and senior teams in the Penrith District Rugby League competitions. The club has fielded teams in semi-professional, New South Wales Rugby League competitions. In March 2020 the club re-entered the third-tier Ron Massey Cup and fourth-tier Sydney Shield competitions. These competitions were cancelled after one round of matches due to the COVID-19 pandemic in Australia. When the Sydney Shield was reorganised for a restart in July 2020, Windsor did not participate.

== Playing Record in NSWRL Competitions ==
=== Second Tier ===
The Wolves received an enormous boost in July 2007 as they signed a deal with the Penrith Panthers to act as a feeder club for them in the NSW Cup for three seasons. This was a great achievement for the small club and meant that they participated in one of two competitions that sit immediately below the National Rugby League. The deal was extended, but ended at the conclusion of the 2013 season.

Year	Competition	Ladder			Finals Position	All Match Record						
Year	Competition	Pos	Byes	Pts	Finals Position	P	W	L	D	For	Agst	Diff
2008	NSW Cup	5	0	26	Quarter-Finalist	23	13	10	0	580	603	-23
2009	NSW Cup	10	2	15		20	5	14	1	416	689	-273
2010	NSW Cup	4	0	32	Grand Finalist	29	17	10	2	870	716	154
2011	NSW Cup	10	2	17		23	6	16	1	459	702	-243
2012	NSW Cup	5	2	32	Top 8 Elimination Semi-Finalist	25	14	11	0	749	568	181
2013	NSW Cup	4	2	33	Grand Finalist	27	16	10	1	826	691	135

=== Third Tier ===
The Windsor Wolves had played in the NSWRL Jim Beam Cup since the inception of the competition in 2003 to 2016. This competition is now known as the Ron Massey Cup. In the mid-1970s, Windsor competed in an equivalent, the Metropolitan Cup. They also participated for a single season in 1993.

The Wolves won the Jim Beam Cup competition twice, in 2005 and 2008, defeating Sydney Bulls on both occasions 23–18 in 2005 & 36–16 in 2008 grand finals.

Year	Competition	Ladder			Finals Position	All Match Record						
Year	Competition	Pos	Byes	Pts	Finals Position	P	W	L	D	For	Agst	Diff
1974	Metropolitan Cup	3		26	Finalist	23	13	8	2	311	297	14
1975	Metropolitan Cup	2	2	27	Grand Finalist	19	14	4	1	444	222	222
1976	Metropolitan Cup	2	0	23	Finalist	18	11	6	1	418	246	172
1993	Metropolitan Cup	6	2	18		16	6	8	2	250	284	-34
2003	Jim Beam Cup	8	0	18		22	8	12	2	480	518	-38
2004	Jim Beam Cup	2	2	31	Finalist	22	13	8	1	627	570	57
2005	Jim Beam Cup	2	3	29	Premiers	22	16	5	1	705	473	232
2006	Jim Beam Cup	5	2	20	Elimination Semi-Finalist	17	8	9	0	444	420	24
2007	Jim Beam Cup	4	0	32	Elimination Semi-Finalist	23	16	7	0	697	518	179
2008	Jim Beam Cup	1	0	34	Premiers	25	19	6	0	815	672	143
2009	Bundaberg Red Cup	5	0	22	Elimination Semi-Finalist	19	11	8	0	528	485	43
2010	Bundaberg Red Cup	5	0	21	Elimination Semi-Finalist	22	10	11	1	579	622	-43
2011	Bundaberg Red Cup	5	0	18	Semi-Finalist	23	10	13	0	572	573	-1
2012	Bundaberg Red Cup	3	0	27	Semi-Finalist	20	13	6	1	712	414	298
2013	Ron Massey Cup	7	0	21	Top 8 Elimination Semi-Finalist	23	10	12	1	625	600	25
2014	Ron Massey Cup	9	0	20		22	9	11	2	604	576	28
2015	Ron Massey Cup	4	2	28	Last 4 Preliminary Finalist	22	13	9	0	548	566	-18
2016	Ron Massey Cup	12	2	14		20	5	15	0	376	626	-250
2020	Ron Massey Cup	N/A	0	0	Competition Cancelled	1	0	1	0	16	40	-24

=== Fourth Tier ===
The Windsor Wolves competed in the 2015 and 2016 Sydney Shield seasons. They entered a team in the 2020 competition, playing one match before the competition was cancelled. Windsor did not enter a team when the competition was reorganised and run through July to September. In the mid-1970s, Windsor fielded a team in the Metropolitan Cup Reserve Grade competition, winning that premiership on two occasions.

Year	Competition	Ladder			Finals Position	All Match Record						
Year	Competition	Pos	Byes	Pts	Finals Position	P	W	L	D	For	Agst	Diff
1974	Metro Reserves	2		31	Premiers	21	15	5	1	332	189	143
1975	Metro Reserves	2	2	28	Premiers	16	14	2	0	384	128	256
1976	Metro Reserves	2	0	23	Finalist	16	11	4	0	342	185	157
2015	Sydney Shield	2	2	30	Last 4 Preliminary Finalist	23	14	7	2	717	586	131
2016	Sydney Shield	9	0	16		22	7	13	2	579	632	-53
2020	Sydney Shield	N/A	0	0	Competition Cancelled	1	0	1	0	10	24	-14

== Team Of The Century ==
1. Chris Walker
2. Collin Murphy
3. Vaughan Humphreys
4. Terry Glover
5. Dan Randall
6. Ron Phillips
7. Garry Longhurst
8. Tito Nuimata
9. Keith Sunderland
10. Leo Grosso
11. Tony Buckpitt
12. Jim Moffat
13. Richie Grech
14. Ray Robinson
15. Val De Bono
16. Craig Trindall
17. Tony Saunders

Coach. Rod Payne

== Notable Juniors ==
- Mitchell Kenny
- Matt Moylan
- Lachlan Coote
- Reagan Campbell-Gillard
- George Jennings

== Gallery ==
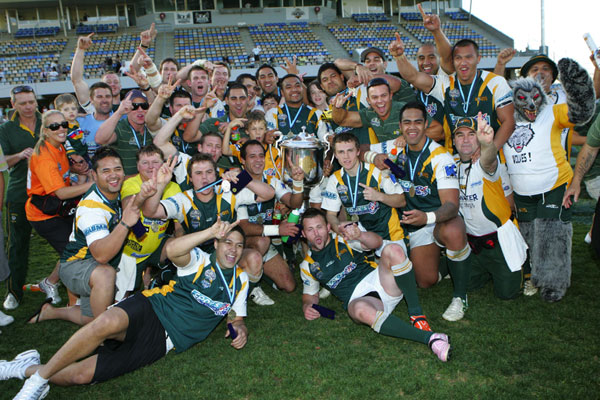
2008 Jim Beam Cup

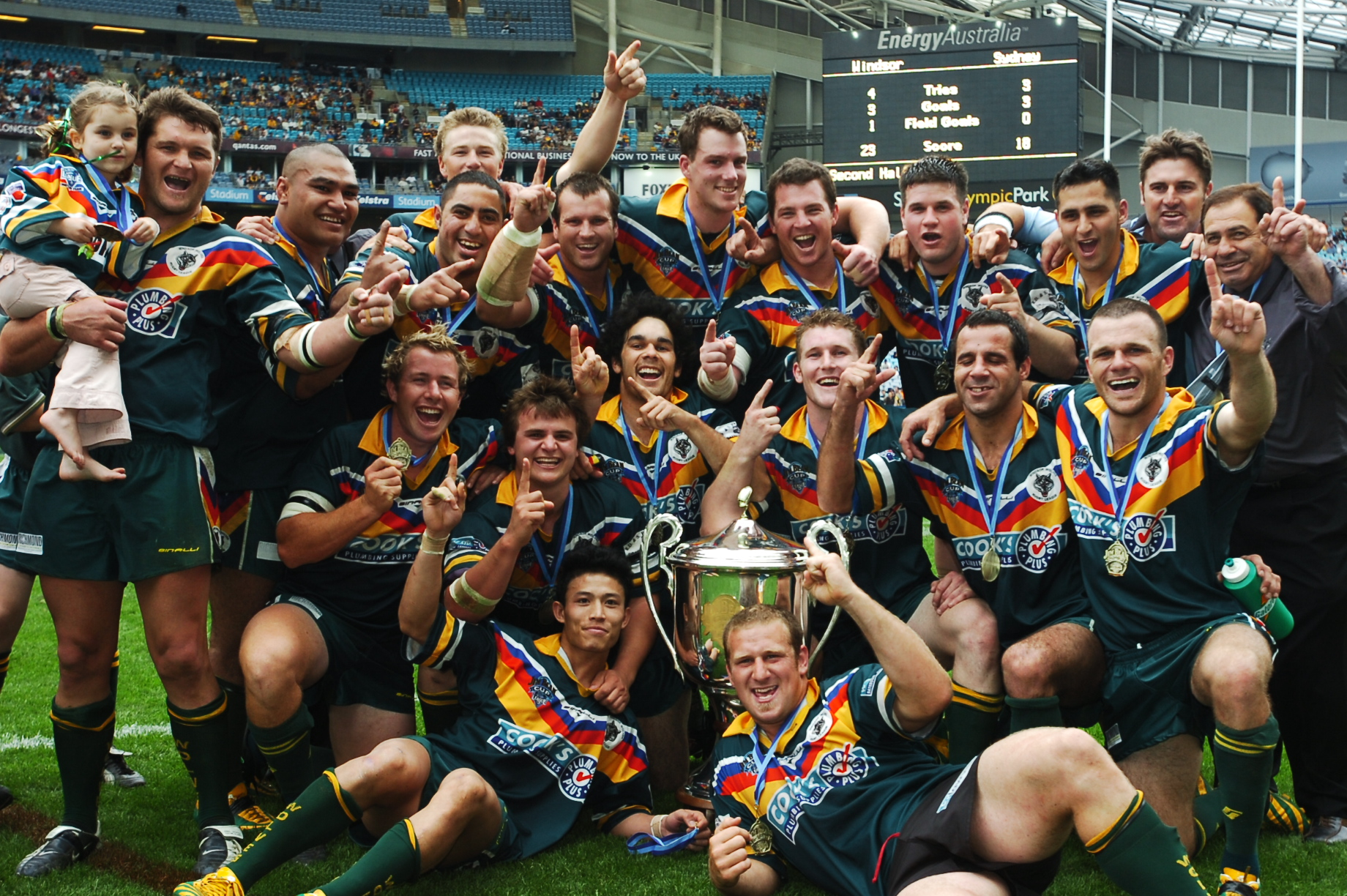
2005 Grand Final

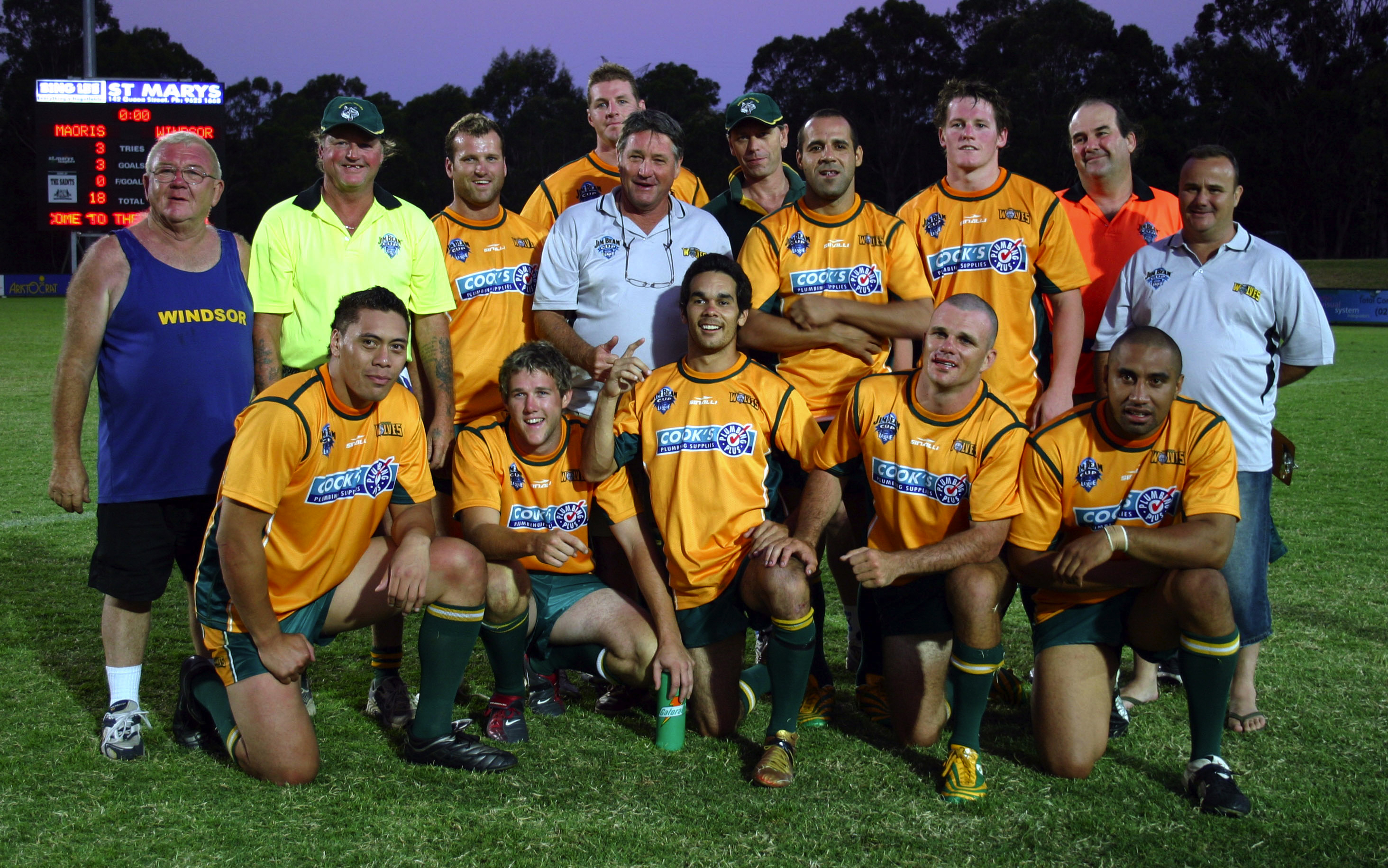
2006 World 7`s

== See also ==
- List of rugby league clubs in Australia
- Rugby league in New South Wales
