= NSWRL Women's Premiership =

Rugby league competition

Harvey Norman Women's Premiership
- Current season or competition: 2026 NSWRL Major Competitions
- Sport: Rugby league
- Formerly known as: Sydney Metropolitan Women's Rugby League
- Instituted: 2005
- Inaugural season: 2005
- Number of teams: 7
- Country: Australia
- Most titles: Forestville Ferrets; Canley Heights Dragons (4 titles)
- Website: NSW Women's Premiership
- Related competition: NRL Women's Premiership; Women's National Championship; Tarsha Gale Cup

The NSWRL Women's Premiership, known as the Harvey Norman NSWRL Women's Premiership due to sponsorship from Harvey Norman, is the top level of women's rugby league football in New South Wales, Australia. Run by the New South Wales Rugby League, the competition is New South Wales's first statewide open age women's competition.

The NSWRL Women's Premiership is a rugby league competition for clubs in New South Wales. It is the only statewide open-age competition for women in New South Wales and is run by New South Wales Rugby League.

The NSWRL Women's Premiership started in 2005 as Sydney Metropolitan Women's Rugby League after the former competition folded in 2001.

== Clubs ==
Club	Established	Entered competition	City	Stadium
Canterbury Bulldogs	1935	2018 (Note: Did not compete in the 2021 or 2022 seasons.)	Canterbury-Bankstown District	Belmore Sports Ground
Central Coast Roosters	1947	2020	Central Coast	Central Coast Regional Sporting Complex, Tuggerah, Woy Woy Oval
Cronulla Sharks	1967	2019	Sutherland Shire	PointsBet Stadium, Cronulla High School
St. George Illawarra Dragons	1999	2027	St George District, Illawarra	Collegians Sporting Complex, Figtree; WIN Stadium; Jubilee Oval, Carlton
Mounties		2017 (Note: Did not compete in the 2020 season.)	Mount Pritchard	Aubrey Keech Reserve
Newcastle Knights	1988	2022	Newcastle	Newcastle Knights Centre of Excellence, Maitland Showground
Parramatta Eels	1947	2024	Parramatta	Kellyville, Eric Tweedale Stadium, Merrylands
Penrith Panthers	1967	2025	Penrith	Parker Street Reserve, Penrith
South Sydney Rabbitohs	1908	2018	Redfern	Redfern Oval, ANZ Stadium
Wentworthville Magpies	1923	2018	Wentworthville	Ringrose Park
Wests Tigers	2000	2019	Balmain, Ashfield & Campbelltown	Lidcombe Oval, Campbelltown Stadium

=== Previous clubs ===
- Berkeley Vale Panthers (2017)
- Cabramatta Two Blues (2018–2019, 2021)
- Canterbury Bulldogs (2018–2019)
- CRL Newcastle (2018–2019)
- Cronulla Sharks (2017–2018)
- Forestville Ferrets (2017)
- Glebe Dirty Reds (2021)
- Glenmore Park Brumbies (2017)
- Greenacre Tigers (2017)
- Helensburgh Tigers (2021)
- North Newcastle (2017)
- Penrith Brothers (2018–2019)
- Redfern All Blacks (2017)
- St Marys Saints (2018, 2021–22)
- North Sydney Bears (2018-2023)
- Manly-Warringah Sea Eagles (2024)
- St. George Dragons (2023-2026)
- Illawarra Steelers (2023-2026)

Clubs that competed in the Sydney Metropolitan Women's Rugby League Premiership (2005–2016) included: Auburn, Berkeley Vale Panthers, Blacktown, Canley Heights Dragons, Canley Vale Kookas, Cronulla Sharks, East Campbelltown Eagles, Forestville Ferrets, Greenacre Tigers, Guildford Raiders, Hunter Stars (2016 only), Maitland Pickers, Mounties, Newtown Jetettes, Parramatta Junior Eels, Redfern All Blacks, Windsor Wolves.

Clubs the completed in the Sydney Women's Rugby League premiership (1992–2002) included Bankstown, Blacktown, Bulli, North Sydney, Parramatta Junior Eels, Petersham-Lewisham Wildfires, South Sydney Juniors, Waverton Reds and Western Sydney Wildcats.

== Results by year ==
Year	Premiers	Score	Runners-up	Minor Premiers	Wooden Spoon	Ref
1992	North Sydney	10 – 8	Wildfires			
1993	Waverton Eagles					
1994	Blacktown Wildfires	22 – 18	Waverton Eagles	Waverton Eagles		
1995	Bulli		Parramatta Eels			
1996	South Sydney Rabbitohs	26 – 16	Parramatta Eels			
1997	South Sydney Rabbitohs	26 – 14	Parramatta Eels			
1998–1999	Unknown					
2000	St Marys Saints					
2001-04	No Premiership					
Sydney Metropolitan Women's Premiership
2005	Redfern All Blacks					
2006	Canley Vale Kookas	18 – 8	Newtown Jetettes			
2007	Cabramatta Two Blues		Forestville Ferrets			
2008	Forestville Ferrets	8 – 6	Canley Vale Kookas			
2009	Forestville Ferrets	24 – 16	Campbelltown Eagles	Campbelltown Eagles		
2010	Forestville Ferrets		Canley Heights Dragons			
2011	Canley Heights Dragons	12 – 6	Forestville Ferrets			
2012	Canley Heights Dragons		Blacktown			
2013	Canley Heights Dragons	44 – 6	Forestville Ferrets			
2014	Canley Heights Dragons	42 – 26	Redfern All Blacks			
2015	Greenacre Tigers	14 – 12	Forestville Ferrets			
2016	Cronulla-Caringbah Sharks	26 – 22	Greenacre Tigers	Mount Prichard Mounties	Forestville Ferrets	
NSWRL Women's Premiership
2017	Redfern All Blacks	26 – 16	North Newcastle	Redfern All Blacks	Berkeley Vale Panthers	
2018	Mount Prichard Mounties	12 – 10	South Sydney Rabbitohs	South Sydney Rabbitohs	Wentworthville Magpies	
2019	CRL Newcastle	24 – 10	Mount Prichard Mounties	Mount Prichard Mounties	Penrith Brothers	
2020	Central Coast Roosters	16 – 10	North Sydney Bears	Central Coast Roosters	Wentworthville Magpies	
2021	No Grand Final due to lockdown to mitigate COVID-19 risks			Central Coast Roosters	Cabramatta Two Blues	
2022	Wests Tigers	21 – 20	Cronulla-Sutherland Sharks	North Sydney Bears	Wentworthville Magpies	
2023	Mount Prichard Mounties	1 – 0	Canterbury Bulldogs	North Sydney Bears	St George Dragons	
2024	Illawarra Steelers	10 – 6	Newcastle Knights	Wentworthville Magpies	St George Dragons	
2025	Cronulla-Sutherland Sharks	18 – 12	Newcastle Knights	Newcastle Knights	St George Dragons	
2026	Mount Prichard Mounties	22 – 6	Newcastle Knights	Newcastle Knights	Canterbury Bulldogs	

== Grand finals ==
=== 2017 ===
Sunday, 24 September 2017
16:20

Redfern All Blacks	26 – 16	North Newcastle
Tries: Taleena Simon (2); Karri Doyle (2); Nakia Davis-Welsh; Chloe Leaupepe; Goals: Chloe Leaupepe (1/6)	Report; Highlights	Tries: Kylie Hilder; Holli Wheeler; Isabelle Kelly; Goals: Caitlin Moran (2/3)

Leichhardt Oval, Sydney

=== 2018 ===
Monday, 10 September 2018
17:30

Mount Prichard Mounties	12 – 10	South Sydney Rabbitohs
Tries: Simaima Taufa; Patricia Raikadroka; Goals: Janelle Williams (2/3)	Report; Highlights	Tries: Taleena Simon; Sharon McGrady; Goals: Maddie Studdon (1/2)

ANZ Stadium, Sydney

=== 2019 ===
Saturday, 10 August 2019

Mount Prichard Mounties	10 – 24	CRL Newcastle
Tries: 2 Tommaya Kelly-Sines 8'; Tahlia Hunter 30'; Goals: 1 Brydie Parker 1/2 10'	Report; Highlights	Tries: 4 Bobbi Law 13'; Kylie Hilder 25'; Tayla Predebon 37'; Simone Smith 57'; Goals: 4 Melanie Howard 3/3 27', 38', 58'; Skye McKenzie 1/1 15'

ANZ Stadium, Sydney
Referee: Ben McMurray

=== 2020 ===
Saturday, 26 September 2020
13:30

Central Coast Roosters	16 – 10	North Sydney Bears
Tries: 2 Claire Reed 2 14', 34'; Bobbi Law 8'; Goals: 2 Bobbi Law 1/2; Melanie Howard 1/1	Report; Highlights	Tries: 2 Shontelle Stowers 20'; Moniqca Mo'Ale 45'; Goals: 1 Chloe Leaupepe 1/2

Bankwest Stadium, Sydney
Referee: Karra-Lee Nolan

=== 2022 ===
Saturday, 16 July 2022
14:00

Cronulla-Sutherland Sharks	20 – 21	Wests Tigers
Tries: 4 Tiana Penitani 17'; Talei Holmes 43'; Zali Fay 53'; Sam Bremner 73'; Goals: 2 Maddie Studdon 2/5 31', 74'	Report; Highlights; Stats	Tries: 4 Keele Browne 2 21', 78'; Jessica Sergis 35'; Josephine Lenaz 46'; Goals: 2 Emily Curtain 2/3 35', 79'; Tayla Preston 0/1; Drop goals: 1 Emily Curtain 84'

Campbelltown Stadium, Sydney
Referee: Dillan Wells

=== 2023 ===
Saturday, 29 April 2023
18:00 AEST (UTC+10)

Canterbury Bulldogs	0 – 1	Mount Pritchard Mounties
	Report; Highlights; Stats	Field goals: 1 Matilda Power 67'

Leichhardt Oval, Sydney
Referee: Nathan Loveday

=== 2024 ===
Saturday, 29 September 2024
18:00 AEST (UTC+10)

Illawarra Steelers	10 – 6	Newcastle Knights
Tries: 2 Shae Muhleisen 36'; Bronte Wilson 66'; Goals: 1 Tayleah Handcock 1/2 67'	Report	Tries: 1 Leah Ollerton 55'; Goals: 1 Jessica Gentle 1/1 57'

CommBank Stadium, Sydney

== Player awards ==
The Player of the Year award for the women's premiership is typically announced at the Brad Fittler Medal Awards night, prior the Grand Final.

Season	Player of the Year	Player's Club	Ref
2017	Caitlin Moran	North Newcastle	
2018	Simaima Taufa	Mounties	
2019	Nita Maynard	North Sydney Bears	
2020	Not awarded		
2021	Jessica Sergis	Helensburgh Tigers	
2022	Kirra Dibb	North Sydney Bears	
2023	Holli Wheeler	Canterbury-Bankstown Bulldogs	
2024	Leilani Wilson	Wentworthville Magpies	
2025	Monique Donovan	Cronulla-Sutherland Sharks	
2026	Charley Lahmert	Newcastle Knights	

== See also ==
- Women's rugby league in Australia
- Women's rugby league
- Rugby League Competitions in Australia
