= Australian Women's Rugby League =

Former Australian female rugby league

The Australian Women's Rugby League was the governing body of female rugby league in Australia and other parts of Oceania from its establishment in 1993 until December 2013, when its operations were integrated into the National Rugby League, under the Australian Rugby League Commission.

Women's rugby league teams from Sydney, Illawarra and Canberra had played in weekend tournaments in 1991 and 1992. To coincide with the 1993 tournament, arrangements were made for stakeholders to meet with the view of establishing an association. An interim committee was elected, and in December 1993 announced their intention to seek affiliation with what was then the Australian Rugby League. It took the association five years to be recognized by the game's governing body, which by then had emerged from the Super League war.

The AWRL was run at state level by its own governing organizations in the Queensland Women's Rugby League, New South Wales Women's Rugby League, Canberra Women's Rugby League and the Western Australian Women's Rugby League. The main women's competitions in Australia during the period were the Sydney Metro Women's Rugby League and Brisbane and District Women's Rugby League. Following the integration, the Sydney and Brisbane competitions were elevated to state-wide competitions, the NSWRL Women's Premiership and QRL Women's Premiership.

At international level the Women's Australian side is commonly referred to as the Australian Jillaroos.

From 1995, the AWRL has staged international fixtures against other women's rugby league countries.

- 1995 Australia vs New Zealand 2 Test Series
- 1996 Australia vs Great Britain 3 Test Series
- 1997 New Zealand vs Australia 2 Test Series
- 1998 Fiji vs Australia 2 Test Series
- 1999 Australia vs New Zealand 3 Test series
- 2000 1st Women's RL World Cup staged in England
- 2001 New Zealand vs Australia Test match
- 2002 Australia vs Great Britain 3 Test series
- 2003 Australia vs New Zealand Māori match
- 2003 2nd Women's RL World Cup staged in New Zealand
- 2004 Australia vs New Zealand 2 Test series
- 2005 Australian Under 21s vs Auckland Under 21s in Auckland
- 2007 New Zealand Māori vs Australia 2 match series
- 2008 3rd Women's RL World Cup staged in Australia
- 2009 Australia in New Zealand, playing one match against the New Zealand national team, and another against New Zealand
- 2011 Samoa vs Australia Test match
- 2013 4th Women's RL World Cup staged in England

== AWRL National Championships ==
- 1998 - Queensland
- 1999 - Canberra
- 2008 - South East Queensland

== See also ==
- Women's rugby league in Australia
- NRL Women's – the official league for women's rugby league in Australia starting in 2018
