= Women's rugby league in Australia =

- Country: Australia
- National team: Australia
- First played: 1921
- Registered players: 180,000

Women's rugby league is a popular women's sport in Australia. The sport has a moderate level of participation in the country both recreational and professional. Australian Rugby League Commission (ARLC) is the national governing body of the sport in Australia, organising the Australian Women's Rugby League, the Australian women's national team, and the nine state governing bodies of the game, among other duties. Women's participation of modern rugby league has been recorded since the early 1920s. It has since become one of Australia's most popular women's team sports.

== History ==
=== 1920s ===
The first Women's Rugby League match in Australia was played in Sydney, on Saturday, 17 September 1921. Players, who had been training in the preceding months, had been divided into two teams, named Metropolitan (who played in blue jerseys) and Sydney (who played in maroon jerseys). Metropolitan won the match 21–11. The crowd of 34,000 was the largest ever for women's sport in Australia for many years. A second 'return' match was played the following Saturday, 24 September 1921. Three matches were held in 1922 in April, August and October. The organisation was disbanded prior to the 1923 season. A further women's rugby league match was held in Sydney in October 1930.

| Date | Team 1 | Score | Team 2 | Venue | References |
|---|---|---|---|---|---|
| 17 Sep 1921 | Metropolitan | 21 — 11 | Sydney | Agricultural Ground | Sun DT |
| 24 Sep 1921 | Metropolitan | 3 — 9 | Sydney | Agricultural Ground | Sun |
| 17 Apr 1922 | Metropolitan | 10 — 25 | Sydney | National Park, Newcastle | NS |
| 7 Aug 1922 | Metropolitan | 13 — 0 | Sydney | Newcastle Sports Ground | NMH |
| 2 Oct 1922 | Metropolitan | 11 — 11 | Sydney | Sydney Sports Ground | DT Sun |

=== 1950s ===
In September 1950 a women's rugby league game was played in Toowoomba, Queensland in support of fund raising efforts for a candidate as queen of the Carnival of Flowers festival. A Toowoomba team defeated a team from Warwick by 16 points to nil, scoring four tries kicking two conversions.

In June 1951 two women's teams played a rugby league match in West Wyalong, New South Wales as part of a weekend sports carnival to raise funds for the local hospital. In September 1951 a game was played in Longreach, Queensland which raised £21 for charity as the Red Gnomes defeated the Blue Fairies by four tries to two for a twelve points to six scoreline.

In August 1954 two women's teams played a 24 minute match as part of a programme of charity cup rugby league games in Rockhampton. The Blues defeated the Greens by five to nil, with the day raising £227 for the local ambulance.

On 22 July 1956 an interstate women's rugby league match was held on the Athletic Ground in St Marys, New South Wales between the Belles of St. Mary's and the Queensland Bonfires. The match was in part refereed by Clive Churchill. The Queensland side won by 22 points to 3. The St. Mary's team had played and won three games prior to this interstate match, including a match against the Riverstone Rubies.

=== 1970s ===
In the mid-1970s Women's Rugby League teams were organised in Perth, including South Perth and Cottesloe.

In 1976, a Women's Rugby League team from Manurewa in Auckland, New Zealand toured Australia. The Manurewa club had earlier received junior boys teams from Goulburn and Lalor Park, Sydney and these two clubs offered to host a visit from Manurewa's ladies team. A women's team was formed in Goulburn to play against the tourists. They played two matches, one in Goulburn and another at Endeavour Field in Cronulla. The Lalor Park team had played and won four local matches prior to their match against Manurewa.

=== 1990s ===
In the early part of the 1990s Women's Rugby League competitions were run in Sydney, the Illawarra and the Australian Capital Territory. Some of the clubs from those regions participated in an annual knock-out competition. The East Canberra club won this knock-out tournament in three consecutive years: 1991, 1992 and 1993. Other participating clubs included the Albion Park Outlaws, Calwell Colts, North Sydney, Northern Districts Illawarra, Warilla Warriors, Woden Valley and the Wollongong Wildcats. In the final of the 1994 tournament, Picton defected Bulli.

Competition rules for the 1995 Sydney Women's Rugby League season had modifications to team size. On-field teams were between seven (minimum) and ten (maximum) players, with the number for a match being determined by the availability of players on the day. Including players starting on the bench, teams were limited to fourteen players. The number of interchanges been on-field and bench was unlimited. Scrums were three players per team in a front row formation. Game time was two thirty minute halves.

In 1995, Australia hosted a tour by the New Zealand national team. This was the inaugural series of Test Matches for both countries in Women's Rugby League. Tour matches were played in Sydney, Canberra and Brisbane.

In 1996, Australia hosted a seven match, three Test tour by the Great Britain women's national rugby league team. Australia claimed their inaugural international win in the First Test in Canberra. Great Britain, however, won the Second Test in Brisbane and the Third Test at Redfern Oval in Sydney to claim a series victory.

The Australian national team toured New Zealand in 1997 (both matches lost) and Fiji in 1998 (both matches won). Hosting duties for a Test Match series in 1999 were shared with New Zealand with games played at Leichhardt Oval and Penrith Stadium in Sydney and the third and final match played in Auckland. Australia beat New Zealand for the first time in the Second Test at Penrith, but the Kiwi Ferns won the series, 2–1.

The women's game in Queensland expanded from Brisbane and Ipswich in 1998 when a competition commenced in Mackay. Souths beat the previously undefeated Norths in the Grand Final.

During the later years of the 1990s National Championships were conducted with representative, rather than club, teams participating. In 1997, Illawarra beat Brisbane in the final. The 1998 tournament was held at Pizzey Park, Burleigh Heads and included teams from Sydney, Canberra, Illawarra, Brisbane, Ipswich and for the first time Western Australia. The 1999 tournament was reconfigured to have four state/territory teams. New South Wales beat Queensland in the final, ahead of Western Australia and the Australian Capital Territory.

The year 1999 saw the introduction of an interstate series between Queensland and New South Wales. The teams play for the Nellie Doherty Cup. Although this ongoing series was occasionally referred to in the media as the Women's State of Origin the respective teams were selected on a residential basis until 2017. Queensland won this augural match, 16–14.

=== 2000s ===
Australia participated in the inaugural Women's Rugby League World Cup in November 2000, playing two matches each against Great Britain & Ireland and New Zealand. The Australian squad comprised players from the Australian Capital Territory, New South Wales, Queensland and Western Australia.

National Championships were held at Belmont, Western Australia in 2000, Rooty Hill, New South Wales in 2001, Ipswich, Queensland in 2002, West Belconnen, Australian Capital Territory in 2003, Runaway Bay, Queensland in 2005, and Queanbeyan, New South Wales in 2006. Queensland won the tournament in 2000 and 2001. In 2003, Queensland Whites defeated Queensland Maroons in the final, ahead of ACT and NSW teams. The tournament was not held in 2004. In 2005, South East Queensland beat a Queensland Barbarians team in the final, ahead of NSW City and NSW Country teams. in 2006, Brisbane beat Sydney Metro in the final, ahead of NSW Country Monaro and NSW Country Southern Division teams.

The 2008 Women's Rugby League World Cup was the first held in Australia from 26 October, culminating in the final between Australian Jillaroos and the Kiwi Ferns on 22 November. It was held at Stockland Park alongside the Police World Cup. Eight teams took part including defending champions New Zealand.

=== 2010s ===
The 2011 All Stars match included the first Women's All Stars exhibition match which was won by the NRL Women's All Stars 22–6.

In 2016 the first local derby by NRL clubs was played Cronulla Sharks and St. George Illawarra Dragons had a Women's rugby league nines match at Southern Cross Group Stadium which aired on Fox Sports it was a curtain-raiser for the main game Sharks won 16–12.

The New South Wales Rugby League announced the creation of a nine-a-side under-18s women's league for 2017 Named the Tarsha Gale Nines after the former Australian Jillaroos and NSW captain of the 1990s.

For the first time in the sport's history the 2017 Women's Rugby League World Cup was held concurrently with the men's tournament.

On 14 May 2017 the first Women's City vs Country Origin game was played.

== National Championships ==
The Women's Rugby League Australian National Championships have continually evolved since their establishment in the early 1990s. The tournament was initially for club sides, with the ability of the players to self-fund their travel to the tournament being a factor in the number of teams participating. 1994 saw a change to regional representative teams. In 2018 and 2019 the tournament featured the best Australian-based players in the women's game. With the advent and success of the NRL Women's Premiership (NRLW), the tournament was revised to have a development focus on emerging talent.

| Year | Winner | Score | Runner up | Date of Final | Host Location | Other Competing Teams | Ref |
|---|---|---|---|---|---|---|---|
| 1991 | East Canberra | | | | | | |
| 1992 | East Canberra | 18 – 6 | North Sydney | 11 Oct 1992 | Rugby League Park | Albion Park Outlaws, Wollongong Wildcats, Warilla Warriors, Woden Valley and Calwell Colts | |
| 1993 | East Canberra | 24 – 0 | Northern Districts Illawarra | 25 Jul 1993 | O'Connor Oval | | |
| 1994 | Picton | 32 – 0 | Bulli Eagles | 12 Jun 1994 | Kippax Oval, Canberra | | |
| 1995 | Illawarra | 26 – 0 | Canberra | 11 Jun 1995 | | Hunter, Riverina, Sydney | |
| 1996 | Sydney | | | | | | |
| 1997 | Illawarra | 12 – 10 | Brisbane | | | | CM |
| 1998 | Brisbane | | Sydney | 6 Jun 1998 | Pizzey Park, Burleigh Heads | Sydney, Canberra, Illawarra, Brisbane, Ipswich, Western Australia (debut) | |
| 1999 | NSW | 12 – 8 | Queensland | 13 Jun 1999 | West Belconnen Leagues Club | ACT, WA | |
| 2000 | Queensland | | NSW | 11 Jun 2000 | Belmont, WA | WA, ? | AR |
| 2001 | Queensland | 12 – 6 | NSW | | Rooty Hill RSL | ACT, Australian Under 23's | AR |
| 2002 | Queensland A | 32 – 10 | NSW | | Ipswich | | |
| 2003 | Queensland Whites | 20 – 12 | Queensland Maroons | | West Belconnen; Canberra | ACT, NSW | |
| 2004 | Not held | | | | | | AR |
| 2005 | South East Queensland | | Queensland Barbarians | | Runaway Bay; Gold Coast | NSW City; NSW Country | AR |
| 2006 | Brisbane | 18 – 10 | Sydney Metro | 11 Jun 2006 | Seiffert Oval, Queanbeyan | NSW Country Monaro, NSW Country Southern Division | CT |
| 2007 | Brisbane | 12 – 6 | Sydney Metro | | Kougari Oval' Wynnum | Cairns (debut); Central Queensland (debut); NSW Country National Barbarians | AR |
| 2008 | South East Queensland | 14 – 4 | Sydney City | | Sydney | NSW Country, North Queensland, Barbarians | AR |
| 2009 | Brisbane | | NSW City | | Runaway Bay; Gold Coast | NSW Residents; North Queensland North; North Queensland South | AR |
| 2010 | to 2017. Unknown. In some years only State Championships were held. | | | | | | |
| 2018 | NSW Country | 16 – 12 | NSW City | 3 Jun 2018 | Owen Park | ADF; Combined Affiliated States; Qld City; Qld Country | |
| 2019 | NSW City | 34 – 4 | NSW Country | 2 Jun 2019 | Pizzey Park, Gold Coast | ADF; Combined Affiliated States; SEQ; Qld Country | |
| 2020 | Not held due to lockdown measures in response to Covid-19 | | | | | | |
| 2021 | Western Australia | 10 – 6 | First Nation's Gems | 23 May 2021 | Moreton Daily Stadium, Redcliffe | ADF; NT; SA; Victoria | |
| 2022 | NSW Country | 24 – 0 | Western Australia | 12 Jun 2022 | Pizzey Park, Gold Coast | ADF; First Nation's Gems; NT; Victoria | |

For the 2022 National Championships, a four-team Under 19 tournament was run in addition to the six-team open age tournament. Queensland Rubys (10) defeated NSW City (4) in the final. The other Under 19 teams were NSW Country and the Queensland Sapphires.

=== 2023 and 2024 Tournaments ===
The format of the National Championships was restructured ahead of the 2023 tournament. The NRL announced that to further focus on player development and opportunities for players to be seen by NRLW clubs, there would be no official winner. Teams were divided into three pools for the first three days of the four-day tournament. On the fourth and final day, teams would be paired off for matches based on earlier results.
A New Zealand team, named Ahi Ka Aotearoa, entered the 2023 tournament.
Fiji and Papua New Guinea teams entered the 2024 tournament. To accommodate these teams and preserve the twelve team structure, Queensland dropped from two teams to one team and NSW Country (Under 19's) and NSW Emerging Country (Open Age) merged.

| Year | Dates, Location, Grounds | Pool A | | Pool B | | Pool C | | Last Day Match-Ups | Ref |
| Year | Dates, Location, Grounds | Team | W | Team | W | Team | W | Last Day Match-Ups | Ref |
|---|---|---|---|---|---|---|---|---|---|
| 2023 | 18–21 May; Gold Coast; UAA Park | NSW City | 3 | Queensland Rubys | 3 | Northern Territory | 3 | NSW City drew Queensland Rubys | |
| 2023 | 18–21 May; Gold Coast; UAA Park | NSW Emerging Country | 2 | First Nations Gems | 2 | ADF | 2 | First Nations Gems drew NSW Emerging Country | |
| 2023 | 18–21 May; Gold Coast; UAA Park | Western Australia | 1 | NSW Country | 1 | Victoria | 1 | Northern Territory beat Western Australia | |
| 2023 | 18–21 May; Gold Coast; UAA Park | Queensland Sapphires | 0 | Ahi Ka Aotearoa | 0 | South Australia | 0 | ADF beat NSW Country; Queensland Sapphires beat Victoria; Ahi Ka Aotearoa beat South Australia | |
| 2024 | 21–24 March; Gold Coast; UAA Park | NSW City | 3 | Queensland Sapphires | 3 | NSW Country | 3 | Queensland Sapphires beat NSW City | |
| 2024 | 21–24 March; Gold Coast; UAA Park | Ahi Ka Aotearoa | 2 | First Nations Gems | 2 | Papua New Guinea | 2 | NSW Country beat Ahi Ka Aotearoa | |
| 2024 | 21–24 March; Gold Coast; UAA Park | Northern Territory | 1 | Fiji | 1 | ADF | 1 | First Nations Gems beat Papua New Guinea | |
| 2024 | 21–24 March; Gold Coast; UAA Park | Western Australia | 0 | Victoria | 0 | South Australia | 0 | Northern Territory beat Fiji; ADF beat Western Australia; Victoria beat South Australia | |

=== 2025 and 2026 Representative pathway matches ===
The National Championships were not staged in 2025. A series of representative pathways matches were held. An Invitational tournament was also introduced.

Representative pathway matches involving the following teams were staged in 2025:

- Queensland City (Brisbane) played Queensland Country at Totally Workwear Stadium in the Under 17 age group on Wednesday, 16 April 2025.
- New South Wales City (Sydney) played NSW Country at Kogarah (WIN) Jubilee Oval) in Under 19 and Under 17 age groups on Sunday, 18 May 2025.
- A Combined Affiliated States tournament for four women's teams was held in the Melbourne suburb of Seabrook, Victoria on the long weekend on June 6, 7 and 8. Western Australia won their three matches to win the tournament. Victoria and the Northern Territory both defeated South Australia and drew their match together.
- Australian Defence Force played a Papua New Guinea Blossoming Orchids team in Port Moresby on 15 June 2025.
- A four-team Invitational was held in Newcastle. on 31 July and 1 August 2026. Players from the following pathways were allocated into mixed teams: Combined Affiliated States, First Nations Gems, Papua New Guinea, Fiji, New South Wales, and Queensland. In addition, eleven "Wildcards" were invited, including several sportswomen from other sports.

Representative pathway matches involving the following teams were — or are to be — staged in 2026:

- Queensland City (Brisbane) played Queensland Country at UAA Park on the Gold Coast in the Under 17 age group on Sunday, 19 April 2026.
- New South Wales Country played NSW City (Sydney) at WIN Stadium in Under 19 and Under 17 age groups on Sunday, 17 May 2026.
- Queensland Country and Queensland City (Brisbane) open age women's teams are scheduled to play at Sunshine Coast Stadium on Saturday, 6 June 2026.

== Competitions ==
- NRL Women's Premiership
- Australian Women's Rugby League
- Brisbane and District Women's Rugby League
- Sydney Metropolitan Women's Rugby League

== See also ==
- Rugby league in Australia
- Women's rugby league
- NRL Women's Premiership – the official league for women's rugby league in Australia starting in 2018
- Women's rugby league in Great Britain
