= Sydney Metropolitan Women's Rugby League =

Australian premier competition

- Sport: Rugby league
- Instituted: 2005
- Replaced by: Top tier state competition is now the NSWRL Women's Premiership
- Number of teams: 22 Open Age; 9 Combined; 5 Central Macarthur Western; 8 Penrith
- Most titles: Canley Heights Dragons (4 titles)
- Website: NSWRL Sydney Metropolitan Combined
- Related competition: Brisbane and District Women's Rugby League, NSWRL Women's Premiership

The Sydney Metropolitan Women's Rugby League was the premier women's rugby league competition in the state of New South Wales, Australia. In 2017, the competition became known as the NSWRL Women's Premiership. The New South Wales Rugby League also administer open age women's and age group girls' competitions that sit below the NSWRL Women's Premiership. Within the Sydney Metropolitan region, there are several conferences.

== History ==
A regular women's rugby league competition was started in Sydney in the 1990s.

Competition rules for the 1995 season had modifications to team size. On-field teams were between seven (minimum) and ten (maximum) players, with the number for a match being determined by the availability of players on the day. Including players starting on the bench, teams were limited to fourteen players. The number of interchanges been on-field and bench was unlimited. Scrums were three players per team in a front row formation. Game time was two thirty minute halves.

Eight teams nominated for the 1995 SWRL season: Bankstown, Blacktown, Cabbage Tree Hotel (Bulli), Mount Pritchard, Northern Reds, North Sydney, Parramatta Eels Juniors, and Riverwood. Both Northern Reds and North Sydney had their home games scheduled at the same venue, Tunks Park in Cammeray. Fourteen rounds were scheduled from late April to mid-August, with the Grand Final in early September 1995.

This competition folded after the conclusion of the 2000 season.

In 2001, the New South Wales Women's Rugby League staged exhibition and trial matches in lieu of a competition.

The Sydney Metropolitan Women's Rugby League restarted a competition in 2005. A meeting in March 2005 at the PCYC in Miller, south west of Sydney was the catalyst to get the women's competition up and running again.

== Sydney Metropolitan - Rugby League Clubs with Women's Teams ==
In the 2025 season, four open-age women's rugby league competitions featured teams from Sydney.

- Metro Combined Gold (8 teams): Cabramatta Two Blues, Marrickville RSL, Mascot, Milperra Colts, Mounties, Pennant Hills Cherrybrook Stags, Redfern All Blacks, and Wentworthville Magpies.
- Metro Combined Silver (6 teams): All Saints Toongabbie Tigers, Chipping Norton, Forestville Ferrets, Lalor Park, Leichhardt Wanderers, Hills District Bulls.
- In Round 6 the above competitions were restructured.
  - Chipping Norton, Forestville Ferrets and Leichhardt Wanderers moved from gold to silver.
  - Cabramatta Two Blues, Milperra Colts, Mounties, and Wentworthville Magpies moved from silver to gold.
- Both competitions commenced on 6 April and ran to Round 15 on 10 August 2025, followed by a final series that concluded with a Grand Final on 31 August 2025.
  - Redfern All Blacks defeated Mounties in the gold competition.
  - Chipping Norton defeated Hills District Bulls in the silver competition.
- Southern Corridor Gold (3 teams from Sydney, 3 teams from the Illawarra & South Coast regions):
  - Sydney: Campbelltown City Kangaroos, Campbelltown Collegians, Cronulla Caringbah Sharks, The Oaks Tigers.
  - Illawarra & South Coast: Corrimal Cougars, Helensburgh Tigers, Shellharbour Sharks.
- Southern Corridor Silver (7 teams from Sydney, 3 teams from the Illawarra & South Coast regions):
  - Sydney: Camden Rams, De La Salle Caringbah, Engadine Dragons, Glenquarie All Stars, Oran Park Chargers, Thirlmere-Tahmoor Roosters, Warragamba Wombats.
  - Illawarra & South Coast: Avondale Wombats, Stingrays of Shellharbour, and Western Suburbs Red Devils.
- In Round 7 the above competitions were restructured.
  - Engadine Dragons were moved from gold to silver.
  - A second Campbelltown City Kangaroos team dropped out.
- Both competitions commenced on 26 April and ran to Round 15 on 10 August 2025, followed by a final series that concluded with a Grand Final on 30 August 2025.
  - Corrimal Cougars defeated Campbelltown City Kangaroos in the gold competition.
  - Camden Rams defeated De La Salle Caringbah in the silver competition.

== Premiers ==
| Year | Premiers | Score | Runner-ups | Ref |
|---|---|---|---|---|
Sydney Women's Rugby League
| 1992 | North Sydney | 10 – 8 | Wildfires | |
| 1993 | Waverton Eagles | | | |
| 1994 | Blacktown Wildfires | 22 – 18 | Waverton Eagles | |
| 1995 | Bulli | | Parramatta Eels | |
| 1996 | South Sydney | 26–16 | Parramatta Eels | |
| 1997 | South Sydney | 26–14 | Parramatta Eels | |
| 1998 | | | | |
| 1999 | | | | |
| 2000 | St Marys Saints | | | |
| 2001-04 | No Premiership | | | |
Sydney Metropolitan Women's Rugby League
| 2005 | Redfern All Blacks | | | |
| 2006 | Canley Vale Kookas | 18 – 8 | Newtown Jetettes | |
| 2007 | Cabramatta Two Blues | | Forestville Ferrets | |
| 2008 | Forestville Ferrets | 8 – 6 | Canley Vale Kookas | |
| 2009 | Forestville Ferrets | 24 – 16 | East Campbelltown Eagles | |
| 2010 | Cabramatta Two Blues | | Canley Heights Dragons | |
| 2011 | Canley Heights Dragons | 12 – 6 | Forestville Ferrets | |
| 2012 | Canley Heights Dragons | | Blacktown | |
| 2013 | Canley Heights Dragons | 44 – 6 | Forestville Ferrets | |
| 2014 | Canley Heights Dragons | 42-26 | Redfern All Blacks | |
| 2015 | Greenacre Tigers | 14-12 | Forestville Ferrets | |
| 2016 | Cronulla-Caringbah Sharks | 26-22 | Greenacre Tigers | |
NSW Women's Premiership
| 2017 | Redfern All Blacks | 26-16 | North Newcastle | |
| 2018 | Mounties | 12-10 | South Sydney Rabbitohs | |
| 2019 | CRL Newcastle | 12-10 | Mounties | |
| 2020 | Commenced but not completed, due to Covid-19 | | | |
Metro Combined Gold
| 2021 | Commenced but not completed, due to Covid-19 | | | |
| 2022 West | Mounties | 54-6 | Wentworthville Magpies | |
| 2022 East | La Perouse Panthers | 22-10 | Asquith Magpies | |
| 2023 | Wentworthville Magpies | 22-18 | Milperra Colts | |
| 2024 | St Christopher's | 18-4 | Mounties | |
| 2025 | Redfern All Blacks | 14-12 | Mounties | |

== Premiership Tally ==
| Rank | Club | Tally | Seasons | | | |
| Rank | Club | Tally | SWRL | SMWRL | NSW WP | Metro |
|---|---|---|---|---|---|---|
| 1 | Canley Heights Dragons | 4 | | 4 (2011, 2012, 2013, 2014) | | |
| 2 | **Redfern All Blacks** | 3 | | 1 (2005) | 1 (2017) | 1 (2025) |
| 3 | South Sydney Rabbitohs | 2 | 2 (1996, 1997) | | | |
| 3 | Forestville Ferrets | 2 | | 2 (2008, 2009) | | |
| 3 | **Cabramatta Two Blues** | 2 | | 2 (2007, 2010) | | |
| 3 | **Mount Pritchard Mounties** | 2 | | | 1 (2018) | 1 (2022 West) |
| 7 | North Sydney | 1 | 1 (1992) | | | |
| 7 | Waverton Eagles | 1 | 1 (1993) | | | |
| 7 | Blacktown Wildfires | 1 | 1 (1994) | | | |
| 7 | Bulli (Cabbage Tree Hotel) | 1 | 1 (1995) | | | |
| 7 | Canley Vale Kookas | 1 | | 1 (2006) | | |
| 7 | Greenacre Tigers | 1 | | 1 (2015) | | |
| 7 | Cronulla-Caringbah Sharks | 1 | | 1 (2016) | | |
| 7 | Country Rugby League Newcastle | 1 | | | 1 (2019) | |
| 7 | La Perouse Panthers | 1 | | | | 1 (2022 East) |
| 7 | Wentworthville Magpies | 1 | | | | 1 (2023) |
| 7 | St Christopher's | 1 | | | | 1 (2024) |

Bold means the team currently plays in the competition.

== Clubs by season ==
=== 1990s ===
1992 (5 teams)

- Bankstown, Bonnyrigg, North Sydney, Parramatta, and Wildfires.

1993 (6 teams)

- Bankstown Sports, Bonnyrigg Warriors, North Sydney, Waverton Eagles, Western Sydney, and Wildfires.

1994 (5 teams)

- Bankstown Sports, Blacktown, North Sydney, Western Sydney, and Waverton Eagles.
  - There was also a four team competition in the Illawarra: Bulli Eagles, Lakeview Bears, Picton Magpies, and Wollongong.

1995 (8 teams)

- Bankstown Sports, Blacktown Wildfires, Cabbage Tree Hotel (Bulli Eagles), Mount Pritchard, Northern Reds, North Sydney, Parramatta Eels Juniors, and Riverwood.
  - The Illawarra competition having collapsed, players from the region entered the Sydney Competition as the Cabbage Tree Hotel (Bulli). The team was referred to as Bulli in July.
  - There were two name changes: Western Sydney to Mount Pritchard and Waverton to Northern Reds.

1996 (5 teams)

- Mount Pritchard, North Sydney, Parramatta Eels, Penrith, South Sydney.

1997 (unsure of exact team numbers)

- Teams included: North Sydney, Parramatta Eels, South Sydney, St. Marys.

1998 (unsure of exact team numbers)

- Teams included: Parramatta Eels, South Sydney, Western Suburbs Magpies.

1999 (unsure of exact team numbers)

- Teams included: Parramatta Eels, South Sydney, Western Suburbs Magpies.

=== 2000s ===
2001

- No competition. The New South Wales Women's Rugby League staged a thirteen-a-side trial between South Sydney and Doonside and several other exhibition matches.

2002

- No competition.

2003

- No competition.

2004

- No competition.

2005 (unsure of exact team numbers)

- Teams included: Canley Vale Kookaburras, Newtown Jetettes, and Redfern All Blacks.

2006 (6 teams)

- Canley Vale Kookaburras, Guildford Owls, Newtown Jetettes, Parramatta Eels Juniors, Redfern All Blacks, and Windsor Wolves.
  - Guildford, Parramatta, and Windsor joined the competition.

2007 (unsure of exact team numbers)

- Teams included: Cabramatta Two Blues, Canley Vale Kookaburras, Canterbury Bulldogs, Forestville Ferrets (debut), and Renown United.

2008

- Campbelltown Eagles, Canley Heights Dragons, Forestville Ferrets, Nepean, Penrith, Newtown Jetettes, and Redfern All Blacks.

2009 (unsure of exact team numbers)

- Teams included: Canley Heights Dragons, East Campbelltown Eagles, Forestville Ferrets, Newtown Jetettes, and Penrith Waratahs (debut).

=== 2010s ===
2010 (unsure of exact team numbers)

- Teams included: All Saints Toongabbie, Canley Heights Dragons, Forestville Ferrets, Guildford Owls.

2011 (unsure of exact team numbers)

- Teams included: Canley Heights Dragons, Forestville Ferrets, Merrylands, Minchinbury Jets.

2012 (8 teams)

- Auburn Warriors, Blacktown Workers, Canley Heights Dragons, Forestville Ferrets, Maitland Pickers (debut), Minchinbury Jets, Penrith Waratahs, Redfern All Blacks.
  - An Illawarra team participated in and won the State Championships held at St Marys on a long weekend, 9-11 June 2012.

2013 (unsure of exact team numbers)

- Teams included: Canley Heights Dragons, Forestville Ferrets, Maitland Pickers, Penrith Waratahs.

2015 (11 teams)
Eleven teams competed, including three from clubs outside of Sydney.

- Within Sydney (8 teams): Berala Bears (debut), Forestville Ferrets, Greenacre Tigers, Lower Mountains, Mount Druitt PCYC, Minto Cobras, Redfern All Blacks, Penrith Waratahs.
- Outside Sydney (3 teams): Berkeley Vale Panthers, Helensburgh Tigers (debut), Maitland Pickers.
  - The Helensburgh Tigers also fielded a team in a four-team Illawarra competition. The other clubs were Berkeley Eagles, Corrimal Cougars, and Windang Pelicans.
  - Two tiers of finals series matches were staged. Greenacre Tigers played Forestville Ferrets in the Tier A grand final. Berkeley Vale Panthers played Berala Bears in the Tier B grand final.

2016
In 2016, the Sydney Metropolitan Women's Rugby League included the following clubs.

| Team | Home Ground | Open Div 1 | Open Div 2 | Under 18's | Under 15's |
|---|---|---|---|---|---|
| Berala Bears | Peter Hislop Park | | Yes | Yes | Yes |
| Berkeley Vale Panthers | Morry Breen Oval | Yes | | | |
| Chester Hill Rhinos | Terry Lamb Complex | | Yes | Yes | Yes |
| Cronulla-Caringbah Sharks | Cronulla High School | Yes | | Yes | Yes |
| Forestville Ferrets | Forestville Park | Yes | | | |
| Glenmore Park Brumbies | Ched Towns Reserve | | Yes | Yes | Yes |
| Greenacre Tigers | Roberts Park | Yes | | | |
| Hunter Stars | Cessnock Sportsground | Yes | | | |
| Maroubra | Snape Park | | Yes | | |
| Minchinbury | Mt Druitt Reserve | | Yes | Yes | Yes |
| Mount Pritchard Mounties | Mount Pritchard Oval | Yes | | | |
| Penrith Waratahs | Doug Rennie Field | | Yes | | |
| Redfern All Blacks | Waterloo Oval | Yes | | | |

=== 2020s ===
2020

- No competition due to lockdown measures taken to mitigate the Covid-19 pandemic.

2021
In the 2021 season, three open-age women's rugby league competitions were conducted across Sydney.

- **Combined Women's** (9 teams): Como Jannali Crocodiles, Forestville Ferrets, La Perouse Panthers, Leichhardt Wanderers, Marrickville RSL Kings, Mascot Jets, North Sydney Brothers, Redfern All Blacks, Ryde Eastwood Hawks.
- **Penrith and District** (8 teams): Blacktown City Bears, Doonside Roos, Emu Plains Emus, Minchinbury Jets, Mt Druitt Lions, Penrith Waratahs, St Clair Comets, St Marys Saints.
- **Central Macarthur Western** (5 teams): All Saints Toongabbie Tigers, Campbelltown Collegians Collie Dogs, Hinchbrook Hornets, Milperra Colts, Moorebank Rams.

2022

- **Metro Combined Gold** **West** (5 teams): Minchinbury Jets, Mounties, St Clair Comets, St Marys Saints, Wentworthville Magpies.
- **Metro Combined Gold** **East** (6 teams): Asquith Magpies, Como Jannali Crocoles, La Perouse Panthers, Marrickville RSL, Mascot Jets, Redfern All Blacks.
- **Metro Combined Silver** **East** (6 teams): All Saints Toongabbie Tigers, Blacktown City Bears, Forestville Ferrets, Leichhardt Wanderers, Penshurst RSL Kookaburras, Riverwood Legion.
  - Asquith Magpies were promoted from **Silver** to **Gold** during the season, first appearing in the **Gold** **East** competition in Round 7.
- **Macarthur** (6 teams from Sydney, 2 teams from the Illawarra & South Coast regions):
  - Sydney: Camden Rams, Campbelltown City Kangaroos, Campbelltown Collegians Collie Dogs, East Campbelltown Eagles, Mittagong Lions, Narellan Jets.
  - Illawarra & South Coast: Corrimal Cougars, Stingrays of Shellharbour.

2023
In a change from the previous season (2022), a Southern Corridor Women's Tackle competition was established.

- **Metro Combined Gold** (10 teams): Asquith Magpies, Forestville Ferrets, Marrickville RSL, Mascot Jets, Milperra Colts, Mounties, Redfern All Blacks, St Clair Comets, St Marys Saints, Wentworthville Magpies.
- **Metro Combined Silver** (8 teams): All Saints Toongabbie Tigers, Glenmore Park Brumbies, Hills District Bulls, Leichhardt Wanderers, Narraweena Hawks, Penrith (two teams, Pink & White), St Christopher’s.
- **Macarthur** (7 teams): Camden Rams, Campbelltown City Kangaroos, Campbelltown Collegians Collie Dogs, East Campbelltown Eagles, Minto Cobras, Mittagong Lions, Narellan Jets.
- **Southern Corridor** (3 teams from Sydney, 7 teams from the Illawarra & South Coast regions):
  - Sydney: Como Jannali Crocodiles, Penshurst RSL Kookaburras, Riverwood Legion.
  - Illawarra & South Coast: Corrimal Cougars, Jamberoo Superoos, Milton-Ulladulla Bulldogs, Mt Kembla Lowries, Nowra-Bomaderry Jets, Stingrays of Shellharbour, Warilla-Lake South Gorillas.

2024
In the 2024 season, four open-age women's rugby league competitions featured teams from Sydney.

- **Metro Combined Gold** (6 teams): All Saints Toongabbie Tigers, Mounties, Narraweena Hawks, Redfern All Blacks, St Christopher’s, Wentworthville Magpies.
  - A 13-a-side competition ran from 14 April to a grand final on 23 June 2024.
  - A nines competition ran from 7 July to a grand final on 8 September 2024. Only four of the six teams participated, with Narraweena and Redfern not playing in this nines competition.
- **Metro Combined Silver** (10 teams): Alexandria Rovers, Cabramatta Two Blues, Forestville Ferrets, Guildford Owls, Hills District Bulls, Lalor Park, Leichhardt Wanderers, Marrickville RSL, Mascot Jets, Pennant Hills Cherrybrook Stags.
  - The competition ran from 28 April to a grand final on 7 September 2024.
- **Macarthur** (9 teams): Camden Rams, Campbelltown City Kangaroos, Campbelltown Collegians Collie Dogs, Glenquarie All Stars (two teams, 1 and 2), Minto Cobras, Narellan Jets, The Oaks Tigers, Warragamba Wombats.
  - The competition ran in two phases.
    - The first ran from Round 1 on 28 April to Round 8 on 18 May, followed by semi-finals, preliminary finals and grand finals on 15 June 2024.
      - Glenquarie All Stars entered a second team which played its first game in Round 6.
    - The second phase ran from Round 9 on 29 June to Round 15 on 18 August, followed by semi-finals, a preliminary final, and a grand final on 14 September 2024.
      - Campbelltown City Kangaroos did not play in this second phase.
- **Southern Corridor** (4 teams from Sydney, 3 teams from the Illawarra & South Coast regions):
  - Sydney: Como Jannali Crocodiles, Penshurst RSL Kookaburras, Riverwood Legion, Taren Point Titans.
  - Illawarra & South Coast: Corrimal Cougars, Illawarra Collegians Collie Dogs, Western Suburbs Red Devils.

== Clubs by name ==
Teams that participated in the SMWRL prior to the 2016 season include:

- Auburn
- Blacktown
- Cabramatta Two Blues
- Canley Vale Kookas
- Canterbury Bulldogs
- East Campbelltown Eagles
- Guildford Owls
- Hawkesbury Hawkes
- Nepean
- Newtown Jetettes
- Windsor Wolves
- Renown United
- Riverwood Legion 1995
- Sydney Bulls

== See also ==
- Rugby league in New South Wales
- New South Wales Women's Rugby League
- Queensland Women's Rugby League
- Western Australian Women's Rugby League
