= 2018 Warrington Wolves season =

- Super League XXIII Rank: 4th
- Challenge Cup: Runners Up
- 2018 record: Wins: 17; draws: 1; losses: 10
- Points scored: For: 717; against: 504

Team information
- Chairman: Steven Broomhead
- Head Coach: Steve Price
- Captain: Chris Hill
- Stadium: Halliwell Jones Stadium
- Avg. attendance: 10,070
- High attendance: 12,268 v St. Helens (09/03/2018)
- Low attendance: 8,032 v Catalans (10/08/2018)

Top scorers
- Tries: Lineham = 18
- Goals: Roberts = 30
- Points: Ratchford = 90
← 2017	List of seasons	2019 →

This article details the Warrington Wolves Rugby League Football Club's 2018 season. This is the Wolves' 23rd consecutive season in the Super League.

== Results ==
=== Pre-season ===
LEGEND
Win
Draw
Loss

Date	Competition	Vrs	H/A	Venue	Result	Score	Tries	Goals	Att
29/12/2017	Friendly	Widnes Vikings	Away	Select Security Stadium	Lost	22-26	J.Johnson, T. King (2), Moran	Livett (2), Patton	3,116
13/01/2018	Friendly	Rochdale Hornets	Away	Crown Oil Arena	Won	24-10	L.Johnson, Livett, King, Prell	Goodwin (4)	644
20/01/2018	Friendly	Salford Red Devils	Home	Halliwell Jones Stadium	Won	18-6	Philbin, Ratchford, Atkins	Livett (3)	3,208

=== Betfred Super League ===
==== League table ====
Pos	Team	Pld	W	D	L	PF	PA	PD	Pts	Qualification
1	St. Helens	23	21	0	2	713	298	+415	42	Super League Super 8s
2	Wigan Warriors	23	16	0	7	573	345	+228	32	Super League Super 8s
3	Castleford Tigers	23	15	1	7	567	480	+87	31	Super League Super 8s
4	Warrington Wolves	23	14	1	8	531	410	+121	29	Super League Super 8s
5	Huddersfield Giants	23	11	1	11	427	629	−202	23	Super League Super 8s
6	Hull F.C.	23	11	0	12	534	544	−10	22	Super League Super 8s
7	Wakefield Trinity	23	10	1	12	581	506	+75	21	Super League Super 8s
8	Catalans Dragons	23	10	1	12	488	531	−43	21	Super League Super 8s
9	Leeds Rhinos	23	8	2	13	441	527	−86	18	The Qualifiers
10	Hull KR	23	8	1	14	476	582	−106	17	The Qualifiers
11	Salford Red Devils	23	7	0	16	384	597	−213	14	The Qualifiers
12	Widnes Vikings	23	3	0	20	387	653	−266	6	The Qualifiers

Source: Rugby League Project

==== Super League results ====
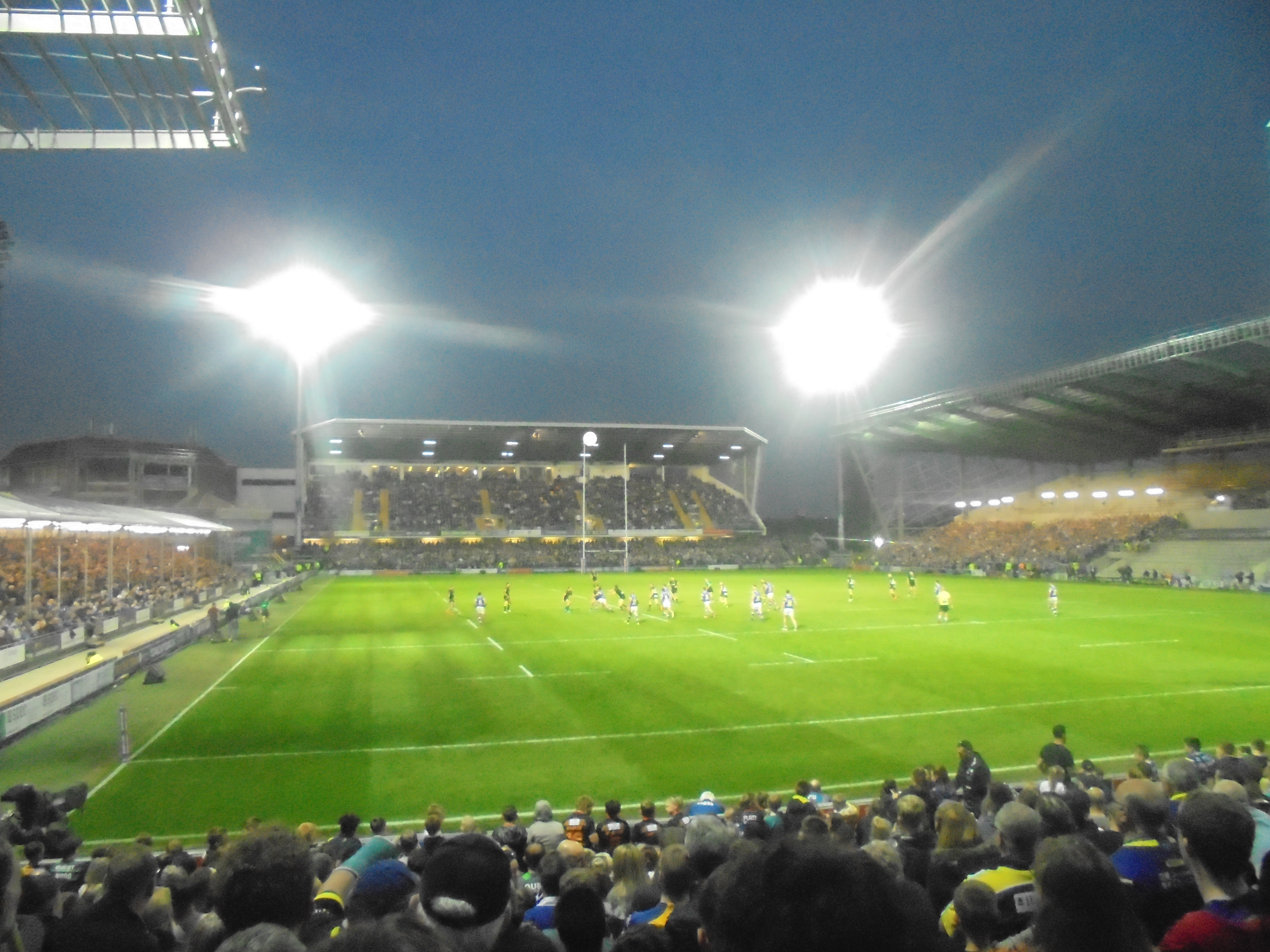
Warrington away at Leeds Rhinos, 4th May

Date	Round	Vrs	H/A	Venue	Result	Score	Tries	Goals	Att	Live on TV
01/02/2018	Round 1	Leeds Rhinos	Home	Halliwell Jones Stadium	Lost	12-16	Goodwin, Lineham	Goodwin (2)	11,241	Sky Sports
08/02/2018	Round 2	Huddersfield Giants	Away	John Smiths Stadium	Lost	6-20	Lineham	Goodwin	5,104	
16/02/2018	Round 12	Widnes Vikings	Away	Select Security Stadium	Won	18-10	Atkins (2), Ratchford	Goodwin (3)	7,009	Sky Sports
23/02/2018	Round 3	Wigan Warriors	Home	Halliwell Jones Stadium	Won	16-10	Lineham, Atkins	Goodwin (4)	12,012	Sky Sports
02/03/2018	Round 4	Hull FC	Away	Kingston Communication Stadium	Lost	12-21	Hughes, Atkins	Ratchford (2)	10,051	Sky Sports
09/03/2018	Round 5	St. Helens	Home	Halliwell Jones Stadium	Lost	12-30	T. King, Livett	Ratchford (2)	12,268	Sky Sports
17/03/2018	Round 6	Catalans Dragons	Away	Stade Gilbert Brutus	Won	26-0	M. Brown, Clark, Murdoch-Masila (2), Livett	Goodwin (3)	6,585	Sky Sports
23/03/2018	Round 7	Wakefield Trinity	Home	Halliwell Jones Stadium	Won	34-24	Lineham (3), Goodwin, Cooper, Murdoch-Masila	Goodwin (2), Ratchford (3)	9,154	
30/03/2018	Round 8	Widnes Vikings	Home	Halliwell Jones Stadium	Won	32-18	T. King (2), Charnley (2), Westwood, Akauola	Goodwin (4)	12,175	
02/04/2018	Round 9	Castleford Tigers	Away	Mend-A-Hose Jungle	Won	18-6	T. King, Clark	Ratchford (5)	6,881	
07/04/2018	Round 10	Salford Red Devils	Away	AJ Bell Stadium	Won	22-6	T. King, Charnley, Roberts, Brown	Ratchford (3)	3,428	Sky Sports
14/04/2018	Round 11	Hull Kingston Rovers	Home	Halliwell Jones Stadium	Won	40-26	Cooper, Hughes (2), Currie, Lineham, Ratchford, Atkins	Ratchford (6)	9,305	
27/04/2018	Round 13	Huddersfield Giants	Home	Halliwell Jones Stadium	Won	38-4	Charnley (3), Ratchford (2), Lineham, Livett, Philbin	Goodwin, Ratchford, Livett	8,792	
04/05/2018	Round 14	Leeds Rhinos	Away	Emerald Headingley Stadium	Won	33-22	Brown, Livett (3), Atkins, Murdoch-Masila	Goodwin, Ratchford (3) - Roberts (DG)	11,749	Sky Sports
19/05/2018	Round 15	Wigan Warriors	Magic	St James Park, Newcastle United FC	Lost	10-38	Livett, Ratchford	Goodwin	38,881	Sky Sports
25/05/2018	Round 16	Hull FC	Home	Halliwell Jones Stadium	Won	30-12	Livett, Brown, Murdoch-Masila, Charnley, Atkins	Livett (5)	8,646	Sky Sports
08/06/2018	Round 17	Castleford Tigers	Home	Halliwell Jones Stadium	Lost	30-34	Roberts, Ratchford, Clark, Akauola, Charnley (2)	Livett (2), Goodwin	9,198	Sky Sports
17/06/2018	Round 18	Wakefield Trinity	Away	Mobile Rocket Stadium	Won	32-30	Ratchford (2), Lineham, Brown	Livett (5), Goodwin (3)	5,034	
29/06/2018	Round 19	Salford Red Devils	Home	Halliwell Jones Stadium	Won	30-14	Akauola, Lineham, Charnley, King, Clark, Cooper	Goodwin (3)	9,171	
06/07/2018	Round 20	Wigan Warriors	Away	DW Stadium	Lost	12-13	King, Lineham, Charnley		13,249	Sky Sports
12/07/2018	Round 21	Catalans Dragons	Home	Halliwell Jones Stadium	Drew	22-22	Goodwin, Charnley, Livett	Roberts (6)	8,807	Sky Sports
20/07/2018	Round 22	Hull Kingston Rovers	Away	KC Lightstream Stadium	Won	34-20	Cooper, Ratchford, Roberts, T. King, Brown, Patton	Roberts (5)	7,045	
26/07/2018	Round 23	St. Helens	Away	Totally Wicked Stadium	Lost	12-14	Clark	Roberts (4)	12,454	Sky Sports

=== Super 8s ===
==== Super 8s table ====
Pos	Team	Pld	W	D	L	PF	PA	PD	Pts	Qualification
1	St. Helens (L)	30	26	0	4	895	408	+487	52	Semi-finals
2	Wigan Warriors (C)	30	23	0	7	740	417	+323	46	Semi-finals
3	Castleford Tigers	30	20	1	9	767	582	+185	41	Semi-finals
4	Warrington Wolves	30	18	1	11	767	561	+206	37	Semi-finals
5	Wakefield Trinity	30	13	1	16	747	696	+51	27	
6	Huddersfield Giants	30	13	1	16	539	794	−255	27	
7	Catalans Dragons	30	12	1	17	596	750	−154	25	
8	Hull F.C.	30	11	0	19	615	787	−172	22	

Source: Rugby League Project
(C) Champions; (L) League Leaders' Shield Winners

==== Super 8s results ====
Date	Round	Vrs	H/A	Venue	Result	Score	Tries	Goals	Att	Live on TV
10/08/2018	Round 1	Catalans Dragons	Home	Halliwell Jones Stadium	Won	56-6	Charnley, Lineham (3), M. Brown, K. Brown, Roberts, T. King, Patton, Philbin	Patton (8)	8,032	
17/08/2018	Round 2	Castleford Tigers	Away	Mend-A-Hose Jungle	Lost	18-28	Ratchford (2), Goodwin	Ratchford (2), Patton	7,142	Sky Sports
30/08/2018	Round 3	Hull F.C.	Home	Halliwell Jones Stadium	Won	80-10	Charnley (2), T. King (2), Goodwin (5), Hughes, Philbin, Roberts, Lineham, Ratchford	Roberts (12)	8,101	Sky Sports
07/09/2018	Round 4	Huddersfield Giants	Home	Halliwell Jones Stadium	Won	26-24	Goodwin (2) Atkins, Ratchford, Lineham	Roberts (3)	9,076	
14/09/2018	Round 5	Wigan Warriors	Away	DW Stadium	Lost	6-26	Ratchford	Patton	12,372	Sky Sports
22/09/2018	Round 6	St. Helens	Home	Halliwell Jones Stadium	Lost	14-34	K. Brown, T. King, Goodwin	Patton	10,747	Sky Sports
28/09/2018	Round 7	Wakefield Trinity	Away	Mobile Rocket Stadium	Won	36-23	Murdoch-Masilla, T. King, Ratchford, Hughes, Patton, Atkins	Patton (6)	4,140	

==== Play-offs ====
Date	Round	Vrs	H/A	Venue	Result	Score	Tries	Goals	Att	Live on TV
04/10/2018	Semi Final	St. Helens	Away	Totally Wicked Stadium	Won	18-13	Hughes, Lineham (2)	Roberts (3)		Sky Sports
13/10/2018	Grand Final	Wigan Warriors	N	Old Trafford	Lost	4-12	Charnley		64,892	Sky Sports

=== Ladbrokes Challenge Cup ===
Date	Round	Vrs	H/A	Venue	Result	Score	Tries	Goals	Att	Live on TV
21/04/2018	Round 5	Bradford Bulls	Home	Halliwell Jones Stadium	Won	54-6	Hill, Currie (2), Goodwin (3), Charnley (4)	Ratchford (3), Goodwin (4)	4,710	
13/05/2018	Round 6	Toronto Wolfpack	Home	Halliwell Jones Stadium	Won	66-10	Cooper, Charnley (2), Livett, Murdoch-Masila (2), Hughes, Westwood, Lineham (3), Roberts	Goodwin (9)	6,507	BBC Two
02/06/2018	Quarter Final	Wigan Warriors	Home	Halliwell Jones Stadium	Won	23–0	Brown, Murdoch-Masila, Charnley, Patton	Livett (2), Roberts (1) +1 DG	10,213	BBC One
05/08/2018	Semi Final	Leeds Rhinos	N	University of Bolton Stadium	Won	48-12	Lineham (2), Charnley (2), K. Brown, Murdoch-Masila, T. King, Goodwin	Roberts (8)	26,086	BBC One
25/08/2018	Final	Catalans Dragons	N	Wembley Stadium	Lost	14-20	Murdoch-Masila, G. King	Roberts (3)	50,672	BBC One

== Transfers ==
=== In ===
Player	Signed from	Contract length	Announced
(New Zealand) Sitaleki Akauola	Penrith Panthers	2 Years	August 2017
(New Zealand) Bryson Goodwin	South Sydney Rabbitohs	2 Years	October 2017
(Australia) Tyrone Roberts	Gold Coast Titans	3 Years	October 2017
(New Zealand) Ben Murdoch-Masila	Salford Red Devils	3 Years	October 2017
(Australia) Mitch Brown	Leigh Centurions	1 Year	November 2017
(England) Luis Johnson	Castleford Tigers	4 Year	December 2017
(England) Josh Charnley	Sale Sharks	3 Years	March 2018
(Australia) Ben Pomeroy	Lézignan Sangliers	6 months	May 2018
(New Zealand) Bodene Thompson	Leigh Centurions	6 months	July 2018

=== Out ===
Player	Signed for	Contract length	Announced
(Australia) Kurt Gidley	Retired	-	September 2017
(England) Brad Dwyer	Leeds Rhinos	2 Years	2017
(England) Rhys Evans	Leigh Centurions	3 Years	2017
(England) Andre Savelio	Brisbane Broncos	2 Years	2017
(Australia) Ashton Sims	Toronto Wolfpack	2 Years	2017
(England) Sam Wilde	Widnes Vikings	2 Years	2017
(England) Matty Blythe	Retired	-	2017
(England) Kevin Penny	Retired	-	2017
(England) Joe Westerman	Toronto Wolfpack	3 Years	2017
(New Zealand) Peta Hiku	Vodafone Warriors	3 Years	October 2017
(England) Will Dagger	Hull KR	2 Years	October 2017
(France) Benjamin Jullien	Catalans Dragons	2 Years	November 2017
