= 2020 Harvey Norman NSW Women's Premiership =

2020 NSW Women's Premiership
- League: NSW Women's Premiership
- Teams: 7

2020 season

The 2020 Harvey Norman NSW Women's Premiership will be the sixteenth season of the NSW Women's Premiership, the top tier women's rugby league competition administered by the New South Wales Rugby League. The competition acts as a second-tier league to the NRL Women's Premiership teams.

== Teams ==
In 2020, due to an initial COVID-19 postponement, an adjusted competition will take place. 7 clubs will field teams in the NSW Women's Premiership.

- Canterbury-Bankstown Bulldogs
- Central Coast Roosters
- Cronulla-Sutherland Sharks
- North Sydney Bears
- South Sydney Rabbitohs
- Wentworthville Magpies
- Wests Tigers

== Ladder ==
Pos	Club	Played	Wins	Drawn	Lost	Byes	For	Against	Diff.	Points
1	Central Coast Roosters	6	5	1	0	1	122	34	88	13
2	Cronulla-Sutherland Sharks	6	5	0	1	1	98	58	40	12
3	North Sydney Bears	6	2	1	3	1	102	60	42	7
4	Wests Tigers	6	2	1	3	1	76	76	0	7
5	Canterbury-Bankstown Bulldogs	6	2	1	3	1	66	100	-34	7
6	South Sydney Rabbitohs	6	2	1	3	1	46	94	-48	7
7	Wentworthville Magpies	6	0	1	5	1	32	120	-88	3

== Results ==
=== Round 1 ===
Home	Score	Away	Match Information	
Home	Score	Away	Date and Time	Venue
North Sydney Bears	8–8	Wests Tigers	18 July, 12:00pm	North Sydney Oval – Field 2
Canterbury-Bankstown Bulldogs	0–22	Central Coast Roosters	18 July, 1:00pm	Terry Lamb Complex – Field 1
Wentworthville Magpies	14–22	Cronulla-Sutherland Sharks	19 July, 11:00am	Ringrose Park – Field 1
South Sydney Rabbitohs	BYE			

=== Round 2 ===
Home	Score	Away	Match Information	
Home	Score	Away	Date and Time	Venue
Cronulla-Sutherland Sharks	18–10	North Sydney Bears	25 July, 11:00am	Cronulla High School – Field 1
Central Coast Roosters	32–8	South Sydney Rabbitohs	25 July, 1:30pm	Darren Kennedy Oval – Field 1
Wentworthville Magpies	4–14	Canterbury-Bankstown Bulldogs	25 July, 4:00pm	Ringrose Park – Field 1
Wests Tigers	BYE			

=== Round 3 ===
Home	Score	Away	Match Information	
Home	Score	Away	Date and Time	Venue
South Sydney Rabbitohs	14–4	Wentworthville Magpies	1 August, 12:00pm	Erskineville Oval – Field 1
North Sydney Bears	16–18	Canterbury-Bankstown Bulldogs	1 August, 12:00pm	North Sydney Oval – Field 2
Central Coast Roosters	20–4	Wests Tigers	2 August, 11:30am	Morry Breen Oval – Field 1
Cronulla-Sutherland Sharks	BYE			

=== Round 4 ===
Home	Score	Away	Match Information	
Home	Score	Away	Date and Time	Venue
Cronulla-Sutherland Sharks	16–0	South Sydney Rabbitohs	8 August, 11:00am	Cronulla High School – Field 1
North Sydney Bears	30–0	Wentworthville Magpies	8 August, 12:00pm	North Sydney Oval – Field 2
Canterbury-Bankstown Bulldogs	20–32	Wests Tigers	8 August, 4:00pm	Hammondville Oval – Field 1
Central Coast Roosters	BYE			

=== Round 5 ===
Home	Score	Away	Match Information	
Home	Score	Away	Date and Time	Venue
Wentworthville Magpies	10-10	Central Coast Roosters	15 August, 11:00am	Campbelltown Sports Stadium - Field 1
Wests Tigers	4-16	Cronulla-Sutherland Sharks	15 August, 3:00pm	Campbelltown Sports Stadium – Field 1
South Sydney Rabbitohs	0-0*	Canterbury-Bankstown Bulldogs	17 August, 7:00pm	NSWRL Centre of Excellence - Field 1
North Sydney Bears	BYE			

*The NSWRL abandoned this match with 26 minutes remaining due to a player sustaining a serious injury. The match was deemed a draw.

=== Round 6 ===
Home	Score	Away	Match Information	
Home	Score	Away	Date and Time	Venue
South Sydney Rabbitohs	0-32	North Sydney Bears	22 August, 12:00pm	Erskineville Oval – Field 1
Cronulla-Sutherland Sharks	6-22	Central Coast Roosters	22 August, 1:00pm	Cronulla High School – Field 1
Wests Tigers	24-0	Wentworthville Magpies	24 August, 7:00pm	NSWRL Centre of Excellence - Field 1
Canterbury-Bankstown Bulldogs	BYE			

=== Round 7 ===
Home	Score	Away	Match Information	
Home	Score	Away	Date and Time	Venue
Canterbury-Bankstown Bulldogs	8-14	Cronulla-Sutherland Sharks	29 August, 3:30pm	Hammondville Oval - Field 1
Central Coast Roosters	16-6	North Sydney Bears	30 August, 12:00pm	Morry Breen Oval – Field 1
Wests Tigers	4-12	South Sydney Rabbitohs	30 August, 1:00pm	TG Milner Field – Field 1
Wentworthville Magpies	BYE			

== Finals Series ==
Final	Home	Score	Away	Match Information	
Final	Home	Score	Away	Date and Time	Venue
ELIMINATION SEMI-FINALS
EF1	North Sydney Bears	24-0	South Sydney Rabbitohs	5 September, 11:00am	Campbelltown Sports Stadium - Field 1
EF2	Wests Tigers	20-10	Canterbury-Bankstown Bulldogs	5 September, 3:00pm	Campbelltown Sports Stadium - Field 1
QUALIFICATION AND ELIMINATION MATCHES
QF	North Sydney Bears	16-4	Wests Tigers	12 September, 11:00am	Campbelltown Sports Stadium - Field 1
SF	Central Coast Roosters	13-12	Cronulla-Sutherland Sharks	12 September, 3:00pm	Campbelltown Sports Stadium - Field 1
GRAND FINAL QUALIFIER
PF	Cronulla-Sutherland Sharks	10-16	North Sydney Bears	19 September, 3:00pm	Leichhardt Oval - Field 1
GRAND FINAL
GF	Central Coast Roosters	16-10	North Sydney Bears	27 September, 1:15pm	Bankwest Stadium - Field 1

== Grand Final ==
Date: Sunday 27 September
Time: 1:15pm (AEST)

Central Coast Roosters	16-10	North Sydney Bears
16	Match Report	10

Venue: Bankwest Stadium - Field 1
Referee: Referee: Karra-Lee Nolan,

Touch Judges: Cameron Turner, Dillan Wells

In Goal Judges: Paul Eden, Luke Saldern

== See also ==
- Rugby League Competitions in Australia
