= 2019 Warrington Wolves season =

- Super League XXIV Rank: 4th
- Challenge Cup: Winners
- 2019 record: Wins: 16; draws: 0; losses: 13
- Points scored: For: 709; against: 533

Team information
- Chairman: Stuart Middleton
- Head Coach: Steve Price
- Captain: Chris Hill, Jack Hughes
- Stadium: Halliwell Jones Stadium
- Avg. attendance: 11,007
- High attendance: 14,211 v St. Helens (28/06/2019)
- Low attendance: 8,635 v Wakefield (21/06/2019)

Top scorers
- Tries: Austin (18)
- Goals: Ratchford (84)
- Points: Ratchford (184)
← 2018	List of seasons	2020 →

This article details the Warrington Wolves Rugby League Football Club's 2019 season. This is the Wolves' 24th consecutive season in the Super League.

== Results ==
=== Pre-season friendlies ===
LEGEND
Win
Draw
Loss

Date	Competition	Vrs	H/A	Venue	Result	Score	Tries	Goals	Att
20/01/2019	Ryan Atkins Testimonial	Widnes Vikings	Home	Halliwell Jones Stadium	Won	38-12	Mamo, Austin, Patton, D. Clark, Lineham, Charnley	Ratchford (5)	5,605
26/01/2019	Friendly	Rochdale Hornets	Away	Crown Oil Arena	Won	24-20	Dean, Anglin, Akauola, Abram	Dean (4)	736

=== Super League ===
==== Table ====
Pos	Team	Pld	W	D	L	PF	PA	PD	Pts	Qualification
1	St. Helens (C, L)	29	26	0	3	916	395	+521	52	Semi Final
2	Wigan Warriors	29	18	0	11	699	539	+160	36	Qualifying Final
3	Salford Red Devils	29	17	0	12	783	597	+186	34	Qualifying Final
4	Warrington Wolves	29	16	0	13	709	533	+176	32	Elimination Final
5	Castleford Tigers	29	15	0	14	646	558	+88	30	Elimination Final
6	Hull F.C.	29	15	0	14	645	768	−123	30	
7	Catalans Dragons	29	13	0	16	553	745	−192	26	
8	Leeds Rhinos	29	12	0	17	650	644	+6	24	
9	Wakefield Trinity	29	11	0	18	608	723	−115	22	
10	Huddersfield Giants	29	11	0	18	571	776	−205	22	
11	Hull KR	29	10	0	19	548	768	−220	20	
12	London Broncos (R)	29	10	0	19	505	787	−282	20	Relegated to Championship

(C) Champions; (L) League Leaders' Shield Winners; (R) Relegated

==== Super League results ====
LEGEND
Win
Draw
Loss

Date	Competition	Vrs	H/A	Venue	Result	Score	Tries	Goals	Att	TV
02/02/2019	Round 1	Leeds Rhinos	Home	Halliwell Jones Stadium	Won	26-6	Austin, Charnley, D. Clark, Ratchford	Ratchford (5)	13,098	Sky Sports
09/02/2019	Round 2	Hull KR	Home	Halliwell Jones Stadium	Won	28-14	Charnley, Cooper, Lineham, Livett (2)	Ratchford (4)	10,515	
22/02/2019	Round 3	Huddersfield Giants	Away	John Smiths Stadium	Won	32-20	Atkins (2), Charnley (2), Austin, Murdoch-Masila	Ratchford (4)	6,076	
02/03/2019	Round 4	Catalans Dragons	Away	Stade Gilbert Brutus	Lost	23-22	Atkins, Clark, Patton, Ratchford	Ratchford (3)	8,158	Sky Sports
07/03/2019	Round 5	Castleford Tigers	Home	Halliwell Jones Stadium	Won	24-10	Hughes, Murdoch-Masila, Mamo (2),	Ratchford (4)	9,231	Sky Sports
15/03/2019	Round 6	Wigan Warriors	Home	Halliwell Jones Stadium	Won	25-12	Charnley, Mano, Hughes, Ratchford	Ratchford (4), Patton (1DG)	13,106	Sky Sports
21/03/2019	Round 7	Wakefield Trinity	Away	Mobile Rocket Stadium	Won	34-32	Austin, Charnley (2), Hill, King	Ratchford (7)	4,753	Sky Sports
29/03/2019	Round 8	Hull F.C.	Away	KCOM Stadium	Won	63-12	Austin (4), Charnley (3), Lineham (2), D. Clark, Murdoch-Masila	Ratchford (9), Austin (1DG)	10,810	Sky Sports
05/04/2019	Round 9	London Broncos	Home	Halliwell Jones Stadium	Won	48-12	Lineham (3), Charnley, Austin (2), J.Clark, Ratchford, Atkins	Ratchford (6)	11,718	
12/04/2019	Round 10	St. Helens	Away	Totally Wicked Stadium	Lost	38-12	Austin, D. Clark	Ratchford (2)	17,078	Sky Sports
19/04/2019	Round 11	Salford Red Devils	Home	Halliwell Jones Stadium	Lost	36-12	Austin, Goodwin	Ratchford (2)	11,867	
22/04/2019	Round 12	Hull KR	Away	KCOM Craven Park	Won	54-6	Austin, Lineham (2), Philbin (2), Goodwin, Charnley, King, Akauola	Ratchford (9)	7,111	
28/04/2019	Round 13	Huddersfield Giants	Home	Halliwell Jones Stadium	Won	50-19	Currie, Austin (2), Hill, Goodwin (2), D. Clark, Murdoch-Masilla,	Ratchford (9)	10,445	
03/05/2019	Round 14	Castleford Tigers	Away	Mend-A-Hose Jungle	Won	26-14	Cooper, King (2), Currie	Ratchford (5)	5,323	Sky Sports
18/05/2019	Round 15	Hull F.C.	Home	Halliwell Jones Stadium	Lost	12-19	King, Austin	Ratchford (2)	10,600	
25/05/2019	Round 16	Wigan Warriors	N	Anfield	Won	26-14	Patton, Austin, King	Patton (7)	30,057	Sky Sports
06/06/2019	Round 17	Catalans Dragons	Home	Halliwell Jones Stadium	Won	34-4	Clark, Austin, Goodwin, Akauola, Charnley	Patton (7)	10,015	Sky Sports
15/06/2019	Round 18	Hull KR	Away	KCOM Craven Park	Lost	14-16	Goodwin, Charnley	Patton (3)	7,390	
21/06/2019	Round 19	Wakefield Trinity	Home	Halliwell Jones Stadium	Won	30-6	Currie, Charnley, Cooper, Austin, J. Johnson	Patton (5)	8,635	
28/06/2019	Round 20	St. Helens	Home	Halliwell Jones Stadium	Lost	10-21	Mamo	Patton (3)	14,211	Sky Sports
06/07/2019	Round 21	London Broncos	Away	Trailfinders Sports Ground	Won	36-6	Lineham, Cooper, Goodwin, Mamo, Hughes, King	Patton (6)		
12/07/2019	Round 22	Salford Red Devils	Home	Halliwell Jones Stadium	Lost	12-22	Davies, Clark	Patton (2)	9,509	
21/07/2019	Round 23	Castleford Tigers	Away	Mend-A-Hose Jungle	Lost	18-27	Mamo, Lineham, King	Patton (3)	6,965	
03/08/2019	Round 24	Catalans Dragons	Away	Stade Gilbert Brutus	Lost	10-30	Mamo, Hill	Ratchford	9,634	Sky Sports
09/08/2019	Round 25	St. Helens	Home	Halliwell Jones Stadium	Lost	12-30	Mamo, Thewlis	Ratchford (2)	10,987	Sky Sports
16/08/2019	Round 26	Wigan Warriors	Away	DW Stadium	Lost	6-20	Lineham	Patton	12,555	Sky Sports
01/09/2019	Round 27	Salford Red Devils	Away	AJ Bell Stadium	Lost	6-22	Walker	Ratchford	4,879	Sky Sports
06/09/2019	Round 28	Wakefield Trinity	Home	Halliwell Jones Stadium	Won	23-16	Clark, Currie, Charnley, Goodwin	Ratchford (3) FG Patton	10,158	
13/09/2019	Round 29	Leeds Rhinos	Away	Emerald Headingley Stadium	Lost	4-26	Charnley		14,085	

==== Play-offs ====
LEGEND
Win
Draw
Loss

Date	Competition	Vrs	H/A	Venue	Result	Score	Tries	Goals	Att	TV
19/09/2019	Elimination	Castleford Tigers	Home	Halliwell Jones Stadium	Lost	12-14	Mamo, Hill	Ratchford (2)	5,627	Sky Sports

=== Challenge Cup ===
LEGEND
Win
Draw
Loss

Date	Competition	Vrs	H/A	Venue	Result	Score	Tries	Goals	Att	TV
12/05/2019	Round 6	Wigan Warriors	Home	Halliwell Jones Stadium	Won	26-24	Goodwin, Hughes, Clark, Atkins	Ratchford (5)	7,086	BBC Sport
31/05/2019	Quarter Final	Hull KR	Away	KCOM Craven Park	Won	28-22	Mamo, Austin, Lineham, Murdoch-Masila, Currie	Patton (4)	3,311	
27/07/2019	Semi Final	Hull F.C.	N	University of Bolton Stadium	Won	22-14	Goodwin, Currie, King, Philbin	Ratchford (3)	24,364	BBC Sport
24/08/2019	Final	St. Helens	N	Wembley Stadium	Won	18-4	Philbin, Murdoch-Masila, Clark	Ratchford (3)	62,717	BBC Sport

== Transfers ==
=== In ===
Player	Signed from	Contract length	Announced
(Australia) Blake Austin	Canberra Raiders	3 Years	July 2018
(Australia) Jason Clark	South Sydney Rabbitohs	2 Years	June 2018
(England) Matt Davis	London Broncos	2 Years	June 2018
(Samoa) Lama Tasi	Salford Red Devils	1 Year	October 2018
(England) Danny Walker	Widnes Vikings	3 Years	October 2018
(Australia) Jake Mamo	Huddersfield Giants	1 Year	November 2018

=== Out ===
Player	Signed for	Contract length	Announced
(Australia) Tyrone Roberts	Gold Coast Titans	2 Years	July 2018
(Australia) Ben Pomeroy	Saint-Estève	1 Year	September 2018
(England) George King	Wakefield Trinity	2 Years	September 2018
(Australia) Mitch Brown			September 2018
(New Zealand) Bodene Thompson	Toronto Wolfpack	1 Year	October 2018
(England) Dom Crosby	Leeds Rhinos	3 Years	October 2018
