= New South Wales Women =

New South Wales Women may refer to various sporting teams, tournaments, and organisations in the state of New South Wales, Australia, including:

- National Premier Leagues NSW Women's, an association football competition in NSW, subdivision of the National Premier Leagues Women's
- New South Wales Breakers, the NSW Women cricket team
- New South Wales Women's Amateur Championship, the state amateur golf championship
- New South Wales Women's Baseball League, the state baseball league
- New South Wales Women's Rugby League, the governing body of rugby league in NSW
- New South Wales women's rugby league team, the rugby league team
- Women's NSW Open, a women's professional golf tournament
