= Simone Smith (rugby league) =

Australia international rugby league footballer

Personal information
- Born: 8 April 1993 (age 33) Kempsey, New South Wales, Australia
- Height: 166 cm (5 ft 5 in)
- Weight: 74 kg (11 st 9 lb)

Playing information
- Position: Halfback, Five-eighth
Club
Years	Team	Pld	T	G	FG	P
2019	Sydney Roosters	1	0	0	0	0
2020–	New Zealand Warriors	2	1	0	0	4
	Total	3	1	0	0	4
Representative
Years	Team	Pld	T	G	FG	P
2016–20	Indigenous All Stars	3	0	0	0	0
2017	Australia	1	0	0	0	0
- Source: RLP As of 19 November 2020

Simone Smith (born 8 April 1993) is an Australian rugby league footballer who plays for the New Zealand Warriors in the NRL Women's Premiership. Born in Kempsey, New South Wales and raised in Port Macquarie, Smith is of Indigenous Australian descent.

Primarily a halfback, she is an Australian and Indigenous All Stars representative.

== Playing career ==
In 2016, while playing for the Port City Breakers, Smith represented the Indigenous All Stars. In February 2017, she again represented the Indigenous All Stars.

On 5 May 2017, Smith made her Test debut for Australia, starting at halfback in a 16–4 win over New Zealand. A knee injury later in the year, which later her forced her to undergo a reconstruction, saw her miss the 2017 Women's Rugby League World Cup.

In May 2019, Smith represented NSW Country at the Women's National Championships. On 26 June 2019, she signed with the Sydney Roosters NRL Women's Premiership team.

On 10 August 2019, she came off the bench and scored a try in CRL Newcastle's NSWRL Women's Premiership Grand Final win over Mounties RLFC. In Round 2 of the 2019 NRL Women's season, Smith made her debut for the Roosters in their 0–20 loss to the Brisbane Broncos.

On 22 February 2020, Smith made her third appearance for the Indigenous All Stars, starting at five-eighth in a 10–4 win over the Maori All Stars. On 18 September 2020, Smith joined the New Zealand Warriors NRLW team. In Round 1 of the 2020 NRL Women's season, she made her debut for the Warriors, scoring a try in a 14–28 loss to the Brisbane Broncos.
