= 2019 Harvey Norman NSW Women's Premiership =

2019 NSW Women's Premiership
- League: NSW Women's Premiership
- Teams: 11

2019 season

The 2019 Harvey Norman NSW Women's Premiership will be the fifteenth season NSW Women's Premiership, the top tier women's rugby league competition administered by the New South Wales Rugby League. The competition acts as a second-tier league to the NRL Women's Premiership teams.

== Teams ==
In 2019, 11 clubs will field teams in the NSW Women's Premiership.

- Cabramatta Two Blues
- Canterbury-Bankstown Bulldogs
- CRL Newcastle
- Cronulla-Sutherland Sharks
- Mount Pritchard Mounties
- North Sydney Bears
- Penrith Brothers
- South Sydney Rabbitohs
- St Marys Saints
- Wentworthville Magpies
- Wests Tigers

== Ladder ==
2019 Harvey Norman NSW Women's Premiership
Pos	Team	Pld	W	D	L	B	PF	PA	PD	Pts
1	North Sydney Bears	7	7	0	0	3	116	64	+52	20
2	Mount Pritchard Mounties	7	6	0	1	3	164	56	+108	18
3	CRL Knights	7	5	0	2	3	162	50	+112	16
4	Cronulla-Sutherland Sharks	7	5	0	2	3	156	80	+76	16
5	Wentworthville Magpies	6	3	0	3	4	142	94	+48	14
6	South Sydney Rabbitohs	6	3	0	3	4	114	94	+20	14
7	Cabramatta Two Blues	6	2	0	3	4	106	130	−24	12
8	St Marys Saints	6	2	0	3	4	94	124	−30	12
9	Wests Tigers	6	2	0	3	4	64	102	−38	12
10	Penrith Brothers	6	0	0	6	4	14	228	−214	8
11	Canterbury-Bankstown Bulldogs	6	0	0	6	3	34	144	−110	6

== Results ==
=== Round 1 ===
Home	Score	Away	Match Information	
Home	Score	Away	Date and Time	Venue
Cabramatta Two Blues	Bye	Canterbury-Bankstown Bulldogs		
CRL Newcastle	Bye	Cronulla-Sutherland Sharks		
Mount Prichard Mounties	Bye	North Sydney Bears		
Penrith Brothers	Bye	South Sydney Rabbitohs		
St Marys Saints	Bye	Wentworthville Magpies		
Wests Tigers	Bye			

=== Round 2 ===
Home	Score	Away	Match Information	
Home	Score	Away	Date and Time	Venue
Canterbury-Bankstown Bulldogs	4–22	Wentworthville Magpies	23 March 2019, 11:30	Belmore Sports Ground
Cabramatta Two Blues	48–4	Penrith Brothers	23 March 2019, 13:00	New Era Stadium
CRL Newcastle	20–0	Wests Tigers	23 March 2019, 18:00	Dudley Oval
Mount Prichard Mounties	30–0	St Marys Saints	23 March 2019, 18:45	Aubrey Keech Reserve
Cronulla-Sutherland Sharks	10–14	North Sydney Bears	23 March 2019, 19:00	Cronulla High School
Bye: South Sydney Rabbitohs

=== Round 3 ===
Home	Score	Away	Match Information	
Home	Score	Away	Date and Time	Venue
Cronulla-Sutherland Sharks	–	St Marys Saints	30 March 2019, 10:00	Cronulla High School
Mount Prichard Mounties	–	CRL Newcastle	30 March 2019, 18:30	Aubrey Keech Reserve
Wentworthville Magpies	–	North Sydney Bears	31 March 2019, 11:00	Ringrose Park
Penrith Brothers	–	Wests Tigers	31 March 2019, 11:30	Hickey's Park Rugby League Complex
South Sydney Rabbitohs	–	Canterbury-Bankstown Bulldogs	31 March 2019, 16:05	ANZ Stadium
Bye: Cabramatta Two Blues

=== Round 4 ===
Home	Score	Away	Match Information	
Home	Score	Away	Date and Time	Venue
	–			
	–			
	–			
	–			
	–			
Bye:

=== Round 5 ===
Home	Score	Away	Match Information	
Home	Score	Away	Date and Time	Venue
Cabramatta Two Blues	Bye	Canterbury-Bankstown Bulldogs		
CRL Newcastle	Bye	Cronulla-Sutherland Sharks		
Mount Prichard Mounties	Bye	North Sydney Bears		
Penrith Brothers	Bye	South Sydney Rabbitohs		
St Marys Saints	Bye	Wentworthville Magpies		
Wests Tigers	Bye			

=== Round 6 ===
Home	Score	Away	Match Information	
Home	Score	Away	Date and Time	Venue
Cabramatta Two Blues	Bye	Canterbury-Bankstown Bulldogs		
CRL Newcastle	Bye	Cronulla-Sutherland Sharks		
Mount Prichard Mounties	Bye	North Sydney Bears		
Penrith Brothers	Bye	South Sydney Rabbitohs		
St Marys Saints	Bye	Wentworthville Magpies		
Wests Tigers	Bye			

=== Round 7 ===
Home	Score	Away	Match Information	
Home	Score	Away	Date and Time	Venue
	–			
	–			
	–			
	–			
	–			
Bye:

=== Round 8 ===
Home	Score	Away	Match Information	
Home	Score	Away	Date and Time	Venue
	–			
	–			
	–			
	–			
	–			
Bye:

=== Round 9 ===
Home	Score	Away	Match Information	
Home	Score	Away	Date and Time	Venue
	–			
	–			
	–			
	–			
	–			
Bye:

=== Round 10 ===
Home	Score	Away	Match Information	
Home	Score	Away	Date and Time	Venue
	–			
	–			
	–			
	–			
	–			
Bye:

=== Round 11 ===
Home	Score	Away	Match Information	
Home	Score	Away	Date and Time	Venue
Cabramatta Two Blues	Bye	Canterbury-Bankstown Bulldogs		
CRL Newcastle	Bye	Cronulla-Sutherland Sharks		
Mount Prichard Mounties	Bye	North Sydney Bears		
Penrith Brothers	Bye	South Sydney Rabbitohs		
St Marys Saints	Bye	Wentworthville Magpies		
Wests Tigers	Bye			

=== Round 12 ===
Home	Score	Away	Match Information	
Home	Score	Away	Date and Time	Venue
Cabramatta Two Blues	Bye	Canterbury-Bankstown Bulldogs		
CRL Newcastle	Bye	Cronulla-Sutherland Sharks		
Mount Prichard Mounties	Bye	North Sydney Bears		
Penrith Brothers	Bye	South Sydney Rabbitohs		
St Marys Saints	Bye	Wentworthville Magpies		
Wests Tigers	Bye			

=== Round 13 ===
Home	Score	Away	Match Information	
Home	Score	Away	Date and Time	Venue
	–			
	–			
	–			
	–			
	–			
Bye:

=== Round 14 ===
Home	Score	Away	Match Information	
Home	Score	Away	Date and Time	Venue
Cabramatta Two Blues	Bye	Canterbury-Bankstown Bulldogs		
CRL Newcastle	Bye	Cronulla-Sutherland Sharks		
Mount Prichard Mounties	Bye	North Sydney Bears		
Penrith Brothers	Bye	South Sydney Rabbitohs		
St Marys Saints	Bye	Wentworthville Magpies		
Wests Tigers	Bye			

=== Round 15 ===
Home	Score	Away	Match Information	
Home	Score	Away	Date and Time	Venue
	–			
	–			
	–			
	–			
	–			
Bye:

=== Round 16 ===
Home	Score	Away	Match Information	
Home	Score	Away	Date and Time	Venue
	–			
	–			
	–			
	–			
	–			
Bye:

=== Round 17 ===
Home	Score	Away	Match Information	
Home	Score	Away	Date and Time	Venue
	–			
	–			
	–			
	–			
	–			
Bye:

== Finals Series ==
Home	Score	Away	Match Information	
Home	Score	Away	Date and Time	Venue
QUALIFYING AND ELIMINATION FINALS
	–			
	–			
	–			
	–			
SEMI-FINALS
	–			
	–			
PRELIMINARY FINALS
	–			
	–			
GRAND FINAL
	–			

Qualifying and elimination finals
1
4
5
8
6
7
2
3

Semi-finals

Preliminary finals

Grand final

== Grand Final ==
TBD	v	TBD

== See also ==
- Rugby League Competitions in Australia
