= Brisbane and District Women's Rugby League =

Australian women's rugby league

- Current season or competition: 2015 BDWRL season
- Sport: Rugby league
- Instituted: 2004
- Inaugural season: 2004 BDWRL season
- Number of teams: 14
- Premiers: Souths Logan Women's Rugby League Club (2013)
- Website: Brisbane and District Women's Rugby League
- Related competition: Sydney Metropolitan Women's Rugby League

The Brisbane and District Women's Rugby League is one of the main Women's rugby league competitions in Australia.

== History ==
The Brisbane and District Women's Rugby League started in 2004

== Brisbane and District Women's Rugby League Clubs ==
- Beerwah Women's Rugby League Club
- Browns Plains Bears Women's Rugby League Club
- Burleigh Bears
- Burpengary Women's Rugby League Club
- Cannon Hill Stars Women's Rugby League Club
- Carina Tigers Women's Rugby League Club
- Northern Suburbs Women's Rugby League Club
- Normanby Rugby League Football Club
- Pine Rivers Women's Rugby League Club
- Southern Suburbs Women's Rugby League Club
- Sunshine Coast Sirens
- Springfield Panthers Women's Rugby League Club
- Souths Logan Women's Rugby League Club
- Swifts RLFC
- Toowoomba Fillies
- Waterford RLFC
- Wests Inala FC
- Wynnum Manly Women's Rugby League Club

== Premiers ==
=== Division 1 ===
The following list is incomplete.

Year	Premiers	Score	Runners-up	Reference
1998	Souths Magpies			
1999	Souths Magpies			
2002	Brothers Ipswich	32 — 8	Aspley	
2003	Toowoomba Fillies	38 — 10	Brothers Ipswich	
2004	Toowoomba Fillies	40 — 6	Kedron Wavell	
2005	Wests Centenary	36 — 10	Brothers Ipswich	
2009	Souths Logan Magpies		Sunshine Coast Sirens	
2010	Souths Logan Magpies	52 — 12	Runaway Bay Seagulls	
2011	Souths Logan Magpies			
2012	Souths Logan Magpies	16 — 4	Springfield	
2013	Souths Logan Magpies		Burleigh Bears	
2014	Souths Logan Magpies	26 — 12	Beerwah	
2015	Burleigh Bears	24 — 10	Souths Logan Magpies	
2016	Burleigh Bears	28 — 10	Souths Logan Magpies	
2017	Burleigh Bears	10 — 6	Brothers Ipswich	
2018	Burleigh Bears	14 — 0	Wests Panthers	
2019	Wests Panthers	20 — 4	Burleigh Bears	
2020	Burleigh Bears	28 — 10	Souths Logan Magpies	
2020	Pine Central Hornets	26 — 14	Runaway Bay Seagulls	
2021	Runaway Bay Seagulls	26 — 10	Goodna Eagles	

In 2020 the QRL Women's Premiership was launched, a state-wide competition which included the leading Brisbane and South East Queensland clubs. This new competition's 2020 season was suspended after one playing round and subsequently cancelled due to the COVID-19 pandemic in Australia. A restructure resulted in two competitions being played. The five-team Holcim Cup included Burleigh Bears, Souths Logan Magpies, Easts Tigers, Tweed Seagulls and Wests Panthers. The three-team South East Queensland Women's Premiership included Carina, Pine Central Hornets and Runaway Bay Seagulls.

==== Competing Teams ====
In 1999 five teams competed: Brothers Ipswich, Goodna Eagles, Norths and Souths Magpies.
In 2002 five teams competed: Aspley, Brothers Ipswich, Goodna Eagles, Sunshine Coast Crushers and Toowoomba Fillies.
In 2003 fice teams competed: Brothers Ipswich, Goodna Eagles, Kedron Wavell Wildcats, Sunshine Coast Crushers and Toowoomba Fillies. In 2004 five teams competed: Brothers Ipswich, Caboolture, Kedron, Toowoomba Fillies and Tugun.
In 2005 four teams competed: Brothers Ipswich, Caboolture, Wests Centenary and Wests Mitchelton.
In 2009 six teams competed: Souths Logan, Wests Centenary, Sunshine Coast Sirens, Caboolture, Runaway Bay and Logan Brothers.
In 2013 ten teams competed in two divisions. Division 1: Souths Logan, Burleigh Heads, Beerwah, Wests Inana and Logan Brothers. Division 2: Aspley, Carina, Deception Bay Bombers, Wynnum-Manly Juniors and Swifts.
In 2014 fourteen teams competed in two divisions. Division 1: Souths Logan, Beerwah, Burleigh Heads, North Ipswich, Carina, Aspley. Division 2: Burpengary, Waterford, Toowoomba Fillies, Swifts, Wests Inala, Pine Rivers, Wynnum Manly Juniors, Capalaba.

=== Division 2 ===
The following list is incomplete.

Year	Premiers	Score	Runners-up	Reference
2013	Aspley Broncos			
2014	Burpengary	32 — 24	Toowoomba Fillies	
2015	Toowoomba Fillies	18 — 4	Waterford Demons	

== See also ==
- Rugby league in Queensland
- Queensland Women's Rugby League
- New South Wales Women's Rugby League
- Western Australian Women's Rugby League
