= 2000 Women's Rugby League World Cup squads =

Women's Rugby League World Cup squads

This article lists the squads for the 2000 Women's Rugby League World Cup.

The lists are derived from the Official Programme, supplemented by contemporary newspaper articles and the New Zealand Rugby League Almanack 2000. The Official Programme included pen portraits that named the occupation, position(s), club and past representative teams of most of the players.

== Australia ==
Australia played four matches in the tournament. Three players from Western Australia were selected and included in the touring party. Heritage numbers were identified in 2021. A contemporary newspaper article listed the playing 17 for Australia's second match (the third of the tournament).

The tally of tries and goals are from the first two matches involving Australia where the Australian scorers are known. The source for Australia's third match (against New Zealand) listed only the New Zealand scorers. Australia did not score in their fourth match (against Great Britain).

Heritage number	Name	Position	Club	State	Occupation	Debut	T	G	Pts
18	Loretta O'Neill	Fullback	Norths Brisbane	Qld	Police cadet	1995	0	0	0
46	Tracey Thompson	Wing	Norths Brisbane	NSW	Student	1999	0	0	0
39	Teresa Anderson	Centre	Souths Brisbane	Qld	Police constable	1998	0	0	0
32	Caryl Jarrett	Centre	South Sydney	NSW	Council worker	1997	1	0	4
51	Kelly O'Doherty	Wing	Souths Brisbane	Qld	Fitness instructor	2000	0	0	0
41	Karyn Murphy	Five-eighth, Stand-off	Souths Brisbane	Qld	Police detective	1998	1	0	4
7	Tarsha Gale	Halfback, Lock	South Sydney	NSW	School teacher	1995	0	0	0
22	Debbie Merritt	Prop	Norths Brisbane	Qld	Correctional K9 officer	1996	0	0	0
1	Natalie Dwyer	Halfback	South Sydney	NSW	Warehouse clerk	1995	0	0	0
49	Liz Ryan	Prop	Norths Brisbane	Qld	Maintenance worker	2000	0	0	0
42	Tahnee Norris	Second-row	Norths Brisbane	Qld	Administrator	1998	1	0	4
19	Veronica White	Second-row	Brothers Ipswich	Qld	Administrator	1995	0	0	0
29	Jodie Billing	Lock	Souths Brisbane	Qld	Student	1997	0	0	0
34	Karen Stuart	Hooker	Souths Brisbane	Qld	Carpenter	1997	0	0	0
6	Katrina Fanning	Prop	Queanbeyan	ACT	Public servant	1995	0	0	0
48	Tanya Mulder	interchange	Souths Brisbane	Qld	Printer artist	2000	0	0	0
53	Danielle Parker	Centre		WA		2000	0	0	0
50	Louise Snowling	interchange		WA	School teacher	2000	0	0	0
52	Nina Brocklehurst			WA		2000	0	0	0
54	Annie Banks	Halfback	Norths Brisbane	Qld	Property maintenance	2001	0	0	0
33	Karen Shaw	Centre		Qld		1997	0	2	4

A pre-tournament preview article in the Courier Mail named Karyn Murphy as co-captain. The Official Programme did not designate the Australian co-captains but did list the following support staff:

- Coach: Wayne Portlock
- Conditioner: Haydn Masters
- Manager: Jeanette Luker
- Assistant: Sue Taylor
- Strapper: Ray Ward

== Great Britain & Ireland ==
Great Britain & Ireland played four matches in the tournament. Contemporary newspaper articles list the playing 17 for Great Britain & Ireland's second and fourth matches (the third match of the tournament, and the Final).

Jersey number	Name	Position	Club	Occupation	Debut	T	G	Pts
1	Joanne Hewson	Fullback	Barrow	Candle operator	1996	0	0	0
2	Joanne Taylor	Wing, Centre	Hull Vixens	Detective constable		0	0	0
3	Allison Kitchin	Centre	Barrow	Business banker	1996	0	0	0
4	Natalie Gilmour	Centre	Wakefield Townville Panthers	Police officer	1998	2	0	8
5	Dannielle Titterington	Wing	Wakefield Townville Panthers	Window fabricator	2000	0	0	0
6	Brenda Dobek	Stand-off	Wakefield Townville Panthers	Self-employed caterer	1996	1	5	14
7	Kirsty Robinson	Halfback	Wakefield Townville Panthers	Bank HFS operations	1998	0	0	0
9	Michelle Land	Hooker	Wakefield Townville Panthers	Taxi driver	1996	2	0	8
10	Lisa McIntosh	Prop	Bradford Thunderbirds	Leisure centre manager	1996	0	0	0
11	Jane Banks	Loose forward, Second-row	Hindley Pumas	Postwoman	1996	1	0	4
12	Rebecca Stevens	Second-row	Wakefield Townville Panthers	Barrister	1998	0	0	0
13	Sally Millburn	Loose forward	Barrow	Postwoman	1996	0	0	0
14	Samantha Bailey	Halfback, Stand-off	Wakefield Townville Panthers	Student	2000	0	0	0
15	Wendy Charnley	Halfback	Rochdale Ravens	Mother	1996	0	0	0
16	Paula Tunnicliffe	Prop	Rochdale Ravens	Warehouse operative	1996	0	0	0
17	Debbie Rice	Fullback	Hull Dockers		2000	0	0	0
18	Sarah Roper	Prop	Goldborn	Student	2000	0	0	0
19	Michelle Handley	Prop	Wakefield Townville Panthers	Mother	2000	0	0	0
20	Alexandra Knight	Centre	University of Luton	Student		0	0	0
21	Gemma Walsh	interchange	Wakefield Townville Panthers	Student	2000	0	0	0
22	Kate Wright	Halfback	Barrow	PE teacher		0	0	0
23	Susan Cochrane	Second-row	Wakefield Townville Panthers	Psychriatic nurse		0	0	0
24	Teresa Bruce	Wing	Wakefield Townville Panthers	Warehouse operative	2000	0	0	0

The Official Programme noted Brenda Dobek and Michelle Land as joint-captains and listed the following support staff:

- Head Coach: Jackie Sheldon
- Technical Coaching Advisor: Ray Unsworth
- Conditioner: Simon Worsnop
- Team Manager: Julie Wells
- Team Manager: Andy MacDonald
- Event Co-ordinator: Roland Davis
- Team Administrator: Julia Lee

== New Zealand ==
New Zealand played four matches in the tournament. Heritage numbers were identified in 2021. A contemporary newspaper article listed the playing 17 for New Zealand's fourth match (the Final).

The Almanac included a short article, the scores from New Zealand's matches, New Zealand's try scorers and goal kickers and a tally of match appearances, tries, goals and points.

Heritage number	Name	Position	Club	Province	Occupation	Debut	M	T	G	Pts
4	Luisa Avaiki	Second-row, Prop	Richmond	Auckland		1995	4	0	0	0
6	Nadene Conlon	Second-row	Bay Roskill	Auckland	Family business	1995	4	0	0	0
34	Tasha Davie	Lock	Richmond	Auckland	Telecom business consultant	1998	4	0	0	0
8	Michelle Driscoll	Centre	Bay Roskill	Auckland	Events coordinator	1995	4	1	0	4
25	Trish Hina	Stand-off, Five-eighth	Te Aroha	Wellington		1997	4	2	8	24
45	Kat Howard	Fullback	Bay of Plenty	Bay of Plenty	Timber hand	2000	3	1	0	4
46	Sharlene Johnson	Wing	Bay Roskill	Auckland	Teacher	2000	3	1	0	4
47	Vicki Logopati	interchange	Kalapoi	Centerbury	Student	2000	1	1	0	4
48	Laura Mariu	Stand-off, Five-eighth	Otahuhu	Auckland	NZ Post	2000	4	2	2	12
49	Miriama Niha	Wing	Kalapoi	Centerbury	Purchasing officer	1999	4	1	0	4
14	Nicole Presland	Prop	Bay Roskill	Auckland	Financial consultant	1995	4	2	0	8
41	Stacey O'Carroll	Wing	Richmond	Auckland	Ford Motors quality assurance	1999	4	2	0	8
44	Frances Te Ao	Prop, Second-row	Petone	Wellington		1999	1	0	0	0
24	Selena Edmonds	Centre, Stand-off	Te Aroha	Wellington	Owner operator courier	1997	4	5	0	20
35	Somma Te Kahu	Centre, Wing	Papanui	Centerbury	Medical receptionist	1998	4	0	0	0
50	Hanna Wainohu	Second-row	Te Aroha	Wellington	ENZA Cool Ltd	2000	4	0	0	0
23	Leah Witehira	Halfback	Otahuhu	Auckland	Teachers aid	1995	4	1	0	4
21	Rachel White	Loose forward, Second-row	Bay Roskill	Auckland		1995	4	2	0	8
31	Tracy Wrigley	Hooker	Petone	Wellington	Student; hockey referee	1997	4	1	0	4
52	Nola Campbell	Centre, Wing, Fullback	Otahuhu	Auckland		2001	0	0	0	0
	Rachel Cooper	Loose forward, Second-row	Papanui	Centerbury	Family business		0	0	0	0
30	Priscilla Moke	Hooker, Halfback	Bay Roskill	Auckland		1997	0	0	0	0
57	Ina Muaiava	interchange	Bay Roskill	Auckland	Bank officer	2001	0	0	0	0
18	Lynley Tierney	Lock	Mt Wellington	Auckland		1995	0	0	0	0

The above table reflects player surnames used in the Kiwi Ferns Honour Roll. The Official Programme used the names Selena Te Amo (Edmonds), Nicole Presland-Tack and Lynley Tierney-Mani. The Official Programme listed the following support staff:

- Coach: Michael Rawiri
- Manager: Gavin Tavendale
- Trainer: Bob Vercoe
- Physiotherapist: Leah Purcell
- Media: Claudette Hauti
