= Paul Alamoti =

Tonga international rugby league player

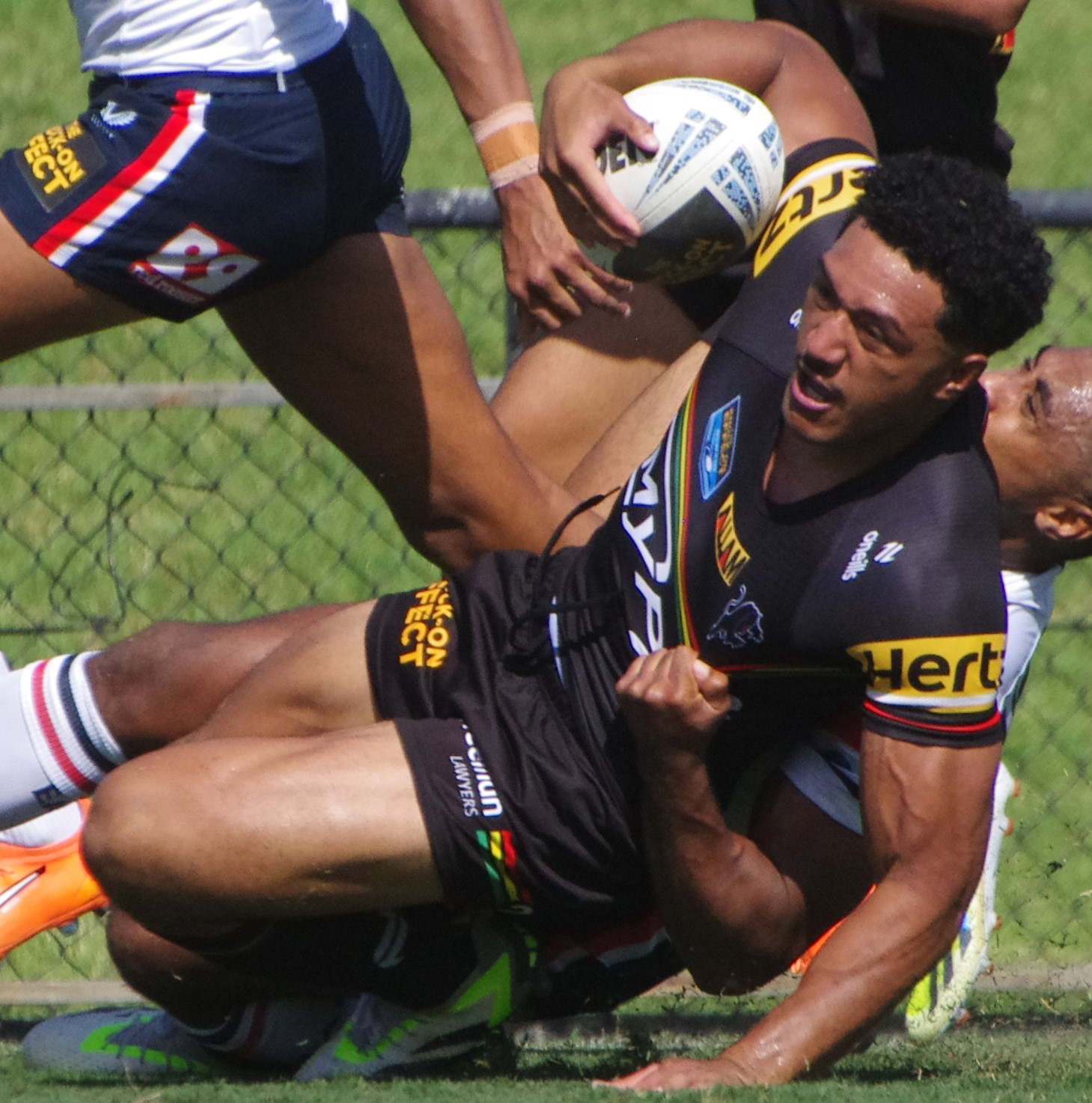

Personal information
- Full name: Paul Alamoti
- Born: 22 January 2004 (age 22) Sydney, New South Wales, Australia
- Height: 183 cm (6 ft 0 in)
- Weight: 98 kg (15 st 6 lb)

Playing information
- Position: Centre, Wing
Club
Years	Team	Pld	T	G	FG	P
2023	Canterbury Bulldogs	19	2	1	0	10
2024–	Penrith Panthers	56	29	46	0	208
	Total	75	31	47	0	218
Representative
Years	Team	Pld	T	G	FG	P
2024–26	Tonga	6	1	1	0	6
- Source: RLP As of 7 November 2026

Paul Alamoti (born 22 January 2004) is a Tonga international rugby league footballer who plays as a centre or winger for the Penrith Panthers in the National Rugby League (NRL).

He previously played for the Canterbury-Bankstown Bulldogs in the NRL. He has also represented New South Wales in the 2022 Under 19s State of Origin series.

== Background ==
Alamoti was born in Sydney, New South Wales and is of Tongan descent.

Educated at Marist College Kogarah where he also excelled in rugby union, basketball and athletics, Alamoti played his junior rugby league with the Milperra Colts, and played for the Bulldogs' Harold Matthews Cup and S. G. Ball Cup teams. In 2019, Alamoti was selected for the 2019 Australian Schoolboys merit team, and was also selected for the Harold Matthews Representative side. He also played for the Bulldogs' Jersey Flegg Cup side in 2021, at a remarkably young age of 17.

== Playing career ==
=== 2021 ===
On 17 March, Alamoti signed with the Canterbury-Bankstown Bulldogs until 2023.

=== 2022 ===
Alamoti made his debut for the Canterbury-Bankstown Bulldogs in round 7 of the 2022 Knock On Effect NSW Cup against the Mount Pritchard Mounties at Belmore Sports Ground. Alamoti was selected to represent New South Wales in the Under 19s State of Origin. Alamoti scored a try in the 18th minute, but later went off with a cheekbone injury in NSW's victory. He scored his first try with Canterbury against the North Sydney Bears in Round 21. Alamoti would appear in all matches for the Canterbury club during the 2022 NSW Cup finals series, including the club's grand final loss to the Penrith Panthers at CommBank Stadium.

On 7 November, Alamoti was named in the Bulldogs top 30 squad for 2023, extending his contract until the end of the 2024 season.

=== 2023 ===
In round 1 of the 2023 NRL season, Alamoti made his NRL debut for Canterbury in their 31-6 loss against Manly at Brookvale Oval. In round 7, Alamoti scored his first NRL try in Canterbury's 30-4 loss to arch-rivals the Parramatta Eels. In round 9, Alamoti kicked his first goal in Canterbury's 18-16 win over St. George Illawarra Dragons. Alamoti played 19 games for Canterbury in the 2023 NRL season as the club finished in a disappointing 15th place. On 12 September, it was announced that Alamoti had signed a one-year contract with Penrith starting in 2024.

=== 2024 ===
On March 17th, it was reported Alamoti had extended his contract with Penrith until the end of 2025. In round 7 of the 2024 NRL season, Alamoti made his club debut for Penrith and scored a try in their 22-6 win over Wests Tigers at Carrington Park. In Round 13, Alamoti kicked his first goal for Penrith in their 22-10 loss to St. George Illawarra. Alamoti played 16 games for Penrith in the 2024 NRL season as the club finished 2nd on the ladder. Alamoti played and scored a try in Penrith's 2024 NRL Grand Final victory over the Melbourne Storm, winning 14-6. In the 74th minute, he accused Melbourne player Cameron Munster of biting, resulting in Munster being placed on report, however, Munster was not charged by the NRL's match review committee. On 24 October, Penrith announced that Alamoti had re-signed with the club on a three-year deal.

=== 2025 ===
In round 3 of the 2025 NRL season, Alamoti scored two tries and kicked two goals in Penrith's 30-24 loss against Melbourne. In round 7, Alamoti scored two tries for Penrith in their 40-12 victory over the Sydney Roosters. In the 2025 elimination semi-final, Alamoti scored a hat-trick as Penrith defeated his old club Canterbury 46-26. Alamoti played a total of 19 games for Penrith in the 2025 NRL season and scored 17 tries as the club finished 7th on the table. Alamoti played in Penrith's narrow preliminary final loss against Brisbane.

=== 2026 ===
On 14 August, Penrith announced that Alamoti re-signed with the club until the end of 2029. Alamoti played 21 games for Penrith in the 2026 NRL season as the club claimed the minor premiership. He did not feature in the clubs finals campaign.

== Statistics ==
Year	Team	Games	Tries	Goals	Pts
2023	Canterbury-Bankstown Bulldogs	19	2	1	10
2024	Penrith Panthers	16	8	18	68
2025	Penrith Panthers	19	17	15	98
2026	Penrith Panthers	10	1	1	4
2027	Penrith Panthers				
	Totals	64	28	35	182
