= Queensland Women's Rugby League =

The Queensland Women's Rugby League is the governing body of female rugby league in Queensland, Australia. It is a member of the Australian Women's Rugby League and Queensland Rugby League. The organisation is responsible for administering the Queensland Women's rugby league team and Brisbane and District Women's Rugby League competition.

== Clubs ==
- Beerwah Women's Rugby League Club
- Blackwater Crushettes Rugby League Club
- Bluff Bunnies Women's Rugby League Club
- Browns Plains Bears Women's Rugby League Club
- Burleigh Heads Bears
- Burpengary Women's Rugby League Club
- Cannon Hill Stars Women's Rugby League Club
- Carina Tigers Women's Rugby League Club
- Clermont Bears Women's Rugby League Club
- Dysart Bulls Women's Rugby League Club
- Emerald Tigers Ladies Rugby League Club
- Middlemount Panthers Rugby League Club
- Normanby Women's Rugby League Club
- Northern Suburbs Ipswich Women's Rugby League Club
- Pine Rivers Women's Rugby League Club
- Southern Suburbs Women's Rugby League Club
- Sunshine Coast Sirens
- Springfield Panthers Women's Rugby League Club
- Souths Logan Women's Rugby League Club
- Swifts RLFC
- Toowoomba Fillies
- Waterford RLFC
- Wests Inala FC
- Wynnum Manly Women's Rugby League Club

== See also ==
- Rugby league in Queensland
- New South Wales Women's Rugby League
- Western Australian Women's Rugby League
