= Newtown Jetettes =

Club information
- Full name: Newtown Jetettes Womens Rugby League Club
- Nickname: Jetettes
- Founded: 2005

Current details
- Ground: Henson Park
- Competition: Sydney Metropolitan Women's Rugby League

The Newtown Jetettes was founded in 2005 Newtown Jetettes Women's Rugby League Club are an Australian professional Women's rugby league football team based in Newtown, New South Wales, a suburb of south-eastern Sydney. Newtown have Affiliations with the Newtown Jets and they played in the Sydney Metropolitan Women's Rugby League.

== See also ==
- List of rugby league clubs in Australia
