= Toowoomba Fillies =

Club information
- Full name: Toowoomba Fillies Women's Rugby League Club
- Nickname(s): Fillies
- Founded: 2003

Current details
- Ground(s): Clive Berghofer Stadium
- Competition: Brisbane and District Women's Rugby League

Founded in 2003, the Toowoomba Fillies Women's Rugby League Club, commonly referred to as Toowoomba Fillies, are an Australian professional women's rugby league football team based in Toowoomba, a city in South East Queensland west of Queensland's capital city, Brisbane. Toowoomba Fillies have affiliations with the Toowoomba Clydesdales and Queensland Rugby League South West Division they play in the Brisbane and District Women's Rugby League.
