= Milperra Colts =

Australian rugby league club, based in Milperra, NSW

Club information
- Full name: Milperra Colts Junior Rugby League Football Club
- Colours: Green; Black; White
- Founded: 1970; 56 years ago

Current details
- Ground: Killara Reserve, Milperra
- Competition: Canterbury Bankstown Rugby League

Records
- Premierships: 1 (1990)

Milperra Colts Junior Rugby League Football Club is an Australian rugby league football club based in Milperra, New South Wales. They have teams for both junior, senior men and women and women tag teams.

== Notable Juniors ==
- Greg Barwick (1988-95 Canterbury Bulldogs, Penrith Panthers & Sydney Tigers)
- Steve Price (1996-99 St George Dragons & Balmain Tigers)
- Justin Holbrook (1999-02 Newcastle Knights, Penrith Panthers & Sydney Roosters)
- Daniel Heckenberg (2000-02 St George Illawarra Dragons, Parramatta Eels & Manly Sea Eagles)
- Trent Cutler (2005-11 Canterbury Bulldogs)
- Tim Winitana (2007-10 Canterbury Bulldogs)
- Jayden Okunbor (2019 Canterbury Bulldogs)
- Paul Alamoti (2023- Canterbury Bulldogs, Penrith Panthers)
