= New South Wales Women's Rugby League =

- Current season or competition: 2016 SMWRL season
- Sport: Rugby league
- Website: Sydney Metropolitan Women's Rugby League
- Related competition: Sydney Metropolitan Women's Rugby League

The New South Wales Women's Rugby League is the governing body of female rugby league in New South Wales. It is a member of the Australian Women's Rugby League and New South Wales Rugby League. The organisation is responsible for administering the New South Wales Women's rugby league team, Women's City vs Country Origin, Sydney Metropolitan Women's Rugby League and Country Rugby League Women's RL competitions.

== Sydney Metropolitan Women's Rugby League Clubs ==
Team	Home Ground	Open Div 1	Open Div 2	Under 18's	Under 15's
Berala Bears	Peter Hislop Park		X	X	X
Berkeley Vale	Morry Breen Oval	X			
Chester Hill	Terry Lamb Complex		X	X	X
Cronulla-Caringbah Sharks	Cronulla High School	X		X	X
Forestville Ferrets	Forestville Park	X			
Glenmore Park Brumbies	Ched Towns Reserve		X	X	X
Greenacre Tigers	Roberts Park	X			
Hunter Stars	Cessnock Sportsground	X			
Maroubra	Snape Park		X		
Minchinbury	Mt Druitt Reserve		X	X	X
Mounties	Mt Pritchard Oval	X			
Penrith Waratahs	Doug Rennie Field		X		
Redfern All Blacks	Waterloo Oval	X			

== Illawarra Women's Rugby League Clubs ==
- Berkeley
- Corrimal
- Helensburgh Tiger Lillies
- Windang Juniors

== North West NSW Women's Rugby League Clubs ==
- Armidale Rams
- Bendemeer
- Gunnedah Panthers
- Enverell Sapphires
- Moree Boomerangs
- Tamworth

== Penrith Girls Competitions Rugby League Clubs ==
Games played in 9-a-side format with 20 minute halves

Two age groups: 1) U13 – 15 2) U16 – 18

- Doonside
- Glenmore Park
- Lower Mountains
- Minchinbury
- PCYC
- Quakers Hill
- St Clair
- Western City Tigers

== Parramatta Girls Competitions Rugby League Clubs ==
Games played in 9-a-side format Age groups: 1) U13 – 15

- Canley Heights
- Canley Vale
- Hills District
- Merrylands

== ACT Female Competitions Rugby League Clubs ==
U13 – U17 Girls & Open Women's Competitions

- Goulburn
- Gungahlin Bulls
- Tuggeranong Buffaloes
- Valley Dragons

Yass Westies Queanbeyan Blues Queanbeyan Roos

== See also ==
- Rugby league in New South Wales
- Queensland Women's Rugby League
- Western Australian Women's Rugby League
