= Berkeley Vale Panthers =

Australian rugby league club, based in Berkeley Vale, NSW

Berkeley Vale Panthers RLFC

Club information
- Full name: Berkeley Vale Panthers Rugby League Football Club
- Colours: Black; Green; Yellow; Red
- Founded: 1985; 41 years ago

Current details
- Ground: Ted Doyle Oval, Berkeley Vale
- Competition: Central Coast Rugby League
- 2022: 8th

Berkeley Vale Panthers Rugby League Club is an Australian rugby league football club based in Berkeley Vale, New South Wales. They enter and organise teams for both junior & senior rugby league.

In the seniors, the Panthers enter teams in all senior grades, including women's tackle and league tag. Junior age groups range from 6/under to 19/under, with boys and girls as young as 5yo eligible to register.

In senior men's rugby league, the club initially fielded a team in the 2nd Division of the Central Coast Division Rugby League. The club advanced to grade competitions in the 1990s, with teams in First Grade, Reserve Grade, Third Grade and Under 18's. Berkeley Vale won First Grade premierships in 2011 and 2013.

Berkeley Vale Rugby League Club, known as the family and community club in the district, had much excitement in the community when the club reached their first ever first grade grand final in 2010, 25 years after their inception. The Panthers lost 22-10.

The following year the men's team, coached by Tony Gleeson, won their maiden first grade premiership in 2011 defeating Ourimbah Magpies 38–18 at Morry Breen Oval. The Panthers made the finals the following year before winning another grand final in 2013, beating Erina Eagles 21–20. It was the most successful era in the club's history as they went on to be minor premiers in 2014, the first time the club had ever achieved the honour. They were beaten by Central Coast powerhouse Wyong Roos 8–6 in the grand final.

Berkeley Vale Panthers have been trailblazers in women's rugby league on the Central Coast, entering a team in a Sydney competition in 2014. They were the first Central Coast team to enter a women's tackle team. In 2015, the women, captained by Melanie Sutton, won the second division grand final 32–16 against Berala with Isabelle Kelly scoring five tries.

In recent years, their women's team won back to back premiership in 2018, 2019 & 2020 in the Newcastle A Grade competition, including a 32–4 win against Waratah-Mayfield in the 2018 decider. Berkeley Vale was also the first Central Coast club to field a women's tackle team in the Newcastle competition. Three Berkeley Vale Panther women debuted in the 2022 NRLW competition season.

In 2023, the Berkeley Vale Women won the inaugural Central Coast Women's tackle competition, defeating rivals The Entrance 18-4 in the grand final, with Madeline Watson named player of the match.

Junior development has also been a strong focus at the Panthers with the JET Rugby League Academy established in 2021. The academy is a high performance environment for boys and girls aged 10–18 to improve, with emphasis on individual and positional tuition.

The club signed former NRL player and coach of multiple country rugby league teams, Michael Sullivan to coach the men's first grade team.

== Notable Juniors ==
Notable First Grade Players that have played at Berkeley Vale Panthers include:

- Paul Stringer (1997–2006 North Sydney Bears, Northern Eagles, South Sydney Rabbitohs & Parramatta Eels)
- Nathan Hines (1997–99 North Sydney Bears & Manly Sea Eagles, Scottish Test Rugby 2000-11 & British Lions 2009)
- Rory Kostjaysn (2010–16 Melbourne Storm, North Queensland Cowboys & Ireland national rugby league team)
- Liam Knight (2016–22 Manly Sea Eagles, Canberra Raiders, South Sydney Rabbitohs & Canterbury-Bankstown Bulldogs)
- Adam Ashley-Cooper (Wallabies – 116 Tests)
- Blake Taaffe (2021–22 South Sydney Rabbitohs & Canterbury-Bankstown Bulldogs)
- Isabelle Kelly (2015–22 Australian Jillaroos and New South Wales Rugby League)
- Alex Moore (2003 Manly-Warringah Sea Eagles)

== Honours and Records ==
=== Team ===
- Premierships (2): 2011, 2013.
- Runners-up (2): 2010, 2014.
- Women's Tackle Premierships (5): 2015, 2018, 2019, 2020, 2023
- Reserve Grade Premierships Reserve Grade (2): 2010, 2014.
- Open Age Premierships (1): 2016.
- Under 19 Premierships (1): 2017.
- Under 17 Premierships (3): 2004, 2008, 2010.

20 Year Playing Service

6 players have reached this level of achievement:- Mitch Evrard, Andrew Lyons, Richard Lyons, Steve Lyons, Malcolm Parry and Tane Tutaki

== Team numbers ==
In 2022, the Berkeley Vale Panthers fielded 5 senior teams and 18 junior teams.

Team numbers obtained and compiled from competition tables and match results published in the newspapers, Central Coast Express, Wyong Shire Advocate and Central Coast Express Advocate. Full numbers not yet obtained for 2003 and 2011.

In 2023, the club's revival continued with junior numbers hitting an all-time high. There was also a dramatic increase in the number of teams in 2023 with 27 junior teams and 6 senior teams.
