= Steve Price (rugby league, born 1977) =

RL coach & former Australian professional rugby league footballer

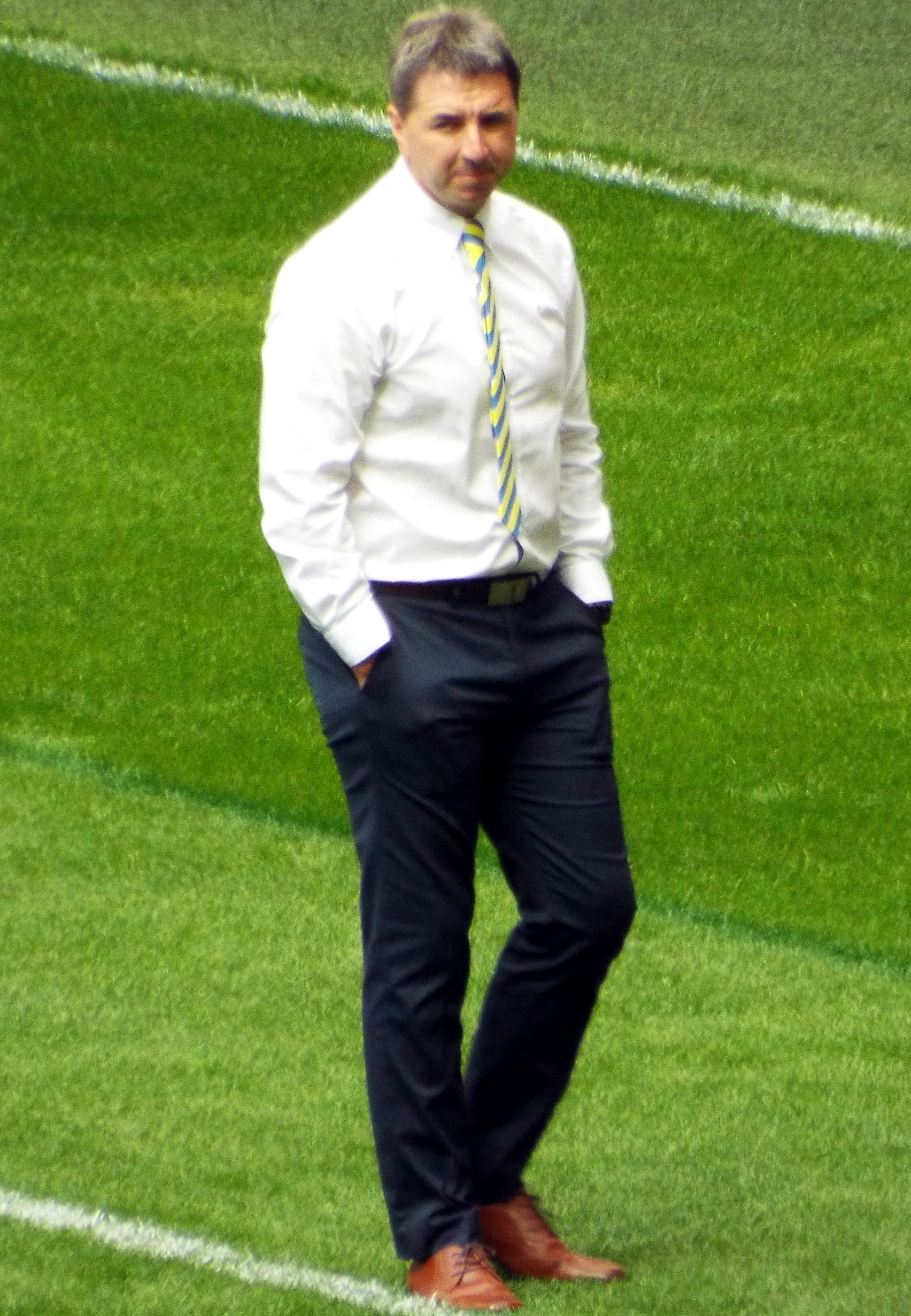

Personal information
- Full name: Steven John Price
- Born: 5 September 1977 (age 49) Revesby, New South Wales, Australia

Playing information
- Position: Five-eighth, Lock
Club
Years	Team	Pld	T	G	FG	P
1997	St. George Dragons	9	1	4	0	12
1999	Balmain Tigers	3	1	0	0	4
	Total	12	2	4	0	16

Coaching information
Club
Years	Team	Gms	W	D	L	W%
2012–14	St George Illawarra	58	21	0	37	36
2018–21	Warrington Wolves	102	63	2	37	62
	Total	160	84	2	74	53
Representative
Years	Team	Gms	W	D	L	W%
2010–13	Samoa	3	1	0	2	33
- Source: As of 10 June 2021

Steven John Price (born 5 September 1977) is an Australian professional rugby league football coach and former professional rugby league footballer. He is currently with the Cronulla-Sutherland Sharks as an assistant to head coach Craig Fitzgibbon.

He played as a five-eighth and lock for the St. George Dragons and the Balmain Tigers.

He was the head coach for the St. George Illawarra Dragons in the NRL between 2012 and May 2014, and Warrington Wolves in the Super League between 2018 and 2021. He coached Samoa between 2010 and 2013.

== Early life ==
Price was born in Revesby, New South Wales, Australia. His junior rugby league club was the Milperra Colts.

== Playing career ==
Price was part of the St George Dragons team between 1996 and 1998, and part of the Balmain Tigers team in 1999. His positions of choice were at Five-Eighth and at lock. However two knee injuries ended his playing career early.

== NRL coaching career ==
=== Jersey Flegg and Premier League ===
Price began his coaching career with the St. George Illawarra Dragons in 2002 as the Dragons' Jersey Flegg assistant coach.

In 2003 he was the Dragons' Premier League assistant coach.

In 2004 Price was promoted and became the coach of the Dragons Jersey Flegg team with whom he won the 2005 title. During that premiership win, he coached well established rugby league footballers such as; Jason Nightingale, Josh Morris, Beau Ryan, Daryl Millard, George Ndaira, Chris Houston, Lee Te Maari, Charlie Leaeno, Danny Wicks and James Grehan.

During the 2006 and 2007 season he was the head coach for the Dragons' Premier League team.

=== Toyota Cup ===
Throughout 2008 and 2009 Price was the head coach of the Under 20's Toyota Cup team in the National Youth Competition. The team did not miss the finals series in either of his years in charge of the U20's side, however, his team did not win a premiership. In both 2008 and 2009 his team fell just one game short of a grand final appearance, losing in the preliminary finals in both years to the Canberra Raiders and subsequently the Wests Tigers. However, his time at this level helped develop rugby league players that proved valuable to the NRL side, in juniors such as; Kyle Stanley, Cameron King, and 2010 NRL Premiership player Trent Merrin.

=== NRL assistant coach ===
In 2010 Price's coaching role for the unders 20s team was taken over by Adrian Lam and he was promoted to become the club's assistant coach under Wayne Bennett, being part of the coaching staff when they won the 2010 NRL Premiership.

In 2010 he was appointed to become the head coach of the Samoan national side. He was replaced in 2011 by Daniel Anderson.

In 2011 he coached the Dragons in their pre-season win against South Sydney in the 2011 Charity Shield while Wayne Bennett was coaching the NRL All Stars.

Ahead of the 2011 World Club Challenge on 27 February 2011 at DW Stadium England against the 2010 Super League premiers, the Wigan Warriors, Bennett returned to Australia to be with his ill mother-in-law, leaving Price in charge. Dragons went on to win the game 21–15 in front of 24,268 fans.

On 30 March 2011, it was confirmed that Price would be promoted to head coach on a two-year contract when current head coach Wayne Bennett announced his departure. Upon departing from the Dragons; Bennett hailed the appointment of Price, who was one of only two staff he kept at the club when he took charge in 2009. "I'm really proud for Steve that he's got the opportunity," he said. "He deserves it. He's been a great assistant to me and he's got the respect of everybody there in the playing group so I'm elated for him. "It's the way it should work." "He knows what works. He's seen it now, he's lived it," Bennett said. "He'll have his personality, put his own pieces to it, but the end result is he knows what works." "There is no reason why he should be daunted by the task." "I wouldn't be if I was his age." "When I came to the Dragons there was only two staff that I kept here and he was one of them," Bennett said. "I made a few inquiries and everywhere I went, the ex-players and current players, they all had a wrap on him. I'm as confident as I can be about anybody."

=== NRL head coach ===
Upon Price taking over the head coaching role, replacement staff were immediately hired to fill the void left by staff leaving with Wayne Bennett to the Newcastle Knights. Steve Folkes was appointed to become assistant coach. Former referees' boss Robert Finch a premiership winning player with the St. George Dragons was appointed to be the new operations manager, taking over from Paul Massey. Andrew Gray who has worked for the Dragons since 1999 as the head physiotherapist will assume the role of High Performance Director which was left vacant by the departure of Jeremy Hickmans. Also joining the club's Performance Department to deliver its Speed and Acceleration Program in 2012 is Australian former gold medallist sprinter Matt Shirvington.

In May 2014, following several embarrassing defeats to start the season, Price was dismissed as head coach of the Dragons, and replaced by assistant coach, Paul McGregor, who was eventually employed full-time.

== Super League coaching career ==
In October 2017, Super League club Warrington Wolves announced Price as head coach on a two-year deal.

He coached the Warrington Wolves in the 2018 Challenge Cup Final defeat by the Catalans Dragons at Wembley Stadium.

He coached the Warrington Wolves in the 2018 Super League Grand Final defeat by the Wigan Warriors at Old Trafford.

In 2019, he led Warrington to the 2019 Challenge Cup Final victory over St. Helens at Wembley Stadium.

In the 2020 Super League season, Price guided Warrington to a third-placed finish on the table. However, they were eliminated from the first week of the playoffs losing to Hull F.C.

In the 2021 Super League season, Warrington finished in third place on the table. However, just like the 2020 season, the club were eliminated from week one of the playoffs losing to Hull Kingston Rovers 19–0. It was also the final game in charge for Price.

== Personal life ==
Price resides in the Southern Sydney suburb of Caringbah.

He is the brother of WBU Cruiserweight boxing champion Danny Price.

In an interview with the BBC in October 2018, Price stated being a supporter of Manchester City, with a particular admiration of Pep Guardiola.
