= Cronulla High School =

Location
- Cronulla in Southern Sydney, New South Wales, Australia; 34°02′21″S 151°09′29″E

Information
- Type: Government-funded co-educational comprehensive and specialist secondary day school
- Motto: Latin: Caritas Humilitas Dignitas (Charity Humility Dignity)
- Established: 1961; 65 years ago
- School district: Sutherland; Metropolitan South
- Educational authority: New South Wales Department of Education
- Principal: Tony Ibrahim
- Staff: ~110
- Years: 7–12
- Enrolment: ~1,300 (2019)
- Campus type: Suburban
- Colors: Green and white
- Website: cronulla-h.schools.nsw.gov.au

Cronulla High School (abbreviated as Cronulla HS) is a government-funded co-educational comprehensive and specialist secondary day school that is located in Cronulla, a southern suburb of Sydney, New South Wales, Australia. The school was established in 1961, and has an enrolment of approximately 1,300 students from the grades Year 7 to Year 12.

Cronulla High School has a close proximity to the Tasman Sea and Botany Bay, located in a relatively large local catchment area with a large enrolment of roughly 1,300 students. The school is operated by the New South Wales Department of Education; the current principal is Tony Ibrahim.

== History ==
=== Establishment of Cronulla High School ===
The school was established and first built in 1961 under the name of Cronulla High School in the Southern Sydney suburb of Cronulla. The land was previously used as a sand mining ground, as it used to be sand dunes. After a while the land was put up for sale, which was later bought by the NSW Government after the site had finished mining and as the decision was made to build a secondary school. This decision was made to decrease the travel distance and time to other secondary schools, since some of the surrounding suburbs continued to expand and become more populated from an increasing rate of development and housing.

== Co-curriculum ==
Cronulla High School offers programs including athletics, Aussie Rules Swan Shield, Australian rules football, rugby league, rugby union, soccer, triathlon, softball, water polo, volleyball, swimming, surfing, cricket, baseball, netball, music, drama, dance, computing, creative arts, mathematics, science, languages, technology, industrial and engineering.

The school features a developed Performing Arts Program and a Targeted Surfing Program.

== Campus facilities ==
=== Facilities ===
==== Block A ====
- Main office (Level 1)
- 3 deputy principal offices (Level 1)
- Principals office (Level 1)
- Councillors office (Level 1)
- Careers office (Level 2)
- Learning support room (Level 1)
- Medical care room (Level 1)
- HSIE staff room (Level 2)
- 2 Computer rooms (Level 1)
- 5 HSIE rooms (Level 2)

==== Block B ====
- English staff room (Level 2)
- Science staff room (Level 1)
- 2 Japanese rooms (Level 2)
- 5 English rooms (Level 2)
- 3 Science lab rooms (Level 1)
- 2 Science theory rooms (Level 1)

==== Block C (Music Building) ====
- 2 Music rooms
- Instrumental store room

==== Block D ====
- Mathematics staff room (Level 2)
- Creative and Performing Arts staff room (Level 2)
- Home Economics & Languages staff room (Level 1)
- 2 Textiles rooms (Level 2)
- 2 Visual Arts rooms (Level 2)
- 2 Food Technology rooms (Level 1)
- 2 General classrooms (Level 2)
- 2 Science labs (Level 1)

==== Block E ====
- Technology staff room
- 2 Timber workshop rooms
- 1 Metal workshop room
- 1 Engineering workshop room
- 1 Industrial Technology theory room

==== Block F (School Halls) ====
The school has two halls that are conjoined together that have changing rooms, which was formerly one hall until the completion of the second hall in 2024, in which that hall 2 can be used as an extension of hall 1.

==== Block I (Performing Arts Studio) ====
- Dance studio room
- Drama studio room

==== Block M ====
- Canteen (Level 1)
- Toilets (Level 1)
- Staff common room (Level 1)
- PDHPE staff room (Level 1)
- Sports store room (Level 1)
- 6 General classrooms (Level 2)

==== Block P ====
- 12 General demountable classrooms in 2024
- 1 Music demountable classroom
- 1 Food Technology demountable classroom

==== Library ====
- Library office (Level 2)
- Multimedia classroom (Level 1)
- 1 Computing Studies classroom (Level 3)
- Computing Studies staff room (Level 3)
- 2 Senior Study rooms (Level 3)
- 2 General classrooms (Level 4)

==== Recreational area ====
The recreational area contains two Football fields and two Basketball courts, as well as extra grass space.

== Notable alumni ==
- Russell Aitken – (Former professional rugby league footballer who played for the NRL Cronulla-Sutherland Sharks and Melbourne Storm, as well as other rugby league teams such as Newcastle Thunder in the UK and AS Carcassonne in France, Aitken was the head coach of the NRL St. George Illawarra Dragons)
- Jaime Chapman – (Professional rugby league footballer who plays for the NRLW Gold Coast Titans and also has previously played for the Brisbane Broncos and St. George Illawarra Dragons)
- Quincy Dodd – (Professional rugby league footballer who plays for the NRLW Cronulla-Sutherland Sharks and also has previously played for the St. George Illawarra Dragons and Sydney Roosters)
- Tony Graham – (Former professional rugby league footballer who played for the NRL Cronulla-Sutherland Sharks and the NSWRL St. George Dragons)
- Andrew Kerr – (Former Australian water polo player who competed in the Summer Olympics multiple times)
- Kathy Lette – (Best-Selling author and co-author of Puberty Blues)
- Mark Occhilupo – (Australian professional surfer and a presenter on Fuel TV Australia who won the 1999 ASP World title)
- Tyrone Peachey – (Former professional rugby league footballer who played for the NRL Cronulla-Sutherland Sharks, Gold Coast Titans, Penrith Panthers and Wests Tigers)
- Grace Pitts – (Singer and a songwriter who was a contestant on The Voice Australia)

== See also ==
- List of government schools in New South Wales
- Lists of schools in New South Wales
- Lists of schools in Australia
- Education in Australia
