= Western Australian Women's Rugby League =

Female rugby league in Australia

The Western Australian Women's Rugby League is the governing body of female rugby league in Western Australia. It is a member of the Australian Women's Rugby League and Western Australian Rugby League. The organisation is responsible for administering the Western Australia Women's rugby league team.

== See also ==
- Rugby league in Western Australia
- New South Wales Women's Rugby League
- Queensland Women's Rugby League
