= NSW Challenge Cup =

- Current season or competition: 2020 New South Wales Rugby League
- Sport: Rugby league
- Instituted: 2017
- Inaugural season: 2017
- Number of teams: 16
- Region: Australia
- Premiers: Glebe Dirty Reds (2020)
- Website: NSW Challenge Cup
- Related competition: Amco Cup

The NSW Challenge Cup is a rugby league football competition played in Sydney, New South Wales. The competition is administered by the New South Wales Rugby League.

== NSW Challenge Cup Premiers ==
Year	Premiers	Score	Runner-up	Reference
2017	Macquarie Scorpions	30 – 16	Glebe-Burwood Wolves	
2018	Dubbo CYMS	62 – 18	Guildford Owls	
2019	Guildford Owls	42 – 16	Dubbo CYMS	
2020	Glebe Dirty Reds	53 – 16	Wentworthville Magpies	

== Premiership Tally ==
No.	Club	Seasons
1	Glebe Dirty Reds	1 (2020)
1	Guildford Owls	1 (2019)
1	Dubbo CYMS	1 (2018)
1	Macquarie Scorpions	1 (2017)

== See also ==
- Canterbury Cup NSW
- Ron Massey Cup
- Sydney Shield
- President Cup
- Rugby League Competitions in Australia
