= 2022 Western Premier League season =

WPL
- Season: 2022
- Champions: Orange Waratahs (5th title)
- Premiers: Orange Waratahs
- Matches played: 116
- Goals scored: 479 (4.13 per match)
- Top goalscorer: Craig Sugden; Agieg Aluk (16 goals each)

The 2022 Western Premier League, also called the Burmac Western Premier League for sponsorship reasons, was the 22nd season of the Western Premier League (WPL), the top football league in the Central West region of New South Wales. It was the third consecutive year that the competition has run, following an eight-year hiatus. No title was awarded in 2021, following the abandonment of the competition one round before finals due to the COVID-19 pandemic.

The season saw the expansion of the competition to 11 teams with the addition of Bathurst 75 and Orange CYMS, who last competed in the 2008 and 2002 WPL season respectively. CYMS, who finished runners-up in three grand finals in 1997, 1999 and 2000, singled its intention to join the competition back in July, 2021. Bathurst 75 announced its intention to field a team for the 2022 season back in November, 2021. They are also the most successful team in WPL history with six titles.

The season kicked-off with the first round of games on 2–3 April, with a six-team finals series commencing on 3 September. Orange Waratahs were crowned champions, defeating Bathurst club Panorama 2–1 in the grand final. Waratahs striker Craig Sugden and Bathurst 75 forward Agieg Aluk shared the leading goal scorer trophy, finishing the regular season with 16 goals each, while Bathurst 75 midfielder Luke Mutton was named the season's best and fairest.

== Teams ==
=== Home venues and locations ===
Locations of the 2022 WPL clubs.

Club	Location	Ground	Founded	Champions	Champions years
Barnstoneworth United	Orange	Sir Jack Brabham Park	1998	0	
Bathurst 75	Bathurst	Proctor Park	1975	6	1996, 1997, 1998, 2002, 2003, 2005
Dubbo Bulls	Dubbo	Hans Claven Oval; Victoria Park; Apex Oval	2005	4	2010, 2011, 2012, 2020
Lithgow Workmen's	Lithgow	Marjorie Jackson Oval	1982	0	
Macquarie United (Dubbo)	Dubbo	Hans Claven Oval; Victoria Park; Apex Oval	2013	0	
Mudgee Wolves	Mudgee	Glen Willow Regional Sports Stadium		0	
Orana Spurs	Dubbo	Hans Claven Oval; Victoria Park; Apex Oval	1992	1	2001
Orange CYMS	Orange	Sir Jack Brabham Park	1975	0	
Orange Waratahs	Orange	Waratah Sports Ground	1967	4	1995, 2000, 2006, 2007
Panorama	Bathurst	Proctor Park	2012	0	
Parkes Cobras	Parkes	Woodward Oval; Harrison Park	2020	0	

=== Personal and kits ===
Team	Head coach	Captain	Kit manufacturer	Kit sponsor
Barnstoneworth United	Josh Ward	Duncan Logan	KonQa	Little's Power
Bathurst 75	Mark Comerford	Luke Mutton	Paladin Sports	Panthers Bathurst Leagues Club
Dubbo Bulls	Scott Fox	Kobe Rapley		Suzuki Lindsay Mumford
Lithgow Workmen's	Martin Hunter	Logan Inwood	Kookaburra	East
Macquarie United	Rhys Osborne	Brad Matiuscenko	Puma	Castlereagh Hotel
Mudgee Wolves	Harry Hall	Harrison Maynard; Angus Haack	Gioca	Kelly's Irish Pub
Orana Spurs	Ben Mason	Jared Corby		South Dubbo Tavern
Orange CYMS	Matt Roberts	Joe Kay	KonQa	Western Safety Barriers
Orange Waratahs	Adam Scimone	Niall Gibb		Country Fruit Distributors
Panorama	Ricky Guihot	Brent Osborne	Armaduro	Agile Arbor Tree Services
Parkes Cobras	Meaghan Kempson	Brent Tucker	Goosey Sports	Coachman Hotel

== Regular season ==
=== Ladder ===
Pos	Team	Pld	W	D	L	GF	GA	GD	Pts	
1	Orange Waratahs (C)	20	14	2	4	65	21	+44	44	Premiers and Finals series
2	Panorama	20	13	2	5	47	25	+22	41	Finals series
3	Bathurst 75	20	11	6	3	55	33	+22	39	Finals series
4	Barnstoneworth United	20	10	7	3	47	24	+23	37	Finals series
5	Dubbo Bulls	20	11	3	6	58	38	+20	36	Finals series
6	Parkes Cobras	20	10	4	6	55	46	+9	34	Finals series
7	Orana Spurs	20	9	5	6	40	38	+2	32	
8	Mudgee Wolves	20	5	4	11	28	45	−17	19	Withdrew at end of season
9	Lithgow Workmen's	20	4	2	14	29	51	−22	14	Withdrew at end of season
10	Orange CYMS	20	2	4	14	16	66	−50	10	Withdrew at end of season
11	Macquarie United	20	1	1	18	19	72	−53	4	

Updated to match(es) played on 27 August 2022. Source: Dribl
Rules for classification: 1) points; 2) goal difference; 3) number of goals scored.
(C) Champions

=== Results ===
Home \ Away	BU	75	DB	LW	MQ	MW	OS	OC	OW	PA	PC
Barnstoneworth United	—	1–1	2–2	5–0	6–1	2–0	3–0	3–1	2–0	1–1	3–3
Bathurst 75	0–1	—	2–2	1–0	5–1	2–2	2–2	8–1	3–3	2–0	2–0
Dubbo Bulls	0–1	2–3	—	2–1	8–1	5–3	2–4	2–0	1–2	1–2	3–2
Lithgow Workmen's	2–1	3–5	2–6	—	0–1	2–3	1–1	2–2	0–4	1–2	0–2
Macquarie United	2–4	3–4	0–5	2–6	—	0–3 (Note: Macquarie United forfeited. Result awarded to Mudgee Wolves.)	0–3	0–2	0–2	0–2	1–3
Mudgee Wolves	2–2	1–2	3–5	0–1	2–1	—	2–2	0–0	0–2	2–1	3–1
Orana Spurs	2–2	3–2	0–5	3–0 (Note: Lithgow Workmen's forfeited. Result awarded to Orana Spurs.)	2–1	4–0	—	0–0	0–3	0–3	1–4
Orange CYMS	0–8	1–5	0–3	0–5	1–1	1–0	1–2	—	1–6	0–4	2–6
Orange Waratahs	5–0	3–0	7–0	3–0 (Note: Lithgow Workmen's forfeited. Result awarded to Orange Waratahs.)	8–1	3–0 (Note: Mudgee Wolves forfeited. Result awarded to Orange Waratahs.)	2–3	6–1	—	2–1	2–2
Panorama	2–0	2–2	0–1	3–1	2–1	6–1	4–3	2–0	2–0	—	5–1
Parkes Cobras	0–0	2–4	3–3	5–2	4–2	3–1	1–5	3–2	4–2	6–3	—

Updated to match(es) played on 27 August 2022. Source: Dribl
Legend: Blue = home team win; Yellow = draw; Red = away team win.

== Finals series ==
Elimination finals
3	Bathurst 75	1 (2)
6	Parkes Cobras (pen.)	1 (4)
4	Barnstoneworth United	1
5	Dubbo Bulls	0

Semifinals
1	Orange Waratahs	3
2	Panorama	2
Barnstoneworth United	2 (3)
Parkes Cobras (pen.)	2 (5)

Preliminary final
Panorama	3
Parkes Cobras	2

Grand final
Orange Waratahs	2
Panorama	1

=== Qualifying finals ===
3 September 2022	Bathurst 75	1–1 (a.e.t.) (2–4 p)	Parkes Cobras	Bathurst
15:00	James Christie 95'	Report	Cameron Kopp 107'	Stadium: Proctor Park
	Penalties
	Thomas Rooke (penalty scored); Damien Booth (penalty scored); Agieg Aluk (penalty missed); James Christie (penalty missed)		Mitch Hutchings (penalty scored); Alec Bateson (penalty scored); Brent Morgan (penalty scored); Lachlan Hando (penalty scored)

3 September 2022	Barnstoneworth United	1–0	Dubbo Bulls	Orange
15:00	Kenny McCall 60'	Report		Stadium: Sir Jack Brabham Park

=== Semi finals ===
10 September 2022	Barnstoneworth United	2–2 (a.e.t.) (3–5 p)	Parkes Cobras	Orange
15:00	Jarvis Marat 40'; Kenny McCall 76'	Report	Mitch Hutchings 22'; Ben Coultas 33'	Stadium: Sir Jack Brabham Park
	Penalties
	Kenny McCall (penalty missed); Jarvis Marat (penalty scored); Duncan Logan (penalty scored); Dylan Halls (penalty scored)		Mitch Hutchings (penalty scored); Alec Bateson (penalty scored); Brent Morgan (penalty scored); Lachlan Hando (penalty scored); Cameron Kopp (penalty scored)

11 September 2022	Orange Waratahs	3–2	Panorama	Orange
13:00	Craig Sugden 9'; Jarrod Portegies 33' (o.g.); Bastien Fougerolle 90+5'	Report	Jaiden Culbert 35'; Steven Long 82'	Stadium: Waratahs Sports Ground

=== Preliminary final ===
17 September 2022	Panorama	3–2 (a.e.t.)	Parkes Cobras	Bathurst
16:00	Jaiden Culbert 1'; Ryan Campbell 40'; Jarrod Portegies 116' (pen.)	Report	Alec Bateson 53' (pen.); Brad Campbell 76' (o.g.)	Stadium: Proctor Park

=== Grand final ===
24 September 2022	Orange Waratahs	2–1	Panorama	Orange
15:00		Report		Stadium: Waratahs Sports Ground; Referee: David Hemsworth (Dubbo)

== Season statistics ==
=== Top goal scorers ===
As of 27 August 2022. Includes regular season only.

Rank	Player	Club	Goals
1	Craig Sugden	Orange Waratahs	16
1	Agieg Aluk	Bathurst 75	16
3	Mitch Hutchings	Parkes Cobras	14
3	Gareth Williams	Dubbo Bulls	14
5	Thomas Rooke	Bathurst 75	12
6	Alex Richardson-Bell	Dubbo Bulls	11
6	Alec Bateson	Parkes Cobras	11
8	Jaiden Culbert	Panorama	10
8	Dylan Halls	Barnstoneworth United	10
8	Adam Scimone	Orange Waratahs	10
8	Lachlan Hando	Parkes Cobras	10

=== Hat-tricks ===
Player	For	Against	Result	Date
Lachlan Peet	Orange Waratahs	Barnstoneworth United	5–0 (H)	2 April 2022
Gareth Williams	Dubbo Bulls	Macquarie United	5–0 (A)	22 April 2022
Adam Scimone	Orange Waratahs	Orange CYMS	6–1 (A)	8 May 2022
Gareth Williams	Dubbo Bulls	Orana Spurs	5–0 (A)	20 May 2022
Craig Sugden	Orange Waratahs	Dubbo Bulls	7–0 (H)	28 May 2022
Guy Burgess^{4}	Orange Waratahs	Dubbo Bulls	7–0 (H)	28 May 2022
Jaiden Culbert	Panorama	Parkes Cobras	5–1 (H)	11 June 2022
Agieg Aluk^{4}	Bathurst 75	Orange CYMS	8–1 (H)	25 June 2022
Craig Sugden	Orange Waratahs	Macquarie United	8–1 (H)	9 July 2022
Adam Scimone	Orange Waratahs	Macquarie United	8–1 (H)	9 July 2022
Josh Hurt	Mudgee Wolves	Parkes Cobras	3–1 (H)	16 July 2022
Mitch Hutchings	Parkes Cobras	Panorama	6–3 (H)	21 July 2022
Craig Sugden	Orange Waratahs	Orange CYMS	6–1 (H)	23 July 2022
Brad Luka	Lithgow Workmen's	Macquarie United	6–2 (A)	23 July 2022
Luke Mutton	Bathurst 75	Lithgow Workmen's	5–3 (A)	30 July 2022
Dylan Halls	Barnstoneworth United	Orange CYMS	8–0 (A)	6 August 2022
Tim Dowler	Barnstoneworth United	Orange CYMS	8–0 (A)	6 August 2022
Jaiden Culbert	Panorama	Orange CYMS	4–0 (A)	17 August 2022
Gareth Williams	Dubbo Bulls	Lithgow Workmen's	6–2 (A)	20 August 2022
Lachlan Hando	Parkes Cobras	Orange CYMS	6–2 (A)	21 August 2022

Key
^{4}	Player scored four goals
