= Presidents Cup (rugby league) =

Annual rugby competition in New South Wales

- Current season or competition: 2023 NSWRL Presidents Cup
- Sport: Rugby league
- Instituted: 1910
- Inaugural season: 1910
- Number of teams: 9
- Country: Australia
- Premiers: Maitland Pumpkin Pickers (2022)
- Most titles: South Sydney Rabbitohs (20 titles)
- Website: President Cup
- Related competition: Conferences: Illawarra Rugby League; Newcastle Rugby League; Peter McDonald Premiership; Ron Massey Cup; Related: Sydney Shield; NSW Challenge Cup; Canterbury Cup

The NSWRL President's Cup is a semi-professional, open-aged rugby league football competition played in New South Wales. The competition is administered by the New South Wales Rugby League (NSWRL). The competition includes teams from domestic rugby league clubs (mainly from the Illawarra District), Ron Massey Cup, Sydney Shield and Canterbury Cup clubs.

== History ==
The President's Cup is a rugby league trophy which has been awarded in many competitions, governed by New South Wales Rugby League (NSWRL). It was 1910 when Sir James Joynton Smith, the newly appointed President of the NSWRL, donated the trophy. Joynton Smith was the Lord Mayor of Sydney and earned a knighthood for his philanthropic work. A shrewd businessman, he was a key figure in the game up until his death in 1943.

Initially the President's Cup was awarded in the Under 21 competition between representative teams from each district's junior league. It ran in this format until the mid-1990s.

As the top tier premiership expanded in the 1980s, and the Under 23s competition was scrapped, the Under 21s competition was expanded. In 1997, with a split competition, the ARL scrapped reserve grade, and the Under 21s served as curtain raisers to first grade games. The following year, the first year of the NRL, the Under 21s competition was scrapped, junior competitions were rationalised, and reserve grade was reintroduced under different names, including Premier League and First Division. The President's Cup trophy was awarded to the winner of this competition. In 2008, the centenary of rugby league in Australia, this division was renamed as the NSW Cup competition. The President's Cup trophy was awarded for the first two years in this grade, then a new trophy was awarded for the 2010 competition.

=== Historic President's Cup competitions ===
President's Cup 1910–1996 (Third Grade 1910–1972, 1982–1984; Under-23s 1973–1981, 1985–1987; Under-21s 1988–1996) (Awarded President's Cup)
Year	Premiers	Score	Runners-up
1910	Eastern Suburbs Roosters		
1911	Eastern Suburbs Roosters		
1912	Balmain Tigers		
1913	Eastern Suburbs Roosters		
1914	Balmain Tigers		
1915	Eastern Suburbs Roosters		
1916	Not held		
1917	Not held		
1918	North Sydney Bears		
1919	Newtown Jets		
1920	Eastern Suburbs Roosters		
1921	Newtown Jets		
1922	Eastern Suburbs Roosters		
1923	Eastern Suburbs Roosters		
1924	Eastern Suburbs Roosters		
1925	Western Suburbs Magpies		
1926	Balmain Tigers		
1927	Eastern Suburbs Roosters		
1928	Newtown Jets		
1929	Balmain Tigers		
1930	Balmain Tigers		
1931	Canterbury-Bankstown Bulldogs		
1932	Balmain Tigers		
1933	North Sydney Bears		
1934	Southern Districts		
1935	St. George Dragons		
1936	South Sydney Rabbitohs		
1937	North Sydney Bears		
1938	Eastern Suburbs Roosters		
1939	Balmain Tigers		
1940	Balmain Tigers		
1941	St. George Dragons		
1942	South Sydney Rabbitohs		
1943	South Sydney Rabbitohs		
1944	Newtown Jets		
1945	Western Suburbs Magpies		
1946	Manly Warringah Sea Eagles		
1947	Western Suburbs Magpies		
1948	Eastern Suburbs Roosters		
1949	Eastern Suburbs Roosters		
1950	Newtown Jets		
1951	South Sydney Rabbitohs		
1952	Balmain Tigers		
1953	South Sydney Rabbitohs		
1954	Balmain Tigers		
1955	Eastern Suburbs Roosters		
1956	Newtown Jets		
1957	St. George Dragons		
1958	Western Suburbs Magpies		
1959	Balmain Tigers		
1960	South Sydney Rabbitohs		
1961	South Sydney Rabbitohs		
1962	South Sydney Rabbitohs		
1963	South Sydney Rabbitohs		
1964	South Sydney Rabbitohs		
1965	South Sydney Rabbitohs		
1966	Balmain Tigers		
1967	Balmain Tigers		
1968	South Sydney Rabbitohs		
1969	South Sydney Rabbitohs		
1970	Manly Warringah Sea Eagles		
1971	South Sydney Rabbitohs		
1972	South Sydney Rabbitohs		
1973	Balmain Tigers		
1974	South Sydney Rabbitohs		
1975	Parramatta Eels		
1976	Canterbury-Bankstown Bulldogs		
1977	South Sydney Rabbitohs		
1978	Eastern Suburbs Roosters		
1979	Parramatta Eels		
1980	South Sydney Rabbitohs		
1981	St George Dragons		
1982	South Sydney Rabbitohs		
1983	South Sydney Rabbitohs		
1984	Illawarra Steelers		
1985	St George Dragons	24–20	Parramatta Eels
1986	South Sydney Rabbitohs	13–0	Penrith Panthers
1987	St George Dragons	32–14	South Sydney Rabbitohs
1988	Parramatta Eels	28–14	Eastern Suburbs Roosters
1989	South Sydney Rabbitohs	26–4	Canberra Raiders
1990	Canberra Raiders	13–6	St George Dragons
1991	Canterbury-Bankstown Bulldogs	22–14	Parramatta Eels
1992	Western Suburbs Magpies		St George Dragons
1993	Eastern Suburbs Roosters	17–4	Cronulla-Sutherland Sharks
1994	Cronulla-Sutherland Sharks		Eastern Suburbs Roosters
1995	Newcastle Knights		Cronulla-Sutherland Sharks
1996	South Queensland Crushers	24–12	Parramatta Eels

Reserve Grade/First Division/Premier League/NSW Cup Premiers 1997–2010 (Awarded President's Cup)
Year	Premiers	Score	Runners-up
1997^{1}	Parramatta Eels	26–16	Balmain Tigers
1998	Canterbury-Bankstown Bulldogs	26–22	Parramatta Eels
1999	Parramatta Eels	44–4	Balmain Tigers
2000	Canterbury-Bankstown Bulldogs	30–26	Penrith Panthers
2001	St. George Illawarra Dragons	34–10	Parramatta Eels
2002	Canterbury-Bankstown Bulldogs	24–22	St. George Illawarra Dragons
2003	Canberra Raiders	31–6	St Marys-Penrith Saints
2004	Sydney Roosters	30–8	St. George Illawarra Dragons
2005	Parramatta Eels	31–12	Sydney Roosters
2006	Parramatta Eels	20–19	Newtown Jets
2007	Parramatta Eels	20–15	North Sydney Bears
2008	Wentworthville Magpies	12–8	Newtown Jets
2009	Bankstown City Bulls	32–0	Balmain Ryde-Eastwood Tigers
2010	Canterbury-Bankstown Bulldogs	24–12	Windsor Wolves

== Modern President's Cup ==
After the Metropolitan Cup/Bundaberg Rum Cup/Jim Beam Cup/Ron Massey Cup took over the mantle of the Third Grade Championship. This was until, after the NSWRL-CRL merger in 2020, the champions of the Illawarra Rugby League and Newcastle Rugby League began to playoff against the Ron Massey Cup champions for the prestigious President's Cup. The Peter McDonald Premiership became the fourth feeder league to this Champions League-style tournament in 2022 following the Group 10–Group 11 merger.

=== 2020 format ===
In 2020, the competition returned in light of NSWRL competitions being cancelled due to the COVID-19 crisis. These cancelled competitions include the NSW Cup, Ron Massey Cup and the Newcastle Rugby League competition. Nine teams competed in the returning edition; North Sydney Bears, Dubbo CYMS, Thirroul Butchers, Western Suburbs Red Devils, Western Rams, Hills District Bulls, Wentworthville Magpies, Maitland Pumpkin Pickers and Glebe-Burwood Wolves. The competition was played over nine rounds with two weeks of finals including the Grand Final on 27-Sep at Bankwest Stadium, Parramatta. Maitland Pickers won the Grand Final 17–16 over Glebe-Burwood Wolves, capturing the Premiership as well as the minor premiership for topping the regular season ladder. Hooker Alex Langbridge was named both the player of the Grand Final and of the season as a whole.

=== 2021–present: Statewide third grade ===
From 2021, the competition will be the statewide third grade competition, running as an end of season competition for the premiers of Illawarra Rugby League, Newcastle Rugby League, Peter McDonald Premiership and Ron Massey Cup. The Peter McDonald Premiership joined the other three leagues as third-tier competitions through the merger of the fourth tier Group 10 and Group 11 competitions. After 2021 saw the competition cancelled due to COVID, 2022 saw a return to the competition, with Maitland Pickers defending their 2020 title. On 25 September 2022, they defeated The Hills Bulls 36–12. Maitland Pickers Five-Eighth Chad O'Donnell was named player of the match.

== Modern President's Cup champions ==
Year	Champions	Score	Runners-up	Match information
Year	Champions	Score	Runners-up	Date	Venue	Referee
NSWRL Presidents Cup (2020–23)
2020	Maitland Pickers	17 – 16	Glebe-Burwood Wolves	27 September 2020	Bankwest Stadium, Sydney	K. Irons
2021	Cancelled Due to Covid-19
2022	(2) Maitland Pickers	36 – 12	Hills District Bulls	25 September 2022	CommBank Stadium, Sydney	C. Paddy
2023	(3) Maitland Pickers	32 – 10	St Marys Saints	24 September 2023	CommBank Stadium, Sydney	D. Brady

Team	Winners	Runners-up	Years won	Years runner-up
Maitland Pickers	3	0	2020, 2022, 2023	–
Glebe-Burwood Wolves	0	1	–	2020
Hills District Bulls	0	1	–	2022
St Marys Saints	0	1	–	2023

== Conference winners ==
=== Central Conference ===
Year	Premiers	Score	Runners-up	Match Information
Year	Premiers	Score	Runners-up	Date	Venue	Referee
NSWRL President's Cup (2020)
2020	Maitland Pickers	17 – 16	Glebe-Burwood Wolves	27 September 2020	Bankwest Stadium, Sydney	K. Irons
Ron Massey Cup (2021–present)
2021	Cancelled Due to Covid-19
2022	Hills District Bulls	18 – 12	Glebe Dirty Reds	4 September 2022	Netstrata Jubilee Stadium, Sydney	D. Brady
2023	St Marys Saints	40 – 12	Wentworthville Magpies	3 September 2023	Netstrata Jubilee Stadium, Sydney	C. Wills

Team	Winners	Runners-up	Years won	Years runner-up
Maitland Pickers	1	0	2020	–
Hills District Bulls	1	0	2022	–
St Marys Saints	1	0	2023	–
Glebe-Burwood Wolves	0	1	–	2020
Glebe Dirty Reds	0	1	–	2022
Wentworthville Magpies	0	1	–	2023

=== Northern Conference ===
Year	Premiers	Score	Runners-up	Match Information
Year	Premiers	Score	Runners-up	Date	Venue	Referee
Denton Engineering Cup (2021–present)
2021	Cancelled Due to Covid-19
2022	Maitland Pickers	40 – 4	Macquarie Scorpions	11 September 2022	McDonald Jones Stadium, Newcastle	J. Butler
2023	(2) Maitland Pickers	46 – 10	South Newcastle Lions	3 September 2023	McDonald Jones Stadium, Newcastle	J. Butler

Team	Winners	Runners-up	Years won	Years runner-up
Maitland Pickers	2	0	2022, 2023	–
Macquarie Scorpions	0	1	–	2022
South Newcastle Lions	0	1	–	2023

=== Southern Conference ===
Year	Premiers	Score	Runners-up	Match Information
Year	Premiers	Score	Runners-up	Date	Venue	Referee
Mojo Homes Illawarra Cup (2021–present)
2021	Cancelled Due to Covid-19
2022	Collegians Collie Dogs	12 – 10	Western Suburbs Red Devils	4 September 2022	WIN Stadium, Wollongong	R. Jackson
2023	Thirroul Butchers	24 – 18	Collegians Collie Dogs	2 September 2023	WIN Stadium, Wollongong	L. Greenfield

Team	Winners	Runners-up	Years won	Years runner-up
Collegians Collie Dogs	1	1	2022	2023
Thirroul Butchers	1	0	2023	–
Western Suburbs Red Devils	0	1	–	2022

=== Western Conference ===
Year	Premiers	Score	Runners-up	Match information
Year	Premiers	Score	Runners-up	Date	Venue	Referee
Peter McDonald Premiership (2022–present)
2022	Forbes Magpies	28 – 16	Dubbo CYMS	4 September 2022	Apex Oval, Dubbo	B. Greatbatch
2023	Dubbo CYMS	25 – 12	Mudgee Dragons	10 September 2023	Apex Oval, Dubbo	A. Pond

Team	Winners	Runners-up	Years won	Years runner-up
Dubbo CYMS	1	1	2023	2022
Forbes Magpies	1	0	2022	–
Mudgee Dragons	0	1	–	2023

== See also ==
- NSW Cup
- Ron Massey Cup
- Sydney Shield
- NSW Challenge Cup
- List of rugby league competitions in Australia
