= Jersey Flegg Cup =

Junior rugby league competition

- Current season, competition or edition: 2026 NSWRL Major Competitions
- Sport: Rugby league
- First season: 1961
- Owner: NSWRL
- CEO: David Trodden
- No. of teams: 14
- Countries: Australia, New Zealand, Fiji
- Most recent champion: Melbourne Storm (2025)
- Most titles: Canterbury-Bankstown Bulldogs (11 titles)
- Related competitions: NRL Under-20s; Hastings Deering Colts
- Website: Jersey Flegg

The Jersey Flegg Cup is a junior rugby league competition played in New South Wales, Australia, contested among teams made up of players aged 21 or under. The competition is administered by the New South Wales Rugby League (NSWRL), and is named after Eastern Suburbs foundation player and prominent administrator of the game, Harry "Jersey" Flegg.

== History ==
The Jersey Flegg Cup began in 1961 as an under-19 age group competition and was originally played over 9–12 weeks early in the season, alongside the S. G. Ball Cup and Harold Matthews Cup during the NSWRL's junior representative season. In 1998, with the advent of the National Rugby League (NRL), the competition switched to an under-20 age limit and was played over a full season, running alongside the senior NRL competition and culminating with the Grand Final held on the same day as the NRL Grand Final.

The competition ceased at the end of the 2007 season to make way for the NRL-administered under-20 competition, the National Youth Competition (NYC), which commenced in 2008.

In 2016, the NRL announced that the National Youth Competition would be discontinued after the 2017 season, in favour of state-based under-20 competitions, administered by the Queensland Rugby League (QRL) and New South Wales Rugby League (NSWRL).

On 1 February 2018, the NSWRL officially announced the reintroduction of the Jersey Flegg Cup for the 2018 season after a 10-year absence.

== Jersey Flegg Cup teams ==
The Jersey Flegg Cup consists of 14 teams, 10 from New South Wales, one each from Auckland, Australian Capital Territory, Victoria and Fiji. In 2019, the Canberra Raiders and South Sydney Rabbitohs returned to the competition after using their New South Wales Cup affiliates in 2018, while the Victoria Thunderbolts joined after spending the last four seasons in QRL-based competitions.

Most of the clubs being colts grade teams to the reserve grade teams of the New South Wales Cup and the senior grade teams of the NRL.

=== Current teams ===
Jersey Flegg Cup
Club	City/Town	State/Territory	Home Venue/s	Est.	Title/s	Recent	NRL affiliate
Canberra Raiders	Canberra	Australian Capital Territory	GIO Stadium (Note: Alternate Home Venue/s for Canberra: Raiders Belconnen)	1982	2	1993	Raiders
Canterbury-Bankstown Bulldogs	Belmore	New South Wales	Belmore Sports Ground (Note: Alternate Home Venue/s for Canterbury: Hammonville Oval)	1934	11	2024	Bulldogs
Cronulla-Sutherland Sharks	Woolooware	New South Wales	Sharks Stadium (Note: Alternate Home Venue/s for Cronulla: Henson Park)	1967	1	2018	Sharks
Kaiviti Silktails	Lautoka	Ba Province	Churchill Park (Note: Alternate Home Venue/s for Kaiviti: Prince Charles Park, Nadi)	2020 (Note: Club has competed in Jersey Flegg Cup since 2024 season)	0	—	None
Manly-Warringah Sea Eagles	Brookvale	New South Wales	Brookvale Oval	1947	3	1987	Sea Eagles
Melbourne Storm	Melbourne	Victoria	AAMI Park (Note: Alternate Home Venue/s for Melbourne: Seabrook Reserve)	1998 (Note: Club has competed in Jersey Flegg Cup since 2019 season)	1	2025	Storm
Newcastle Knights	Newcastle	New South Wales	McDonald Jones Stadium (Note: Alternate Home Venue/s for Newcastle: Newcastle Knights Centre of Excellence)	1988	2	1992	Knights
New Zealand Warriors	Auckland	Auckland	Go Media Stadium (Note: Alternate Home Venue/s for Warriors: Navigation Homes Stadium, North Harbour Stadium, The Trusts Arena)	1995 (Note: Club has returned to the Jersey Flegg Cup from the 2024 season)	0	—	Warriors
Parramatta Eels	Wentworthville	New South Wales	New Era Stadium (Note: Alternate Home Venue/s for Parramatta: Kellyville Park)	1947	3	1990	Eels
Penrith Panthers	Penrith	New South Wales	Parker Street Reserve (Note: Alternate Home Venue/s for Penrith: Windsor Sports Complex)	1967	5	2022	Panthers
South Sydney Rabbitohs	Redfern	New South Wales	Redfern Oval (Note: Alternate Home Venue/s for South Sydney: Accor Stadium)	1908	9	2019	Rabbitohs
St George Illawarra Dragons	Sydney, Wollongong	New South Wales	Collegians Sporting Complex (Note: Alternate Home Venue/s for St. George Illawarra: WIN Stadium)	1998 (Note: Club was formed as a joint-venture of former existing clubs.)	1 (Note: Previous clubs making up the joint venture had won premierships prior to merging, which are not included in this tally)	2005	Dragons
Sydney Roosters	Sydney	New South Wales	Wentworth Park (Note: Alternate Home Venue/s for Sydney: NSWRL Centre of Excellence)	1908	3	2004	Roosters
Wests Tigers	Campbelltown	New South Wales	Campbelltown Stadium (Note: Alternate Home Venue/s for Wests Tigers: Lidcombe Oval)	1999	0	—	Tigers

== Season structure ==
=== Regular season ===
The Jersey Flegg Cup follows a similar regular season format to the NSW Cup, with games often played as curtain-raisers to the senior fixtures. Beginning in early March, a round of regular season games is then played almost every weekend for 26 weeks, ending in late August. Unlike the NSW Cup, the Jersey Flegg Cup features three full rounds where every team receives a bye. These rounds are scheduled in to accommodate university exam periods.

Teams receive two competition points for a win, and one point for a draw. The bye also receives two points; a loss, no points. Teams on the ladder are ranked by competition points, then match points differential (for and against) and points percentage are used to separate teams with equal competition points. At the end of the regular season, the club which is ranked highest on the ladder is declared minor premiers.

=== Finals series ===
The eight highest placed teams at the end of the regular season compete in the finals series. The Jersey Flegg follows the same finals format as the NRL and the NSW Cup. The system consists of a number of games between the top eight teams over four weeks in September, until only two teams remain.

These two teams then contest the Grand Final, which is played in late September at a suburban Sydney stadium (for example, Leichhardt Oval), as a curtain-raiser to the NSW Cup Grand Final.

== Premiership winners ==
Year	Age	Premiers	Score	Runner-up	Minor Premiers	Wooden Spooners	Reference
1961	U17	Manly Sea Eagles	23–5	Wests Magpies	Knock Out Competition		
1962	U17	Souths Rabbitohs	14–9	Parramatta Eels	Knock Out Competition		
1963	U17	Canterbury Bulldogs	10–0	Newtown Jets	Knock Out Competition		
1964	U17	Souths Rabbitohs	10–4	St George Dragons	Knock Out Competition		
1965	U17	Wests Magpies	12–4	Balmain Tigers	Knock Out Competition		
1966	U17	Souths Rabbitohs	10–4	Balmain Tigers	Balmain Tigers	Norths Bears	
1967	U17	Souths Rabbitohs	8–2	St George Dragons	St George Dragons	Norths Bears	
1968	U17	Souths Rabbitohs	13–7	Parramatta Eels	St George Dragons	Norths Bears	
1969	U18	Souths Rabbitohs	6–0	Canterbury Bulldogs	Souths Rabbitohs	Norths Bears	
1970	U18	Parramatta Eels	7–6	Souths Rabbitohs	Souths Rabbitohs	Easts Roosters	
1971	U18	Canterbury Bulldogs	11–8	Souths Rabbitohs	Canterbury Bulldogs	Norths Bears	
1972	U18	Souths Rabbitohs	15–5	Wests Magpies	Souths Rabbitohs	Norths Bears	
1973	U18	Balmain Tigers	10–7	Penrith Panthers	Parramatta Eels	Canterbury Bulldogs	
1974	U18	Manly Sea Eagles	8–7	Parramatta Eels			
1975	U18	St George Dragons	14–10	Wests Magpies			
1976	U17	Canterbury Bulldogs	18–10	Parramatta Eels			
1977	U17	Penrith Panthers	15-3	Parramatta Eels			
1978	U18	Souths Rabbitohs	12–10	Balmain Tigers	12 teams split into 2 zones of 6 teams. Semi-Finals were Zone 1 1st-place vs Zone 2 2nd-place, and Zone 2 1st-place vs Zone 1 2nd-place.		
1979	U18	Canterbury Bulldogs	22–12	Souths Rabbitohs	12 teams split into 2 zones of 6 teams. Semi-Finals were Zone 1 1st-place vs Zone 2 2nd-place, and Zone 2 1st-place vs Zone 1 2nd-place.		
1980	U18	Balmain Tigers	26–7	Newtown Jets	12 teams split into 2 zones of 6 teams. Semi-Finals were Zone 1 1st-place vs Zone 2 2nd-place, and Zone 2 1st-place vs Zone 1 2nd-place.		
1981	U18	Wests Magpies	12–7	Souths Rabbitohs	12 teams split into 2 zones of 6 teams. Semi-Finals were Zone 1 1st-place vs Zone 2 2nd-place, and Zone 2 1st-place vs Zone 1 2nd-place.		
1982	U18	Balmain Tigers	12–10	Cronulla Sharks	Wests Magpies	Easts Roosters	
1983	U18	Canterbury Bulldogs	26–6	Balmain Tigers	Balmain Tigers	Newtown Jets	
1984	U18	Balmain Tigers	10–0	Penrith Panthers	Balmain Tigers	Easts Roosters	
1985	U19	Parramatta Eels	10–7	Manly Sea Eagles	Balmain Tigers	Newtown-Campbelltown Jets	
1986	U19	Penrith Panthers	48–6	Illawarra Steelers	Penrith Panthers	St George Dragons	
1987	U19	Manly Sea Eagles	20–0	Balmain Tigers	Souths Rabbitohs	Wests Magpies (White)	
1988	U19	Balmain Tigers	19–10	Newcastle Knights			
1989	U19	Canberra Raiders	26–8	Balmain Tigers	Canberra Raiders	St George Dragons	
1990	U19	Parramatta Eels	22–8	Cronulla Sharks	Parramatta Eels	St George Dragons	
1991	U19	Newcastle Knights	28–12	Canberra Raiders	Newcastle Knights	Easts Roosters	
1992	U19	Newcastle Knights	26–12	Wests Magpies	Newcastle Knights	Canterbury Bulldogs	
1993	U19	Canberra Raiders	28–6	St George Dragons	Canberra Raiders		
1994	U19	Balmain Tigers	34–26	St George Dragons			
1995	U19	Sydney City Roosters	29–16	Manly Sea Eagles			
1996	U19	St George Dragons	22–10	Manly Sea Eagles	St George Dragons	Sydney Tigers	
1997	U20	Balmain Tigers		Sydney City Roosters			
1998	U19	Norths Bears	28–12	Parramatta Eels	Norths Bears	Canberra Raiders	
1999	U20	Canterbury Bulldogs	18–12	Newcastle Knights	St George Dragons	Wests Magpies	
2000	U20	Canterbury Bulldogs	22–8	Wests Magpies	Canterbury Bulldogs	Souths Rabbitohs	
2001	U20	Canterbury Bulldogs	12–10	Cronulla Sharks	Canterbury Bulldogs	Souths Rabbitohs	
2002	U20	Sydney Roosters	23–22	St George Illawarra Dragons	St George Illawarra Dragons	Balmain Tigers	
2003	U19	Canterbury Bulldogs	32–22	Cronulla Sharks	Cronulla Sharks	Central Coast Rip	
2004	U20	Sydney Roosters	14–13	Cronulla Sharks	Sydney Roosters	Central Coast Rip	
2005	U20	St George Illawarra Dragons	30–20	Parramatta Eels	St George Illawarra Dragons	Central Coast	
2006	U20	Penrith Panthers	22–20	Newcastle Knights	Newcastle Knights	Central Coast	
2007	U20	Penrith Panthers	19–14	Parramatta Eels	Penrith Panthers	Central Coast Storm	
2008–2017 competition not held
2018	U20	Cronulla Sharks	22–12	Penrith Panthers	Newcastle Knights	Wests Tigers	
2019	U20	Souths Rabbitohs	16–14	Canberra Raiders	Cronulla Sharks	Manly Sea Eagles	
2020	Season was suspended and then cancelled due to the COVID-19 pandemic.						
2021	U21	Season was suspended and then cancelled due to the COVID-19 pandemic.					
2022	U21	Penrith Panthers	19–18	Newcastle Knights	Sydney Roosters	Souths Rabbitohs	
2023	U21	Canterbury Bulldogs	22–20	Sydney Roosters	Sydney Roosters	Wests Tigers	
2024	U21	Canterbury Bulldogs	14–12	Cronulla Sharks	Canberra Raiders	Kaiviti Silktails	
2025	U21	Melbourne Storm	38–16	Penrith Panthers	Melbourne Storm	Kaiviti Silktails	

== Premiership tally ==
	Team	Total	Seasons
1	Canterbury-Bankstown Bulldogs	11	1963, 1971, 1976, 1979, 1983, 1999, 2000, 2001, 2003, 2023, 2024
2	South Sydney Rabbitohs	9	1962, 1964, 1966, 1967, 1968, 1969, 1972, 1978, 2019
3	Balmain Tigers	8	1973, 1980, 1981, 1982, 1984, 1988, 1994, 1997
4	Penrith Panthers	5	1977, 1986, 2006, 2007, 2022
5	Manly-Warringah Sea Eagles	3	1961, 1974, 1987
5	Parramatta Eels	3	1970, 1985, 1990
5	Sydney Roosters	3	1995, 2002, 2004
8	St George Dragons	2	1975, 1996
8	Canberra Raiders	2	1989, 1993
8	Newcastle Knights	2	1991, 1992
11	Melbourne Storm	1	2025
11	Cronulla-Sutherland Sharks	1	2018
11	St George Illawarra Dragons	1	2005
11	North Sydney Bears	1	1998
11	Western Suburbs Magpies	1	1965

== See also ==
- NRL Under-20s
- Harold Matthews Cup
- S. G. Ball Cup
- Hastings Deering Colts
- Rugby League Competitions in Australia
