= 2015 Ron Massey Cup =

- Teams: 11
- Premiers: Mounties
- Minor premiers: Mounties
- Wooden spoon: Kingsgrove Colts
- Top points scorer: Sam Aiga
- Top try-scorer: Mick Pearsall

The 2015 Ron Massey Cup is the 15th season of the semi-professional development level rugby league competition in New South Wales, Australia, run jointly by the New South Wales Rugby League and the Country Rugby League of New South Wales.

== Clubs ==
In 2015, 11 clubs are fielding teams in the Ron Massey Cup.

- Auburn Warriors
- Asquith Magpies
- Blacktown Workers
- Concord-Burwood Wolves
- Cabramatta Two Blues
- Guildford Owls
- Kingsgrove Colts
- Mounties
- Western Suburbs Magpies
- Windsor Wolves
- Wentworthville Magpies

== Season ==
=== Round 1 ===
Home	Score	Away	Match Information
Home	Score	Away	Date and Time	Venue
Western Suburbs Magpies	22-44	Cabramatta Two Blues	14 March 2015	Kirkham Oval
Kingsgrove Colts	4-68	Asquith Magpies	14 March 2015	Norford Park
Mounties	22-18	Blacktown Workers	14 March 2015	Aubrey Keech Reserve
Guildford Owls	18-38	Wentworthville Magpies	14 March 2015	McCredie Park
Auburn Warriors	50-10	Windsor Wolves	14 March 2015	Lidcombe Oval
Bye: Concord-Burwood Wolves

=== Round 2 ===
Home	Score	Away	Match Information
Home	Score	Away	Date and Time	Venue
Windsor Wolves	28-16	Guildford Owls	22 March 2015	Windsor Sports Complex
Wentworthville Magpies	22-6	Blacktown Workers	22 March 2015	Ringrose Park
Mounties	72-12	Kingsgrove Colts	21 March 2015	Aubrey Keech Reserve
Western Suburbs Magpies	24-14	Concord-Burwood Wolves	21 March 2015	Campbelltown Stadium
Cabramatta Two Blues	32-33	Asquith Magpies	22 March 2015	New Era Stadium
Bye: Auburn Warriors

=== Round 3 ===
Home	Score	Away	Match Information
Home	Score	Away	Date and Time	Venue
Mounties	32-26	Cabramatta Two Blues	28 March 2015	Aubrey Keech Reserve
Blacktown Workers	20-26	Windsor Wolves	28 March 2015	HE Laybutt Sporting Complex
Wentworthville Magpies	52-4	Kingsgrove Colts	29 March 2015	Ringrose Park
Concord-Burwood Wolves	22-30	Asquith Magpies	29 March 2015	Crestwood Oval
Guildford Owls	16-25	Auburn Warriors	29 March 2015	McCredie Park
Bye: Western Suburbs Magpies

=== Round 4 ===
Home	Score	Away	Match Information
Home	Score	Away	Date and Time	Venue
Windsor Wolves	36-10	Kingsgrove Colts	2 April 2015	Windsor Sporting Complex
Western Suburbs Magpies	10-28	Asquith Magpies	4 April 2015	Campbelltown Stadium
Auburn Warriors	12-22	Blacktown Workers	4 April 2015	Lidcombe Oval
Concord-Burwood Wolves	38-16	Mounties	7 June 2015 •	Goddard Park
Wentworthville Magpies	30-18	Cabramatta Two Blues	7 June 2015 •	Ringrose Park
Bye: Guildford Owls

- • Note: The matches between Wolves v Mounties and Wenty v Cabramatta were played later on in the season as a 'washout game' after violent storms cancelled the match early in 2015.

=== Round 5 ===
Home	Score	Away	Match Information
Home	Score	Away	Date and Time	Venue
Bye:

=== Round 6 ===
Home	Score	Away	Match Information
Home	Score	Away	Date and Time	Venue
Bye:

=== Round 7 ===
Home	Score	Away	Match Information
Home	Score	Away	Date and Time	Venue
Bye:

=== Round 8 ===
Home	Score	Away	Match Information
Home	Score	Away	Date and Time	Venue
Bye:

=== Round 9 ===
Home	Score	Away	Match Information
Home	Score	Away	Date and Time	Venue
Bye:

=== Round 10 ===
Home	Score	Away	Match Information
Home	Score	Away	Date and Time	Venue
Bye:

=== Round 11 ===
Home	Score	Away	Match Information
Home	Score	Away	Date and Time	Venue
Bye:

=== Round 12 ===
Home	Score	Away	Match Information
Home	Score	Away	Date and Time	Venue
Bye:

=== Round 13 ===
Home	Score	Away	Match Information
Home	Score	Away	Date and Time	Venue
Bye:

=== Round 14 ===
Home	Score	Away	Match Information
Home	Score	Away	Date and Time	Venue
Bye:

=== Round 15 ===
Home	Score	Away	Match Information
Home	Score	Away	Date and Time	Venue
Bye:

=== Round 16 ===
Home	Score	Away	Match Information
Home	Score	Away	Date and Time	Venue
Bye:

=== Round 17 ===
Home	Score	Away	Match Information
Home	Score	Away	Date and Time	Venue
Bye:

=== Round 18 ===
Home	Score	Away	Match Information
Home	Score	Away	Date and Time	Venue
Bye:

=== Round 19 ===
Home	Score	Away	Match Information
Home	Score	Away	Date and Time	Venue
Bye:

=== Round 20 ===
Home	Score	Away	Match Information
Home	Score	Away	Date and Time	Venue
Bye:

=== Round 21 ===
Home	Score	Away	Match Information
Home	Score	Away	Date and Time	Venue
Bye:

=== Round 22 ===
Home	Score	Away	Match Information
Home	Score	Away	Date and Time	Venue
Bye:

=== Round 23 ===
Home	Score	Away	Match Information
Home	Score	Away	Date and Time	Venue
Bye:

=== Round 24 ===
Home	Score	Away	Match Information
Home	Score	Away	Date and Time	Venue
Bye:

== Finals series ==
For the fourth year in a row, the NSWRL will use the finals system previously implemented by the ARL competition from the 1990s (also used by the Australian Football League) to decide the grand finalists from the top eight finishing teams.

Home	Score	Away	Match Information
Home	Score	Away	Date and Time (Local)	Venue	Referees	Crowd
QUALIFYING & ELIMINATION FINALS
Wentworthville Magpies	34-6	Asquith Magpies	6 September 2015 - 3pm	Ringrose Park
Guildford Owls	22-24	Auburn Warriors	6 September 2015 - 2pm	Leichhardt Oval
Mounties	24-32	Windsor Wolves	6 September 2015 - 4pm	Ringrose Park
Concord-Burwood Wolves	6-50	Blacktown Workers	6 September 2015 - 4pm	Leichhardt Oval
SEMI FINALS
Mounties	36-4	Auburn Warriors	12 September 2015 - 2pm	Belmore Sports Ground
Asquith Magpies	38-14	Blacktown Workers	12 September 2015 - 3pm	Ringrose Park
PRELIMINARY FINALS
Windsor Wolves	30-32	Asquith Magpies	19 September 2015 - 2pm	New Era Stadium
Wentworthville Magpies	2-12	Mounties	20 September 2015	Leichhardt Oval
GRAND FINAL
Mounties	30-14	Asquith	27 September 2015	Pirtek Stadium	Daniel Olford

=== Chart ===
Qualifying and elimination finals
Ringrose Park
1	Mounties	24
4	Windsor Wolves	32
Leichhardt Oval
5	Guildford Owls	22
8	Auburn Warriors	24
Leichhardt Oval
6	Concord-Burwood Wolves	6
7	Blacktown Workers	50
Ringrose Park
2	Wentworthville Magpies	34
3	Asquith Magpies	6

Semi-finals
Belmore Sports Ground
Mounties	36
Auburn Warriors	4
Ringrose Park
Asquith Magpies	38
Blacktown Workers	14

Preliminary finals
New Era Stadium
Windsor Wolves	30
Asquith Magpies	32
Leichhardt Oval
Wentworthville Magpies	2
Mounties	12

Grand final
Pirtek Stadium
Mounties	30
Asquith	14

== See also ==
- 2015 New South Wales Cup season
- New South Wales Rugby League
- Country Rugby League
