= 2021 Western Premier League season =

WPL
- Season: 2021
- Champions: Not awarded
- Premiers: Not awarded
- Matches played: 68
- Goals scored: 300 (4.41 per match)
- Top goalscorer: 10 goals - Alec Bateson (Parkes Cobras); Jacob Soetens-Chidiac (Panorama)
- Biggest home win: Orana Spurs 6–0 Lithgow Workmen's (31 July)
- Biggest away win: Mudgee Wolves 0–7 Barnstoneworth United (22 May)
- Highest scoring: Orange Waratahs 8–5 Macquarie United (17 April)

The 2021 Western Premier League, also called the Burmac Western Premier League for sponsorship reasons, was the 21st season of the Western Premier League (WPL), the top football league in the Central West region of New South Wales. It was the second consecutive year that the competition ran, after an eight-year hiatus. Dubbo Bulls were the defending champions after defeating city rivals Macquarie United in the grand final at Apex Oval, whilst Macquarie United were the defending premiers.

The season saw the competition expand to nine teams for this season, two more than last year, with the addition of four-time champions Orange Waratahs, who last played in the WPL during the 2012 season, and Mudgee Wolves, who last played in the WPL during the 1997 season.

The season was ultimately cancelled after 17 rounds due to COVID-19 lockdown and no title was awarded. At the time of the competition's cancellation, Orana Spurs lead the competition two points ahead of Orange Waratahs, with just one round to play before finals.

== Season summary ==
The 2021 season kicked-off with an Orange local derby when Orange Waratahs, who was making its return to the WPL, played Barnstoneworth United at Waratah Sports Ground. The match finished 1-all.

In July, following a COVID-19 lockdown for the Orange, Blayney and Cabonne local government areas, the round 15 match between Panorama and Barnstoneworth United was postponed, with Macquarie United and Parkes Cobras postponed too, as the latter had a number of players living or working in the Cabonne area.

The entire final round of the competition, scheduled to be played on 14 August, was postponed due to the COVID-19 lockdown in Dubbo. The final round was originally pushed back by one week but as the Dubbo lockdown continued and all of New South Wales was put into lockdown on 14 August, the competition was postponed indefinitely. After the announcement that the lockdown for regional New South Wales would be extended to September, the competition was ultimately abandoned on August 26. While Orana Spurs lead Orange Waratahs by two points on the ladder, no title was officially awarded.

== Teams ==
Locations of the 2021 WPL clubs.

=== Home venues and locations ===
Team	Location	Home ground
Barnstoneworth United	Orange	Jack Brabham Park
Dubbo Bulls	Dubbo	Lady Cutler Oval
Lithgow Workmen's	Lithgow	Marjorie Jackson Oval
Macquarie United	Dubbo	Hans Claven Oval
Mudgee Wolves	Mudgee	Glen Willow Regional Sports Stadium
Orana Spurs	Dubbo	Lady Cutler Oval
Orange Waratahs	Orange	Waratah Sports Ground
Panorama	Bathurst	Proctor Park
Parkes Cobras	Parkes	Woodward Oval

=== Personal and kits ===
Team	Head coach	Captain	Kit manufacturer	Kit sponsor
Barnstoneworth United	Josh Ward	Duncan Logan	KonQa	Tilstons Electrical
Dubbo Bulls	James Leonard; Kobe Rapley	James Leonard; Kobe Rapley		Lindsay Mumford Suzuki
Lithgow Workmen's	Brad Luka	Brad Luka	Kookaburra	Hunter Mining Methods
Macquarie United	Paul Crain	Rhys Osborne	Puma	Castlereagh Hotel, Dubbo
Mudgee Wolves	Christopher Clegg; Harry Hall; Chad Bowmaker	Lindsay Henderson	Gioca	Kelly's Irish Pub, Mudgee
Orana Spurs	Benjamin Mason	Jared Corby	Puma	South Dubbo Tavern
Orange Waratahs	Adam Scimone	Adam Scimone		Country Fruit Distributors
Panorama	Brent Osborne	Ricky Guihot	Nike	Agile Arbor Tree Services
Parkes Cobras	Meghan Kempson	Brent Tucker	Goosey	Coachman Hotel Motel, Parkes

== Regular season ==
=== Ladder ===
Pos	Team	Pld	W	D	L	GF	GA	GD	Pts
1	Orana Spurs	15	12	1	2	47	23	+24	37
2	Orange Waratahs	15	11	2	2	43	26	+17	35
3	Dubbo Bulls	15	9	3	3	40	25	+15	30
4	Barnstoneworth United	15	7	4	4	34	22	+12	25
5	Parkes Cobras	15	5	3	7	29	32	−3	18
6	Panorama	15	5	3	7	30	36	−6	18
7	Macquarie United	15	4	2	9	30	38	−8	14
8	Mudgee Wolves	16	2	2	12	27	48	−21	8
9	Lithgow Workmen's	15	2	2	11	20	50	−30	8

Updated to match(es) played on 11 August 2021. Source: Western NSW Football
Rules for classification: 1) points; 2) goal difference; 3) number of goals scored.

=== Results ===
Home \ Away	BU	DB	LW	MQ	MW	OS	OW	PA	PC
Barnstoneworth United	—	1–3	2–1	2–1	3–2	Canc.	2–3	5–0	3–3
Dubbo Bulls	2–1	—	7–2	2–2	3–1	0–1	2–2	3–1	4–2
Lithgow Workmen's	3–3	0–6	—	3–2	0–6	1–3	1–2	0–3	Canc.
Macquarie United	1–2	1–0	3–2	—	3–1	3–4	Canc.	3–3	2–3
Mudgee Wolves	0–7	4–4	1–4	0–2	—	2–2	2–4	4–3	0–2
Orana Spurs	1–0	1–2	6–0	4–0	2–1	—	4–2	7–2	5–3
Orange Waratahs	1–1	6–1	2–1	8–5	3–1	3–1	—	2–1	3–1
Panorama	1–1	Canc.	2–0	1–0	3–1	3–4	1–2	—	2–0
Parkes Cobras	0–1	0–1	2–2	3–2	3–1	1–2	2–0	4–4	—

Updated to match(es) played on 17 July 2021. Source: Western NSW Football
Legend: Blue = home team win; Yellow = draw; Red = away team win.

== Top goal scorers ==
As of 11 August 2021

Rank	Player	Club	Goals
1	Alec Bateson	Parkes Cobras	10
1	Jacob Soetens-Chidiac	Panorama	10
3	Brody Austin	Dubbo Bulls	9
3	Justin Gibson	Orana Spurs	9
3	Craig Sugden	Orange Waratahs	9
6	Guy Burgess	Orange Waratahs	8
8	Justin Sutton	Macquarie United	7
8	Kenny McCall	Barnstoneworth United	7
8	Joel Tongue	Orana Spurs	7
8	Jake Ferguson	Orana Spurs	7
