= Western Premier League =

Football League in Australia

- Founded: 1994 (reformed in 2020)
- Country: Australia
- Number of clubs: 6
- Level on pyramid: 5
- Current champions: Dubbo Bulls (5th title) (2026)
- Current premiers: Bathurst 75 (11th title) (2026)
- Current: 2026 Western Premier League season

The Western Premier League is a regional Australian association football league, comprising teams from the Central West region of New South Wales. The competition is run under the Western NSW Football body, an associate of Football NSW - a member federation of Football Australia. It fits below the national A-League and NSW wide divisions including National Premier Leagues NSW, being level 5 league in the Australian league system.

== History ==
The Western Premier League was founded in 1994 as the Central West Soccer League, with East Dubbo United taking out the inaugural championship, defeating Bathurst 75 on penalties 4–3 in the grand final, after the score was locked at 2-all at the end of extra-time.

The competition ran from 1994 until the end of 2012 before collapsing after Westside Panthers and Dubbo Bulls all pulled out in quick succession, leaving just three teams in the competition. The competition was later revived ahead of the 2020 season, with nine teams initially entering the first WPL season in eight years, later reduced to seven teams by July when the season commenced after a delay caused by the COVID-19 pandemic.

== Format ==
As of the 2026 season, the competition consists of six teams from around the Central West region of New South Wales. Each team will play each other three times, to form a 15-round, round robin format. The finals format involves the top four team, played under the Page–McIntyre top four system The grand final to determine the champion will be held at the ground of the major semi-final winner.

== Current clubs and location ==
The following clubs will participate in the 2026 Western Premier League:

Locations of the 2023 WPL clubs.

Club	Location	Ground	Founded	Champions	Champions years
Bathurst 75	Bathurst	Proctor Park	1975	8	1996, 1997, 1998, 2002, 2003, 2005, 2023, 2024
Dubbo Bulls	Dubbo	Hans Claven Oval; Victoria Park; Apex Oval	2005	5	2010, 2011, 2012, 2020, 2026
Macquarie United (Dubbo)	Dubbo	Hans Claven Oval; Victoria Park; Apex Oval	2013	1	2025
Orange Waratahs	Orange	Waratah Sports Ground	1967	5	1995, 2000, 2006, 2007, 2022
Panorama	Bathurst	Proctor Park	2012	0	
Parkes Cobras	Parkes	Woodward Oval; Harrison Park	2020	0	

== Former clubs ==
Club	Location	Founded	Champions	Champions years	Current status
Barnstoneworth United	Orange	1998	0		Orange & District Football Association
Bathurst City Red Tops	Bathurst	1962	0		Bathurst District Football
Bathurst City Colts	Bathurst		0		Disbanded
Canobolas Rangers	Orange		1	1999	Orange & District Football Association
Cowra Wildcats	Cowra		0		Disbanded
East Dubbo United	Dubbo	1984	1	1994	Dubbo & District Football Association
Lithgow City Rangers	Lithgow	1970	0		Bathurst District Football
Lithgow Workmen's	Lithgow	1982	0		Bathurst District Football
Macquarie United (Bathurst)	Bathurst	1984	0		Bathurst District Football
Mudgee Wolves	Mudgee	1991	0		Bathurst District Football
Orana Spurs	Dubbo	1992	1	2001	Dubbo & District Football Association
Orange CYMS	Orange	1975	0		Orange & District Football Association
Oxford United	Bathurst		0		Disbanded
SASS Strikers	Dubbo	1983	0		Dubbo & District Football Association
Westside Panthers	Dubbo	1979	3	2004, 2008, 2009	Dubbo & District Football Association
Young Rebels	Young		0		Disbanded

== Grand final results ==
Key to list of winners
*	Match went to extra time
†	Match decided via a penalty shoot-out after extra time
‡	Winning team won the Double (Grand final and minor premiership)

Western Premier League grand finals
Season	Winners	Score	Runners–up	Venue	Venue's city/town	Minor premiers	Teams
1994	East Dubbo United	2–2†	Bathurst 75	Marjorie Jackson Oval	Lithgow		6
1995	Orange Waratahs	1–0	Canobolas Rangers	Alec Lamberton Field	Bathurst		7
1996	Bathurst 75	3–0	Macquarie United (Bathurst)	Waratah Sports Ground	Orange	Bathurst 75	6
1997	Bathurst 75	1–0	Orange CYMS	Alec Lamberton Field	Bathurst	Bathurst 75	6
1998	Bathurst 75	3–0	Orange Waratahs	Waratah Sports Ground	Orange	Bathurst 75	7
1999	Canobolas Rangers	3–0	Orange CYMS	Jack Brabham Park	Orange	Orange Waratahs	8
2000	Orange Waratahs	3–1	Orange CYMS	Waratah Sports Ground	Orange	Orange Waratahs	8
2001	Orana Spurs	2–1	East Dubbo United	Lady Cutler Oval	Dubbo	East Dubbo United	8
2002	Bathurst 75	3–2	Westside Panthers	Lady Cutler Oval	Dubbo	Westside Panthers	8
2003	Bathurst 75	0–0†	Canobolas Rangers	Alec Lamberton Field	Bathurst	Bathurst 75	8
2004	Westside Panthers	1–0	Bathurst 75	Lady Cutler Oval	Dubbo	Westside Panthers	7
2005	Bathurst 75	1–0	Dubbo Bulls	Alec Lamberton Field	Bathurst	Bathurst 75	6
2006	Orange Waratahs	0–0†	Bathurst 75	Alec Lamberton Field	Bathurst	Bathurst 75	7
2007	Orange Waratahs	1–0	Bathurst 75	Alec Lamberton Field	Bathurst	Bathurst 75	7
2008	Westside Panthers	3–3†	Bathurst 75	Lady Cutler Oval	Dubbo	Westside Panthers	7
2009	Westside Panthers	3–3†	Orange Waratahs	Jack Brabham Park	Orange	Orange Waratahs	6
2010	Dubbo Bulls	1–1†	Orange Waratahs	Lady Cutler Oval	Dubbo	Orange Waratahs	6
2011	Dubbo Bulls	3–1	Westside Panthers	Lady Cutler Oval	Dubbo	Dubbo Bulls	5
2012	Dubbo Bulls	3–1	Orange Waratahs	Waratah Sports Ground	Orange	Dubbo Bulls	5
Competition disbanded between 2013-2019
2020	Dubbo Bulls	2–1	Macquarie United (Dubbo)	Apex Oval	Dubbo	Macquarie United (Dubbo)	7
2021	Season cancelled after 17 rounds due to COVID-19 lockdown. No title awarded.						9
2022	Orange Waratahs	2–1	Panorama	Waratah Sports Ground	Orange	Orange Waratahs	11
2023	Bathurst 75	2–1	Barnstoneworth United	Proctor Park	Bathurst	Bathurst 75	8
2024	Bathurst 75	3–0	Dubbo Bulls	Proctor Park	Bathurst	Bathurst 75	7
2025	Macquarie United (Dubbo)	3–2	Bathurst 75	Victoria Park	Dubbo	Bathurst 75	6
2026	Dubbo Bulls	2–1	Bathurst 75	Proctor Park	Bathurst	Bathurst 75	6

== Performance by club ==
There are seven clubs who have won the Western Premier League title.

Teams in bold compete in the Western Premier League as of the 2022 season.

Club	Winners	Runners-up	Winning years	Runners-up years
**Bathurst 75**	8	6	1996, 1997, 1998, 2002, 2003, 2005, 2023, 2024	1994, 2004, 2006, 2007, 2008, 2025, 2026
**Orange Waratahs**	5	4	1995, 2000, 2006, 2007, 2022	1998, 2009, 2010 2012
**Dubbo Bulls**	5	2	2010, 2011, 2012, 2020, 2026	2005, 2024
Westside Panthers	3	2	2004, 2008, 2009	2002, 2011
Canobolas Rangers	1	2	1999	1995, 2003
East Dubbo United	1	1	1994	2001
**Macquarie United (Dubbo)**	1	1	2025	2020
Orana Spurs	1	0	2001	
Orange CYMS	0	3		1997, 1999, 2000
Macquarie United (Bathurst)	0	1		1996
**Panorama**	0	1		2022
Barnstoneworth United	0	1		2023

== Lower grades ==
=== Reserve Grade ===
- 1994 - Lithgow Workmen's
- 1995 - Canobolas Rangers
- 1996 - Bathurst 75
- 1997 - Bathurst 75
- 1998 - Bathurst 75
- 1999 - Canobolas Rangers
- 2000 - East Dubbo United
- 2001 - Bathurst 75
- 2002 - Bathurst 75
- 2003 - Orange Waratahs
- 2004 - Orana Spurs
- 2005 - Orange Waratahs
- 2006 - Bathurst 75
- 2007 - Canobolas Rangers
- 2008 - Orange Waratahs
- 2009 - Westside Panthers
- 2010 - Dubbo Bulls
- 2011 - Orange Waratahs
- 2012 - Dubbo Bulls

=== Under 18s ===
- 1995 - Canobolas Rangers
- 1996 - Cowra Wildcats
- 1999 - Lithgow City Rangers
- 2001 - Dubbo SASS
- 2002 - Dubbo SASS
- 2003 - Orana Spurs
- 2004 - Bathurst 75
- 2005 - Orange Waratahs
- 2006 - Dubbo Bulls
- 2007 - Westside Panthers
- 2008 - Westside Panthers
- 2009 - Orana Spurs
- 2010 - Lithgow Workmen's
- 2011 - Dubbo Bulls
- 2012 - Dubbo Bulls
