= 2020 Western Premier League season =

WPL
- Season: 2020
- Champions: Dubbo Bulls (4th title)
- Premiers: Macquarie United (Dubbo) (1st title)
- Matches played: 42
- Goals scored: 166 (3.95 per match)
- Top goalscorer: Jesse Spang 13 - (Macquarie United)
- Biggest home win: Macquarie United 6–1 Panorama (8 August 2020); Dubbo Bulls 5–0 Lithgow Workmen's (5 September 2020); Macquarie United 5–0 Lithgow Workmen's (19 September 2020)
- Biggest away win: Parkes Cobras 1–4 Dubbo Bulls (11 July 2020); Dubbo Bulls 2–5 Macquarie United (23 July 2020); Barnstoneworth United 2–5 Dubbo Bulls (26 July 2020); Orana Spurs 1–4 Parkes Cobras (15 August 2020); Orana Spurs 1–4 Macquarie United (22 August 2020)

The 2020 Western Premier League was the 20th season of the Western Premier League (WPL), the top football league in the Central West region of New South Wales. It was the first season of the competition since 2012. Dubbo Bulls were the three-time defending champions, having won the past three competitions in 2010, 2011 and 2012.

The season kicked-off with three games on 11 July, with the Parkes Cobras-Orana Spurs match at Woodward Park in Parkes the first to get underway, marking the first WPL match in eight years. The season concluded with the grand final on 26 September. Dubbo Bulls claimed a fourth WPL title after defeating local rivals Macquarie United in the grand final 2–1 at Apex Oval.

== Background and season summary ==
The previous iteration of the Western Premier League had originally folded at the end of 2012 season when Dubbo Westside and Dubbo Bulls FC all pulled out in quick succession, leaving just three teams in the competition. Talks continued towards the end of 2019 and in the early months of 2020 about reviving the competition before the competition's return was officially announced by Western NSW Football in February.

Nine teams originally nominated for the competition - former champions Dubbo Bulls and Orange Waratahs, as well as Barnstoneworth United, Lithgow Workmen's, Macquarie United (Dubbo), Orana Spurs, Panorama, the newly-formed Parkes Cobras and South Dubbo Wanderers. However, due to the COVID-19 pandemic, Waratahs and Wanderers withdraw from the competition before a ball was kicked. With two teams withdrawing and with restrictions in place by Football NSW and the NSW Government, the competition could not kick-off in April, as originally planned, and restrictions threatened to cancel the WPL's return. But as restrictions were lifted, the WPL got the green light to return in July and it kicked-off on the fourth of that month with three matches on the same day.

The first round of matches saw Parkes Cobras (a team formed specially for the WPL) host Orana Spurs at Woodward Oval, Macquarie United were away in Orange to face Barnstoneworth United and Dubbo Bulls would face Panorama at Lady Cutler Oval. Lithgow Workmen's had the bye. The Parkes-Orana match kicked-off at 3pm, 15 minutes before the game in Orange and an hour before the Bulls-Panorama match, meaning Cobras' 17th minute opener by Daniel Clarke was the first WPL goal in eight years. All matches in the opening round ended in 1-all stalemates.

The first wins of the 2020 WPL season came in the second round when Barnstoneworth United overcome Panorama 4–2 in Bathurst, Dubbo Bulls won 4–1 away at Parkes Cobras, and Lithgow Workmen's defeated Macquarie United 2–1.

At the halfway mark in the season, Macquarie United surprised many by leading the competition by two points over Lithgow Workmen's and Dubbo Bulls, in second and third respectively. The Paul Crain-coached Macquarie side had a team featuring a number of teenagers, carried over from its Dubbo and District Football Association A grade campaign from 2019. Many expected the youthful side to finish last, however, Macquarie would eventually finish the regular season in first place, claiming the Premiers' Plate, one point ahead of city rivals Dubbo Bulls in second.

In a fiery grand final, Dubbo Bulls claimed the title with a 2–1 winner over city rivals Macquarie United at Apex Oval.

== Teams ==
Locations of the 2020 WPL clubs.

=== Home venues and locations ===
Team	Location	Home ground
Barnstoneworth United	Orange	Jack Brabham Park
Dubbo Bulls	Dubbo	Lady Cutler Oval
Lithgow Workmen's	Lithgow	Marjorie Jackson Oval
Macquarie United	Dubbo	Hans Claven Oval
Orana Spurs	Dubbo	Lady Cutler Oval
Panorama	Bathurst	Proctor Park
Parkes Cobras	Parkes	Woodward Oval

=== Personal and kits ===
Team	Head coach	Captain	Kit manufacturer	Kit sponsor
Barnstoneworth United	Rob Dawson	Josh Summerson	Nike	N/A
Dubbo Bulls	Jason Schink	Scott Fox; Kobe Rapley		Lindsay Mumford Suzuki
Lithgow Workmen's	Martin Hunter	Ben Sheehan	Kookaburra Sport	Huesker
Macquarie United	Paul Crain	Rhys Osborne	Puma	Castlereagh Hotel
Orana Spurs	Jared Corby			South Dubbo Tavern
Panorama	Ricky Guihot	Ryan Peacock	Nike	Agile Arbor Tree Services
Parkes Cobras	Meaghan Kempson	Brent Tucker		Parkes Services Club

== Regular season ==
=== Ladder ===
Pos	Team	Pld	W	D	L	GF	GA	GD	Pts	
1	Macquarie United	12	7	1	4	34	21	+13	22	Premiers' Plate and Finals series
2	Dubbo Bulls (C)	12	6	3	3	25	16	+9	21	Finals series
3	Panorama	12	5	5	2	23	21	+2	20	Finals series
4	Lithgow Workmen's	12	5	3	4	24	24	0	18	Finals series
5	Barnstoneworth United	12	4	5	3	25	26	−1	17	
6	Orana Spurs	12	2	3	7	16	29	−13	9	
7	Parkes Cobras	12	2	2	8	19	29	−10	8	

Updated to match(es) played on 12 September 2020. Source:
Rules for classification: 1) points; 2) goal difference; 3) number of goals scored.
(C) Champions

=== Results ===
Home \ Away	BU	DB	LW	MQ	OS	PA	PC
Barnstoneworth United	—	2–5	3–3	1–1	1–1	2–2	4–2
Dubbo Bulls	2–0	—	5–0	2–5	1–1	1–1	1–2
Lithgow Workmen's	2–2	3–0	—	2–1	3–0	1–1	3–1
Macquarie United	0–2	0–2	4–1	—	4–1	6–1	4–2
Orana Spurs	5–2	0–1	3–1	1–4	—	1–3	1–4
Panorama	2–4	1–1	3–2	3–1	4–1	—	2–1
Parkes Cobras	1–2	1–4	1–3	3–4	1–1	0–0	—

Updated to match(es) played on 12 September 2020. Source:
Legend: Blue = home team win; Yellow = draw; Red = away team win.
For upcoming matches, an "a" indicates there is an article about the rivalry between the two participants.

== Finals series ==
=== Semi finals ===
19 September 2020	Dubbo Bulls	1–0	Panorama	Dubbo
15:00 AEST	Thomas Busch 19' (pen.)	Report		Stadium: Apex Oval

19 September 2020	Macquarie United	5–0	Lithgow Workmen's	Dubbo
17:00 AEST	Jesse Spang 28', 36' (pen.); Justin Sutton 19'; Will Grant 45'; Connor Crain 61'	Report		Stadium: Apex Oval

=== Grand final ===
26 September 2020	Macquarie United	1–2	Dubbo Bulls	Dubbo
20:00 AEST	Brad Matiuscenko	Report	Scott Fox	Stadium: Apex Oval

== Player stats ==
=== Top goal scorers ===
As of the end of the grand final, 26 September 2020

Rank	Player	Club	Goals
1	Jesse Spang	Macquarie United	13
2	Ben Sheehan	Lithgow Workmen's	7
2	Gareth Williams	Dubbo Bulls	7
4	Logan Inwood	Lithgow Workmen's	6
4	Lachlan McHatton	Barnstoneworth United	6
6	Angus Cusack	Orana Spurs	5
6	Blake Medlyn	Parkes Cobras	5
6	Ryan Peacock	Panorama	5
6	Justin Pickering	Macquarie United	5
6	Jacob Soetens-Chidac	Panorama	5

=== Hat-tricks ===
Player	For	Against	Result	Date	Ref
Ben Sheehan	Lithgow Workmen's	Parkes Cobras	3–1	26 July 2020	
Jesse Spang	Macquarie United	Orana Spurs	4–1	26 July 2020	
Jake Grady	Orana Spurs	Barnstoneworth United	5–2	1 August 2020	
Lachlan McHatton	Barnstoneworth United	Parkes Cobras	4–2	8 August 2020	
Jesse Spang	Macquarie United	Orana Spurs	4–1	22 August 2020	
