= Luke Gale (rugby league, born 1999) =

Australian rugby league footballer (born 1999)

Personal information
- Born: 24 August 1999 (age 27) Sydney, New South Wales, Australia

Playing information
- Position: Second-row, Lock
Club
Years	Team	Pld	T	G	FG	P
2026–	Brisbane Broncos	1	0	0	0	0
- Source: RLP

Luke Gale (born 24 August 1999) is an Australian rugby league footballer for the Brisbane Broncos in the National Rugby League (NRL).

== Early life ==
Gale grew up in the New South Wales country town of Gilgandra, where he attended the local high school, until completing his final two years of schooling at Dubbo Senior College.

== Career ==
A Gilgandra Panthers product, Gale plays as a forward and was a Country NSW under-18s representative player. He played in the Jersey Flegg Cup and NSW Cup for the St. George Illawarra Dragons prior to joining the Broncos, subsequently playing with Wynnum-Manly's Queensland Cup side from 2022 to 2025.

After moving to the Burleigh Bears in 2026, Gale was named 19th man for the Broncos in a match against Cronulla-Sutherland at Suncorp, where he made his first-grade debut as a first-half replacement for Brendan Piakura.
