= Arthur Collinson =

Australian rugby league player

Personal information
- Full name: Arthur Leonard Collinson
- Born: 11 September 1929; Werris Creek, NSW, Australia
- Died: 5 January 1987 (aged 57); Wallsend, NSW, Australia

Playing information
- Position: Second row / Lock
Club
Years	Team	Pld	T	G	FG	P
1951–53	Western Suburbs	40	20	0	0	60
Representative
Years	Team	Pld	T	G	FG	P
1953	New South Wales	3	2	0	0	6
1952	Australia	3	0	0	0	0

Arthur Leonard Collinson (11 September 1929 – 5 January 1987) was an Australian rugby league player.

== Biography ==
Collinson was born in Werris Creek, near Tamworth, and grew up in the Newcastle suburb of Stockton. He began his rugby league career with North Newcastle, making his first grade debut at age 19.

A forward, Collinson competed with Western Suburbs from 1951 to 1953, used mainly as a second rower. He made 11 appearances in their premiership-winning 1952 season, but missed the grand final win over South Sydney, which took place while he was touring Europe with the national team. Capped in three Test matches, Collinson featured twice against Great Britain and once against France, playing in the lock position.

Collinson left Western Suburbs in 1954 to captain-coach Thirroul and led the Wollongong-based club to a premiership in his first season, which was followed by several further coaching roles throughout the state, with Port Macquarie, Wauchope, Toronto, Central Newcastle and Kurri Kurri. He also had charge of the Newcastle representative team that defeated the 1962 British tourists.
