= Kyle Lovett =

Australian rugby league footballer & actor

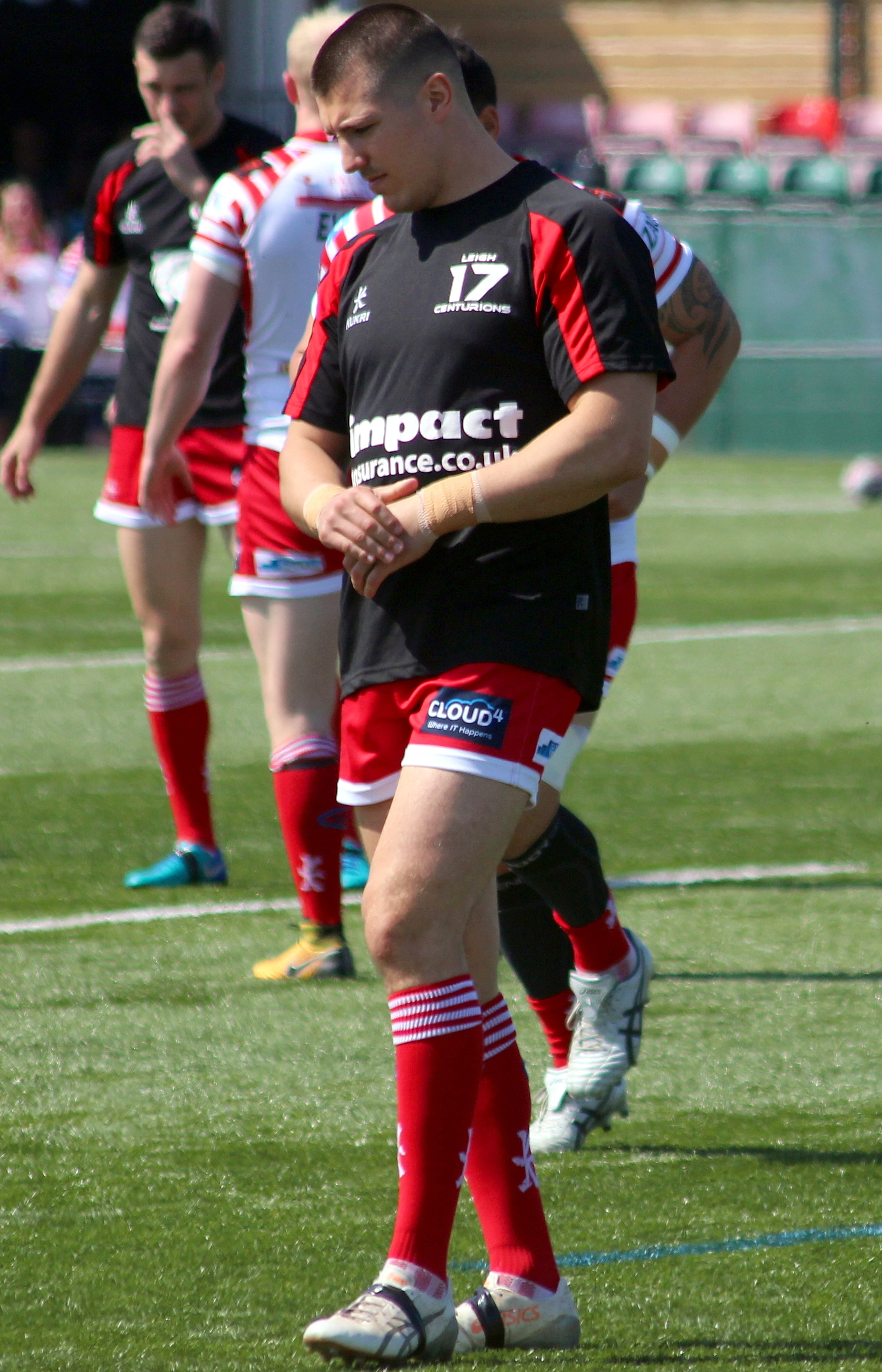

Personal information
- Born: 23 March 1993 (age 33) Leichhardt, New South Wales, Australia
- Height: 184 cm (6 ft 0 in)
- Weight: 100 kg (15 st 10 lb)

Playing information
- Position: Second-row, Lock, Hooker
Club
Years	Team	Pld	T	G	FG	P
2015–17	Wests Tigers	50	2	0	0	8
2018	Leigh Centurions	10	4	0	0	12
2018(loan)	→Workington Town	1	0	0	0	0
	Total	61	6	0	0	20
Representative
Years	Team	Pld	T	G	FG	P
2016	City Origin	1	1	0	0	4
- Source: As of 12 August 2018

Kyle Lovett (born 23 March 1993) is an Australian professional rugby league footballer who previously played for the Wests Tigers in the National Rugby League and the Leigh Centurions in the Championship. He primarily played as a second-row, but could also fill in as a centre. Lovett is also an aspiring actor, writing, producing, directing & starring in the short film, "Boys Light Up".

== Background ==
Born in Leichhardt, New South Wales, Lovett played his junior football for Leichhardt Wanderers Five Dock RSL and the Leichhardt Juniors before being signed by the Wests Tigers.

== Playing career ==
In 2012, and 2013, Lovett played for the Wests Tigers' NYC team. He was named the team's Player of the Year for both seasons and captained the side as they won the grand final in 2012. In April 2013, he played for the New South Wales Under-20s team.

On 18 July 2013, Lovett re-signed with the Tigers on a 1-year contract. In 2014, Lovett moved on to the Tigers' New South Wales Cup team, and was again named that team's Player of the Year.

In Round 1 of the 2015 NRL season, Lovett made his NRL debut for the Tigers against the Gold Coast Titans. Lovett played in the centres, coming into the side as a late replacement for Chris Lawrence. The Tigers won the game with a late field goal, and Lovett said, "I could never ask for a better round one debut. To win by a field goal. It's the best feeling I've ever had." After an injury to Dene Halatau, Lovett returned to first grade in round 4, playing in the second row. He scored his first NRL try early in the game, running onto a Luke Brooks pass near the try-line.

On 20 August 2015, Lovett re-signed with the Tigers on a 2-year contract. He made 21 appearances during the season, mostly playing second-row or starting from the bench. Making 663 tackles, he was second only to Robbie Farah at Wests Tigers. He was named the team's NRL Rookie of the Year. He said, "I just feel really honoured to not only have this award, but also to have been given the opportunity to play as many games and minutes as I did this season. I've talked to a few of the older boys and I think the best part about it is getting so much experience under my belt in one year."

With Robbie Farah unavailable for the first game of 2016, Lovett played some time at hooker and scored a try. In May he made his representative debut with City, and scored a try as he, "ran the perfect line to stroll over from close range.".

On 23 December 2016, Lovett was pulled over by NSW Police who were conducting random breath testing in The Sydney suburb of Pyrmont. Officers noticed that Lovett was sweating profusely and he was questioned if there was anything in the vehicle. After searching the vehicle, officers found white powder near the drivers seat and they performed a search on Lovett. Lovett admitted he was carrying drugs and pulled out a bag of cocaine from his underpants. Police also discovered an MDMA tablet in the vehicle but Lovett denied that this belonged to him. Lovett was then issued a field notice to attend court over the matter.

On 1 February 2017, Lovett pleaded guilty at Downing Centre Local Court and was given a 6-month good behaviour bond by the magistrate. Lovett was stood down by The Wests Tigers and missed The Auckland Nines tournament as a result.

On 17 November 2017, Lovett signed a 2-year contract with English side Leigh Centurions after being told his contract would not be renewed by The Wests Tigers.

In 2019, Lovett joined Ron Massey Cup side the Concord-Burwood-Glebe Wolves.
