= 2019 Jersey Flegg Cup =

- Teams: 14
- Matches played: 42

The 2019 Jersey Flegg Cup season is the 49th season of the under-20 competition. The competition is administered by the New South Wales Rugby League and mirrors the draw and structure of its senior counterpart the Canterbury Cup. The Cronulla-Sutherland Sharks are the defending premiers.

== Teams ==
The 2019 season features 14 teams, with the nine based in Sydney, one in Newcastle, one in Wollongong, one in Auckland, one in Canberra and one in Victoria. The Victoria Thunderbolts joined the competition in 2019 from the Queensland-based Hastings Deering Colts competition, while the Canberra Raiders and South Sydney Rabbitohs join after using their Canterbury Cup affiliates in 2018.

Colours	Club	Home ground(s)	Head coach(s)	Captain(s)	NRL affiliated
	Canberra Raiders	GIO Stadium Seiffert Oval	Ash Barnes	None	Canberra Raiders
	Canterbury-Bankstown Bulldogs	Belmore Sports Ground	David Penna	Javvier Pitovao	Canterbury-Bankstown Bulldogs
	Cronulla-Sutherland Sharks	PointsBet Stadium	Daniel Holdsworth	Monty Raper	Cronulla-Sutherland Sharks
	Manly Warringah Sea Eagles	Lottoland; HE Laybutt Sporting Complex	Matt Ballin	Keith Titmuss	Manly Warringah Sea Eagles
	Newcastle Knights	McDonald Jones Stadium	Scott Dureau	Josh Wilkinson	Newcastle Knights
	North Sydney Bears	North Sydney Oval	Peter Palmer	Will Lawson	Sydney Roosters
	Parramatta Eels	Bankwest Stadium; McCredie Park; Ringrose Park	Dean Feeney	Jesse Cronin & John Fonua	Parramatta Eels
	Penrith Panthers	Panthers Stadium	Ben Harden	J'maine Hopgood	Penrith Panthers
	South Sydney Rabbitohs	Metricon High Performance Centre	Ben Rogers	Blake Taaffe	South Sydney Rabbitohs
	St George Illawarra Dragons	WIN Stadium; Netstrata Jubilee Stadium	Willie Talau	Luke Gale	St George Illawarra Dragons
	Sydney Roosters	North Sydney Oval	Anthony Barnes	None	Sydney Roosters
	Warriors	Mt Smart Stadium	Greg Boulous	Tyler Slade	Warriors
	Wests Tigers	Campbelltown Stadium; Leichhardt Oval	Wayne Lambkin	Jock Madden	Wests Tigers

== Ladder ==
2019 Jersey Flegg Cup
Pos	Team	Pld	W	D	L	B	PF	PA	PD	Pts
1	Canberra Raiders	2	1	1	0	0	39	35	+4	3
2	Cronulla-Sutherland Sharks	1	1	0	0	0	34	0	+34	2
3	Canterbury-Bankstown Bulldogs	1	1	0	0	0	36	10	+26	2
4	Sydney Roosters	1	1	0	0	0	40	18	+22	2
5	Penrith Panthers	1	1	0	0	0	24	18	+6	2
6	New Zealand Warriors	1	0	1	0	0	28	28	0	1
7	South Sydney Rabbitohs	1	0	1	0	0	28	28	0	1
8	St. George Illawarra Dragons	1	0	1	0	0	28	28	0	1
9	Wests Tigers	1	0	1	0	0	28	28	0	1
10	Victoria Thunderbolts	1	0	1	0	0	21	21	0	1
11	Newcastle Knights	2	0	0	2	0	32	42	-10	0
12	Manly-Warringah Sea Eagles	1	0	0	1	0	18	40	-22	0
13	Parramatta Eels	1	0	0	1	0	10	36	-26	0
14	North Sydney Bears	1	0	0	1	0	0	34	-34	0
