= Michael Sorridimi =

Australian rugby league footballer

Michel Sorridimi
Personal information
- Full name: Michel Sorridimi
- Born: 5 November 1956 (age 69) Sydney, New South Wales, Australia

Playing information
- Height: 5 ft 9 in (175 cm)
- Weight: 11 st 7 lb (161 lb; 73 kg)
- Position: Wing
Club
Years	Team	Pld	T	G	FG	P
1975–82	St George Dragons	82	31	0	0	93

Michel Sorridimi (born 5 November 1956) is an Australian former rugby league footballer who played in the 1970s and 1980s.

== Career ==
A St George Dragons junior from the Kingsgrove Colts, Michel 'Zorro' Sorridimi was graded in 1974. Sorridimi played eight first grade seasons with St George and won a premiership with the club in 1979 playing on the wing in the victory over the Canterbury-Bankstown Bulldogs. A crowd favourite at Kogarah's Jubilee Oval, Sorridimi's career was curtailed by injury in the early 1980s, and he retired in 1982.
