= Panorama FC =

Panorama
- Full name: Panorama Football Club
- Nickname: The Goats
- Founded: 2012
- Ground: Proctor Park, Bathurst
- League: Western Premier League
- 2020: 3rd
- Website: http://www.panoramafc.com/
Home colours	Away colours

Panorama FC is an amateur association football club based in Bathurst, New South Wales, Australia. The club was formed in 2012 and currently competes in the Western Premier League (WPL). It also has clubs in the local Bathurst District Football junior and senior competitions.

== History ==
Panorama FC were formed in 2012 with two teams competing in local Bathurst District Football senior grade competition. The club has since grown to more than 10 teams in the local senior grade competition, claiming its maiden Bathurst District Football Premier League title in both men's and women's in 2018.

Panorama was also a founding member of the revived Western Premier League competition for the 2020 season. The Goats also competed in the FFA Cup for the first time in 2020, going down to Central Coast Premier League side Southern & Ettalong FC 7–3 in the second round of qualifying. The remaining qualifying rounds and competition proper were cancelled in May because of the COVID-19 pandemic.

Panorama currently play all of its home games at Proctor Park, however, the club has expressed its desire to use Alec Lamberton Field, the former ground of Bathurst '75, which has since become derelict after the former tenant abandon the ground at the end of 2012.

== Honours ==
- Bathurst District Football Men's Premier League

Winners (1): 2018
Runners-Up (1): 2017

- Bathurst District Football Men's Second Grade

Winners (1): 2019

- Bathurst District Football Men's Third Grade

Winners (1): 2016
Runners-UP (1): 2020

- Bathurst District Football Men's Fourth Grade

Winners (1): 2020

- Bathurst District Football Women's Premier League

Winners (2): 2018, 2020
Runners-Up (2): 2017, 2019

- Bathurst District Football Women's Third Grade

Winners (1): 2017, 2020
