= 2018 Jersey Flegg Cup season =

2018 Jersey Flegg Cup
- Teams: 12
- Premiers: Cronulla-Sutherland Sharks (1st title)
- Minor premiers: Newcastle Knights
- Matches played: 129
- Points scored: 5,692
- Top points scorer(s): Kurtis Dark (204)
- Player of the year: Beau Fermor
- Top try-scorer(s): Beau Fermor (14)

The 2018 Jersey Flegg Cup season was the 48th season of the under-20 competition and the first since 2007. The competition, administered by the New South Wales Rugby League, replaced the National Rugby League's National Youth Competition, and mirrored the draw and structure of its senior counterpart, the Intrust Super Premiership.

The Cronulla-Sutherland Sharks defeated the Penrith Panthers in the Grand Final, winning their first Jersey Flegg Cup premiership.

== Teams ==
The 2018 season featured 12 teams, nine based in Sydney, one in Newcastle, one in Wollongong and one in Auckland. 10 NRL clubs fielded a side in the competition, while two others, the Canberra Raiders and South Sydney Rabbitohs, fielded a side through their Intrust Super Premiership affiliated club.

Colours	Club	Home ground(s)	Head coach(s)	Captain(s)	NRL affiliated
	Canterbury-Bankstown Bulldogs	Belmore Sports Ground	Brad Henderson	Morgan Harper & Samuel Radovu	Canterbury-Bankstown Bulldogs
	Cronulla-Sutherland Sharks	Southern Cross Group Stadium; Henson Park	David Howlett	Teig Wilton	Cronulla-Sutherland Sharks
	Manly Warringah Sea Eagles	Lottoland; HE Laybutt Sporting Complex	Wayne Lambkin	Cade Cust & Tevita Funa	Manly Warringah Sea Eagles
	Mounties	Aubrey Keech Reserve	Peter Marrapodi	Paul Roache	Canberra Raiders
	Newcastle Knights	Cessnock Sportsground; McDonald Jones Stadium	Todd Lowrie	Hayden Loughrey	Newcastle Knights
	North Sydney Bears	North Sydney Oval	Willie Leyshon	Josh Cook	South Sydney Rabbitohs
	Parramatta Eels	Ringrose Park	Dean Feeney	Tuimavave Afualo	Parramatta Eels
	Penrith Panthers	Panthers Stadium	Ben Harden	Mitch Kenny	Penrith Panthers
	St George Illawarra Dragons	WIN Stadium; Jubilee Oval	Wayne Collins	Jackson Willis	St George Illawarra Dragons
	Sydney Roosters	Allianz Stadium; Morry Breen Oval	Anthony Barnes	Sean O'Sullivan & Kenese Kenese	Sydney Roosters
	Warriors	Mt Smart Stadium; QBE Stadium	Ricky Henry	Soane Hufanga & Tyler Slade	Warriors
	Wests Tigers	Campbelltown Stadium; Leichhardt Oval	Craig Wilson	TJ Carter	Wests Tigers

== Regular season ==
Team	1	2	3	4	5	6	7	8	9	10	11	12	13	14	15	16	17	18	19	20	21	22	23	24
Canterbury Bulldogs	**WST**; **20**	**WAR**; **18**	**MOU**; **6**	X	SYD; 12	**PEN**; **20**	CRO; 2	MAN; 40	X	X	NEW; 2	**SYD**; **2**	**CRO**; **16**	**NOR**; **24**	PEN; 2	X	MOU; 22	**NEW**; **12**	WST; 16	WAR; 6	**SGI**; **2**	**MAN**; **2**	NOR; 26	**PAR**; **12**
Cronulla Sharks	SYD; 24	**SGI**; **4**	**MAN**; **2**	X	SGI; 0	**NEW**; **6**	**CBY**; **2**	**WAR**; **6**	X	X	SYD; 0	**WST**; **8**	CBY; 16	**PAR**; **36**	MOU; 10	X	NEW; 6	**NOR**; **36**	PAR; 6	PEN; 1	MAN; 34	**NOR**; **26**	WAR; 12	WST; 32
Manly Sea Eagles	**NEW**; **48**	PAR; 32	CRO; 2	**MOU**; **16**	PAR; 8	**WAR**; **20**	**SYD**; **24**	**CBY**; **40**	X	X	**NOR**; **6**	WAR; 22	NOR; 26	**WST**; **5**	**SGI**; **20**	X	WST; 38	SYD; 2	MOU; 10	X	**CRO**; **34**	CBY; 2	SGI; 2	PEN; 10
Mounties	**SGI**; **8**	SYD; 6	CBY; 6	MAN; 16	PEN; 16	PAR; 2	**NOR**; **14**	**SYD**; **30**	X	X	PAR; 8	**PEN**; **20**	NEW; 6	**WAR**; **20**	**CRO**; **10**	X	**CBY**; **22**	**WST**; **6**	**MAN**; **10**	NOR; 28	**NEW**; **36**	WST; 20	X	SGI; 4
Newcastle Knights	MAN; 48	WST; 22	**PAR**; **8**	**SGI**; **20**	NOR; 22	CRO; 6	**WST**; **14**	**NOR**; **10**	X	X	**CBY**; **2**	SGI; 4	**MOU**; **6**	SYD; 10	WAR; 48	X	**CRO**; **6**	CBY; 12	PEN; 14	PAR; 14	MOU; 36	**WAR**; **48**	**PEN**; **2**	X
North Sydney Bears	**WAR**; **8**	**PEN**; **10**	**SGI**; **26**	**PEN**; **7**	**NEW**; **22**	WST; 22	MOU; 14	NEW; 10	X	X	MAN; 6	**PAR**; **32**	**MAN**; **26**	CBY; 24	**WST**; **26**	X	**SYD**; **16**	CRO; 36	SGI; 30	**MOU**; **28**	X	CRO; 26	**CBY**; **26**	WAR; 24
Parramatta Eels	**PEN**; **8**	**MAN**; **32**	NEW; 8	**WST**; **14**	**MAN**; **8**	**MOU**; **2**	PEN; 4	WST; 12	X	X	**MOU**; **8**	NOR; 32	WAR; 16	CRO; 36	**SYD**; **26**	X	**WAR**; **8**	**SGI**; **32**	**CRO**; **6**	**NEW**; **14**	SYD; 18	SGI; 18	X	CBY; 12
Penrith Panthers	PAR; 8	NOR; 10	WAR; 1	NOR; 7	**MOU**; **22**	CBY; 20	**PAR**; **4**	**SGI**; **20**	X	X	**WST**; **26**	MOU; 20	**SYD**; **32**	X	**CBY**; **2**	X	**SGI**; **18**	**WAR**; **2**	**NEW**; **14**	**CRO**; **1**	WST; 20	SYD; 4	NEW; 2	**MAN**; **10**
St George Illawarra Dragons	MOU; 8	CRO; 4	NOR; 26	NEW; 20	**CRO**; **0**	SYD; 20	**WAR**; **8**	PEN; 20	X	X	WAR; 4	**NEW**; **4**	**WST**; **12**	X	MAN; 20	X	**PEN**; **18**	PAR; 32	**NOR**; **30**	**SYD**; **8**	CBY; 2	**PAR**; **18**	**MAN**; **2**	**MOU**; **4**
Sydney Roosters	**CRO**; **24**	**MOU**; **6**	**WST**; **22**	WAR; 22	**CBY**; **12**	**SGI**; **20**	MAN; 24	MOU; 30	X	X	**CRO**; **0**	CBY; 2	PEN; 32	**NEW**; **10**	PAR; 26	X	NOR; 16	**MAN**; **2**	**WAR**; **8**	SGI; 8	**PAR**; **18**	**PEN**; **4**	WST; 26	X
Warriors	NOR; 8	CBY; 18	**PEN**; **1**	**SYD**; **22**	**WST**; **16**	MAN; 20	SGI; 8	CRO; 6	X	X	**SGI**; **4**	**MAN**; **22**	**PAR**; **16**	MOU; 20	**NEW**; **48**	X	PAR; 8	PEN; 2	SYD; 8	**CBY**; **6**	X	NEW; 48	**CRO**; **12**	**NOR**; **24**
Wests Tigers	CBY; 20	**NEW**; **22**	SYD; 22	PAR; 14	WAR; 16	**NOR**; **22**	NEW; 14	**PAR**; **12**	X	X	PEN; 26	CRO; 8	SGI; 12	MAN; 5	NOR; 26	X	**MAN**; **38**	MOU; 6	**CBY**; **16**	X	**PEN**; **20**	**MOU**; **20**	**SYD**; **26**	**CRO**; **32**
Team	1	2	3	4	5	6	7	8	9	10	11	12	13	14	15	16	17	18	19	20	21	22	23	24

Bold – Opposition's Home game
X – Bye
Opponent for round listed above margin

== Ladder ==
2018 Jersey Flegg Cup
Pos	Team	Pld	W	D	L	B	PF	PA	PD	Pts
1	Newcastle Knights	20	17	0	3	4	648	348	+300	42
2	Cronulla-Sutherland Sharks	20	15	2	3	4	526	369	+157	40
3	Penrith Panthers	20	14	0	6	4	426	313	+113	36
4	Mounties	20	14	0	6	4	448	386	+62	36
5	Sydney Roosters	20	11	1	8	4	536	476	+60	31
6	Parramatta Eels	20	11	0	9	4	536	414	+122	30
7	Canterbury-Bankstown Bulldogs	20	10	0	10	4	454	348	+106	28
8	St George Illawarra Dragons	20	7	1	12	4	441	465	−24	23
9	Manly Warringah Sea Eagles	20	7	0	13	4	381	520	−139	22
10	Warriors	20	6	0	14	4	326	489	−163	20
11	North Sydney Bears	20	4	0	16	4	332	611	−279	16
12	Wests Tigers	20	2	0	18	4	240	555	−315	12

== Final series ==
Home	Score	Away	Match Information
Home	Score	Away	Date and Time	Venue
Qualifying & Elimination finals
Parramatta Eels	18 – 22	Canterbury-Bankstown Bulldogs	1 September 2018, 11:00am	Panthers Stadium
Newcastle Knights	24 – 25	Mounties	1 September 2018, 12:40pm	McDonald Jones Stadium
Cronulla-Sutherland Sharks	10 – 18	Penrith Panthers	1 September 2018, 3:15pm	Panthers Stadium
Sydney Roosters	40 – 28	St George Illawarra Dragons	2 September 2018, 3:45pm	Panthers Stadium
Semi-finals
Newcastle Knights	27 – 8	Sydney Roosters	8 September 2018, 5:15pm	Jubilee Oval
Cronulla-Sutherland Sharks	30 – 10	Canterbury-Bankstown Bulldogs	9 September 2018, 5:30pm	Jubilee Oval
Preliminary finals
Penrith Panthers	30 – 26	Newcastle Knights	15 September 2018, 3:15pm	Leichhardt Oval
Mounties	22 – 26	Cronulla-Sutherland Sharks	16 September 2018, 3:00pm	Leichhardt Oval
Grand Final
Cronulla-Sutherland Sharks	22 – 12	Penrith Panthers	23 September 2018, 12:45pm	Leichhardt Oval

Qualifying and elimination finals
1 Sept, McDonald Jones Stadium
1	Newcastle	24
4	Mounties	25
2 Sept, Panthers Stadium
5	Sydney	40
8	St George Illawarra	28
1 Sept, Panthers Stadium
6	Parramatta	18
7	Canterbury-Bankstown	22
1 Sept, Panthers Stadium
2	Cronulla-Sutherland	10
3	Penrith	18

Semi-finals
8 Sept, Jubilee Oval
Newcastle	27
Sydney	8
9 Sept, Jubilee Oval
Cronulla-Sutherland	30
Canterbury-Bankstown	10

Preliminary finals
16 Sept, Leichhardt Oval
Mounties	22
Cronulla-Sutherland	26
15 Sept, Leichhardt Oval
Penrith	30
Newcastle	26

Grand final
23 Sept, Leichhardt Oval
Cronulla-Sutherland	22
Penrith	12

== Grand Final ==
Sunday, September 23
12:45pm (local time)

Cronulla-Sutherland Sharks	22 – 12	Penrith Panthers
Tries: Harry Smith (27') 1 Isaac Lumelume (31') 1 Bronson Xerri (54') 1 Braydon Trindall (62') 1 Goals: Braydon Trindall 3 (32', 56', 63')	1st: 12 – 6; 2nd: 10 – 6 Report	Tries: 1 (17') Daine Laurie; 1 (39') John Trimboli; Goals: 2 Brendan Hands (19', 40')

Leichhardt Stadium
Referee: Cameron Paddy
Player of the Match: Braydon Trindall (Cronulla)

Team lists:

FB	1	Luke Polselli
WG	2	Chris Tupou
CE	3	Jackson Ferris
CE	4	Bronson Xerri
WG	5	Isaac Lumelume
FE	6	Jayden Millard
HB	7	Braydon Trindall
PR	8	Cruz Topai-Aveai
HK	9	Harry Smith
PR	16	Blake Manowski
SR	11	Teig Wilton (c)
SR	12	Josh Carr
LK	13	James Roumanos
Substitutes:
IC	10	Monty Raper
IC	14	Luke Jurd
IC	15	Fine Kula
IC	17	Tom Caughlan
Coach: David Howlett

FB	1	Daine Laurie
WG	2	Thomas Lofts
CE	3	Marlon Ritchie
CE	4	Stephen Crichton
WG	19	Brian Too
FE	6	Dean Blore
HB	7	Brendan Hands
PR	8	Spencer Leniu
HK	9	Meni Luke
PR	10	Mitch Revell
SR	11	Alexander Myles
SR	12	Shawn Blore
LK	13	Mitch Kenny (c)
Substitutes:
IC	14	Adam Fearnley
IC	15	John Trimboli
IC	16	Brad Gaut
IC	17	J'maine Hopgood
Coach: Ben Harden

== Player statistics ==
The following statistics are correct as of the conclusion of Round 24.

=== Leading try scorers ===
Pos	Player	Team	Tries
1	Beau Fermor	Newcastle Knights	14
2	Daine Laurie	Penrith Panthers	13
2	Bilal Maarbani	Manly Warringah Sea Eagles	13
4	Blake Clayton	Canterbury-Bankstown Bulldogs	12
4	Matt Cooper	Newcastle Knights	12
4	Jackson Ferris	Cronulla-Sutherland Sharks	12

=== Leading point scorers ===
Pos	Player	Team	T	G	FG	Pts
1	Kurtis Dark	Newcastle Knights	5	92	0	204
2	Braydon Trindall	Cronulla-Sutherland Sharks	5	70	2	162
3	Jackson Willis	St George Illawarra Dragons	8	50	1	133
4	Brandon Wakeham	Canterbury-Bankstown Bulldogs	3	51	0	114
5	Todd Sapienza	Parramatta Eels	7	42	0	112
