= Kingsgrove Colts =

Australian rugby league club, based in Kingsgrove, NSW

Club information
- Full name: Kingsgrove Colts Rugby League Football Club
- Colours: Blue; White; Red
- Founded: 1955; 71 years ago

Current details
- Ground: Beverly Hills Park
- Competition: Sydney Combined Competition, St George District Rugby League

The Kingsgrove Colts Rugby League Football Club is an Australian rugby league football club based in Kingsgrove, New South Wales formed in 1955. They are in the St George junior rugby league and currently play in the Sydney Combined Competition

== 2016 Ron Massey Cup season ==
Kingsgrove had competed in The Ron Massey Cup before but this season would prove their last in the competition. At the end of the season the club finished last on the table after 22 rounds. They won only 1 game for the entire season and lost 19 matches. In those 22 matches they conceded 1120 points and scored only 170 points. In most of the matches Kingsgrove suffered very heavy losses including back to back losses in Round 5 against Wentworthville Magpies 84-4 and then the following week against Western Suburbs Magpies 84-6. Other heavy losses were against Auburn Warriors 86-6 and against Hills District Bulls 80-6. At the end of the season, Kingsgrove announced that they would not be fielding a team for the 2017 Ron Massey Cup season.

== Notable players ==
- Michael Sorridimi (1975–82) St. George Dragons)
- Josh Mansour (2012–22) Penrith Panthers, South Sydney Rabbitohs)
- John Olive (2015–19) South Sydney Rabbitohs, Gold Coast Titans & Canterbury-Bankstown Bulldogs)
- Hame Sele (2017– St George Illawarra Dragons, Penrith Panthers & South Sydney Rabbitohs)
- Abbas Miski (2019– Manly-Warringah Sea Eagles, London Broncos, Wigan)
- Makahesi Makatoa
- Siliva Havili
- Paul Momirovski
- Izaac Tu'itupou
- Paul Alamoti

== See also ==
- List of rugby league clubs in Australia
- Rugby league in New South Wales
