= Concord-Burwood-Glebe Wolves =

Australian rugby league club based in Sydney

Glebe-Burwood Wolves

Club information
- Full name: Glebe-Burwood Wolves
- Nickname: Wolves
- Colours: Primary: Charcoal; Pink; Secondary: Dirty Red; White
- Founded: 2001; 25 years ago

Current details
- Ground: Goddard Park
- Coach: Aaron Nyke Zammit & Michael Habib
- Captain: Jackson Garlick
- Competition: Ron Massey Cup
- 2019: 10th
- Current season

The Glebe-Burwood Wolves are a rugby league club based in Concord, New South Wales. They compete in the Ron Massey Cup and also field junior sides from Under 6 to Under 17 age groups in the Balmain District Junior Rugby League. In the Ron Massey Cup, they were initially known as the Concord-Burwood-Glebe Wolves, following a merger with foundation club Glebe. Their colours are charcoal and pink and since the incorporation of foundation club Glebe into the merger in 2017, the club occasionally wears the famous dirty red and white jersey worn by Glebe from 1908 to 1929. This is the first time in 87 years that the Glebe colours have been worn in a NSWRL competition.

== History ==
The logo used in the Balmain District Junior Rugby League and in Ron Massey Cup from 2015-2016.

The club was originally founded in 2001 after a merger between Concord Rugby League club and Burwood Rugby League club. The club played under the name of Concord-Burwood United Wolves in all grades until the 2011 season. In 2011, the A-Grade side merged with the North-Ryde Hawks to form Burwood North Ryde United for the purpose of having a more competitive team. After a successful year in A-Grade, winning both the premiership and minor premiership, the merged club entered a team into the Bundaberg Red Cup for the 2012 season. They competed as Burwood North Ryde United in this competition from 2012 to 2014. In 2015, the merger disbanded and the club played in the Ron Massey Cup as a standalone club, the Concord-Burwood Wolves, for two seasons. In 2017, the Glebe rugby league side, after being absent from any competition since 1929, was merged into the club with the plans of fielding their own separate side for 2018. In 2017, the club was also announced to be in a partnership with Intrust Super Premiership NSW side North Sydney Bears as one of their pathway clubs. In the 2017 Ron Massey Cup season, Concord-Burwood-Glebe finished 7th on the table and qualified for the finals. On 3 September 2017, they played against The Auburn Warriors but were defeated 29-20 thus being eliminated from the competition. For The 2018 Ron Massey Cup season it was announced that the club had changed its name to The Glebe-Burwood Wolves

Glebe-Burwood enjoyed a good 2018 season with the club qualifying for the finals and advancing all the way to the preliminary final before being defeated 24-22 by defending premiers the Wentworthville Magpies. At the end of the 2019 Ron Massey Cup season, Glebe-Burwood finished in second last position on the table only 2 points above last placed Brothers Penrith.

Due to the Covid-19 pandemic. The Ron Massey Cup and Sydney Shield competitions were cancelled along with the Canterbury Cup NSW. As a result, Glebe entered into the temporary Presidents Cup competition. Glebe would go on to reach the grand final against the Maitland Pickers but were defeated 17-16 at Bankwest Stadium.

== Notable players ==
- Mosese Pangai (2012 North Queensland Cowboys)
- Junior Roqica (2014 Cronulla-Sutherland Sharks)
- Kyle Lovett (2015–2018) Wests Tigers, Leigh Centurions, Workington Town)
- Max Jorgensen (NSW Waratahs)
- Tony Sukkar (Wests Tigers)
- Brandon Tumeth (Wests Tigers)
- Mark Nawaqanitawase (Sydney Roosters)
- Krystian Mapapalangi (Newcastle Knights)

== Playing Record in NSWRL Competitions ==
Under different incarnations the club has entered teams in lower tier competitions run by the New South Wales Rugby League.

Year	Team	Competition	Ladder			Finals Position	All Match Record						
Year	Team	Competition	Pos	Byes	Pts	Finals Position	P	W	L	D	For	Agst	Diff
2012	Burwood North Ryde	Bundaberg Red Cup	8	0	6		18	3	15	0	400	720	-320
2013	Burwood North Ryde	Ron Massey Cup	6	0	22	Last 6 Semi-Finalist	24	12	12	0	676	616	60
2014	Burwood North Ryde	Ron Massey Cup	12	0	8		21	4	17	0	470	749	-279
2015	Concord Burwood	Ron Massey Cup	6	2	23	Top 8 Elimination Semi-Finalist	21	9	11	1	546	622	-76
2016	Concord Burwood	Ron Massey Cup	5	2	28	Top 8 Elimination Semi-Finalist	21	12	9	0	536	560	-24
2017	Concord Burwood Glebe	Ron Massey Cup	7	7	30	Top 8 Elimination Semi-Finalist	19	8	11	0	442	548	-106
2018	Glebe-Burwood	Ron Massey Cup	6	2	25	Last 4 Preliminary Finalist	21	12	8	1	586	415	171
2019	Glebe-Burwood	Ron Massey Cup	10	2	12		20	4	16	0	338	641	-303
2020	Glebe-Burwood	Ron Massey Cup	N/A	0	2	Competition Cancelled	1	1	0	0	12	4	8
2020	Glebe-Burwood	President's Cup	2	1	15								

== See also ==
- List of rugby league clubs in Australia
- Rugby league in New South Wales

== Sources ==
Years	Acronym	Item	Available Online	Via
1991–96, 1998–2009	-	New South Wales Rugby League Annual Report	No	State Library of NSW
2014–19	-	New South Wales Rugby League Annual Report	Yes	NSWRL website
2003 to 2014	RLW	Rugby League Week	Yes	eResources at State Library of NSW
1974 to 2019	BL	Big League	No	State Library of NSW
2010 to 2019	-	Various Newspaper Websites	Yes	As referenced
