= Bathurst '75 FC =

Bathurst 75
- Full name: Bathurst LXXV Football Club
- Nickname: 75s
- Founded: 1975; 51 years ago
- Ground: Proctor Park
- League: Bathurst District Football
- Website: https://www.bathurst75fc.com.au/
Home colours

Bathurst LXXV Football Club, commonly referred to as Bathurst 75, is an Australian amateur football club based in Bathurst, New South Wales. The club currently competes in Bathurst District Football junior and senior levels.

The club was founded, hence its name, in 1975, with players like Archie Thompson, Nathan Burns and Rhyan Grant having played for the club at junior and senior levels.

In the 2018 season, Bathurst 75 fielded over 320 players within 30 teams, in both juniors and seniors. Twenty non-competitive sides teams took part in the Small Sided (Grassroots - Aldi MiniRoos), alongside six junior competitive teams and four senior teams.

Bathurst 75 ceased to feature in the Australian league system at the end of the 2012 Football NSW season, after an $80,000 water bill at its old ground, Alec Lamberton Field, proved to costly, meaning the club had to move its operation to Proctor Park and Police Paddock. Western NSW Mariners FC replaced Bathurst 75 as the region's representative side.

== Honours ==
- NSW Division Three/NPL NSW 3

Premiers (2): 1979, 1983
Runners-Up (2): 1978, 1992

- NSW Division Three/NPL NSW 3 Grand Finals

Winners (2): 1979, 1992

- Western Premier League Grand Finals

Premiers (6): 1996, 1997, 1998, 2002, 2003, 2005
Runners-Up (4): 2004, 2006, 2007, 2008
