= 2020 New South Wales Rugby League season =

2020 Canterbury Cup NSW
- Duration: Cancelled
- Teams: 12
- Broadcast partners: Fox League; Nine Network

The 2020 Canterbury Cup NSW was the twelfth season of the New South Wales Cup, the top rugby league competition administered by the New South Wales Rugby League. The competition acts as a second-tier league to the ten New South Wales-based National Rugby League clubs, as well the Canberra Raiders and New Zealand Warriors. The competition will consist of 24 regular season rounds that will begin on 14 March and end on 30 August, they will be followed by 4 playoff rounds beginning on 5 September and ending with the grand final on 27 September. Newtown Jets are the defending premiers. On 27 March 2020 the New South Wales Rugby League opted to cancel the remainder of the season because of the COVID-19 pandemic.

== Teams ==
Colours	Team	Home ground(s)	Coach
	Blacktown Workers Sea Eagles	HE Laybutt Field Lottoland	Steven Hales
	Canterbury-Bankstown Bulldogs	ANZ Stadium Bankwest Stadium Belmore Sports Ground	Brad Henderson
	Mount Pritchard Mounties	Aubrey Keech Reserve GIO Stadium	Peter Marrapodi
	Newcastle Knights	McDonald Jones Stadium	Tony Gleeson
	New Zealand Warriors	Mount Smart Stadium	Justin Morgan
	Newtown Jets	Henson Park	Greg Matterson
	North Sydney Bears	North Sydney Oval	Jason Taylor
	Parramatta Eels	Bankwest Stadium Campbelltown Stadium Ringrose Park	Ryan Carr
	Penrith Panthers	Panthers Stadium	Peter Wallace
	South Sydney Rabbitohs	Metricon High Performance Centre	Ben Rogers
	St. George Illawarra Dragons	Netstrata Jubilee Stadium WIN Stadium	Mathew Head
	Western Suburbs Magpies	Campbelltown Stadium Leichhardt Oval	Wayne Collins

== Ladder ==
Pos	Team	Pld	W	D	L	PF	PA	PD	Pts
1	Newtown Jets	1	1	0	0	32	12	+20	2
2	Western Suburbs Magpies	1	1	0	0	32	12	+20	2
3	Penrith Panthers	1	1	0	0	20	6	+14	2
4	Parramatta Eels	1	1	0	0	24	16	+8	2
5	Newcastle Knights	1	1	0	0	20	16	+4	2
6	Mount Pritchard Mounties	1	1	0	0	32	30	+2	2
7	Blacktown Workers Sea Eagles	1	0	0	1	30	32	−2	0
8	New Zealand Warriors	1	0	0	1	16	20	−4	0
9	Canterbury-Bankstown Bulldogs	1	0	0	1	16	24	−8	0
10	North Sydney Bears	1	0	0	1	6	20	−14	0
11	South Sydney Rabbitohs	1	0	0	1	12	32	−20	0
12	St. George Illawarra Dragons	1	0	0	1	12	32	−20	0

Updated to match(es) played on 15 March. Source:
Rules for classification: 1) points; 2) point difference; 3) points scored

=== Ladder progression ===
- Numbers highlighted in green indicate that the team finished the round inside the top 8.
- Numbers highlighted in blue indicates the team finished first on the ladder in that round.
- Numbers highlighted in red indicates the team finished last place on the ladder in that round.
- Underlined numbers indicate that the team had a bye during that round.

Pos	Team	1	2	3	4	5	6	7	8	9	10	11	12	13	14	15	16	17	18	19	20	21	22	23	24
1	Newtown Jets	2																							
2	Western Suburbs Magpies	2																							
3	Penrith Panthers	2																							
4	Parramatta Eels	2																							
5	Newcastle Knights	2																							
6	Mount Pritchard Mounties	2																							
7	Blacktown Workers Sea Eagles	0																							
8	New Zealand Warriors	0																							
9	Canterbury-Bankstown Bulldogs	0																							
10	North Sydney Bears	0																							
11	South Sydney Rabbitohs	0																							
12	St. George Illawarra Dragons	0																							

== Round 1 ==
Home	Score	Away	Match Information
Home	Score	Away	Date and Time	Venue	Referees
Newcastle Knights	20 – 16	New Zealand Warriors	Saturday, 14 March 12:40 pm	McDonald Jones Stadium	Matt Noyen, Jake Sutherland
Penrith Panthers	20 – 6	North Sydney Bears	Saturday, 14 March 5:20 pm	Panthers Stadium	Kieren Irons, Clayton Wills
Parramatta Eels	24 – 16	Canterbury-Bankstown Bulldogs	Sunday, 15 March 1:05 pm	Campbelltown Stadium	Todd Smith, Drew Oultram
Blacktown Workers Sea Eagles	30 – 32	Mount Pritchard Mounties	Sunday, 15 March 1:55 pm	Lottoland	Darian Furner, Tom Cambourn
St. George Illawarra Dragons	12 – 32	Western Suburbs Magpies	Sunday, 15 March 3:45 pm	WIN Stadium	Martin Jones, Daniel Luttringer
South Sydney Rabbitohs	12 – 32	Newtown Jets	Sunday, 15 March 4:00 pm	Metricon High Performance Centre	Cameron Paddy, Kieren Irons

== Major NSWRL Competitions ==
=== Ron Massey Cup (2nd Grade) ===
==== Standings ====
Pos	Team	Pld	W	D	L	PF	PA	PD	Pts
1	Mount Pritchard Mounties	1	1	0	0	30	4	+26	2
2	Kaiviti Silktails	1	1	0	0	40	16	+24	2
3	St Marys Saints	1	1	0	0	44	32	+12	2
4	Glebe-Burwood Wolves	1	1	0	0	12	4	+8	2
5	Wentworthville Magpies	1	1	0	0	18	14	+4	2
6	Guildford Owls	0	0	0	0	0	0	0	2
7	Cabramatta Two Blues	1	0	0	1	14	18	−4	0
8	Hills Bulls	1	0	0	1	4	12	−8	0
9	Asquith Magpies	1	0	0	1	32	44	−12	0
10	Windsor Wolves	1	0	0	1	16	40	−24	0
11	Blacktown Workers Sea Eagles	1	0	0	1	4	30	−26	0

Updated to match(es) played on 15 March. Source:
Rules for classification: 1) points; 2) point difference; 3) points scored

=== Sydney Shield (3rd Grade) ===
==== Standings ====
Pos	Team	Pld	W	D	L	PF	PA	PD	Pts
1	East Campbelltown Eagles	1	1	0	0	59	6	+53	2
2	Ryde-Eastwood Hawks	1	1	0	0	50	8	+42	2
3	Blacktown Workers Sea Eagles	1	1	0	0	24	10	+14	2
4	Wentworthville Magpies	1	1	0	0	28	16	+12	2
5	Hills Bulls	1	1	0	0	24	20	+4	2
6	St Marys Saints	1	1	0	0	20	16	+4	2
7	Belrose Eagles	1	0	1	0	20	20	0	1
8	Guildford Owls	1	0	1	0	20	20	0	1
9	Sydney University	1	0	0	1	20	24	−4	0
10	Asquith Magpies	1	0	0	1	16	20	−4	0
11	Cabramatta Two Blues	1	0	0	1	16	28	−12	0
12	Windsor Wolves	1	0	0	1	10	24	−14	0
13	Moorebank Rams	1	0	0	1	8	50	−42	0
14	Brothers Penrith	1	0	0	1	6	59	−53	0

Updated to match(es) played on 15 March. Source:
Rules for classification: 1) points; 2) point difference; 3) points scored

=== Women's Premiership ===
==== Standings ====
Pos	Team	Pld	W	D	L	PF	PA	PD	Pts
1	Wentworthville Magpies	1	1	0	0	42	4	+38	2
2	Wests Tigers	1	1	0	0	36	4	+32	2
3	Mount Pritchard Mounties	1	1	0	0	26	0	+26	2
4	St Marys Saints	1	1	0	0	18	4	+14	2
5	Cronulla-Caringbah Sharks	1	1	0	0	16	10	+6	2
6	Canterbury-Bankstown Bulldogs	0	0	0	0	0	0	0	2
7	Central Coast Roosters	1	0	0	1	10	16	−6	0
8	South Sydney Rabbitohs	1	0	0	1	4	18	−14	0
9	North Sydney Bears	1	0	0	1	0	26	−26	0
10	Brothers Penrith	1	0	0	1	4	36	−32	0
11	Cabramatta Two Blues	1	0	0	1	4	42	−38	0

Updated to match(es) played on 15 March. Source:
Rules for classification: 1) points; 2) point difference; 3) points scored

=== Jersey Flegg Cup (Under 20s) – Cancelled ===
==== Standings ====
Pos	Team	Pld	W	D	L	PF	PA	PD	Pts
1	Penrith Panthers U20s	1	1	0	0	24	0	+24	2
2	Sydney Roosters U20s	1	1	0	0	30	16	+14	2
3	Manly Warringah Sea Eagles U20s	1	1	0	0	18	10	+8	2
4	Parramatta Eels U20s	1	1	0	0	20	14	+6	2
5	South Sydney Rabbitohs U20s	1	1	0	0	32	30	+2	2
6	St. George Illawarra Dragons U20s	1	1	0	0	16	14	+2	2
7	Canberra Raiders U20s	0	0	0	0	0	0	0	2
8	Cronulla-Sutherland Sharks U20s	1	0	0	1	30	32	−2	0
9	Wests Tigers U20s	1	0	0	1	14	16	−2	0
10	Canterbury-Bankstown Bulldogs U20s	1	0	0	1	14	20	−6	0
11	Victoria Thunderbolts U20s	1	0	0	1	10	18	−8	0
12	Newcastle Knights U20s	1	0	0	1	16	30	−14	0
13	North Sydney Bears U20s	1	0	0	1	0	24	−24	0

Updated to match(es) played on 15 March. Source:
Rules for classification: 1) points; 2) point difference; 3) points scored

== NSWRL Junior Reps ==
=== SG Ball Cup (Under 18s) – Cancelled ===
==== Standings ====
Pos	Team	Pld	W	D	L	PF	PA	PD	Pts
1	Newcastle Knights U18s	5	4	1	0	194	66	+128	11
2	Canberra Raiders U18s	5	4	0	1	148	124	+24	10
3	Penrith Panthers U18s	4	3	1	0	184	40	+144	9
4	South Sydney Rabbitohs U18s	5	3	1	1	139	80	+59	9
5	Manly Warringah Sea Eagles U18s	6	3	2	1	208	110	+98	8
6	Illawarra Steelers U18s	4	3	0	1	149	66	+83	8
7	New Zealand Warriors U18s	6	4	0	2	202	131	+71	8
8	Sydney Roosters U18s	4	3	0	1	120	64	+56	8
9	Balmain Tigers U18s	4	3	0	1	100	68	+32	8
10	Canterbury-Bankstown Bulldogs U18s	5	2	1	2	124	120	+4	7
11	Parramatta Eels U18s	6	3	0	3	182	134	+48	6
12	Victoria Thunderbolts U18s	5	2	0	3	140	148	−8	6
13	Cronulla-Sutherland Sharks U18s	5	2	0	3	94	106	−12	4
14	Western Suburbs Magpies U18s	5	1	0	4	84	186	−102	4
15	St George Dragons U18s	5	1	0	4	110	164	−54	2
16	Central Coast Roosters U18s	4	0	0	4	52	156	−104	2
17	North Sydney Bears U18s	4	0	0	4	30	190	−160	2
18	West Coast Pirates U18s	6	0	0	6	26	333	−307	0

Updated to match(es) played on 15 March. Source:
Rules for classification: 1) points; 2) point difference; 3) points scored

=== Harold Matthews Cup (Under 16s) – Cancelled ===
==== Standings ====
Pos	Team	Pld	W	D	L	PF	PA	PD	Pts
1	Canterbury-Bankstown Bulldogs U16s	5	5	0	0	170	32	+138	12
2	Parramatta Eels U16s	6	5	0	1	136	72	+64	10
3	Penrith Panthers U16s	4	4	0	0	104	44	+60	10
4	Manly Warringah Sea Eagles U16s	6	4	0	2	156	60	+96	8
5	Newcastle Knights U16s	5	3	0	2	124	94	+30	8
6	Cronulla-Sutherland Sharks U16s	5	3	0	2	132	96	+36	6
7	North Sydney Bears U16s	4	2	0	2	76	68	+8	6
8	Canberra Raiders U16s	5	2	0	3	76	94	−18	6
9	Western Suburbs Magpies U16s	5	2	0	3	74	98	−24	6
10	Balmain Tigers U16s	4	1	1	2	56	74	−18	5
11	Central Coast Roosters U16s	4	1	1	2	58	78	−20	5
12	South Sydney Rabbitohs U16s	5	1	0	4	50	158	−108	4
13	Illawarra Steelers U16s	4	0	0	4	48	98	−50	2
14	Sydney Roosters U16s	5	1	0	4	60	144	−84	2
15	St George Dragons U16s	5	1	0	4	54	164	−110	2

Updated to match(es) played on 14 March. Source:
Rules for classification: 1) points; 2) point difference; 3) points scored

=== Tarsha Gale Cup (Girls Under 18s) – Cancelled ===
==== Standings ====
Pos	Team	Pld	W	D	L	PF	PA	PD	Pts
1	Illawarra Steelers U18s Girls	5	5	0	0	156	26	+130	10
2	Cronulla-Sutherland Sharks U18s Girls	5	4	0	1	100	96	+4	8
3	St George Dragons U18s Girls	5	3	1	1	114	60	+54	7
4	Roosters Indigenous U18s Girls	5	3	0	2	90	50	+40	6
5	Canberra Raiders U18s Girls	6	3	0	3	118	96	+22	6
6	Canterbury-Bankstown Bulldogs U18s Girls	5	2	0	3	76	78	−2	4
7	Wests Tigers U18s Girls	5	2	0	3	58	132	−74	4
8	Parramatta Eels U18s Girls	6	1	1	4	58	118	−60	3
9	Newcastle Knights U18s Girls	5	1	0	4	54	108	−54	2
10	Penrith Panthers U18s Girls	5	1	0	4	56	116	−60	2

Updated to match(es) played on 14 March. Source:
Rules for classification: 1) points; 2) point difference; 3) points scored

== NSWRL Country Championships ==
=== Men's Country Championships (Under 23s) – Cancelled ===
==== Northern Group Standings ====
Pos	Team	Pld	W	D	L	PF	PA	PD	Pts
1	Northern Rivers Titans U23s	2	2	0	0	66	16	+50	4
2	Newcastle-Hunter U23s	2	2	0	0	50	36	+14	4
3	Central Coast Roosters U23s	2	0	0	2	30	48	−18	0
4	North Coast Bulldogs U23s	2	0	0	2	26	62	−36	0
5	Greater Northern Tigers U23s	2	0	0	2	12	58	−46	0

Updated to match(es) played on 15 March. Source:
Rules for classification: 1) points; 2) point difference; 3) points scored

==== Southern Group Standings ====
Pos	Team	Pld	W	D	L	PF	PA	PD	Pts
1	Monaro Colts U23s	2	2	0	0	72	16	+56	4
2	Illawarra South Coast Dragons U23s	2	2	0	0	76	22	+54	4
3	Western Rams U23s	2	1	0	1	54	46	+8	2
4	GSR Wests Tigers U23s	2	1	0	1	42	38	+4	2
5	Riverina Bulls U23s	2	0	0	2	6	92	−86	0

Updated to match(es) played on 15 March. Source:
Rules for classification: 1) points; 2) point difference; 3) points scored

=== Women's Country Championships – Cancelled ===
==== Northern Group standings ====
Pos	Team	Pld	W	D	L	PF	PA	PD	Pts
1	Greater Northern Tigers	2	2	0	0	44	12	+32	4
2	Newcastle-Hunter	2	1	1	0	30	16	+14	3
3	North Coast Bulldogs	1	0	1	0	16	16	0	1
4	Central Coast Roosters	2	0	0	2	0	28	−28	0
5	Northern Rivers Titans	1	0	0	1	4	34	−30	0

Updated to match(es) played on 15 March. Source:
Rules for classification: 1) points; 2) point difference; 3) points scored

==== Southern Group Standings ====
Pos	Team	Pld	W	D	L	PF	PA	PD	Pts
1	Monaro Colts	2	2	0	0	28	8	+20	4
2	Illawarra South Coast Dragons	2	1	0	1	50	26	+24	2
3	GSR Wests Tigers	2	1	0	1	26	24	+2	2
4	Western Rams	2	1	0	1	32	34	−2	2
5	Riverina Bulls	2	0	0	2	16	48	−32	0

Updated to match(es) played on 15 March. Source:
Rules for classification: 1) points; 2) point difference; 3) points scored

=== Laurie Daley Cup (Under 18s) – Cancelled ===
==== Northern Group standings ====
Pos	Team	Pld	W	D	L	PF	PA	PD	Pts
1	North Coast Bulldogs U18s	5	3	1	1	154	110	+44	7
2	Greater Northern Tigers U18s	5	3	1	1	124	98	+26	7
3	Northern Rivers Titans U18s	4	2	2	0	140	76	+64	6
4	Newcastle Knights U18s	5	2	0	3	112	158	−46	4
5	Parramatta Eels U18s	4	1	0	3	69	108	−39	2
6	Central Coast Roosters U18s	5	1	0	4	82	131	−49	2

Updated to match(es) played on 15 March. Source:
Rules for classification: 1) points; 2) point difference; 3) points scored

==== Southern Group Standings ====
Pos	Team	Pld	W	D	L	PF	PA	PD	Pts
1	Western Rams U18s	5	4	0	1	128	92	+36	8
2	Illawarra-South Coast Dragons U18s	5	3	0	2	134	94	+40	6
3	Riverina Bulls U18s	5	3	0	2	156	132	+24	6
4	Monaro Colts U18s	5	2	1	2	128	152	−24	5
5	Penrith Panthers U18s	5	1	1	3	108	122	−14	3
6	GSR Wests Tigers U18s	5	1	0	4	86	148	−62	2

Updated to match(es) played on 15 March. Source:
Rules for classification: 1) points; 2) point difference; 3) points scored

=== Andrew Johns Cup (Under 16s) – Cancelled ===
==== Northern Group standings ====
Pos	Team	Pld	W	D	L	PF	PA	PD	Pts
1	Parramatta Eels U16s	4	3	1	0	112	46	+66	7
2	North Coast Bulldogs U16s	5	3	0	2	120	74	+46	6
3	Northern Rivers Titans U16s	4	3	0	1	92	68	+24	6
4	Newcastle Knights U16s	5	2	1	2	90	94	−4	5
5	Central Coast Roosters U16s	5	1	0	4	58	112	−54	2
6	Greater Northern Tigers U16s	5	1	0	4	56	134	−78	2

Updated to match(es) played on 15 March. Source:
Rules for classification: 1) points; 2) point difference; 3) points scored

==== Southern Group Standings ====
Pos	Team	Pld	W	D	L	PF	PA	PD	Pts
1	Penrith Panthers U16s	5	4	0	1	134	68	+66	8
2	Western Rams U16s	5	4	0	1	110	72	+38	8
3	Riverina Bulls U16s	5	3	0	2	82	104	−22	6
4	GSR Wests Tigers U16s	5	2	1	2	84	88	−4	5
5	Illawarra-South Coast Dragons U16s	5	1	1	3	76	116	−40	3
6	Monaro Colts U16s	5	0	0	5	68	106	−38	0

Updated to match(es) played on 15 March. Source:
Rules for classification: 1) points; 2) point difference; 3) points scored
