= Dubbo CYMS =

Australian rugby league club, based in Dubbo, NSW

Club information
- Full name: Dubbo CYMSs Rugby League Football Club
- Nickname: Fishies
- Colours: Green; White
- Founded: 1947; 79 years ago
- Website: Official website

Current details
- Ground: Apex Oval, Dubbo
- Competition: Western Premiership
- 2025: 1st
- Current season

Records
- Premierships: 12 (1969, 1971, 1975, 1986, 2001, 2002-03-04, 2007-09, 2011, 2014)

The Dubbo CYMS are an Australian rugby league football team based in Dubbo, New South Wales a city in the Orana Region of New South Wales, Australia and play in the Western Premiership. The team was founded in 1947 before joining the group XI competition eleven years later.

== Notable Juniors ==
- Isaah Yeo (2014- Penrith Panthers)
- Kaide Ellis (2018- Penrith Panthers, St George Illawarra Dragons and Wigan Warriors)
- Matt Burton (2019- Penrith Panthers & Canterbury Bulldogs)

== See also ==
- List of rugby league clubs in Australia
