= Macquarie Scorpions =

Australian rugby league club, based in Toronto, NSW

Club information
- Full name: Macquarie Scorpions Rugby League Football Club
- Colours: Green; Gold
- Founded: 1954; 72 years ago

Current details
- Ground: Lyall Peacock Field, Toronto
- Competition: Newcastle Rugby League

Records
- Premierships: 2 (1991, 2017)
- Runners-up: 3 (1994, 2015, 2016)
- Minor premierships: 1 (2016)

The Macquarie Scorpions is an Australian rugby league football club based in Toronto, New South Wales formed in 1954 as Toronto Workers. They currently play in the Newcastle Rugby League competition

== Club history ==
When Toronto was a sparsely populated outpost of the Lake Macquarie district, rugby league in the area was a rough and ready affair. So much so that after a match at the Sports Ground (now Lyall Peacock Field) the referee was thrown into the adjacent creek and the club was banished from the competition.

Later, a rugby union team was formed playing in white jerseys with a red and blue V, then red and blue jerseys.

Bob Hume, who had a league background at Kurri Kurri, arrived to work at Awaba State Mine in 1952 and inspired a long campaign to establish the code on a firm footing in the Toronto area.

Firstly, a team played in red and blue colours in the Newcastle third grade competition, with under 16's and under 18's formed in 1953.

Early in 1954, the Toronto club applied and was accepted into the Central Coast competition.

To avoid a clash with the Gosford club's red and blue colours, it was decided that Toronto would play in green and gold, the colours of Toronto Public School.

In the first of its six years in competition, Toronto fielded teams in first, reserve and under 19 grades.

The under 19's, captained by Johnny Shields and coached by Mike Conway, won the premiership.

In 1956, Toronto under captain/coach George "Caesar" Hain, upset hot favourites Woy Woy in the reserve grade decider.

As the 1950s ended, the efforts of Hume and his allies were at last rewarded with the Toronto club – by a slim 5–4 majority vote of the existing clubs – were accepted into the Newcastle premiership for the 1960 season.

Former Newcastle Northern Suburbs and subsequent Kangaroo forward Arthur Collinson, was signed from Wauchope to be Toronto's first captain/coach for the 1960–61 seasons.

Following is a diary of landmark events for the club over the past half century:

1959 – 14 December:

Approval in principle for Toronto United to become part of the Newcastle premiership.

1960 – 4 February:

Approval ratified by the NRL annual meeting.

1963:

Name changed to Macquarie United.

1964 – 9 August

Macquarie's first win in all grades on the one day v Waratah – Mayfield (20–12 First grade, 28–4 Reserve grade, 10–2 Third grade).

1967 – 12 June:

First competition win in final of the Caltex $1000 knockout, 22–5 against Central Newcastle.

1967:

First grade team in semi finals for the first time. Defeated Lakes United 18–9, then lost preliminary final 8–4 to Northern Suburbs, the subsequent grand final winner.

1968:

Semi final qualifier for second successive year. Lost 12–9 to South Newcastle, the eventual grand final winner.

1970

John Bainbridge became the first Scorpion to play 200 first grade games.

1974:

Third time in semi finals. Defeated Kurri Kurri 19–5, then lost 20–13 to Western Suburbs in preliminary final.

1974:

Reserve grade team brought club its first premiership. Defeated Central Charlestown 20–5 in minor semi final, Maitland 23–15 in preliminary final and Western Suburbs 19–14 in grand final.

1978:

Gained highest placing – second – in any premiership campaign to that point. Lost major semi final 29–0 to Western Suburbs, the eventual premier, and lost preliminary final 21–7 to south Newcastle.

1981

Finished in top five, then lost 25–15 to Maitland in elimination semi final.

1985:

Peter “Zac” Alexander breaks John Bainbridge's record as highest amount of first grade games. These two players remain the only 2 to play over 200 first grade games for Macquarie.

1991:

Mal Graham signs on as the Scorpions' captain/coach. In his first season, the Scorpions reach their maiden First grade final. They played under the name of Toronto Workers Scorpions for 7 seasons.

1991:

Won First grade grand final beating Western Suburbs 21–10. Earlier lost qualifying semi final 32–16 to Wests, then beat Lakes United 42–12 in minor semi final and defeated South Newcastle 34–14 in preliminary final.

1992:

Macquarie (Toronto Workers) the defending premiers fail to reach the semi-final.

1994:

The Scorpions reach their 2nd First grade grand final. This time defeating Wests in the major semi final to go directly into the grand final. They went down to Kurri Kurri 20–16.

2005

Both 1st and Reserve Grade made semi finals after some lean years. Scorpions were defeated by Nelson Bay in 1st semi final and they went onto win the GF.

2006:

First grade make semi finals only to lose both games.

2007:

Reserves reach the semi-finals defeating Wests in the grand final to bring home the club's 3rd premiership.

2008:

Mal Graham returns to the club as head coach. Macquarie have a tremendous season reaching the semi-finals in all three grades. The First grade defeated Wyong in the elimination semi before going down to Central in the minor semi. The two lower grades however went on to bring home the Premierships. To make the victories even sweeter, they defeated Western Suburbs in both games.

2009:

The team started the season with three straight wins but after that had back-to-back losses.

2012

Scorpions made semi finals in First grade under Noel Dent.

2013

Scorpions made semi finals again in First grade under Noel Dent and Barrie Moore's reserve grade side. Won the GF against Western Suburbs.

2014

Scorpions made the semi-finals in First grade but again failed to win a semi final game

2015

Scorpions made the grand final in first grade against Lakes but went down 24–18. Under 19s, Open grade and Reserve Grade all finished last in their competitions and the Scorpions ran last in club championship for the first time in many years.

2016

Scorpions made grand final against South Newcastle in First grade but were again defeated grand finalists. Reserve grade and Open Grade also made the semi-finals.

2017

A year for the Scorpions establishing themselves as the premier club in the NSW CRL winning the Mudgee 9s tournament and the inaugural NSW Challenge Cup against the sides from Newcastle, Illawarra and Ron Massey Cup. The Scorpions also took out their 2nd premiership defeating Western Suburbs 24–6. The Under 19s and Reserve Grade also made the semi-finals.

== Golden Jubilee Team ==
    1 David Hill
    2 Ken Ryan
    3 Phil Carey
    4 Jeff Shields
    5 Brian Moore
    6 Neville Elwin
    7 Bernie Landi
    8 John Bainbridge
    9 Zac Alexander
   10 Mal Graham
   11 Peter Jaques
   12 John Mitchell
   13 Keith Graham
   14 Cyril Buchanan
   15 David Riding
   16 Lamy Forbes
   17 Wally Crawford
   18 Wiremu Mason
   Coach Mal Graham
