= Apex Oval =

Sports ground of Dubbo, Australia

Caltex Park
- Location within New South Wales Location within Australia
- Former names: Apex Oval
- Location: Cobra Street, Dubbo, New South Wales
- Coordinates: 32°15′13″S 148°37′20″E
- Capacity: 11,500 (1,340 seated)
- Surface: Grass
- Record attendance: 11,423 (City vs Country 2006)

Construction
- Opened: 2005

Tenants
- Dubbo CYMS (Group 11 Rugby League); Macquarie Raiders (Group 11 Rugby League); New South Wales Country Eagles (NRC) (2014); South Sydney Rabbitohs (NRL)

Apex Oval, also known as Caltex Park, is a sports ground located in the city of Dubbo, New South Wales, Australia. The ground is managed by the Dubbo City Council and is located within the East Dubbo Sporting Complex.

Opened in 2005, the Bruce Neads Memorial Grandstand has spectator seating for 1,340, as well as function rooms and other facilities. The ground has lighting and a capacity of around 11,500. As well as local sports, it has also played host to pre-season NRL games and the City vs Country Origin rugby league game in 2006. The City vs Country game was a huge success, achieving a record attendance of over 11,423 people. An impressive feat considering Dubbo has a population of around 40,000.

The ground is home for the Dubbo CYMS Group 11 rugby league team. It is also one of the home grounds for the NSW Country Eagles team that plays in the National Rugby Championship.

In October 2020, the South Sydney Rabbitohs announced that they will be taking a home game once a year for two years to Apex Oval.
