= Steve Mavin =

Australian rugby league footballer

Personal information
- Full name: Stephen Mavin
- Born: 11 January 1968 (age 58) Sydney, New South Wales, Australia

Playing information
- Position: Centre, Wing
Club
Years	Team	Pld	T	G	FG	P
1987–90	South Sydney	88	24	0	0	96
1991	Canterbury Bulldogs	12	3	0	0	12
1992	South Sydney	1	0	0	0	0
	Total	101	27	0	0	108

Steve Mavin (/meɪvən/) (born 11 January 1968) is an Australian former professional rugby league footballer. He played for the South Sydney Rabbitohs from 1987 until 1990. Mavin played in England for Trafford Borough in 1990, the Canterbury Bankstown Bulldogs in 1991 and then returned to the Rabbitohs in 1992.

== Background ==
Mavin was born in Sydney, is of English descent, and grew up in Botany, New South Wales. He played his junior football for the Botany Rams and Alexandria Rovers in the South Sydney Juniors before being graded by South Sydney in 1986.

== Playing career ==
Mavin (nickname Mavo) played a total of 101 first grade games which included 89 for the South Sydney Rabbitohs(first grade player #757) and 12 for the Canterbury Bankstown Bulldogs (first grade player #564). Mavin made his debut with the South Sydney club as a 19-year-old on 27 February 1987 and scored his first try in round 4 when he crossed for a double against the Penrith Panthers at Redfern Oval. Mavin played in every game of the 1987 NSWRL season and scored a total of 27 tries during his career.

Mavin is remembered for his performance in the 1987 sudden death semi final against the Canberra Raiders when he made a number of errors that led to him being replaced in the first half of the game before South Sydney were eliminated from the competition 46–12. In 2017, it was revealed that Mavin left the ground at half-time after being substituted and watched the second half from the Cauliflower Hotel in Waterloo.

Mavin later said of the game "A bit later, Ian Roberts and David Boyle came to get me. They said the team function was at Maroubra Junction and that I should come along. I was like, 'Ah … what can I do?’ But I went along and it was OK. Wally Lewis was there. He sort of gave me the thumbs up. But mate I was pretty inconsolable".

Mavin would spend three more years with Souths including the 1989 season when he played in every game and the South Sydney club were minor premiers. He then played the 1990 off-season with English club Trafford Borough and one year with Canterbury in 1991. He returned to Souths in 1992 and broke his leg in Round 1 against the Parramatta Eels. Mavin was later released by Souths and trialled with the Newcastle Knights and St George Dragons but decided to retire at the age of 25. Mavin was a big and fast flamboyant centre/winger who was also well known for his swan dive tries. One of Mavins' tries was shown in the much publicized first Tina Turner rugby league advertisement in 1988 in which she sang the song What You Get Is What You See.

In 2008 Mavin was named in the Alexandria Rovers "60 Year Best of Team".

== Personal life ==
Since 2006, Mavin has worked as a Stevedore (Wharfie) on the Port Botany waterfront. In 2019 Mavin began co-hosting Rabbitohs Radio, a weekly rugby league podcast covering the South Sydney Rabbitohs. Since 2023 Mavin has been hosting Bunnies TV.
