= Coogee Dolphins =

Australian rugby league club, based in Sydney NSW

Club information
- Full name: Coogee Dolphins Rugby League Football Club
- Nickname: dolphins
- Founded: 1993; 33 years ago

Current details
- Ground: Coogee Oval
- Competition: Sydney Combined Competition, South Sydney District Junior Rugby Football League

Records
- Premierships: (2007–2008) (2019 U17 Silver Division)

The Coogee Dolphins was formed in October 1993 under the auspices of the Eastern Suburbs Junior League but now affiliated with the South Sydney District Junior Rugby Football League. The club's colours are gold and blue. Coogee Dolphins also compete for the Remembrance Cup to honour six Coogee Dolphins players who were killed in the Bali Bombings in 2002

== See also ==
- List of rugby league clubs in Australia
- List of senior rugby league clubs in New South Wales
