= La Perouse United =

Australian rugby league football club, based in La Perouse, NSW

La Perouse United RLFC
Club information
- Full name: La Perouse United; Rugby League; Football Club
- Nickname: La Pa
- Colours: Black; White
- Founded: 1968; 57 years ago

Current details
- Ground: Yarra Oval, La Perouse
- Competition: Sydney Combined Competition, South Sydney District Junior Rugby Football League

Records
- Premierships: 2008

The La Perouse United are an Australian rugby league football team based in La Perouse, New South Wales a suburb of south-central Sydney they play in the South Sydney District Junior Rugby Football League.

== Notable Juniors ==
- Chick Donnelley (1946–47 St George Dragons)
- Eric Simms (1965–75 South Sydney Rabbitohs
- Russell Fairfax (1974–81 Sydney Roosters & South Sydney Rabbitohs)
- Nathan Gibbs (1978–84 South Sydney Rabbitohs & Parramatta Eels)
- Sean Garlick (1990–99 South Sydney Rabbitohs & Sydney Roosters)
- Tom Jensen (1993–95) La Perouse & Matraville Tigers & South Eastern Seagulls
- Gavin Lester (1998–2004 Canterbury Bulldogs & Sydney Roosters)
- Reni Maitua (2004–14 Canterbury Bulldogs, Cronulla Sharks & Parramatta Eels)
- Nathan Merritt (2002–14 South Sydney Rabbitohs, Cronulla Sharks)
- Beau Champion (2005–15 South Sydney Rabbitohs, Melbourne Storm, Gold Coast Titans & Parramatta Eels)
- Fred Briggs (2007–08 Canterbury Bulldogs)
- Dylan Farrell (2010– South Sydney Rabbitohs & St George Illawarra Dragons)
- James Roberts (2011– South Sydney Rabbitohs, Penrith Panthers, Gold Coast Titans & Brisbane Broncos)
- Nathan Peats (2011– South Sydney Rabbitohs, Parramatta Eels & Gold Coast Titans)
- Adam Reynolds (2012– South Sydney Rabbitohs)
- Craig Garvey (2013– St George Illawarra Dragons & Canterbury Bulldogs)
- Alex Johnston (2014– South Sydney Rabbitohs)
- Tyrone Phillips (2015– Canterbury Bulldogs & Penrith Panthers)
- Josh Addo-Carr (2016– Wests Tigers & Melbourne Storm)
- Grant Garvey (2016– Sydney Roosters)
- Tom Wright (2018– Manly Sea Eagles)

== See also ==
- NSW Koori Knockout
