= Fred Briggs =

Fred Briggs may refer to:

- Fred Briggs (rugby league) (born 1980), Australian rugby league player
- Fred Briggs (footballer) (1908–1985), English footballer
