= Malcolm Alker =

England international rugby league footballer (1978–2024)

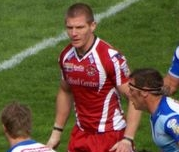
- Alker in 2009

Personal information
- Full name: Malcolm Alker
- Born: 4 November 1978 Wigan, Greater Manchester, England
- Died: 14 January 2024 (aged 45)

Playing information
- Height: 6 ft 1 in (1.85 m)
- Weight: 13 st 8 lb (86 kg)
- Position: Hooker
Club
| Years | Team | Pld | T | G | FG | P |
|---|---|---|---|---|---|---|
| 1997–2010 | Salford City Reds | 360 | 75 | 0 | 1 | 301 |
Representative
| Years | Team | Pld | T | G | FG | P |
| 2002 | Lancashire | 1 | 0 | 0 | 0 | 0 |
| 2005 | England | 2 | 0 | 0 | 0 | 0 |

Malcolm Alker (4 November 1978 – 14 January 2024) was an English professional rugby league footballer who played as a hooker. He spent his entire professional career with the Salford City Reds, making over 350 appearances between 1997 and 2010. He also served as the club's captain for many years.

== Background ==
Malcolm Alker was born in Wigan, Greater Manchester, England.

== Career ==
Alker started his junior career with Orrell St James before moving to Wigan St Patricks. He joined Salford in November 1995, and he made his first team début in 1997 against the Sheffield Eagles.

In 2000, Alker captained Salford City Reds for the first time at the age of 21 in the absence of regular captain Darren Brown.

Alker played his entire professional rugby league career at Salford City Reds. He represented Lancashire in 2002, and was capped twice by England in 2005.

Alker reached his testimonial year with Salford City Reds in 2006. His testimonial match took place during the 2007 pre-season against the Wigan Warriors, which the Warriors won 20–15.

In January 2009, Alker was stripped of the club captaincy following a breach of club rules during their pre-season training camp in Jacksonville, Florida. He was re-appointed captain two months later.

In August 2010, Alker announced that he would be retiring at the end of the season, but would remain at the club in a coaching role.

In March 2011, it was announced that head coach Shaun McRae would be taking sick leave, with Alker jointly taking charge of coaching duties alongside fellow assistant Phil Veivers and Director of Football Steve Simms during his absence. In April 2011, Alker filed a complaint against Salford after being dismissed from a training session. After failing to come to an agreement, the club announced that Alker would be "taking time away from the club to undergo surgery on his neck".

== Personal life ==
In 2012, Alker released his autobiography, The Devil Within. In the book, Alker admitted use of cocaine and banned growth hormones during his playing days.

Alker was sentenced to four years imprisonment on 12 January 2018 for the armed robbery of a KFC restaurant and a Tesco Express store in Wigan on 31 October 2017.

Alker died on 14 January 2024 from multiple organ failure at the age of 45.
