= Bondi United =

Australian rugby league club based in Bondi, NSW

Club information
- Full name: Bondi United Rugby League Football Club
- Founded: 1946

Current details
- Ground: Waverley Oval
- Competition: South Sydney District Junior Rugby Football League, Sydney Combined Competition

The Bondi United Rugby League Football Club was formed in 1946 and is an Australian rugby league football club based in Bondi, New South Wales. The club is affiliated with the Sydney Roosters Juniors but they play in the South Sydney District Junior Rugby Football League.

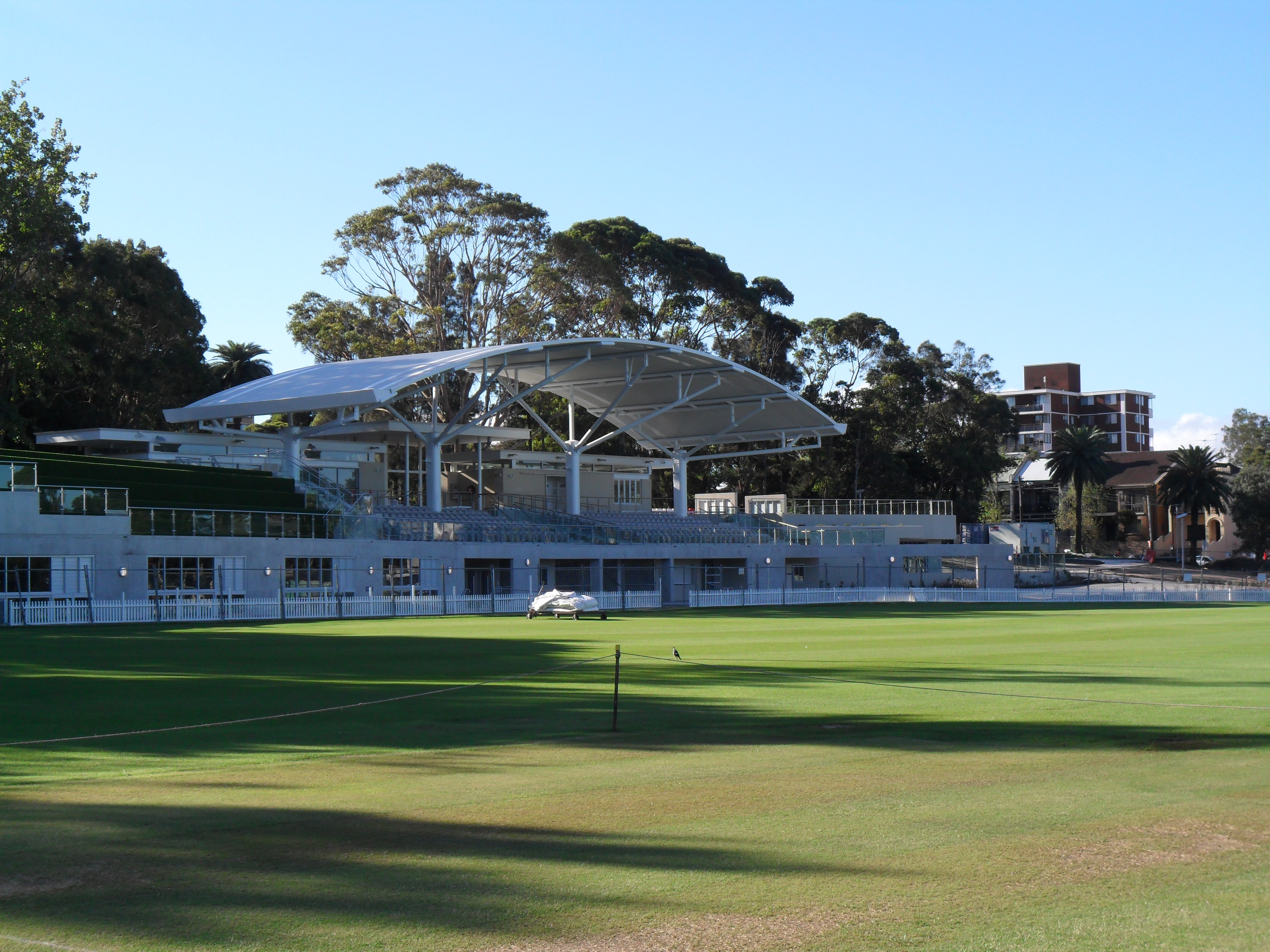
Waverley Oval

== Notable players ==
- Ferris Ashton
- Paul Dunn
- Luke Ricketson
- Matthew Elliott
- Luke Towers
- Tom Symonds
- Ian Rubin
- John Peard
- Johnny Mayes
- Kevin Junee
- Todd Ollivier
- Paul Dunn (moved from Bathurst as a teen)
- Ray Beaven

== See also ==
- Sydney Roosters Juniors
- List of rugby league clubs in Australia
