= Jim Dymock =

Australia & Tonga international rugby league footballer and coach

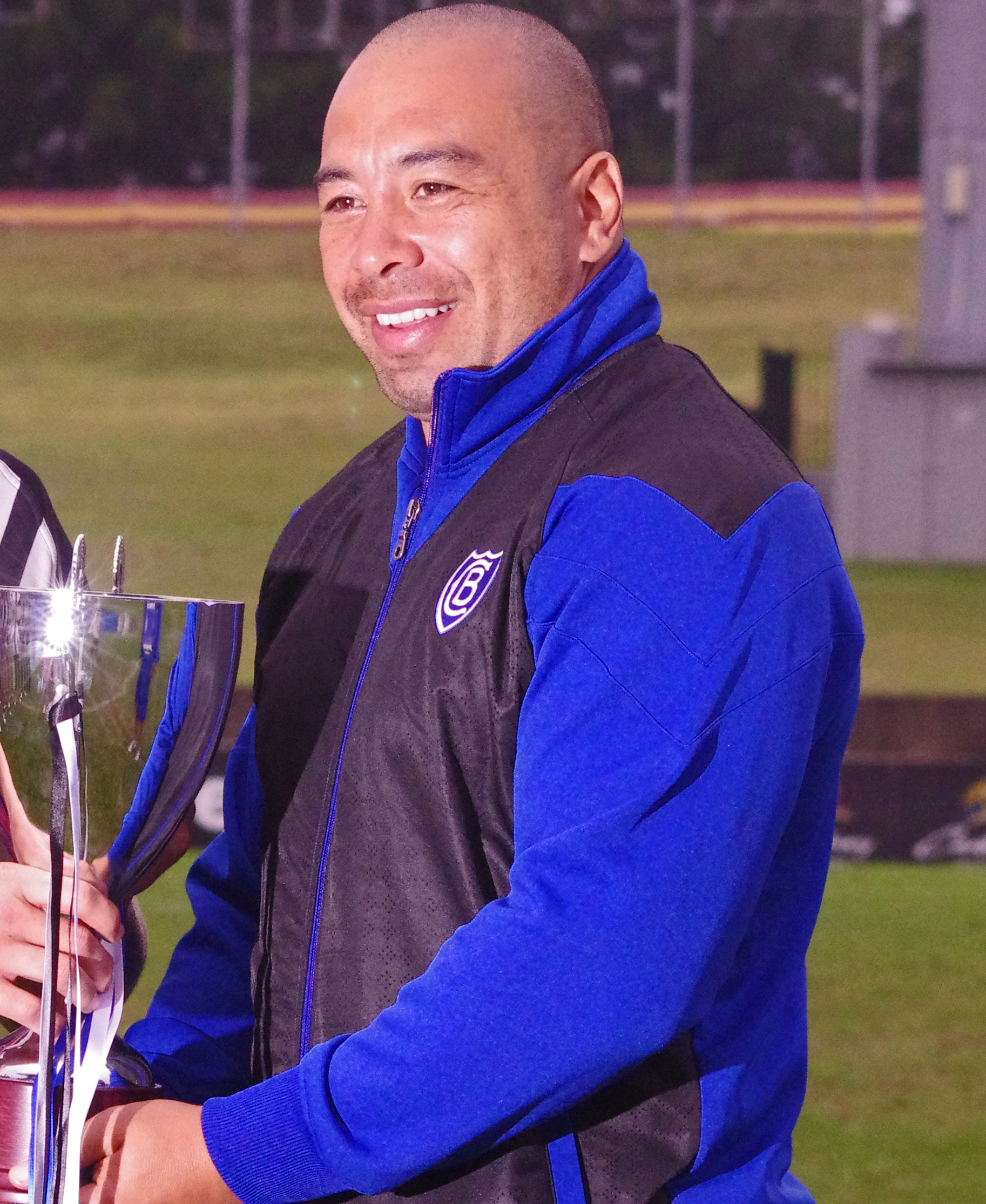

Personal information
- Full name: James Dymock
- Born: 4 April 1972 (age 54) Sydney, New South Wales, Australia

Playing information
- Height: 179 cm (5 ft 10 in)
- Weight: 93 kg (14 st 9 lb)
- Position: Lock, Five-eighth
Club
Years	Team	Pld	T	G	FG	P
1991–92	Western Suburbs	31	8	0	0	32
1993–95	Canterbury Bulldogs	71	12	0	0	48
1996–00	Parramatta Eels	112	12	0	1	49
2001–04	London Broncos	95	15	0	1	61
	Total	309	47	0	2	190
Representative
Years	Team	Pld	T	G	FG	P
1993–97	City NSW	3	0	0	0	0
1994–95	Tonga	2	0	0	0	0
1995–96	Australia	6	0	0	0	0
1996–98	New South Wales	6	1	0	0	4

Coaching information
Club
Years	Team	Gms	W	D	L	W%
2011	Canterbury Bulldogs	8	5	0	3	63
Representative
Years	Team	Gms	W	D	L	W%
2006–08	Tonga	8	4	0	4	50

Jim Dymock (born 4 April 1972) is a professional rugby league coach who is the assistant coach of the Manly Sea Eagles in the National Rugby League (NRL) and a former professional rugby league footballer who played in the 1990s and 2000s.

A Tonga and Australia international, and New South Wales State of Origin representative five-eighth or lock, he played club football for Sydney's Western Suburbs Magpies, Canterbury-Bankstown Bulldogs and the Parramatta Eels, finishing his career in the Super League for the London Broncos.

He then embarked on a coaching career, becoming head coach of the Tongan national team. He spent the latter part of the 2011 NRL season as head coach of the Canterbury-Bankstown Bulldogs, and has been an assistant coach at the Sydney Roosters, Canterbury-Bankstown Bulldogs and the Cronulla-Sutherland Sharks in the NRL.

== Background ==
Dymock was born in Sydney, New South Wales, Australia on 4 April 1972. He is of Tongan descent.

He began playing rugby league as an Eastern Suburbs junior with Paddington Colts and then Woolloomooloo Warriors. He then switched to the South Sydney juniors competition. He played for Zetland Magpies alongside players such as Jim Serdaris and Terry Hill who went on to make First Grade also.

== Playing career ==
=== Club career ===
==== Early career ====
He represented South Sydney in their S.G. Ball and Jersey Flegg teams.

==== Western Suburbs Magpies ====
Dymock began his first-grade club career in the 1991 NSWRL season at the Western Suburbs Magpies, opposing Wally Lewis and scoring two tries in his debut. He played 31 times for the club, but was "glad to go" after troubles with his manager while at Wests.

==== Canterbury-Bankstown Bulldogs ====
In 1993, Dymock joined the Canterbury-Bankstown Bulldogs.

During the 1995 season, Dymock, along with Dean Pay, Jason Smith and Jarrod McCracken reneged on their Australian Super League contracts, giving 'unfair inducement' as their reason which was later supported in the courts. Although Dymock chose to sign with the Australian Rugby League (ARL) competition, he remained with the Canterbury club for the 1995 season and contributed to the club's grand final win over Manly. Dymock won the Clive Churchill Medal for man-of-the-match.

==== Parrmatta Eels ====
Dymock joined the ARL-aligned Parramatta for the start of the 1996 season.

Dymock was selected to represent New South Wales as an interchange for all three games of the 1996 State of Origin series.

He played for the Eels during the rest of the Super League war and the unification of the Super League and ARL into the current National Rugby League competition.

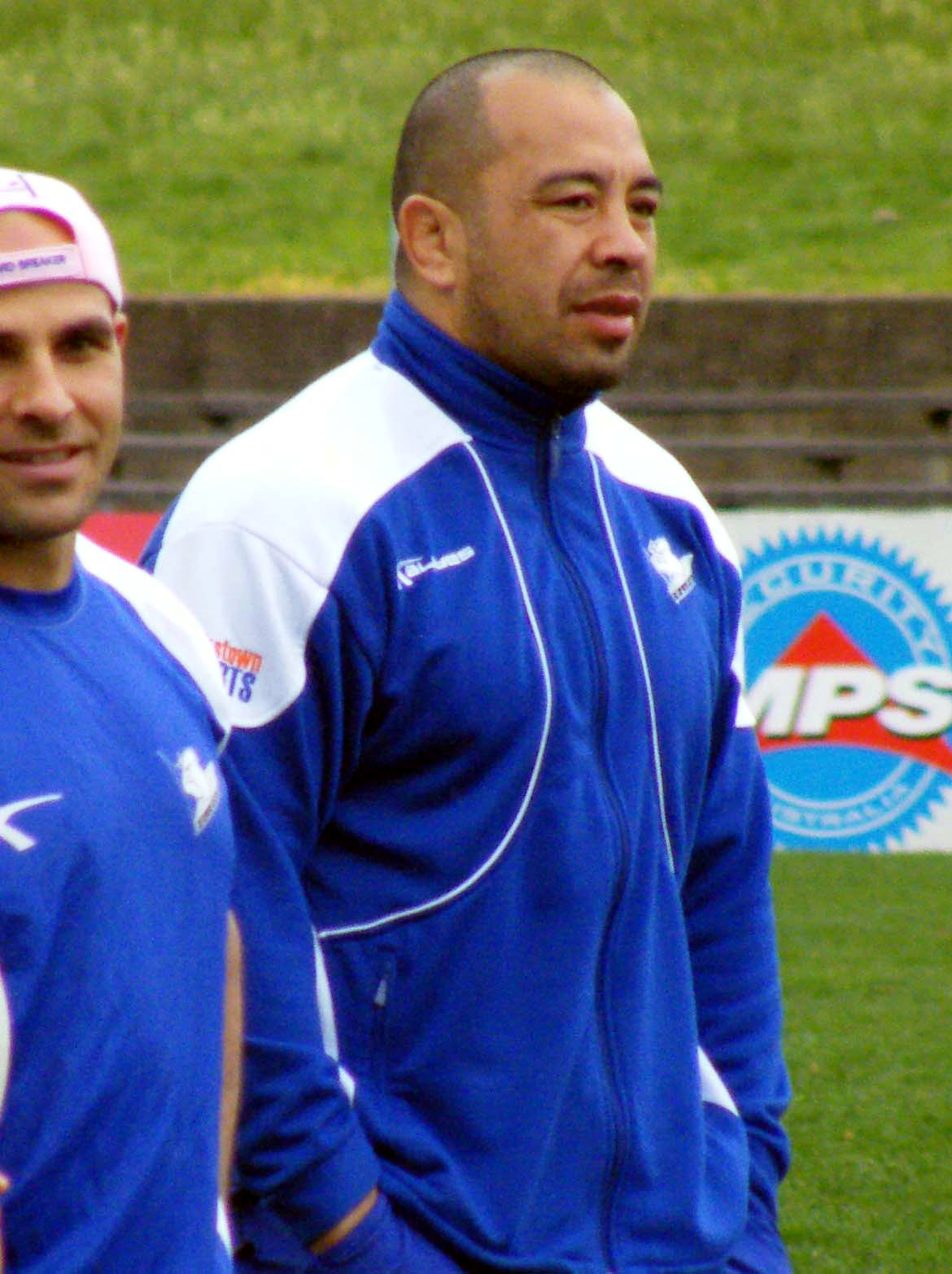
Dymock as part of the coaching staff at a Bulldogs training session in 2009

In 1997, he was selected at five-eighth for games I and II of the 1997 State of Origin series, scoring a try in game II, and he was chosen to play at lock in game III of the 1998 State of Origin series.

He played 112 games for Parramatta between 1996 and 2000, leaving the Eels and Australia at the end of 2000 season

==== London Broncos ====
He joined English Super League club London Broncos in time for the 2001 season.

He enjoyed 4 seasons at the Broncos. He ended his playing career at the end of the 2004 season after playing 95 games for London.

=== International career ===
==== Tonga ====
Dymock represented Tonga at the 1994 Pacific Cup and in 1995.

==== Australia ====
Dymock also played six times between 1995 and 1996 for Australia. He was part of the successful Australian squad that won the 1995 Rugby League World Cup in England.

== Coaching career ==
Dymock assisted head coach Ricky Stuart at the Cronulla-Sutherland Sharks.

He later returned to the Canterbury-Bankstown Bulldogs.

Dymock was also the head coach of the Tongan national rugby league team that played in the 2008 Rugby League World Cup.

On 14 July 2011, Jim Dymock was announced as the Canterbury club's new head coach, after Kevin Moore stood down from the position. However, on 14 November 2011, Dymock was replaced by Des Hasler.

== Sources ==
- Whiticker, Alan; Hudson, Glen (2007). The Encyclopedia of Rugby League Players. Wetherill Park, New South Wales: Gary Allen Pty Ltd. p. 609. ISBN 978-1-877082-93-1.
