= Luke Isakka =

Australian rugby league footballer

Personal information
- Full name: Luke David Isakka
- Born: 1 November 1980 (age 45) Sydney, New South Wales, Australia
- Height: 183 cm (6 ft 0 in)
- Weight: 92 kg (14 st 7 lb)

Playing information
- Position: Lock
Club
Years	Team	Pld	T	G	FG	P
2001–02	Wests Tigers	8	0	0	0	0
2004	Leigh	2	0	0	0	0
2011–12	Whitehaven	43	3	0	0	12
	Total	53	3	0	0	12

Luke Isakka (born 1 November 1980 in Sydney, New South Wales) is an Australian former professional rugby league footballer who played in the 2000s and 2010s. Isakka played junior rugby league for Mascot Jets. He previously played for the Wests Tigers in the National Rugby League competition in Australia. Isakka primarily played at lock-forward.

He also had a short spell in England in 2004 with Leigh in National League One.

In January 2011, Isakka joined Championship One club Whitehaven.
