= Zetland Magpies =

Club information
- Full name: Zetland Magpies Rugby League Football Club
- Nickname: Magpies
- Colours: Black; White
- Founded: 1953

Current details
- Competition: Sydney Combined Competition; South Sydney District Junior Rugby Football League

Records
- Premierships: (6) 1980, 1986, 1990, 1991, 2000, 2001 D Grade Premierships = 1997

The Zetland Magpies are an Australian semi-professional rugby league football team based in Zetland, New South Wales, a suburb of south-central Sydney they play in the South Sydney District Junior Rugby Football League.

== Notable players ==
- Darren Brown (1987-98 South Sydney Rabbitohs, Canterbury-Bankstown Bulldogs, Western Suburbs Magpies, Penrith Panthers, Salford Red Devils & Trafford Borough)
- Jim Serdaris (1989-96 South Sydney Rabbitohs, Manly Sea Eagles, Canterbury Bulldogs & Wests)
- Craig Field (1990-01 South Sydney Rabbitohs, Manly Sea Eagles, Balmain & Wests)
- Terry Hill (1990-05 South Sydney Rabbitohs, Sydney, Manly & West Tigers)
- Jim Dymock (1991-04 Wests, London Broncos, Canterbury Bulldogs & Parramatta Eels)
- Nick Zisti (1991-99 South Sydney Rabbitohs, St George Illawarra Dragons, Hunter Mariners, Cronulla & Bradford Bulls)
- Anthony Mundine (1993-00 St George Dragons, Brisbane Broncos & St George Illawarra Dragons)
- Lee Hookey (1999-06 South Sydney Rabbitohs, St George Illawarra Dragons & Penrith Panthers)
