= Reni Maitua =

Australia & Samoa international rugby league footballer

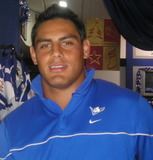

Personal information
- Full name: Papali’i O'Reni Maitua
- Born: 11 June 1982 (age 44) Sydney, New South Wales, Australia

Playing information
- Height: 186 cm (6 ft 1 in)
- Weight: 100 kg (15 st 10 lb)
- Position: Lock, Second-row, Five-eighth, Centre
Club
Years	Team	Pld	T	G	FG	P
2004–08	Canterbury Bulldogs	100	23	0	0	92
2009	Cronulla Sharks	8	0	0	0	0
2011–13	Parramatta Eels	53	6	0	0	24
2014	Canterbury Bulldogs	13	1	0	0	4
2015	Featherstone Rovers	13	5	0	0	20
2015	Salford Red Devils	6	0	0	0	0
2016	Leigh Centurions	29	14	0	0	56
2018	Toronto Wolfpack	8	2	0	0	8
	Total	230	51	0	0	204
Representative
Years	Team	Pld	T	G	FG	P
2005	NSW City	1	0	0	0	0
2006	Australia	1	0	0	0	0
2013–14	Samoa	3	0	0	0	0

Reni Maitua (born 11 June 1982) is a former professional rugby league footballer. An Australian and Samoan International representative player, he previously played for the Canterbury-Bankstown Bulldogs, with whom he won the 2004 NRL Premiership. Maitua covered a number of positions, known for typically playing on an edge as a backrow forward (second row or lock) or centre, Maitua's skillset saw him play in the halves as well.

== Early life ==
Reni Maitua was born in Sydney, New South Wales. He attended Daceyville Public School. Maitua started playing rugby league as a youngster from the encouragement of his parents, playing for both the Coogee Randwick Wombats, and Kensington United as well as brief stints at La Perouse United, and the Maroubra Lions. Maitua then played for South Sydney Juniors which form part of the South Sydney Rabbitohs. He also played junior Rugby Union for Clovelly Eagles and Randwick DRUFC. Maitua is the son of a Samoan father and an Australian mother of Anglo-Celtic descent.

== Rugby league career ==
=== 2002-2008: Signing with Canterbury-Bankstown ===
As a South Sydney junior, a young Maitua had aspirations to represent the South Sydney Rabbitohs at the highest level, however, this was soured by the club as he was dropped from a Harold Matthews Cup squad on the premise of him being a year young for the state under-16s competition. Maitua signed with Sydney's Canterbury-Bankstown club in 2002, spending the first two years representing the Jersey Flegg U20 & reserve grade sides alongside future stars Johnathan Thurston & Sonny Bill Williams winning the 2003 Jersey Flegg Cup Premiership.

Despite the success in the lower grades, Maitua did not make his first grade début until Round 1 of the 2004 NRL season against the Parramatta Eels on 13 March. Maitua played for Canterbury-Bankstown from the interchange bench in their 2004 NRL grand final victory over cross-town rivals, the Sydney Roosters. As 2004 NRL premiers, the Canterbury club faced Super League IX champions, the Leeds Rhinos in the 2005 World Club Challenge. Maitua played at second-row forward in the Bulldogs' 32–39 loss. In season 2005, Maitua had an up and down season, suffering an ankle injury in the trial game against South Sydney Rabbitohs missing up to six games. His return showed he was in good form and was then named in the City Origin squad. But during that game he also suffered another ankle injury which made him sit on the sidelines for nearly half the competition. Maitua had been selected in the Prime Minister's XIII team to take on Papua New Guinea national rugby league team.

On 27 April 2006, it was revealed that Maitua had been charged with drink driving. Canterbury-Bankstown fined Maitua $15,000 over the incident as well as dropping him to Premier League for one week. Maitua was also required to attend an alcohol awareness program and to participate in a community service program. He was also needed to appear in Sutherland Local Court on 18 May where a plea of guilty was entered on his behalf. He will be required to make a personal appearance for sentencing on 3 August. In the meantime, his licence is suspended and the court was told that Maitua will complete a traffic offenders education program before his sentencing. But his sentencing was postponed till 17 August because complications arose as Reni's lawyer advised him not to attend the court appearance on 3 August. Though he appeared at his second court appearance for the sentencing the judge ruled that his licence was to be suspended for 18 months and a fine of $2800.

Maitua had been named in the Australian Rugby League team for the Tri Nations series for the first time in his career after a knee injury ruled Brisbane forward Tonie Carroll out of the upcoming Tri-Nations tournament. His short international career came to a grinding halt after suffering a distal syndesmosis injury to his ankle in the closing stages of the 30–18 victory over New Zealand at Mt Smart Stadium.

In March 2008, Maitua was demoted to reserve grade after he was spotted in a drunken state at a T2 nightclub on Oxford Street, Sydney at 9.30am on a Sunday morning.

=== 2009: Move to Cronulla ===
On 15 June 2009, Maitua was suspended for 2 years for testing positive to a banned substance. He signed with the Parramatta Eels on return from suspension for the 2011 NRL season.

=== 2011-2013: Return to NRL and move to Parramatta ===
Maitua signed with Parramatta in 2011 but was unable to play until his ban ended in May. Due to his good form, inspirational leadership and a new outlook on life, he was made co-captain of the Parramatta club alongside Jarryd Hayne and Tim Mannah in 2013. In June 2013, Maitua was one of 12 Parramatta players that were told that their futures at the club were uncertain by coach, Ricky Stuart. Hasler has confirmed Tooty will add depth to Canterbury-Bankstown in 2014. He would bring experience to the Canterbury team.

At the end of his time with Parramatta Maitua played 53 games and scored 6 tries. He was also a member of the 2012 & 2013 teams which collected the wooden spoon.

In October 2013, Reni was a part of the Samoan team that participated in the 2013 Rugby League World Cup. He made his début in the Samoans' impressive display against the Kiwis. This match however would be his only match of the Tournament, as injury forced him to pull out from the remaining games in the Tournament.

=== 2014: Homecoming ===
In November 2013, Maitua was charged assault after allegedly punching a taxi driver's arm, he later wrote an apology on Twitter and pleaded not guilty. After spending first 8 Rounds of Rugby League in the NSW Cup for the Canterbury club. Maitua was selected to play for Samoa in the 3 May 2014 Pacific Test against Fiji, this was Maitua's second international appearance following his single test for Australia in 2006. Maitua played at five-eighth in the 32–16 win at Penrith Stadium. Maitua finally returned to the first grade side, 6 years after his last appearance for Canterbury-Bankstown in Round 11 against the Sydney Roosters at ANZ Stadium off the bench in the 32–12 loss. Maitua finished Canterbury's 2014 season with him playing 13 matches and scoring 1 try (4p).

On 7 October 2014, Maitua was selected in the Samoan 24-man squad for the 2014 Four Nations series. Maitua only played 1 of the 4 games, Samoa did not select him until the 4th and final game because of Maitua's involvement in a nightclub brawl in Brisbane alongside two other Samoan players, one day before kicking off the Four Nations series.

=== 2015-2018 : UK and retirement ===
On 19 December 2014, Maitua signed a two-year contract with Featherstone Rovers in the Championship starting from 2015. He began the season with Featherstone, moving to Salford Red Devils during Rugby League Super 8s. In 2016 he joined Leigh Centurions in the Championship. Following the 2016 season, Maitua retired from the sport in order to pursue a career in boxing.

He came out of retirement to join Toronto Wolfpack in 2018 on a short-term contract. It was later revealed that Maitua's recruitment would set the ball rolling for eventual recruit Sonny Bill Williams who would also join the club following the 2019 Rugby World Cup.

=== Representative Games ===
- City Origin
- Australia: Prime Minister's XIII
- Australia: 2006 Tri Nations Squad
- Samoa: 2013 Rugby League World Cup squad, 2014 Pacific Test team, 2014 Four Nations squad

== Controversy ==
In 2006, Reni Maitua was convicted of drink driving after he blew 0.165 in a random breath test in Cronulla, while on P-plates. A reading of 0.165 is more than three times the legal limit for a fully licensed driver, but the limit for P-platers is zero. In December 2008, Maitua's contract with the Bulldogs was terminated by the club after he failed to attend training. He is also a known member of the Bra Boys.

On 20 May 2009, Maitua tested positive to a banned drug and was handed a provisional suspension. On 15 June 2009, it was announced that Maitua would be suspended for 2 years following the positive test of the second sample.

In late 2013, it was revealed that Maitua had been suffering from severe depression. In mid 2013, Maitua suffered a breakdown after a game in Brisbane, and days later attempted suicide. Maitua's best friend Willie Tonga was awake at 1:00am when he received a call from Maitua's sister, who had received a text message which scared her greatly. Tonga chose to drive to Maitua's unit, and found Maitua attempting to take his own life. Tonga believes that had he even arrived 5 seconds later, Maitua would not have survived. Maitua and Tonga told their story on the NRL Footy Show in June 2014 as an attempt to help remove the stigma around mental illness in league.
