= Beau Champion =

Australian rugby league footballer

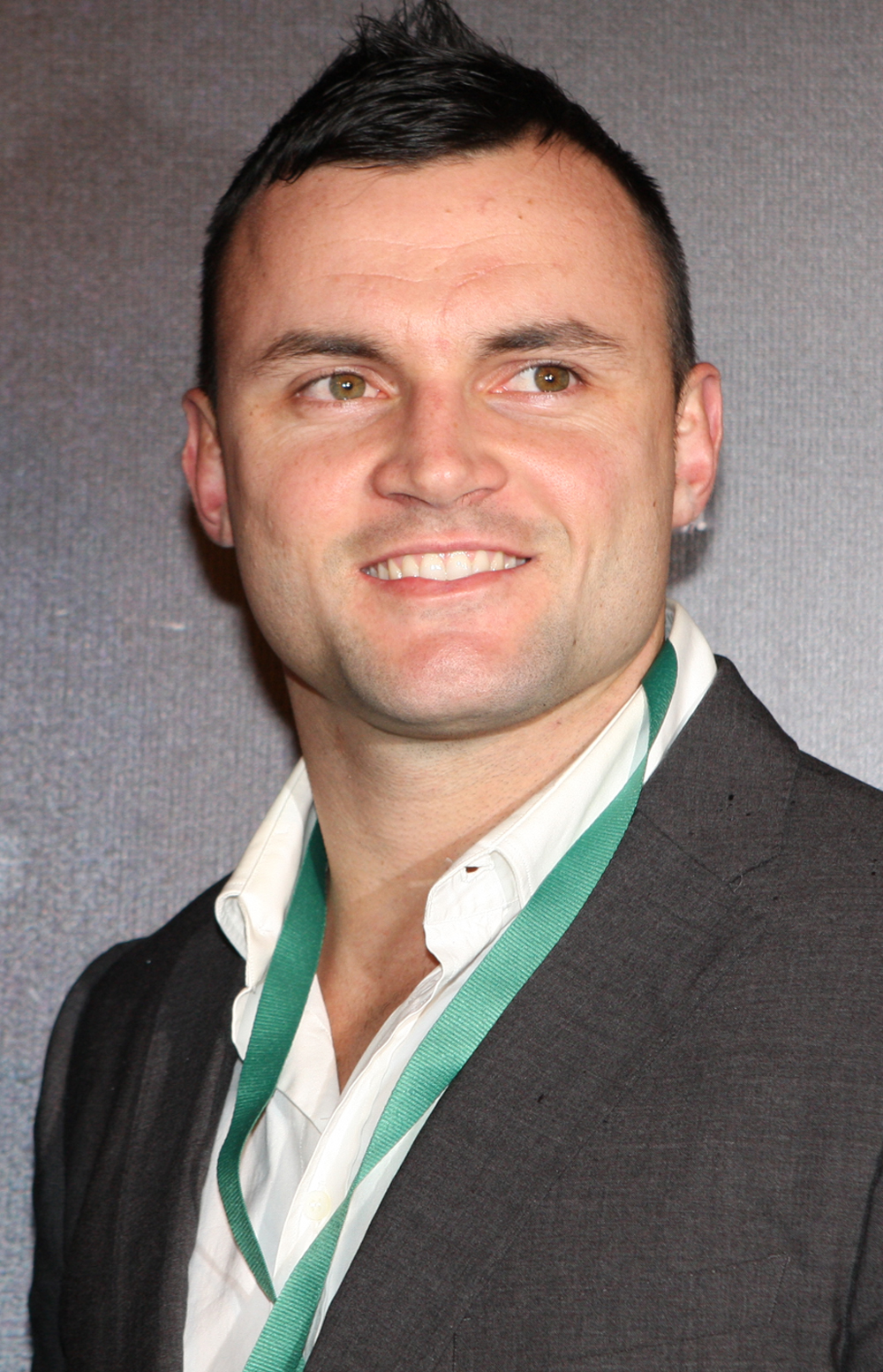
- Champion at the Man of Steel movie premiere in June 2013

Personal information
- Born: 23 December 1986 (age 39) Sydney, Australia

Playing information
- Height: 188 cm (6 ft 2 in)
- Weight: 96 kg (15 st 2 lb)
- Position: Centre
Club
Years	Team	Pld	T	G	FG	P
2005–10	South Sydney	70	33	5	0	142
2011	Melbourne Storm	16	8	0	0	32
2012	Gold Coast Titans	9	4	0	0	16
2013–14	South Sydney	10	4	0	0	16
2015	Parramatta Eels	2	0	0	0	0
	Total	107	49	5	0	206
Representative
Years	Team	Pld	T	G	FG	P
2010–11	Indigenous All Stars	2	0	0	0	0
2010–11	NSW City	2	1	0	0	4

Beau Champion (born 23 December 1986) is an Australian former professional rugby league footballer. He played for the South Sydney Rabbitohs, Melbourne Storm, Gold Coast Titans and Parramatta Eels in the National Rugby League. He is the second cousin of teammate Greg Inglis. Champion's preferred playing position is at Centre after being groomed as a halfback in his debut year. Champion has represented City in the 2010 City v Country Origin as well as making the 2010 Indigenous All-Stars Squad.

== Early career ==
Champion is a South Sydney Junior who played for the South Eastern Seagulls and La Perouse Panthers.

== Senior career ==
=== 2005–2010 ===
Champion made his first-grade debut in round 18 of the 2005 NRL season in a 24–14 win over the Cronulla-Sutherland Sharks at the old Sydney Football Stadium. He finished his debut season playing eight games and kicking three goals. During Champion's first stint at South Sydney, he played 70 games scoring 33 tries and kicking five goals.

On 8 November 2010 it was revealed that Champion's cousin Greg Inglis would most likely sign with South Sydney. Champion, along with Souths owner and Australian actor Russell Crowe, Inglis's close friend Anthony Mundine and billionaire Andrew Forrest, were influences for Inglis's shock move to Redfern.

=== 2011 ===
When it was officially announced that Greg Inglis would be moving to Souths, it was Champion who had to make way due to salary cap pressure. On 24 December 2010 Champion signed a three-year deal with Melbourne, ironically replacing and inheriting the position of his cousin Greg Inglis. On 13 May 2011, Champion signed with the Gold Coast Titans, meaning that the 2011 NRL season would not only be his first season with the Melbourne Storm, but it would also be his last. Champion played 16 games with the Melbourne Storm scoring eight tries as the club claimed the Minor Premiership. Champion played in Melbourne's shock preliminary final loss against the New Zealand Warriors with Champion scoring a try in the game.

=== 2012 ===
Champion had an injury-plagued 2012 with the Gold Coast Titans only playing in nine matches scoring four tries.

=== 2013–2014 ===
On 8 January 2013 the South Sydney Rabbitohs announced that Champion would be returning home to Redfern on a two-year deal covering the 2013–2014 seasons. The Gold Coast Titans released Champion from the final two years of his contract to facilitate this. Titans coach John Cartwright was very supportive of Champion's decision to return to NSW saying "I think most people agree that you play your best football where you are happy and after sitting down and talking with Beau about this opportunity to go back to Souths, we fully understand his reasons why. His home is Redfern and he wanted to go so we wish him all the best for the future."

=== 2015 ===
On 26 August 2014 it was announced that Champion had signed a one-year deal with the Parramatta Eels for the 2015 NRL season. On 19 August 2015 Champion announced his retirement from rugby league after failing to recover from an Anterior cruciate ligament injury sustained during the round 2 match against the Canterbury-Bankstown Bulldogs.
