= Maroubra Lions =

Australian rugby league club based in Sydney, NSW

Club information
- Full name: Maroubra Lions Rugby League Football Club
- Nickname: Lions
- Colours: Primary; Cardinal Red; Myrtle Green; Secondary; Black; White
- Founded: 1952; 74 years ago

Current details
- Ground: Snape Park
- Competition: Sydney Combined Competition; South Sydney District Junior Rugby Football League

The Maroubra Lions is a community rugby league football club located in Maroubra, in the Eastern Suburbs of Sydney, Australia. It is part of Souths Juniors and competes in the mini, mod and A-Grade competitions. The club's colors are like the South Sydney Rabbitohs but without the black and white stripes. Their main rivals are the Eastern Suburbs RLFC club.

== Premierships ==
- Maroubra's A grade side won premierships in: 1979
- Maroubra's Reserve grade side won premierships in:
- Maroubra's Under 18's side won premierships in:

== Notable Juniors ==
Notable First Grade Players that have played at Maroubra Lions include:

- Willie Peters (1997-04 South Sydney Rabbitohs, St George, Wigan)
- Craig Wing (1998-09 South Sydney Rabbitohs & Sydney)
- Braith Anasta (2000-14 Canterbury Bulldogs, Sydney & West Tigers)
- Reni Maitua (2004-14 Canterbury Bulldogs, Cronulla & Parramatta Eels)
- Kane Morgan (2011- South Sydney Rabbitohs
- Campbell Graham (2017- South Sydney Rabbitohs)
- Peter Mamouzelos (2021- South Sydney Rabbitohs)
- Matt Thistlethwaite

== Notable Coaches ==
Cem Onur - U13s, U14s, U15s undefeated premiership winners
