= Russell Fairfax =

Australian RL coach and former rugby league footballer

Personal information
- Full name: Russell Lance Fairfax
- Born: 29 March 1952 (age 74) Sydney, New South Wales, Australia

Playing information

Rugby union
Club
Years	Team	Pld	T	G	FG	P
	Randwick	0	0	0	0	0
Representative
Years	Team	Pld	T	G	FG	P
1971–73	Australia	8	0	0	0	0

Rugby league
- Position: Fullback
Club
Years	Team	Pld	T	G	FG	P
1974–80	Eastern Suburbs	115	37	34	2	181
1981	South Sydney	4	1	0	0	3
	Total	119	38	34	2	184

Coaching information
Club
Years	Team	Gms	W	D	L	W%
1989–90	Eastern Suburbs	36	11	2	23	31
- Source: Rugby League Project

Russell Lance Fairfax (born 29 March 1952) is an Australian former rugby union and rugby league player. A precocious talent, he played his first rugby international while still at school. Having played eight tests for the Wallabies, he moved to rugby league's Eastern Suburbs Roosters in 1974. Following his retirement from rugby league, Fairfax coached in the 1989 and 1990 seasons.

== Early life ==
Russell Fairfax, whose father was in the Australian Army, grew up in Sorrento, Victoria, where he played Australian football. The family moved to Ipswich, Queensland, where he played rugby league, before moving to Sydney.

Fairfax attended Matraville High School and played for La Perouse and Alexandria Rovers rugby league clubs in his junior years, before joining the Randwick club to play rugby union. Playing at fullback he represented Australian Schools on their tours of South Africa (1969) and New Zealand (1970).

== Football career ==
From 1971-73, Fairfax played in eight rugby union tests for Australia.

In 1974, the fullback joined Eastern Suburbs rugby league club and was an instant sensation in the new code. His unorthodox play and long blonde flowing locks made him a crowd favourite. Fairfax played in 115 matches for Easts and won premierships with that club in 1974 and 1975. Fairfax represented both Sydney and NSW during his career but a broken leg suffered during the height of his career in the 1975 season probably prevented him from becoming a dual international. During the 1976 NSWRFL season, Fairfax played at fullback in the unofficial 1976 World Club Challenge match against British champions St. Helens in Sydney.

Fairfax played the final season of his career - 1981 - with the South Sydney club and went on to coach the Snowy River Bears in Group 16.

Fairfax had an unsuccessful stint in coaching at the Eastern Suburbs Roosters in 1989 and 1990.

== Other roles ==
During the 1970s (prior to becoming a full-time professional player), Fairfax taught physical education at Randwick North High School and Cleveland Street High School.

After retiring from football, Fairfax had a long career in sports journalism with Fox Sports.

At the 2017 local government elections, Fairfax stood unsuccessfully as an Independent councillor for Randwick City Council.

== Personal life ==
Fairfax is married with two children. In 2014 he had a serious brain injury that required intensive surgery from which he recovered, but had some memory and personality effects.
