= Clovelly Crocodiles =

Australian rugby league club, based in Sydney, New South Wales

Club information
- Full name: Clovelly Crocodiles Rugby League Football Club
- Founded: 1918; 108 years ago

Current details
- Ground: Burrows Park
- Competition: Sydney Combined Competition

The Clovelly Crocodiles was formed in 1918 under the auspices of the Eastern Suburbs Junior League. The club's colours are red, white and blue.

== See also ==
- Sydney Roosters Juniors
- List of rugby league clubs in Australia
