= Darren Brown (rugby league) =

Australian rugby league footballer (born 1969)

Personal information
- Born: 29 April 1969 (age 57) Sydney, New South Wales, Australia

Playing information
- Position: Lock, Second-row, Centre, Five-eighth
Club
Years	Team	Pld	T	G	FG	P
1989–90	South Sydney	35	6	1	0	26
1991	Canterbury Bulldogs	9	4	3	0	22
1992–93	South Sydney	35	12	0	0	48
1994	Western Suburbs	3	0	0	0	0
1994–98	Penrith Panthers	65	11	0	0	44
1999–01	Salford City Reds	61	12	12	0	72
	Total	208	45	16	0	212

Darren Brown (born 29 April 1969) is an Australian former professional rugby league footballer who played for the South Sydney Rabbitohs, Canterbury-Bankstown Bulldogs, Western Suburbs Magpies and the Penrith Panthers. Brown also played for Trafford Borough in England and for the Salford City Reds in the Super League. He spent most of his career as a lock or second rower, but could also play in the backline.

== Background ==
Brown was born in Sydney and raised in Redfern, New South Wales. He played his junior football with Zetland Magpies, Mascot Jets and Waterloo Waratahs in the South Sydney Juniors, as well as the Brighton Seagulls in the St George Juniors.

== Rugby league career ==
Brown began his first-grade career at South Sydney (first grade player #774) in the 1989 NSWRL season and had two stints at the club.

In between his South Sydney stints he played the 1990 off season with English club Trafford Borough and then returned to Australia for the 1991 season with Canterbury (first grade player #559), where he featured as a centre and five-eighth, with a highlight being a hat-trick of tries in a win over Eastern Suburbs.

After returning to South Sydney for a further two years, Brown joined Western Suburbs (first grade player #974) in the 1994 season and played lock in the first three rounds. He was then sacked by Western Suburbs following his involvement in a brawl outside Canterbury Leagues Club and finished the season with Penrith (first grade player #361).

Used as a forward, Brown continued to play for Penrith for another four seasons, which included two finals appearances in the 1997 Super League season.

From 1999 to 2001 he returned to play in England for the Salford Red Devils (first grade player #965), which he captained.

== Personal life ==
Since retiring from rugby league Brown has worked as a real estate agent and is currently employed as a stevedore (wharfie) on the Port Botany waterfront. In 2016 Brown walked 858 kilometres from the Gold Coast to Sydney with his mates from Rise Foundation Australia to raise awareness for suicide prevention and mental health issues. In 2019 Brown began co-hosting Rabbitohs Radio, a weekly rugby league podcast covering the South Sydney Rabbitohs. In the podcast Brown and close mate Grant Chappell examine Rabbitohs team news, performances and interview special guests.
