= Alexandria Rovers =

Australian rugby league football team based in Alexandria, NSW

Club information
- Nickname: Rovers
- Founded: 1948

Current details
- Ground: Erskineville Oval
- Competition: Sydney Combined Competition, South Sydney District Junior Rugby Football League

The Alexandria Rovers are an Australian rugby league football team based in Alexandria, New South Wales, a suburb of south-central Sydney. They play in the South Sydney District Junior Rugby Football League. The Alexandria Rovers Won their first senior premiership in over 30 years With their A Reserves 2023 team, Defeating The Redfern All Blacks after being down by 12 points at half time. In 2024 the Alexandria Rovers fielded their first A Grade team since the early 90s. Both A Reserves and A Grade won the 2024 Minor Premierships. A Grade defeated Coogee Wombats in extra time to secure the Club’s first A grade premiership in over 30 years. In 2025 Rovers A Reserves narrowly lost to Mascot in the Grand Final. 2026 saw another successful season for the men’s sides. A Grade finished Top 3 and made it to the Preliminary final, falling short vs the eventual Premiers, South Eastern. A Reserves won 7 games in a row to finish the season and won the club’s 3rd premiership in 5 years.

== Notable Juniors ==
Notable First Grade Players that have played in the Alexandria Rovers include:

- Russell Fairfax
- Manoa Thompson
- Craig Field
- Yileen Gordon
- Greg Hawick
- Trent Merrin
- Nathan Merritt
- Adam Reynolds
- Steve Mavin
- Reece Robinson
- Travis Robinson
- Darrell Trindall
- Paul Momirovski

== See also ==
- List of rugby league clubs in Australia
- List of senior rugby league clubs in New South Wales
