= Campbell Graham =

Australian rugby league footballer

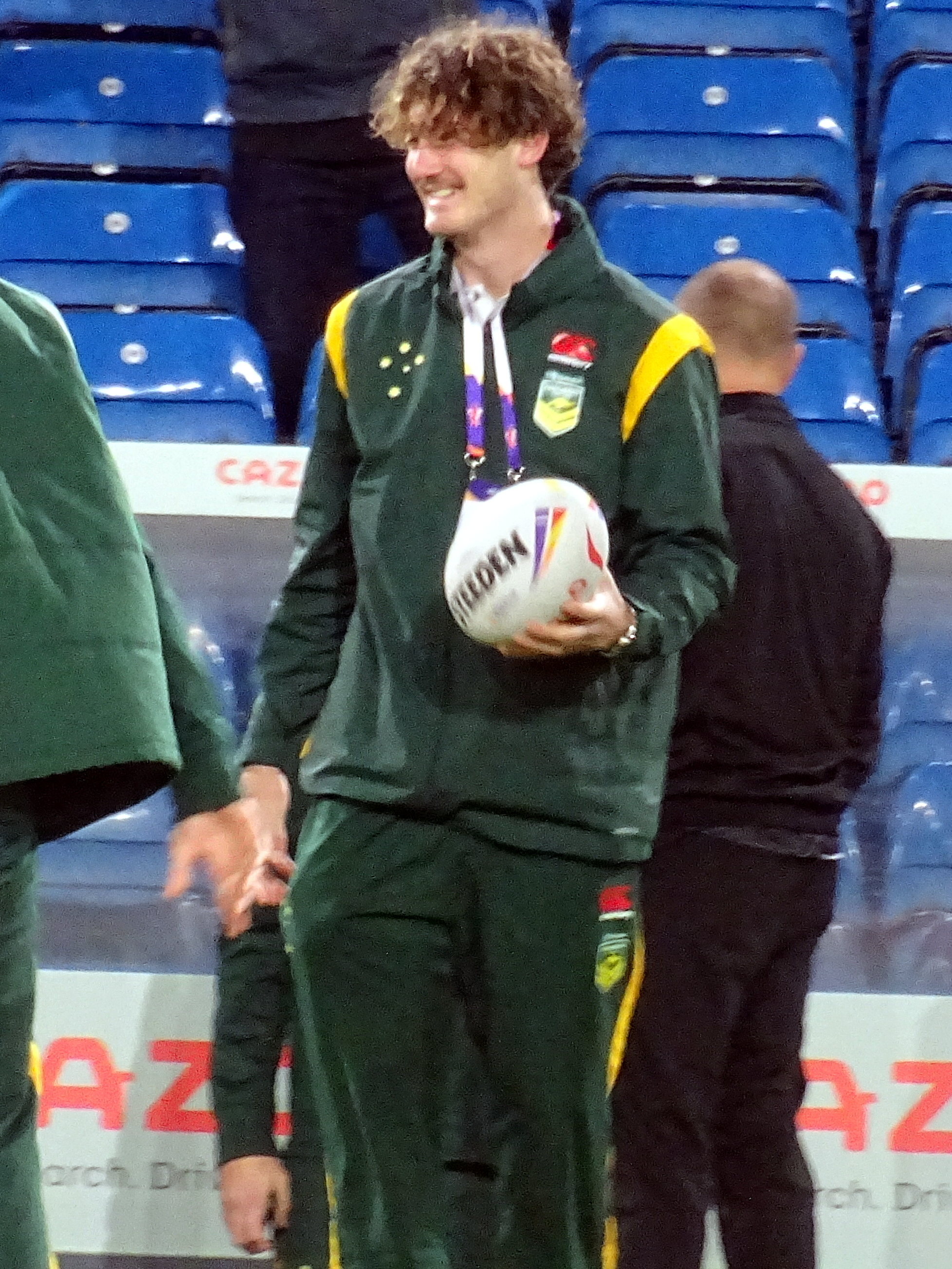

Personal information
- Full name: Campbell Graham
- Born: 2 June 1999 (age 27) Sydney, New South Wales, Australia
- Height: 197 cm (6 ft 6 in)
- Weight: 99 kg (15 st 8 lb)

Playing information
- Position: Centre, Wing
Club
Years	Team	Pld	T	G	FG	P
2017–	South Sydney	161	78	0	0	312
Representative
Years	Team	Pld	T	G	FG	P
2019	Prime Minister's XIII	1	1	0	0	4
2019	Australia 9s	5	2	0	0	8
2022	Australia	2	5	0	0	20
- Source: As of 11 September 2026

Campbell Graham (born 2 June 1999) is an Australian professional rugby league footballer who plays as a centre or winger for the South Sydney Rabbitohs in the National Rugby League (NRL) and Australia at international level.

== Background ==
Graham was born in Sydney, New South Wales, to British-born parents; his father is from Glasgow, Scotland while his mother is from Coventry, England.

He played his junior rugby league for the Coogee Randwick Wombats and Maroubra Lions, before being signed by the South Sydney Rabbitohs. He completed his Higher School Certificate at Marcellin College Randwick in 2017.

== Playing career ==
=== Early career ===
In 2016 and 2017, Graham played for the South Sydney Rabbitohs' NYC team.

Late in 2016, he played for the Australian Schoolboys.

=== 2017 ===
In February, Graham re-signed with South Sydney on a contract until the end of 2019. In round 22 of the 2017 NRL season, he made his NRL debut for South Sydney against St. George Illawarra. He wasn't named in the original 21-man squad that NRL teams are required to pick a game day 17-man squad from, but was allowed to play after Souths sought and were granted an exemption by the NRL to include him after a late injury to Robert Jennings.

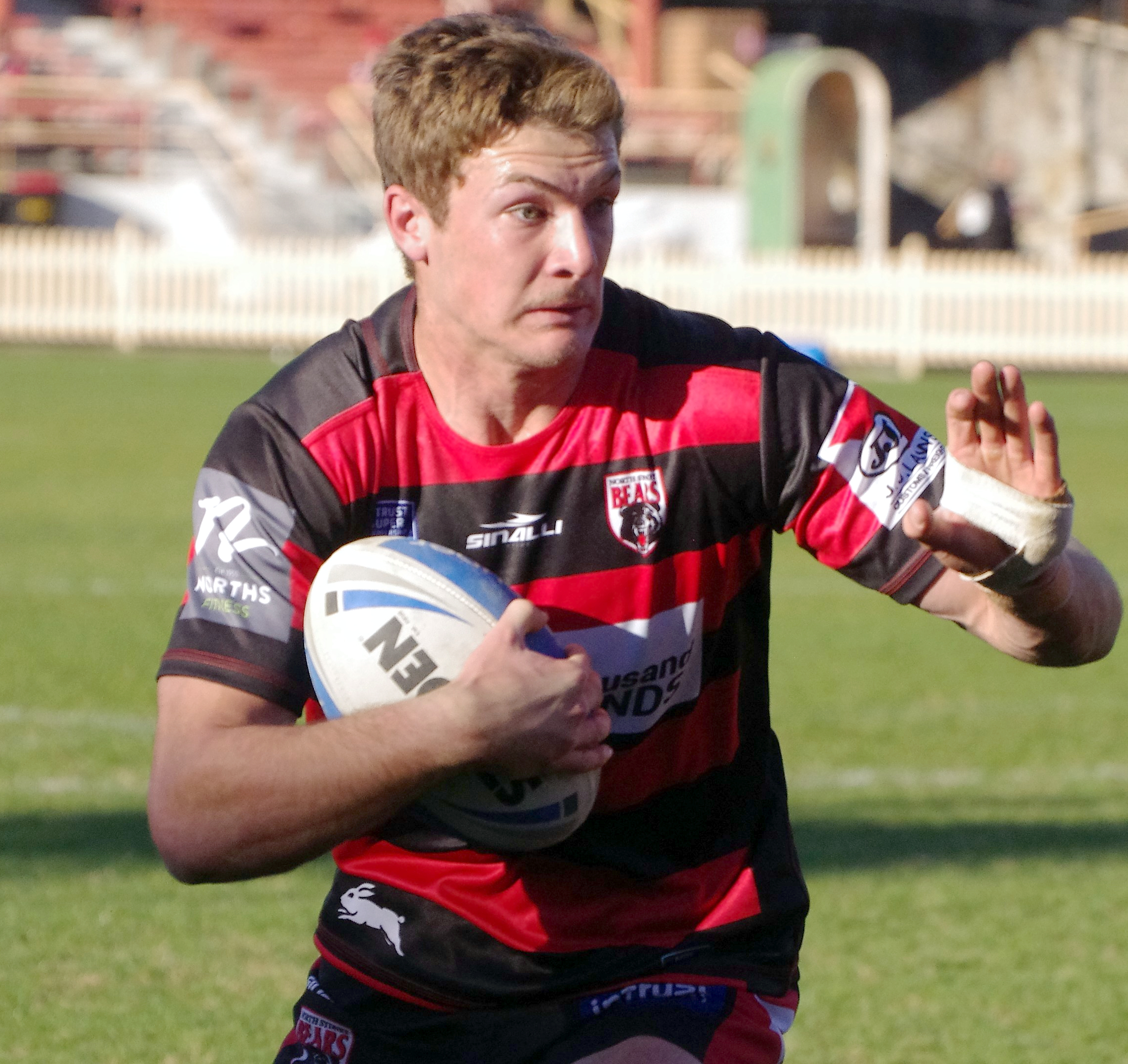
Graham playing for the North Sydney Bears in 2017

Graham was named in Scotland's squad for the 2017 World Cup at the end of the season, but withdrew in order to get a full off-season of training.

=== 2018 ===
Graham spent the first few weeks of the 2018 NRL season playing for South Sydney's feeder side North Sydney in the Intrust Super Premiership NSW. In round 9 of the 2018 season, Graham scored his first NRL try in South Sydney's 36-18 win over the Newcastle Knights at McDonald Jones Stadium. Graham made a total of 16 appearances for Souths in 2018 scoring 7 tries as Souths reached the preliminary final against arch rival Eastern Suburbs but lost the match 12-4 with Graham playing on the wing.

=== 2019 ===
In round 3 of the 2019 NRL season, Graham scored 2 tries as Souths defeated the Gold Coast 28-20 at ANZ Stadium. In round 19 against St. George, Graham scored a try after the siren had sounded as Souths won the match 20-16 after being down 16-14 with a minute remaining.

In round 21 Graham scored a hat-trick in a 26-16 loss to Melbourne Storm at Central Coast Stadium. He was selected at number 4 in Freddy's Team of the Week following his try scoring effort. Graham made a total of 27 appearances and scored 14 tries for Souths in the 2019 NRL season as the club reached their second consecutive preliminary final in a row. Graham scored a try in the preliminary final against the Canberra Raiders but ultimately it wasn't enough as Canberra won the game 16-10.

On 7 October, Graham was selected on the wing for the U23 Australian team.

Graham was called into the Australian squad for the 2019 Rugby League World Cup 9s for the injured Curtis Scott.

=== 2020 ===
In round 15 of the 2020 NRL season, Graham scored two tries in a 56-16 victory over Manly-Warringah at ANZ Stadium.

The following week, Graham scored two tries in a 38-0 victory over Parramatta at Bankwest Stadium.

In round 18 against Wests Tigers, Graham scored two tries in a 26-24 victory at Bankwest Stadium.

Graham played a total of 21 games scoring 13 tries. He played in two of South Sydney's three finals games, missing the preliminary final loss to Penrith through injury.

=== 2021 ===
In round 8 of the 2021 NRL season against Canberra, Graham fractured his hand in South Sydney's victory. He was later ruled out for four weeks.

In round 15 of the 2021 NRL season, Graham scored two tries for South Sydney in a 46-0 victory over Brisbane.

The following week, he scored two tries for Souths in a 38-22 victory over Wests Tigers at an empty Leichhardt Oval.

In round 25, Graham scored two tries for South Sydney in a 20-16 victory over St. George Illawarra.

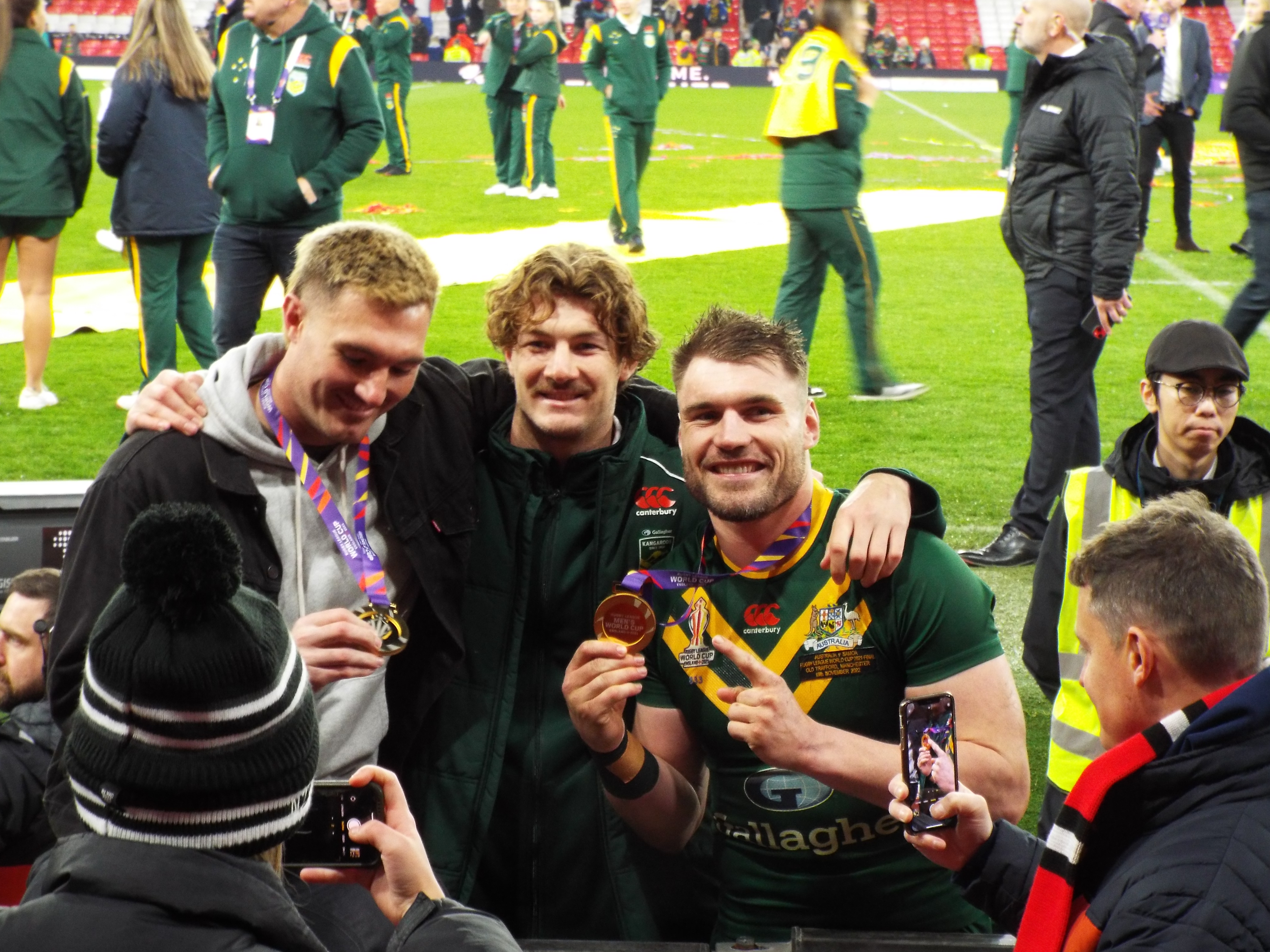
Graham (centre) and Angus Crichton (right) celebrating winning the 2021 RLWC Final

Graham played a total of 21 games for South Sydney in the 2021 NRL season including the club's 2021 NRL Grand Final defeat against Penrith.

=== 2022 ===
On 5 July, it was confirmed that Graham would be ruled out for six-eight weeks with a fractured cheekbone. Graham sustained the injury in South Sydney's 30-12 victory over Parramatta.

Graham returned to the South Sydney side in round 23 of the 2022 NRL season against Penrith. Graham scored a try in the clubs 26-22 loss.

Graham played 20 matches for South Sydney in the 2022 NRL season including all three of the clubs finals matches as they reached the preliminary final for a fifth straight season. Souths would lose in the preliminary final to eventual premiers Penrith 32-12.

In October he was named in the Australia squad for the 2021 Rugby League World Cup. In the second group stage match at the 2021 Rugby League World Cup, Graham made his debut for Australia, scoring a hat-trick in a 84-0 victory over Scotland.

In the final group stage match, Graham scored two tries for Australia in their 66-6 victory over Italy.

=== 2023 ===
In round 7 of the 2023 NRL season, Graham scored two tries for South Sydney in their 36-14 victory over the Dolphins side. In round 9, Graham scored a hat-trick in South Sydney's 32-6 victory over Brisbane. Graham played a total of 21 games and scored 16 tries throughout the year as South Sydney finished 9th on the table and missed the finals. He was awarded the George Piggins Medal as Souths' player of the year.

=== 2024 ===
On 8 February 2024, it was announced that Graham would require surgery on his sternum and would be out for potentially half the 2024 NRL season. Graham played no games in the 2024 season as he would spend the entire season recovering from sternum surgery.

=== 2025 ===
On 4 February, it was revealed that Graham had broken his hand at pre-season training and was ruled out for at least six weeks. In round 1 of the 2025 NRL season, Graham made his long awaited return to the South Sydney team in their match against the Dolphins.

=== 2025 ===
Graham played eleven games for South Sydney in the 2025 NRL season which saw the club finish 14th on the table.

=== 2026 ===
Graham played 19 games for South Sydney in the 2026 NRL season as the club finished 6th on the table and qualified for the finals. Graham played in South Sydney's upset elimination final loss to Newcastle.

== Statistics ==
Year	Team	Games	Tries	Pts
2017	South Sydney Rabbitohs	5	0	0
2018	South Sydney Rabbitohs	16	7	28
2019	South Sydney Rabbitohs	27	14	56
2020	South Sydney Rabbitohs	21	13	52
2021	South Sydney Rabbitohs	21	9	36
2022	South Sydney Rabbitohs	20	5	20
2023	South Sydney Rabbitohs	21	16	64
2025	South Sydney Rabbitohs	11		
2026	South Sydney Rabbitohs	5	3	12
	Totals	147	67	268
