= St Johns Eagles =

Australian rugby league club, based in Punchbowl, NSW

Club information
- Full name: St Johns Eagles Rugby League Football Club
- Nickname(s): Eagles
- Colours: Blue; Gold; Red
- Founded: 1954; 71 years ago
- Website: Official website

Current details
- Ground(s): Begnell Field, Belfield, New South Wales
- Competition: Sydney Combined Competition and Canterbury-Bankstown juniors
- 2017: 3rd
- Current season

Records
- Premierships: 7 (1922, 1923, 1924, 1933, 1934, 1935, 1947)

The St Johns Eagles is an Australian rugby league football club based in Punchbowl, New South Wales, formed in 1954. They currently play in the Sydney Combined Competition and Canterbury-Bankstown Bulldogs district junior league.

The club currently runs 28 age-group teams. In 2017, the club was embroiled in controversy as it emerged that an 8-year-old boy who played for the club appeared to be twice as big as some of the other children he was playing against.

== See also ==
- List of rugby league clubs in Australia
