= Patrice Siolo =

New Zealand rugby league footballer

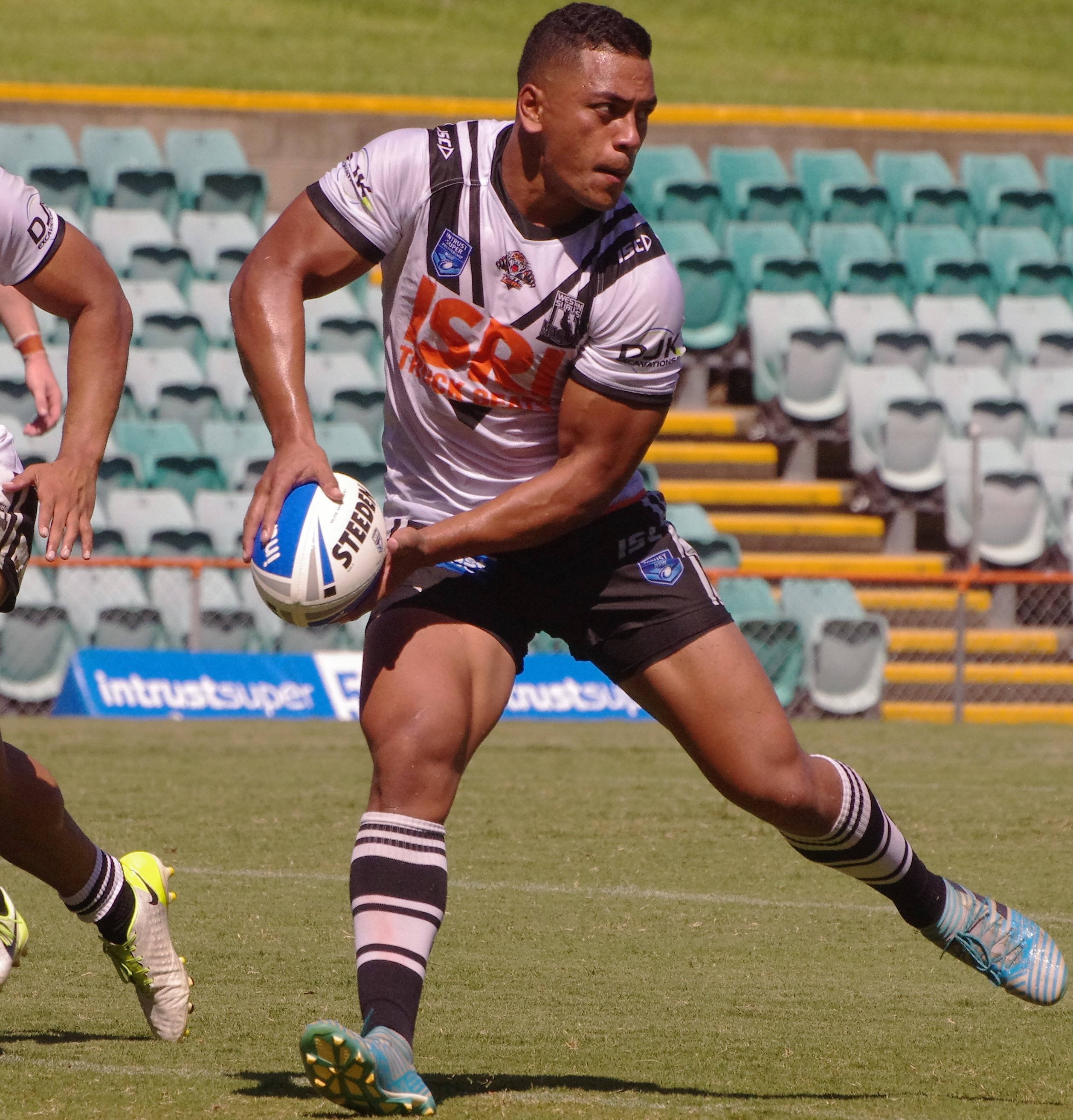

Personal information
- Born: 23 February 1994 (age 31); Auckland, New Zealand
- Height: 185 cm (6 ft 1 in)
- Weight: 100 kg (15 st 10 lb)

Playing information
- Position: Second-row, Lock
Club
Years	Team	Pld	T	G	FG	P
2014	Cronulla Sharks	1	0	0	0	0
2016	South Sydney	2	0	0	0	0
	Total	3	0	0	0	0
- Source: As of 10 August 2019

Patrice Siolo (born 23 February 1994) is a New Zealand professional rugby league footballer who currently plays for the Western Suburbs Magpies in the Intrust Super Premiership NSW. He plays at second-row and lock, and previously played for the Cronulla-Sutherland Sharks.

== Background ==
Born in Auckland, New Zealand, Siolo moved to Sydney, New South Wales at a young age and played his junior rugby league for the Mascot Jets. He was then signed by the South Sydney Rabbitohs.

== Playing career ==
=== Early career ===
In 2012, Siolo joined the Cronulla-Sutherland Sharks and played for their NYC team until 2014.

=== 2014 ===
In Round 25 of the 2014 NRL season, Siolo made his NRL debut for the Sharks against the North Queensland Cowboys.

=== 2016 ===
In 2016, Siolo returned to the South Sydney Rabbitohs and played off the interchange bench in the Rabbitohs' annual pre-season Charity Shield match against the St. George Illawarra Dragons on 13 February. He made his Rabbitohs NRL debut in Round 9 against the Wests Tigers. He spent most of the 2016 season playing for the Rabbitohs' Intrust Super Premiership NSW team, North Sydney Bears, making a total of 17 appearances and scoring 1 try.

=== 2017 ===
On 28 August, Siolo was selected in the 2017 Ron Massey Cup Team of the Year while playing for The Concord-Burwood-Glebe Wolves.

=== 2018 ===
In January 2018, Siolo joined Intrust Super Premiership NSW side the Western Suburbs Magpies.

=== 2019 & 2020 ===
In 2019, Siolo continued to play for Western Suburbs. In 2020, he signed a contract to play for South Sydney in the NSW Cup. At the end of 2020, Siolo was released by South Sydney and signed on to play for the Sunshine Coast in the Queensland Cup competition.

=== 2021 to 2023 ===
In the 2021 Queensland Cup season, Siolo played 18 games as the Sunshine Coast finished 8th place on the table. In the 2022 season, Siolo played 21 games as the Sunshine Coast came within one game of the grand final but were defeated by the Norths Devils in the preliminary final. In 2023, Siolo was limited to only five appearances for the Sunshine Coast.
