= Coogee Randwick Wombats =

Australian rugby league club, based in Coogee, NSW

Club information
- Full name: Coogee Randwick Wombats Rugby League Football Club
- Nickname(s): CRW, Wombats.
- Colours: Green; White
- Founded: 1953
- Readmitted: Mid 1960s

Current details
- Ground: Marcellin Fields
- Competition: Sydney Combined Competition; South Sydney District Junior Rugby Football League
- Current season

The Coogee Randwick Wombats are an Australian rugby league football team based in Coogee, New South Wales and Randwick, New South Wales a suburb of south-central Sydney and play in the South Sydney District Junior Rugby Football League.

== Notable Juniors ==
Notable First Grade Players that have played at Coogee Randwick Wombats include:

- Scott Wilson (1988–99 South Sydney Rabbitohs, North Sydney Bears, Canterbury Bulldogs, Gold Coast Chargers, Western Reds, North Queensland Cowboys)
- Craig Wing (1998–09 South Sydney Rabbitohs & Sydney Roosters)
- Ryan Cross (1998–06 Sydney Roosters)
- Todd Byrne (2001–07 Sydney Roosters & New Zealand Warriors)
- Michael Berne (2002 South Sydney Rabbitohs)
- Reni Maitua (2003–13 Canterbury Bulldogs, Cronulla, Parramatta)
- John Sutton (2004–19 South Sydney Rabbitohs)
- Chris Enahoro (2004–05 South Sydney Rabbitohs)
- Ryan Shortland (2007–08 Melbourne Storm & New Zealand Warriors)
- Peter Betham (2008–15 Brumbies, NSW Waratahs, Rebels)
- Jason Clark (2009–18 South Sydney Rabbitohs)
- Blake Ayshford (2009–19 Wests Tigers, Cronulla Sharks, New Zealand Warriors).
- Nathan Ross (2015–18 Newcastle Knights).
- Campbell Graham (2017– South Sydney Rabbitohs)
- Joseph Suaalii (2021– Sydney Roosters)
- Davvy Moale (2021– South Sydney Rabbitohs)

== See also ==
- List of rugby league clubs in Australia
- List of senior rugby league clubs in New South Wales
