= Botany Rams =

Australian rugby team

Club information
- Full name: Botany Rams Rugby League Football Club
- Nickname: The Rams
- Colours: Green; Gold
- Website: Official website

Current details
- Ground: Booralee Park
- Competition: Sydney Combined Competition, South Sydney District Junior Rugby Football League
- 2015: 3rd

Records
- Premierships: 7 (1922, 1923, 1924, 1933, 1934, 1935, 1947)

The Botany Rams has been operating for over 75 years under the names of Botany United and Botany RSL, before becoming Botany Juniors (Rams). Henry Morris, was President of Botany prior to his appointment as President of Souths Juniors. Their first A grade premiership was in 1922 when they played in the South Sydney District Junior Rugby Football League.

== Premierships ==
A Grade Premiers 1922, 1923, 1924, 1933, 1934, 1935, 1947, G Grade Premiers 1959, E Grade Premiers 1961, E&F Grade Premiers 1962, D grade Premiers 1963, J Grade Premiers 1964 & 1965, F Grade Premiers 1968, D&G Grade Premiers 1970, C Grade Premiers 1971 & 1972, D Grade Premiers 1973, N&K Grade Premiers 1977, J Grade Premiers 1978, L& I Grade Premiers 1979, H Grade Preimers 1980, G grade Premiers 1981, F Grade Premiers 1982, E Grade Premiers 1983, Under 8 Premiers 1996, Under 9 Premiers 1997, Under 7 Premiers 2000, Under 6 Premiers 2001, Under 8 Premiers 2002, U9 Premiers 2007, U9 Premiers 2009, Under 9's Premiers 2011, Under 7's Premiers 2012, Under 16's Premiers 2013, Under 14's Division 2 Premiers 2014. Under 15's Sydney Combined Competition Division 1 Semi Finalists 2015, Under 12's Division 2 Grand Finalists.

== Notable players and coaches ==
- Mario Fenech (1981-95 South Sydney Rabbitohs, Norths & South Queensland Crushers)
- Noel Goldthorpe
- Steve Mavin
- Cameron McInnes (2014- South Sydney Rabbitohs & St. George Illawarra Dragons)
- Steve Mavin (1987-1992 South Sydney Rabbitohs, Canterbury-Bankstown Bulldogs & Trafford Borough

== See also ==
- List of rugby league clubs in Australia
