= Sydney Combined Competition =

Amateur rugby league in Australia

- Current season or competition: 2015 Sydney Combined Competition
- Sport: Rugby league
- Instituted: 2013
- Ceased: 2020
- Number of teams: 58
- Region: Sydney (New South Wales Rugby League)
- Premiers: Penshurst RSL

The Sydney Combined Competition (SCC) formerly Inner City Combined Competition (ICCC) was an amateur rugby league competition for both senior and junior rugby league clubs in the St. George, Canterbury-Bankstown, Balmain, Western Suburbs and Eastern Suburbs areas of Sydney.

The competition replaced the Inner City Combined Competition in 2013. It featured over 40 clubs from under 13's right through to A Grade, before it was scrapped in favour of a new model in 2020, known as the NSWRL conference.

== District clubs (2013–2020) ==
Club	Home Ground
Alexandria Rovers	Erskineville Oval
All Saints Liverpool	Woodward Park
Arncliffe scots	Cahill Park
Auburn Warriors	Lidcombe Oval
Balmain PCYC	Birchgrove Oval
Bankstown Bulls	Ruse Park
Bankstown Sports RLFC	Steve Folkes Reserve
Bass Hill Broncos	Middleton Park
Berala Bears	Peter Hislop Park
Bondi United	Waverley Oval
Botany Rams	Booralee Park
Brighton Seagulls	Scarborough Park
Burwood North-Ryde United	TG Millner Field
Campbelltown Collegians	Bradbury Oval
Campbelltown Warriors	Worrell Park
Carlingford Cougars	Cox Park
Chester Hill Hornets	Terry Lamb Complex
Clovelly Crocodiles	Burrows Park
Concord-Burwood United Wolves	Goddard Park
Coogee Randwick Wombats	Marcellin Fields
Dundas Shamrocks	St Patricks Marist College
Eaglevale St Andrews RLFC	Eschol Park Sports Complex
East Campbelltown Eagles	Waminda Oval
East Hills Bulldogs	Smith Park
Earlwood Saints	Peakhurst park
Enfield Federals	Cooke Park
Five Dock RSL RLFC	Five Dock Park
Greenacre Tigers	Roberts Park
Holy Cross Rhinos	Frank Street/Cressy Rd
Hurstville United	Bexley Oval
Ingleburn Bulldogs	Warren Ritchie Oval
Ingleburn RSL Tigers	Wood Park
Kingsgrove Colts	Beverly Hills Park
Kogarah Cougars	Todd Park
La Perouse United	Yarra Oval
Leichhardt Wanderers	Blackmore Oval
Liverpool Catholic Club Raiders	LCC Sportsground
Liverpool Titans	Jardine Park
Maroubra Lions	Snape Park
Matraville Tigers	Heffron Park
Mascot Jets	Mascot Oval
Milperra Colts	Killara Reserve
Minto Cobras	Benham Reserve
Moorebank Rams	Hammondville Oval
Newtown Junior Jets	Tempe Reserve
Paddington Woollahra Tigers	Centennial Park
Penshurst RSL RLFC	H.E Evatt Park
Redfern All Blacks	Redfern Oval
Renown United	Renown Park
Regents Park Pumas	Guilfoyle Oval
Riverwood Legion	Riverwood Park
South Eastern Seagulls	Pioneers Park
St Christophers RLFC	Bill Delauney Reserve
St. George Dragons (Canterbury)	Lance Hutchinson Oval
St Johns Eagles	Begnell Oval
Strathfield Raiders	Airey Park
Valley United Vikings	Edwin Wheeler Oval
Zetland Magpies	-

== First Grade Premierships ==
Season	Grand Final Information			Minor Premiers
Season	Premiers	Score	Runners-up	Minor Premiers
2012	Hurstville United	4–78	St. George Dragons	All Saints Liverpool
2013	Penshurst RSL RLFC	40–4	All Saints Liverpool	All Saints Liverpool
2014	Penshurst RSL RLFC	30–6	St. George Dragons (Canterbury District)	St. George Dragons (Canterbury District)
2015	Auburn Warriors	20–17	St. George Dragons (Canterbury District)	St. George Dragons (Canterbury District)
2016	Auburn Warriors	20–17	Kingsgrove Colts	St. George Dragons (Canterbury District)

== NSWRL Conference (2021–present) ==
The NSWRL Conference Competitions are a set of competitions for clubs in the Sydney rugby league districts of Balmain, Canterbury-Bankstown, Cronulla-Sutherland, Manly-Warringah/North Sydney, Parramatta and St. George. The competition replaced the Sydney Combined Competition (SCC) in 2020.

=== Metro Open Age Gold ===
The competition is holding one top grade division in 2023, similar to the now defunct Sydney Combined Competition.

Club	Moniker	Home Ground	Suburb	District
Avalon	Bulldogs	Hitchcock Park	Avalon Beach, New South Wales	Manly-Warringah/North Sydney
Belrose Eagles	Eagles	Lionel Watts Oval	Belrose, New South Wales	Manly-Warringah/North Sydney
Berowra	Wallabies	Warrina Oval	Berowra, New South Wales	Manly-Warringah/North Sydney
Cromer	Kingfishers	St Matthews Farm	Cromer, New South Wales	Manly-Warringah/North Sydney
East Hills	Bulldogs	East Hills	East Hills, New South Wales	Canterbury-Bankstown
Forrestville	Ferrets	Forestville Park	Forestville, New South Wales	Manly-Warringah/North Sydney
Harbord United	Devils	Harbord Park	Harbord, New South Wales	Manly-Warringah/North Sydney
Hills District	Bulls	Crestwood Oval	Baulkham Hills, New South Wales	Parramatta Junior Rugby League
Moorebank	Rams	Hammondville Oval	Moorebank, New South Wales	Canterbury-Bankstown
Narrabeen	Sharks	Lake Park	Narrabeen, New South Wales	Manly-Warringah/North Sydney
Ryde-Eastwood	Hawks	Lidcombe Oval	Ryde, New South Wales	Balmain District Junior Rugby League
Wentworthville United JRLFC	Magpies	Ringrose Park	Wentworthville, New South Wales	Parramatta Junior Rugby League

=== Central Northern Open Age ===
The Central Northern Open Age competitions are for clubs in the Sydney rugby league districts of Balmain and Manly-Warringah/North Sydney. The following clubs are participating in Central Northern District competitions in 2023. This competition's Gold division is merged with Central West for 2023 as Metro Open Age Gold (see above).

==== Central Northern Open Age Silver ====
Club	Moniker	Home Ground	Suburb	District
Asquith	Magpies	Storey Park	Asquith, New South Wales	Manly-Warringah/North Sydney
Bondi United	United	Bondi	Bondi, New South Wales	South Sydney District RFL
Concord-Burwood	Wolves	Wentworth Park	Concord, New South Wales	Balmain District Junior Rugby League
Cromer (2)	Kingfishers	St Matthews Farm	Cromer, New South Wales	Manly-Warringah/North Sydney
Leichhardt	Tigers	Birchgrove Oval	Leichhardt, New South Wales	Balmain District Junior Rugby League
Leichhardt	Wanderers	N/A	Sydney	Balmain District Junior Rugby League
Sydney University	Lions	University Oval	University of Sydney	Balmain District Junior Rugby League
TAFE NSW	Polecats	N/A	Sydney	Balmain District Junior Rugby League
Willoughby	Roos	Willoughby Park	Willoughby, New South Wales	Manly-Warringah/North Sydney

==== Central Northern Open Age Bronze ====
Club	Moniker	Home Ground	Suburb	District
Asquith (2)	Magpies	Storey Park	Asquith, New South Wales	Manly-Warringah/North Sydney
Carlingford Cougars	Cougars	N/A	Carlingford, New South Wales	Balmain District Junior Rugby League
Harbord United	Devils	Harbord Park	Harbord, New South Wales	Manly-Warringah/North Sydney
Leichhardt (2)	Wanderers	N/A	Sydney	Balmain District Junior Rugby League
Macquarie University	Warriors	Macquarie University	Ryde, New South Wales	Manly-Warringah/North Sydney
Pennant Hills-Cherrybrook	Stags	Greenway Park	Pennant Hills, New South Wales	Manly-Warringah/North Sydney
Redfern All Blacks	All Blacks	Pioneers Park	Redfern, New South Wales	South Sydney District RFL
Sydney University (2)	Lions	University Oval	University of Sydney	Balmain District Junior Rugby League
TAFE NSW (2)	Polecats	N/A	Sydney	Balmain District Junior Rugby League

=== Central West Open Age ===
Central West Open Age is the premier rugby league competition clubs in the Parramatta and Canterbury-Bankstown districts of Sydney. The competition features 12 clubs in 2023, in a single division, with its gold clubs playing in the Metro Gold competition.

==== Central West Open Age Silver ====
Club	Moniker	Home Ground	Suburb	District
All-Saints Toongabbie	Tigers	C.V. Kelly Park	Toongabbie, New South Wales	Parramatta Junior Rugby League
Bankstown Sports	Club	Bankstown Sports Club	Bankstown, New South Wales	Canterbury-Bankstown
Berala	Bears	N/A	Berala, New South Wales	Canterbury-Bankstown
Canley Vale	Kookaburras	Adams Park	Canley Vale, New South Wales	Parramatta Junior Rugby League
Chester Hill	Hornets	N/A	Chester Hill, New South Wales	Canterbury-Bankstown
Greenacre	Tigers	N/A	Greenacre, New South Wales	Canterbury-Bankstown
Guildford	Owls	Mccredie Park	Guildford, New South Wales	Parramatta Junior Rugby League
Kellyville	Bushrangers	Kellyville Park	Kellyville, New South Wales	Parramatta Junior Rugby League
Lalor Park	Kookas	Cavanagh Reserve	Lalor Park, New South Wales	Parramatta Junior Rugby League
Merrylands	Rams	Merrylands Oval	Merrylands, New South Wales	Parramatta Junior Rugby League
South West	Sharks	N/A	Sydney	Parramatta Junior Rugby League

== See also ==
- Rugby League Competitions in Australia
