= Kane Morgan =

Australian rugby league footballer

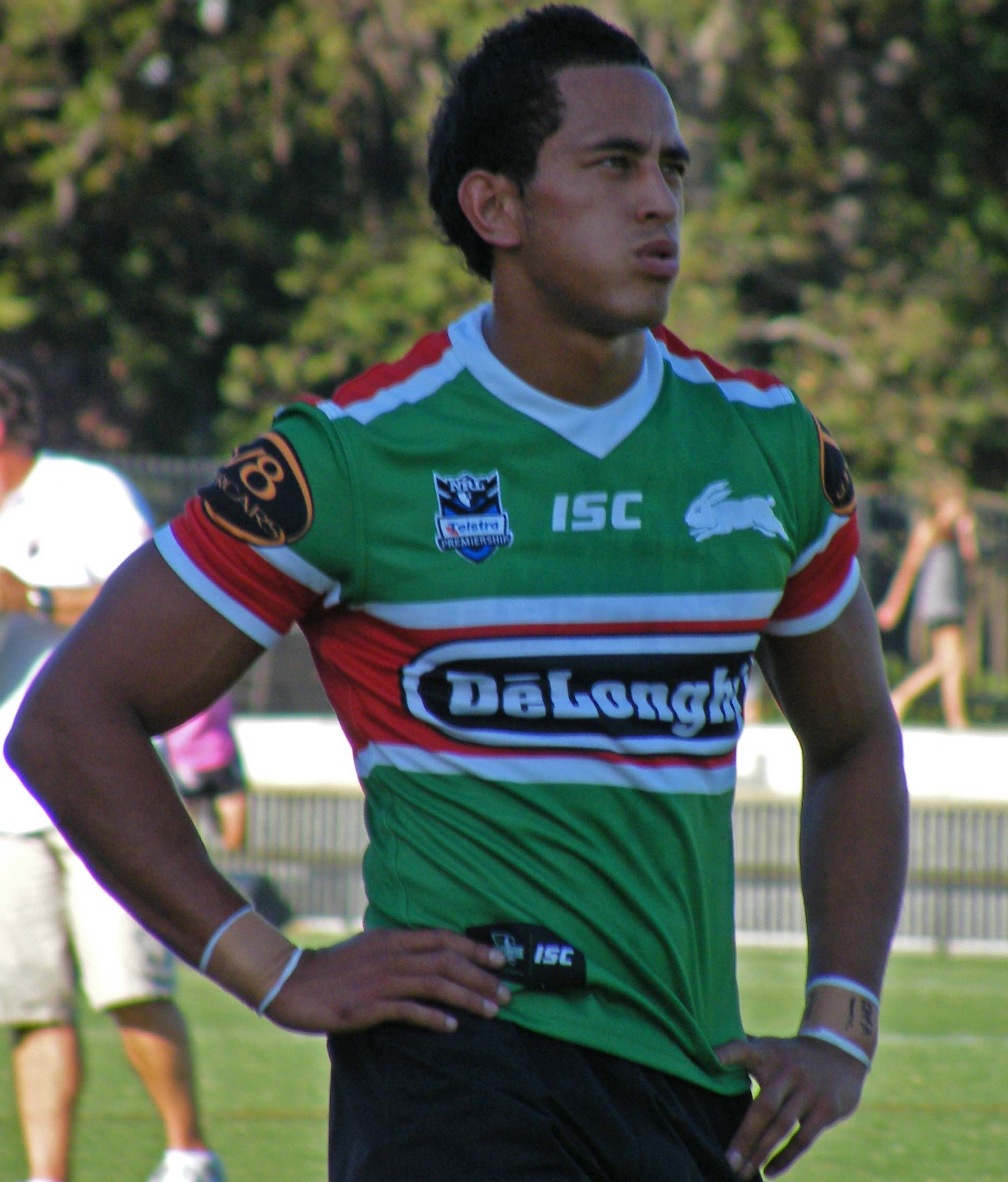

Personal information
- Born: 15 January 1990 (age 36) Newcastle, New South Wales, Australia
- Height: 179 cm (5 ft 10 in)
- Weight: 85 kg (13 st 5 lb)

Playing information
- Position: Wing
Club
Years	Team	Pld	T	G	FG	P
2011	South Sydney Rabbitohs	1	0	0	0	0

Kane Morgan (born 15 January 1990), also known by the nickname "Morkoe", is an Australian former professional rugby league footballer who last played for the North Sydney Bears in the NSW Cup. He previously played for South Sydney in the NRL competition.

== Playing career ==
A junior from the Maroubra Lions club, Morgan represented the New South Wales under 18's.

Morgan played for the South Sydney Rabbitohs Toyota Cup (Under-20s) team in 2009 and 2010. He scored 26 tries in 2009 and was part of the Rabbitohs team that lost the grand final in 2010. He finished his Toyota Cup career with 34 tries from 41 matches.

In 2010 he played for the Junior Kiwis.

Morgan made his first grade debut for the Souths in 2011 on 1 April against the Manly-Warringah Sea Eagles.

In May 2012 he played for Sydney University in the Shute Shield and scored a try against Gordon.

Kane Morgan joined South Sydney Rabbitohs feeder club North Sydney Bears for the 2014 season.

Morgan made a total of 22 appearances for Norths.
