= Chris Enahoro =

Australian rugby league footballer

Personal information
- Full name: Chris Enahoro
- Born: 7 April 1983 (age 41); Brisbane, Queensland, Australia
- Height: 197 cm (6 ft 6 in)
- Weight: 115 kg (254 lb; 18 st 2 lb)

Playing information
- Position: Centre
Club
Years	Team	Pld	T	G	FG	P
2004–05	South Sydney	2	0	0	0	0

Chris Enahoro (born 7 April 1983) is an Australian former rugby league footballer who played in the 2000s. He played for the South Sydney Rabbitohs. His position of choice was centre.

== Playing career ==
Enahoro as a youngster played in the South Sydney Juniors competition for Coogee Randwick Wombats. He made his first grade debut in his side's 62−22 loss to the Canberra Raiders at Bruce Stadium in round 26 of the 2004 season. Enahoro's only other first grade appearance came in his side's 36−12 loss to the Brisbane Broncos at Lang Park in round 12 of the 2005 season. He signed to play with the Gold Coast Titans for the 2007 season, but did not make any first grade appearances for the club.
