= Sydney Roosters Juniors =

Junior rugby league club in New South Wales, Australia

The Sydney Roosters Junior Rugby League (formerly known as the Eastern Suburbs District Junior Rugby League) is an affiliation of junior rugby league football clubs in the Eastern Suburbs of Sydney. The league runs competitions for female and male junior players aged 4 to 8 covering the local government areas of Woollahra, Waverley and the northern parts of Randwick and the City of Sydney.

== Clubs ==
Three clubs compete in the Sydney Roosters JRL:

- Bondi United
- Clovelly Crocodiles
- Paddington Colts

=== Former Clubs ===
Clubs that have formerly played in the league include:

Astra Hotel Knights, Bondi Junction Hotel, Bondi Royals, Bondi Sharks, Brighton Hotel Jets, Brothers, Charing Cross, Coogee Bay Hotel, Coogee Dolphins, Denison Devils (Denison Hotel,Bondi Junction Exchange Hotel, Double Bay, Dunbar United, East Randwick, Moore Park Lions, Nelson Sharks, Paddington CYO, Paddington Tigers Paddington Woollahra RSL, Rose Bay Rams, Tea Gardens Hotel, Fitzroy, Woollahra Waratahs, Woolloomooloo Warriors, Waverley Juniors.

The Paddington Colts, a longstanding former Eastern Suburbs Junior club, returned to the junior league competition for the 2016 season, after 15 years lying dormant.

== Notable juniors ==
Current and former NRL players who played in the Eastern Suburbs District Junior Rugby League include:

- Anthony Cherrington
- Blake Ayshford
- Bryan Fletcher
- Craig Field
- Craig Salvatori
- Ferris Ashton
- Ian Rubin
- James Tamou
- Jim Dymock
- John Peard
- Johnny Mayes
- Kevin Hastings
- Kevin Junee
- Lachlan Lam
- Luke Ricketson
- Matthew Elliott
- Paul Dunn
- Ryan Cross
- Sandor Earl
- Shaun Kenny Dowall
- Tom Symonds
- Victor Radley

== Turf wars ==
When the Sydney Roosters or Eastern Suburbs District Rugby League Football Club (ESDRLFC) first entered the New South Wales Rugby League (NSWRL) competition in 1908, the tricolours would become neighbours to fellow city counterpart, the South Sydney Rabbitohs, then the South Sydney District Rugby League Football Club (SSDRLFC). The original articles of association binding both the ESDRLFC and SSDRLFC with the NSWRL defined the territories of both clubs. Easts were formed to represent the local government areas of the City of Sydney, Darlinghurst, Paddington, Vaucluse, Woollahra, Waverley and Randwick. Meanwhile, Souths were to represent the local government areas of Redfern, Alexandria, Zetland, Waterloo, Mascot and Botany. Notwithstanding the local junior boundary changes referred to in this article, these articles of association have not changed, and as such the Roosters at senior level technically represent all of the local government areas as assigned in 1908, subsequent council mergers aside.

As such, Anzac Parade separated the territories for both inner-Sydney clubs when the boundaries were first established the previous year. Souths' boundaries were based on the municipalities of Redfern, Botany, Alexandria, Mascot and Waterloo, while the Roosters' boundaries were those of the eastern municipalities of Paddington, Woollahra, Vaucluse, Randwick and Waverley. Many of these councils had then amalgamated, as demographic changes affected the inner and eastern suburbs of Sydney. Randwick Council has a western and southern boundary of Anzac Parade and incorporates all those eastern suburbs east of Anzac Parade, and these suburbs like Waverly, Bondi, and Woollahra were all part of the Roosters' territory since 1908.

The new residential league boundaries set out in 1937 would take junior league territory away from the Roosters, and hand it over to rival neighbouring club South Sydney after Easts had won 3 premierships in a row.. There was request in 1955 to return this area but it was not approved by the NSWRFL.

In the mid-20th century, the southern half of Roosters junior territory within the Randwick local government area was handed to South Sydney. The NSWRL made this change to 'even the competition' as South Sydney's original heartland, around Redfern and Waterloo, had rapidly industrialised and de-populated. Rabbitohs stalwart S.G. Ball was a dual administrator within South Sydney Rabbitohs and the New South Wales Rugby League at the time. The Rabbitohs were in a highly successful period and had established South Sydney Juniors Rugby League Club in Kingsford, Roosters territory in recent times.

Debate still continues amongst rival fans as to how and why Eastern Suburbs junior territory, comprising suburbs with junior league clubs rich in talent and numbers in the Randwick and Coogee areas, was given to South Sydney. The Roosters expressed disappointment at losing some of its junior clubs, but the NSWRL would not waver.

This was not to be the end of struggle for junior territory between the two inner-city clubs. In the 1980s some junior clubs such as Paddington Colts that were within Roosters territory became dissatisfied with Roosters management and affiliated with South Sydney.

After the Newtown Jets were expelled from the NSWRL in 1983, most of their junior district was eventually absorbed into the South Sydney junior district in 1987, with some pockets absorbed by the Canterbury-Bankstown Bulldogs.

With the tide having turned compared to the situation decades earlier, and the Roosters having a much smaller junior League than South Sydney, Eastern Suburbs at this time then made unsuccessful attempts to regain the suburbs on the same grounds used to hand the southern parts of Coogee and Randwick from Easts to Souths, that of providing an 'even competition'. The NSWRL, controlled at the time by a Board with a ruling faction of representatives from South Sydney (Terry Parker), Balmain (Keith Barnes), Canterbury (Peter Moore) and Manly (Ken Arthurson), refused to redraw the boundaries.

The Paddington Colts club announced it will be fielding teams in most junior league grades in the 2016 season. After spending its previous last few years in the 1990s affiliated with the Rabbitohs, the Colts have announced they will be returning to the fold and allying themselves with their traditional senior partners, the Roosters. Known as only 'the Colts' during their time estranged from the Roosters, the newly formed junior club will display the Paddington suburban name, having returned home as a Roosters junior club. Rugby League legends Brad Fittler and Bryan Fletcher will coach and mentor young Colts players, while Roosters assistant coach Andrew Johns will also impart his knowledge upon young Rugby League aspirants in Sydney's east.

Sydney Roosters officials and legendary players are hopeful the resurrection of Paddo Colts will spark a renewal of junior Rugby League in Sydney's Eastern Suburbs. Other areas on which the game had prominany junior league teams are currently under analysis for potential resurrection. Areas which may field future junior Rugby League teams in the East of Sydney include Rose Bay, Woolloomooloo, Waverley, Bondi Junction and North-Eastern Randwick and Coogee.

== See also ==
- Balmain District Junior Rugby League
- Cronulla-Sutherland District Rugby Football League
- Manly-Warringah/North Sydney District Rugby League
- Parramatta Junior Rugby League
- Penrith District Rugby League
- South Sydney District Junior Rugby Football League
- Rugby League Competitions in Australia
