= Erskineville Oval =

Sporting venue in Erskineville, Sydney, New South Wales, Australia

Coordinates: 33°54′7″S 151°11′27″E

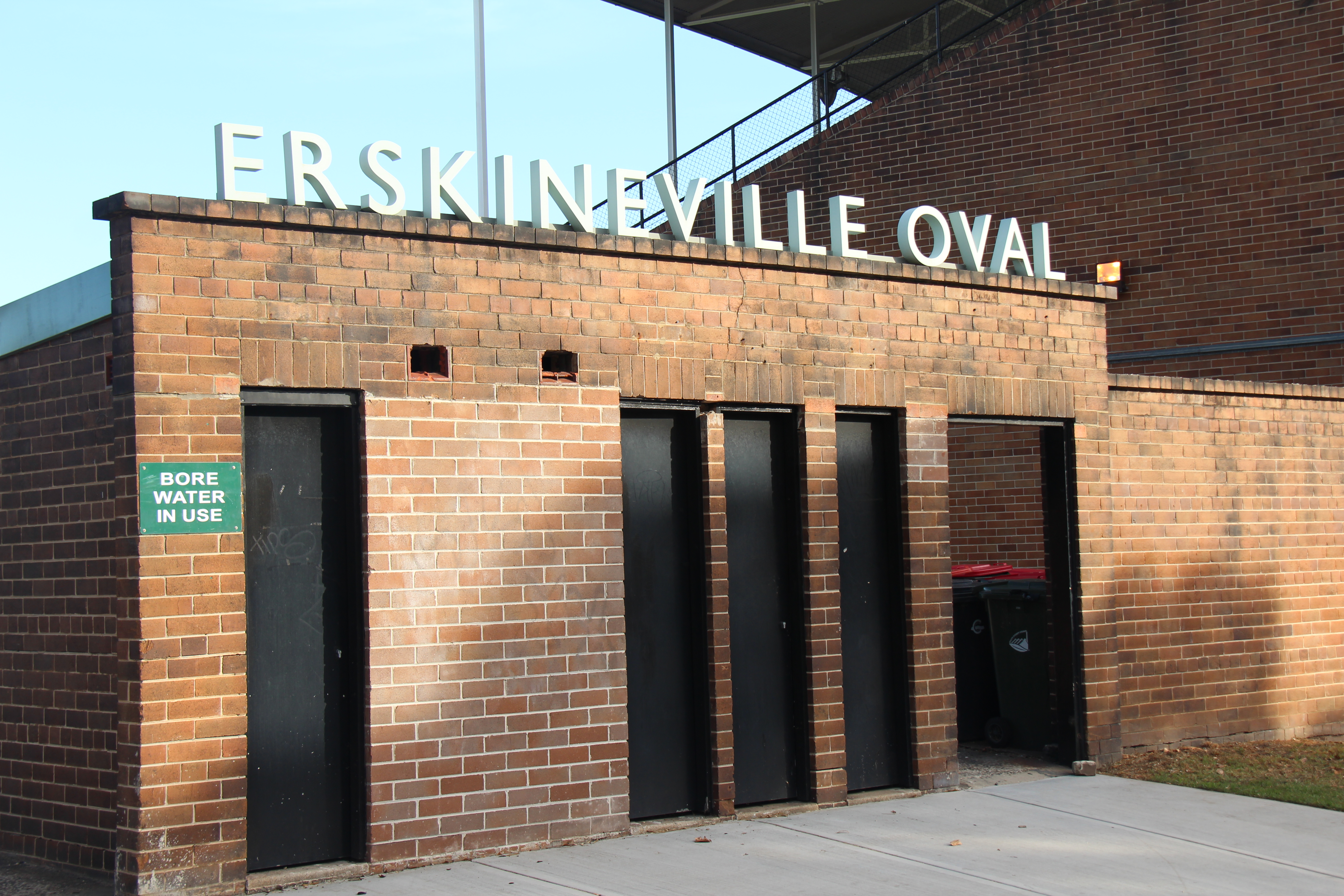
- Interactive map of Erskineville Oval
- Location: 149 Mitchell Road, Erskineville
- Owner: City of Sydney
- Operator: City of Sydney
- Capacity: 5000
- Surface: Grass

Construction
- Groundbreaking: 1885
- Opened: 1885
- Renovated: 1937, 2006

Tenants
- Newtown (NSWRL) (1913–1954); Alexandria Rovers

Erskineville Oval is a sporting venue in Erskineville, Sydney, Australia. Originally developed and opened in 1885 as Macdonaldtown Park, it was later renamed in 1892 to its current form with the municipality name change of the local government body. At approximately a capacity of 5000 spectators, previously 2000 Erskineville Oval was formerly an Australian Rules Football venue as of 1903 when the NSW Australian Football League was founded. From 1913, the ground become a rugby venue as well, in which it has since hosted professional teams such as Newtown and the South Sydney Rabbitohs.

== History ==
The ground of Erskineville Oval is upon grants originally acquired by Nicholas Divine in 1794 and John Campell in 1825. However, the venue itself remained undeveloped due to multiple lawsuits over many years. On 28 July 1885, 22 acres of land were declared Macdonaldtown Park. This remained until 1892 before the named was changed to Erskineville Oval. This was done during the municipality name change of local Erskineville government.

Previously, the oval was bound by Swanson Street, Copeland Street, Ashmore Street, Binning Street and Mitchell Road but has since undergone redevelopment in both 1937 and more recently in 2006. When first developed in 1937 under the Erskineville Housing Scheme, the ground was altered with the addition of housing on and around the oval. This resulted in the current layout of the oval and the subsequent formation of the adjacent Harry Nobel Reserve. Over its history, Erskineville Oval has been used as a sporting venue for various sporting codes, the most notable of which includes the NSW Australian Football League, NSW Rugby Football League as well as various levels of local Australian Rules, rugby and cricket within the Erskineville and Macdonaldtown community.

At present, Erskineville Oval is home to the Erskineville Gazelles, a semi-professional rugby league team based out of Erskineville.

== Ground Usage ==
After its development in 1885, Erskineville Oval became a major sporting ground for the NSW Australian Football league after its formation in 1903, it was later also used for other sports including rugby league, baseball and boxing.

=== Australian Football ===
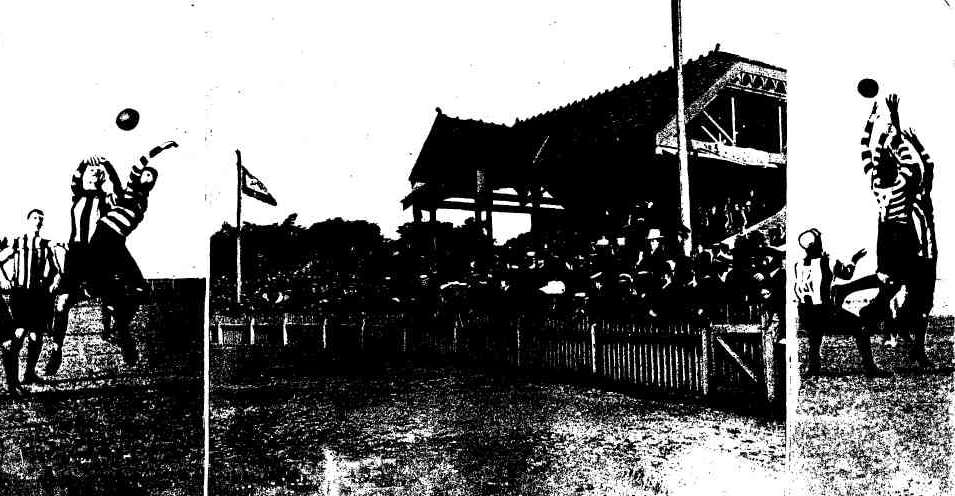
Collingwood vs Geelong in 1909

Erskineville Oval was first used as a sporting ground following the inception of the local senior New South Wales Football League in 1903. This included Newtown which would be the home team. One of the first matches was East Sydney Football Club vs Alexandria Football Club. From 1907, however, its use of the ground was restricted due to clashes with rugby league which had begun to schedule matches there and the NSWFL was under pressure to continue to retain the ground.

In 1909, a Victorian Football League between Geelong Football Club and Collingwood Football Club was played on the ground in front of a large crowd.

Local NSWAFL continued to use it as one of their main grounds on the 1910s and 1920s (as only two grounds available to the NSWAFL, the other being Hampden Oval), hosting premiership final games in 1910, 1914 and 1919.

The Newtown Football Club folded in 1987 A new Newtown Football Club was reintroduced as a junior Auskick club in 1999. No longer able to use Erskineville Oval as their home venue, the junior club would instead choose a new home venue in Alan Davidson Oval, Sydney Park.

Erskineville Oval also hosted Australian Rules Football umpires who used the ground as a training facility. They did this in conjunction with the then training Newtown, sharing the ground.

=== Rugby League ===
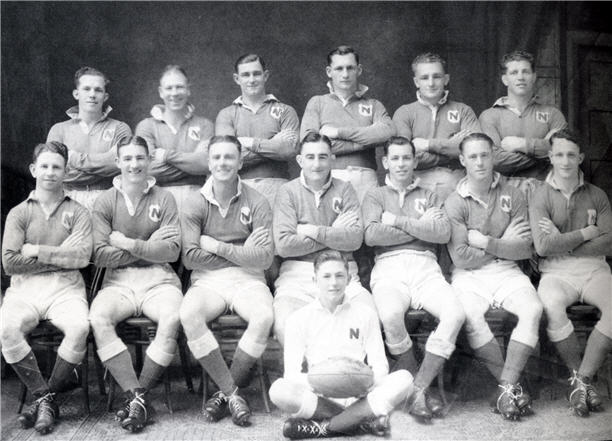
1943 Newtown Jets Premiers

Rugby league authorities began scheduling matches there from 1906 with second grade matches followed by first grade matches from 1907.

Newtown club (established 1908) used it as the home for its first grade side from 1913 to 1954 before they moved training venues to their now home ground Henson Park. In this period, the Newtown club won two premierships competing in the NSW Rugby Football League. This was achieved in 1933 and 1943 where both games were played at the Sydney Cricket Ground. This move was due to the Metters field being repeatedly reported as too hard to play on as well as lacking the sufficient facilities for the team and supporters. As such, Newtown were moved to Erskineville Oval which provided more reasonable resources. The club later moved permanently to Henson Park in 1954 as Erskineville Oval could no longer provide adequate crowd amenities for the club's supporters. The last ever first grade rugby league match to be played at the ground was on 26 March 1954. In the game, Newtown played against Canterbury-Bankstown. Newtown won the match 16–13.

The ground is currently a home ground for Souths Juniors as well as The Alexandria Rovers who play in the Sydney Combined Competition and also the semi-professional rugby league team Erskineville Gazelles.

More recently it has been used as a temporary training venue for the South Sydney District Rugby League Football Club. The shift of the professional club funded improvements to the oval enabling South Sydney to use it as a training. This was done from 2006 to the completion of their permanent home ground Redfern Oval in 2008.

=== Baseball ===
From 1932, the ground was used as the main ground in Sydney for baseball which was played in the summer.

=== Boxing ===
Erskineville Oval is a regular training venue for many boxing athletes under the tuition of Johnny Lewis. Johnny Lewis is a well renowned boxing training who, as of 2017, was inducted into the International Boxing Hall of Fame. From as early as 1960, Lewis would train Australian boxers on the steps of the main grandstand of Erskineville Oval. Here, boxers such as Jeff Fenech, Jeff Harding and Kostya Tszyu would practice from as early as 6am. All of whom went on to become boxing world champions in their various weight classes.

== Renovation and Redevelopment ==
Erskineville Oval has been majorly renovated on two separate occasions. The first was the NSW Government's Erskineville Rehousing Scheme which took place in 1937. The second occurred in 2006. This was in the anticipation of the South Sydney Rabbitohs' temporary use of the oval.

=== 1937 NSW Government's Erskineville Rehousing Scheme ===
In 1937, Erskineville Oval was subject to renovation by the council under the NSW Government's Erskineville Rehousing Scheme. The park was temporarily taken over by the council during the length of the project. This plan included the implementation of multiple flats and the instalment of the Lady Gowrie child care facility. Both additions were built upon the oval and in the surrounding Erskineville neighbourhood. The housing scheme constructed during this time is one of the only housing projects conducted during the inter-war period. It is also the only project undertaken by the Housing Improvement Board in this time. After the completion of the project in 1940, the oval was reconstructed.

The completion of the Erskineville Rehousing Scheme resulted in the implementation of Fox Avenue, a street that intersected through the previous land of Erskineville Oval, creating two separate land entities. This newly separated piece of land bordered by Fox Avenue and Swanson Street was later named Harry Nobel Reserve in 1960.

=== 2006 Facility Upgrades ===
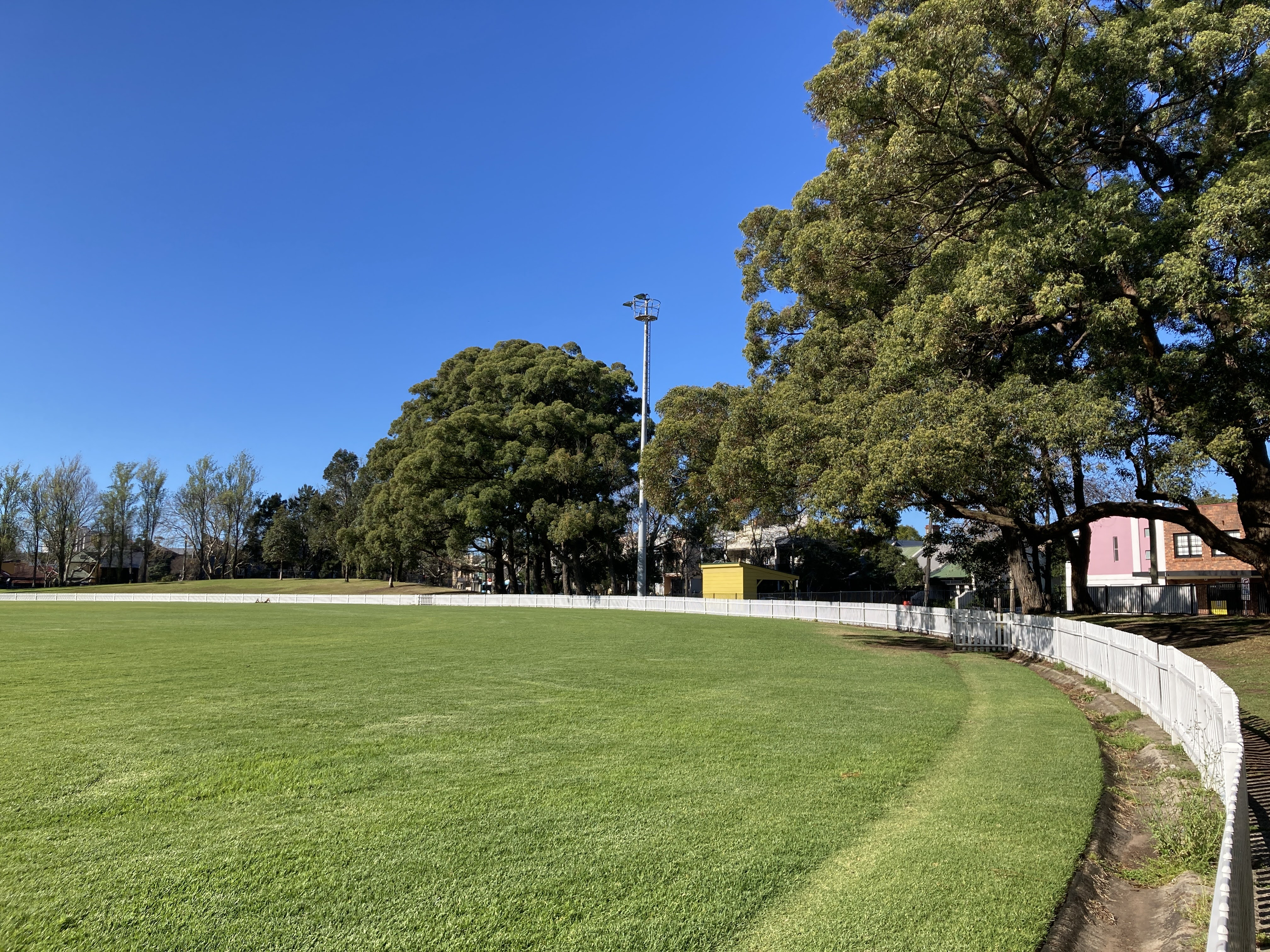
Part of Erskineville Oval, showing the perimeter fence

In 2006, Erskineville Oval received facility upgrades in preparation for its temporary use by the South Sydney Rabbitohs as a training ground. This upgrade was done in consultation between both the City of Sydney Council as well as the South Sydney rugby club. The renovations were funded by a $300,000 package from the council as a part of their $100 million investment to upgrade and create local green space.

In this project, upgrades were made to the ground surface with the further installation of an oval perimeter fence. Seating capacity was also increased as well as refurnished. Furthermore, pedestrian access was added onto the oval from Ashmore Street as well as upgraded training lights and public toilet facilities for both player and spectator use.

== Conservation ==
Erskineville Estate Heritage Conservation Area is a collection of cultural landscape that encompasses Erskineville Oval as well as surrounding area. This areas includes Harry Nobel Reserve and the Erskineville Housing Scheme. This is conservation status is majorly due to the Erskineville Housing Scheme in 1937 which was conducted by architects William Richardson and Morton Herman. Their work has since been deemed historical, a visual reflection influenced by the functional European thinking of the time. The open space and buildings erected by the scheme are also representative of the inter-war attitude to social issues, in particular with the appropriate clearing of urban slums. As such, Erskineville Oval and its surrounding area is listed as a heritage conservation area.

The Lady Gowrie child care facility is also part of the Erskineville Estate Heritage Conservation Area. Completed in 1940 after the renovation of Erskineville Oval, it was designed by Joseph Fowell, Kenneth McConnel and George Mansfield, prominent architects who had completed other works in Sydney and Australia prior. The child care built during the renovation is one of a series, with a Lady Gowrie facility built in every state of Australia during the 1930s. Due to this, the child care is now listed as a heritage conservation area for both its Australian historical prominence and as evidence for the approach towards children's education and care during the 1930s period.

== Harry Nobel Reserve ==
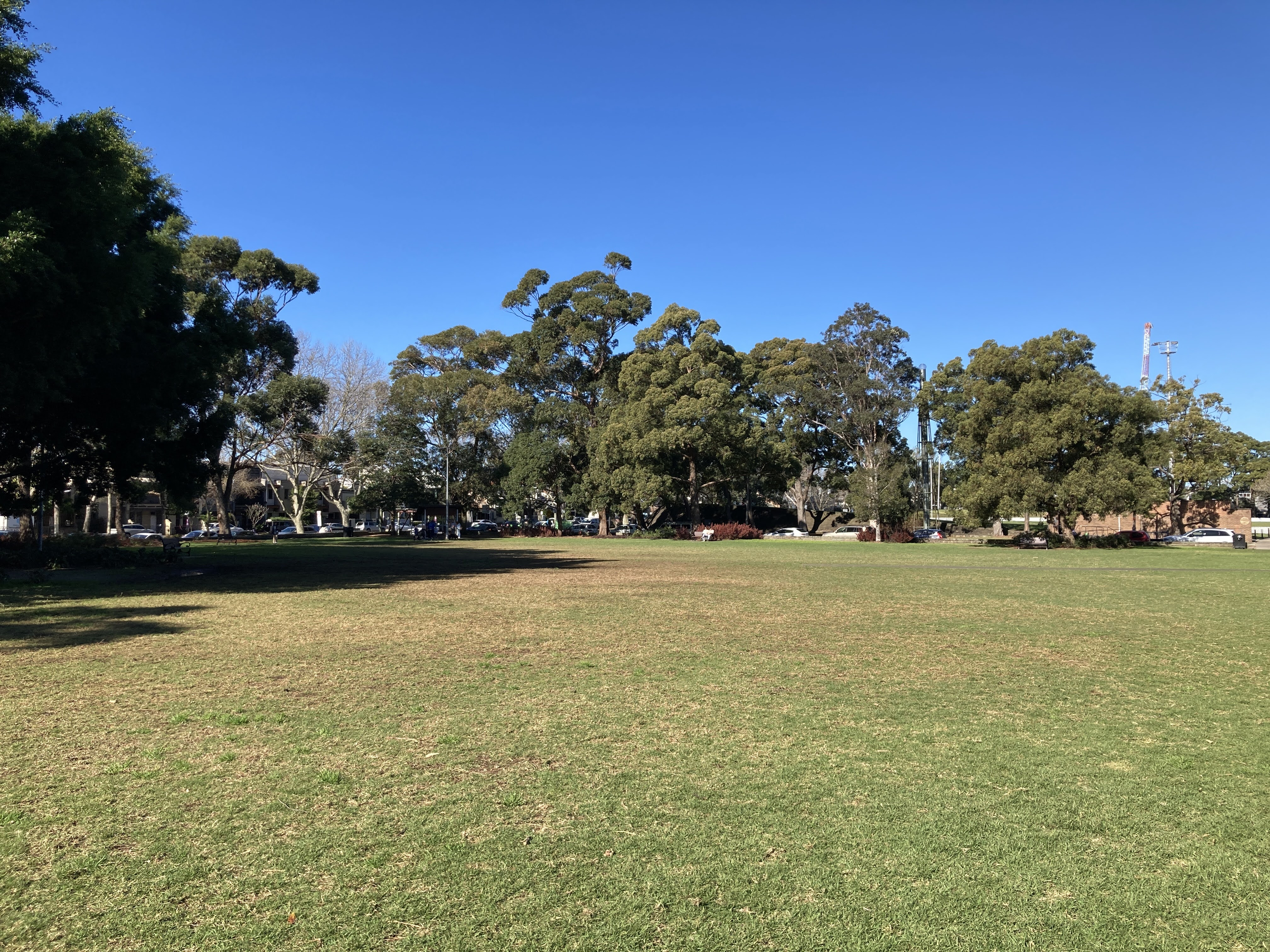
Part of Harry Nobel Reserve in 2023

Harry Nobel Reserve was originally part of Erskineville Oval prior to 1937 in which a rehousing scheme resulted in the renovation of the area. Officially reopened in 1938, the region now contained two separate parks split by the newly formed Fox Avenue. The main region bounded by Mitchell Road remained as Erskineville Oval but it wasn't until 1960 that the park bordered by Elliott Avenue was officially named Harry Nobel Reserve. This was done in honour of Harry Nobel, an Alexandria alderman and state parliament member for Redfern who had died in 1949.

== Events ==
=== Macdonaldtown Park 50 Yard Race ===
In January 1902, there was a local running race in what was then Macdonaldtown Park, over 50 yards. The race followed an argument between several men which attracted a crowd of locals to view the race. Although not an official competition, the requirement for qualification was that each competitor must weigh over 17 stone (106 kg) and the race would take place at 3pm the following Saturday. There were 5 competitors. At its completion, the second, third, fourth and fifth place competitors were each given a consolation prize, while the winner received a medal and ham from the local butcher.

=== Dying Cow Stops Game ===
In 1905 a 3rd grade Western Sydney cricket match between St. Silas' Institution and Lyndhurst was interrupted when a stray cow wandered onto the field and died on the wicket. The game had to be abandoned with the outcome of the match to be determined at the end of the season. The appearance of a cow was not uncommon at this time: it was estimated that Macdonaldtown farmers owned more than 100 cows.

=== Stolen Ground ===
Before their move in 1954, Erskineville Oval was the home ground of the Newtown Jets. In 1950, a number of squares from the ground's surface were mysteriously cut out of the oval and removed. It was later revealed that a local school boy, Warren Allen, had been removing the parts of the oval every day after school. He carried each square of turf from the oval to a local unused hard earth tennis court. There, he replanted and watered the grass, creating a backyard football pitch he and his friends could use.
