= Mascot Juniors =

Australian semi-pro rugby league club, based in Mascot, NSW

Mascot
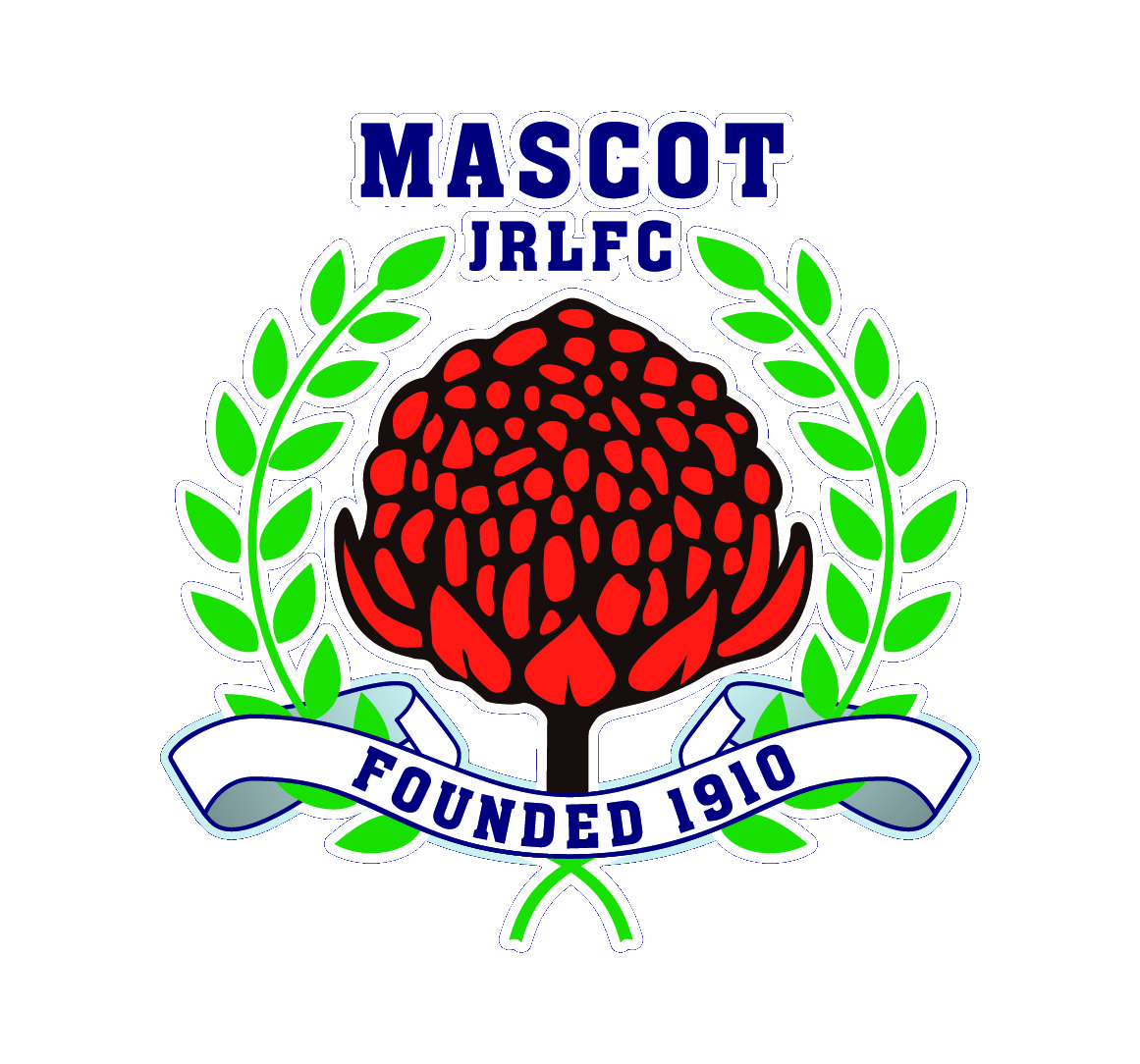

Club information
- Full name: Mascot Juniors Rugby League Football Club
- Founded: 1910; 115 years ago

Current details
- Ground(s): Mascot Oval
- Competition: Sydney Combined Competition, South Sydney District Junior Rugby Football League

The Mascot Juniors was founded in 1910 Mascot JRLFC are an Australian semi-professional rugby league football team based in Mascot, New South Wales, a suburb of eastern Sydney. They are widely acknowledged as the oldest Junior League Club in Australia they play in the South Sydney District Junior Rugby Football League.

== Notable Juniors ==
- Alf O'Connor (1922–29 South Sydney Rabbitohs)
- George Treweek (1926–34 South Sydney Rabbitohs)
- Frank O'Connor (1927–37 South Sydney Rabbitohs)
- Percy Williams (1931–41 South Sydney Rabbitohs & Newtown Jets)
- Eric Lewis (1932–37 South Sydney Rabbitohs)
- Brian Hambly (1956–67 South Sydney Rabbitohs & Parramatta Eels)
- Brian Moore (1962–73 Newtown Jets)
- George Piggins (1967–78 South Sydney Rabbitohs)
- Mario Fenech (1981–95 South Sydney Rabbitohs, North Sydney Bears & South Queensland Crushers)
- Darren Brown (1987–98 South Sydney Rabbitohs, Canterbury-Bankstown Bulldogs, Western Suburbs Magpies, Penrith Panthers, Salford Red Devils & Trafford Borough)
- Tony Rampling (1981–92 South Sydney Rabbitohs, Eastern Suburbs Roosters & Gold Coast Giants)
- Joe Thomas (1984–94 South Sydney Rabbitohs & Canterbury Bulldogs)
- Ian Roberts (1986–98 South Sydney Rabbitohs, Manly Sea Eagles & North Queensland Cowboys)
- Scott Wilson (1988–99 South Sydney Rabbitohs & Canterbury Bulldogs)
- Luke Isakka (2001–02 Wests Tigers)
- Filimone Lolohea (2002–06 South Sydney Rabbitohs & London Broncos)
- Keith Galloway (2003 Cronulla Sharks, Wests Tigers and Leeds Rhinos)
- John Sutton (2004– South Sydney Rabbitohs)
- Manase Manuokafoa (2005–16 South Sydney Rabbitohs, North Queensland Cowboys, Parramatta Eels)
- Fetuli Talanoa (2006– South Sydney Rabbitohs & Hull F.C.)
- Eddie Paea (2006–08 South Sydney Rabbitohs)
- Eddy Pettybourne (2007– South Sydney Rabbitohs, Wests Tigers & Gold Coast Titans)
- Sam Huihahau (2008–11 South Sydney Rabbitohs & Wests Tigers)
- Beau Falloon (2008–16 South Sydney Rabbitohs, Gold Coast Titans & Leeds Rhinos)
- Sione Tovo (2009 Newcastle Knights)
- Mark Khierallah (2011–13 Sydney Roosters & Toulouse Olympique)
- Dylan Walker (2013– South Sydney Rabbitohs & Manly Sea Eagles)
- Patrice Siolo (2014– South Sydney Rabbitohs & Cronulla Sharks)
- Asipeli Fine (2014– Wests Tigers)
- Aaron Gray (2015– South Sydney Rabbitohs)
- Addin Fonua-Blake (2016– Manly Sea Eagles)
- Reimis Smith (2016– Canterbury Bulldogs)
- Siosifa Talakai (2016– South Sydney Rabbitohs)
- Cameron Murray (2017– South Sydney Rabbitohs)
- Emre Guler (2018 Canberra Raiders)
- Billy Magoulias (2019 Cronulla Sharks)
- Keaon Koloamatangi (2020– South Sydney Rabbitohs)

== See also ==
- List of rugby league clubs in Australia
- List of senior rugby league clubs in New South Wales
