= South Eastern Seagulls =

Australian rugby league football club based in Sydney, NSW

Club information
- Full name: South Eastern Seagulls Rugby League Football Club
- Nickname(s): Seagulls, Souths, Easts
- Colours: Green; Red
- Founded: 1957

Current details
- Ground: Pioneers Park, Malabar
- Competition: Sydney Combined Competition; South Sydney District Junior Rugby Football League

The South Eastern Seagulls is an Australian rugby league football club based in Sydney. It was formed in 1957 and currently field male and female teams in all junior grades of the Sydney Combined Competition and South Sydney District Junior Rugby Football League. The club is based at Pioneers Park, Malabar.

== Notable players ==
- Beau Champion (2005–15 South Sydney Rabbitohs, Melbourne Storm, Gold Coast Titans & Parramatta Eels)
- Shannan McPherson (2005–14 South Sydney Rabbitohs & Salford Red Devils)
- Brett Lane (2012 Canterbury-Bankstown Bulldogs)
- Shaun Lane (2015– Canterbury-Bankstown Bulldogs & New Zealand Warriors)
- Connor Watson (2016– Sydney Roosters)
- Nat Butcher (2016– Sydney Roosters)
- Toby Rudolf (2020– Cronulla-Sutherland Sharks)
- Bronson Garlick (2023- Melbourne Storm)
- Egan Butcher (2020- Sydney Roosters)

== See also ==
- List of rugby league clubs in Australia
- List of senior rugby league clubs in New South Wales
