= Fred Briggs (rugby league) =

Australian rugby league footballer

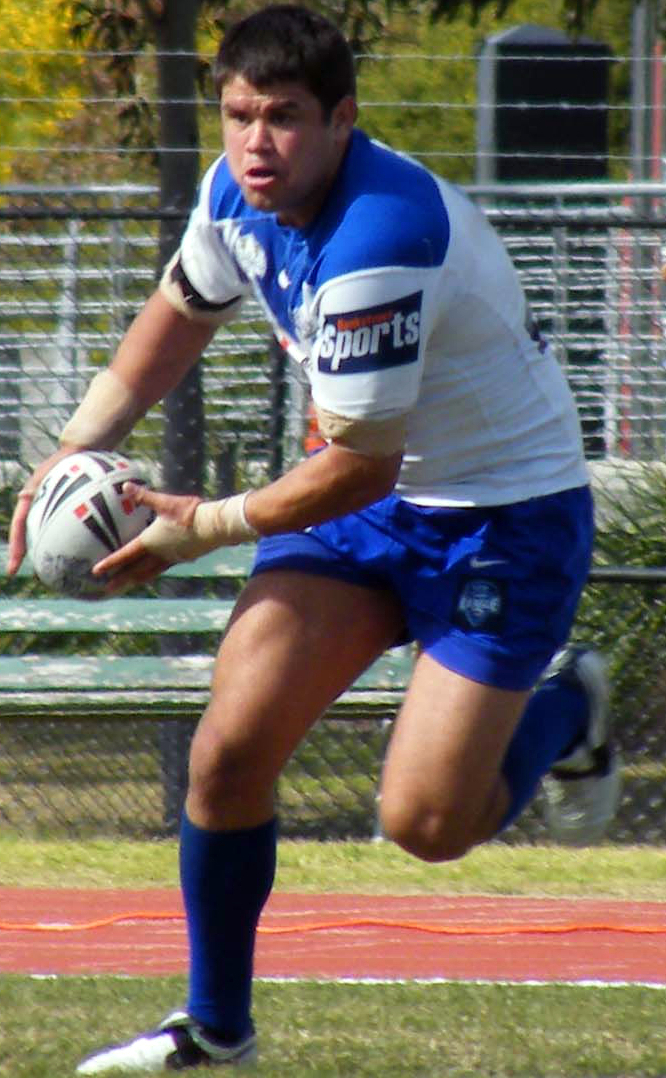

Personal information
- Full name: Fred Briggs
- Born: 3 February 1980 (age 46) Sydney, New South Wales, Australia

Playing information
- Height: 183 cm (6 ft 0 in)
- Weight: 103 kg (16 st 3 lb)
- Position: Prop
Club
Years	Team	Pld	T	G	FG	P
2007–08	Canterbury-Bankstown	17	0	0	0	0

Fred Briggs (born 3 February 1980) is a former rugby league footballer who played as a prop in the 2000s for the Canterbury-Bankstown Bulldogs in the NRL.

== Early life ==
Briggs was born in La Perouse, New South Wales, Australia. He was a student at Matraville Sports High School, he grew up in La Perouse.

Briggs was originally graded into the Souths Flegg Cup team in 2000 from the La Perouse United club and played in the Premier League with Souths when they returned to the NRL in 2002. After not playing grade in 2003, Briggs played for Souths Juniors in the Jim Beam Cup in 2004. Briggs then joined the Sydney Bulls in the Jim Beam Cup for 2006. Briggs received an opportunity to play in the Canterbury Premier League team for the last match of the 2006 season against Penrith, when the club was short of players due to injury.

== Playing career ==
Briggs made his debut for Canterbury against the Gold Coast Titans in Round 19 of the NRL season on 20 July 2007 due to injuries for Willie Mason, Mark O'Meley, Kane Cleal and Aaron Wheatley. In 2008, Briggs joined South Sydney before returning to Canterbury.
