= South Sydney District Junior Rugby Football League =

Junior sports league in New South Wales, Australia

South Sydney District Rugby Football League
- Current season or competition: 2018 South Sydney District Rugby Football League
- Sport: Rugby league
- Number of teams: 14
- Region: Inner Southern Suburbs, South-Eastern Suburbs (New South Wales Rugby League)
- Premiers: South Eastern Seagulls (2026 South Sydney District Rugby Football League season)
- Most titles: Coogee Randwick Wombats (14 titles)
- Website: southsjuniors.leaguenet.com.au
- Related competition: Sydney Combined Competition

The South Sydney District Junior Rugby Football League is an affiliation of junior clubs in the South Sydney area.

== History ==
When the South Sydney Rabbitohs first entered the NSWRL competition as South Sydney in 1908, Souths would become neighbours to fellow city counterpart, the Eastern Suburbs Roosters. Anzac Parade separated the territories for both inner-Sydney clubs when the boundaries were first established the previous year. Souths' boundaries were based on the municipalities of Redfern, Botany, Alexandria, Mascot and Waterloo, while the Roosters' boundaries were those of the eastern municipalities of Paddington, Woollahra, Vaucluse and Waverley.

The new junior league boundaries set out in the early 1950s would take territory away from the Roosters, and hand it over to rival neighbouring club South Sydney.

In the mid-20th century, the southern half of Roosters territory within the Randwick local government area was handed to South Sydney. The NSWRL made this change to 'even the competition' as South Sydney's original heartland, around Redfern and Waterloo, had rapidly industrialised and de-populated. Rabbitohs stalwart S.G. Ball was a dual administrator within South Sydney Rabbitohs and the New South Wales Rugby League at the time. The Rabbitohs were in a highly successful period and had established South Sydney Juniors Rugby League Club in Kingsford, Roosters territory in recent times.

Debate still continues amongst rival fans as to how and why Eastern Suburbs territory, comprising suburbs with junior league clubs rich in talent and numbers in the Randwick and Coogee areas, was given to South Sydney. The Roosters expressed disappointment at losing some of its junior clubs, but the NSWRL would not waver.

This was not to be the end of struggle for junior territory between the two inner-city clubs. In the 1980s, some junior clubs such as Paddington Colts that were within Roosters territory became dissatisfied with Roosters management and affiliated with South Sydney.

After the Newtown Jets were expelled from the NSWRL in 1983, their junior district was eventually absorbed into the South Sydney junior district in 1987. With the tide having turned compared to the situation decades earlier, and the Roosters having a much smaller junior League than South Sydney, Eastern Suburbs at this time then made unsuccessful attempts to regain the suburbs on the same grounds used to hand the southern parts of Coogee and Randwick from Easts to Souths, that of providing an 'even competition'. The NSWRL, controlled at the time by a Board with a ruling faction of representatives from South Sydney (Terry Parker), Balmain (Keith Barnes), Canterbury (Peter Moore) and Manly (Ken Arthurson), refused to redraw the boundaries.

== Current District Clubs ==
Club	Home Ground	Premierships
Alexandria Rovers	Erskineville Oval	8 (1951, 1954, 1962, 1965, 1969, 1975, 1990, 2024)
Botany Rams	Booralee Park	1 (1947)
Coogee Dolphins	Kensington Oval	3 (2004, 2007, 2008)
Coogee Randwick Wombats	Coogee Oval	14 (1956, 1970*, 1973, 1978, 1982, 1983, 1992, 1993, 1994, 1996, 2009, 2010, 2011, 2019)
La Perouse United	Yarra Reserve	9 (1963, 1964*, 1970*, 1991, 2000, 2001, 2002, 2005, 2025)
Maroubra Lions	Snape Park	1 (1979)
Marrickville RSL Kings	Marrickville Oval	1 (1995)
Mascot Juniors	Mascot Oval	7 (1952, 1953, 1955, 1984, 1985, 1989, 1998)
Matraville Tigers	Heffron Park	1 (2022)
Moore Park Broncos		12 (1961, 1964*, 1971, 1977, 1980, 1997, 1999, 2003, 2006, 2012, 2013, 2014)
Newtown Jnr Jets	Tempe Reserve	2003
Redfern All Blacks	Waterloo Oval	7 (1974, 1987*, 2015, 2016, 2017, 2018, 2023)
Saints JRLFC	Kensington Oval, Kensington	0
South Eastern Seagulls	Pioneers Park, Malabar	1 (2026)
South Sydney Mustangs	Rowland Park, Daceyville	0
Waterloo Waratahs		1 (1988)

- Asterisks indicates years where premierships were shared between two teams.

=== 2023 A Grade Clubs ===
Club	Moniker	Suburb	A Grade	A Reserve
Alexandria Rovers	Rovers	Alexandria, New South Wales	No	Yes
Coogee	Dolphins	Coogee, New South Wales	Yes	Yes
Coogee Randwick	Wombats	Coogee, New South Wales	No	Yes
La Perouse United	Panthers	La Perouse, New South Wales	Yes	Yes
Mascot Juniors	Jets	Mascot, New South Wales	Yes	Yes
Marrickville RSL	Kings	Marrickville, New South Wales	No	Yes
Matraville	Tigers	Matraville, New South Wales	Yes	Yes
Moore Park	Broncos	Moore Park, New South Wales	No	Yes
Redfern All Blacks	All Blacks	Redfern, New South Wales	Yes	Yes
South Eastern	Seagulls	Malabar, New South Wales	Yes	Yes

== A Grade Premierships ==
Season	Grand Final Information			Minor Premiers
Season	Premiers	Score	Runners-Up	Minor Premiers
1947	Botany United
1948	South Sydney Fernleighs
1949	South Sydney Fernleighs
1950	South Sydney Fernleighs
1951	Alexandria Rovers		Redfern All Blacks
1952	Mascot Juniors		Alexandria Rovers	Mascot Juniors
1953	Mascot Juniors		Brothers	Mascot Juniors
1954	Alexandria Rovers		South Sydney Fernleighs
1955	Mascot Juniors
1956	Coogee Randwick Wombats
1957	South Sydney Fernleighs
1958	Chelsea Eagles
1959	Chelsea Eagles
1960	Kensington United
1961	Moore Park Broncos
1962	Alexandria Rovers
1963	La Perouse United
1964	Moore Park Broncos / La Perouse United
1965	Alexandria Rovers
1966	Kensington United
1967	South Sydney Fernleighs
1968	Kensington United
1969	Alexandria Rovers
1970	La Perouse United / Coogee Randwick Wombats
1971	Moore Park Broncos
1972	Zetland Magpies
1973	Coogee Randwick Wombats
1974	Redfern All Blacks
1975	Alexandria Rovers
1976	Chelsea Eagles
1977	Moore Park Broncos
1978	Coogee Randwick Wombats
1979	Maroubra Lions
1980	Moore Park Broncos
1981	Zetland Magpies
1982	Coogee Randwick Wombats
1983	Coogee Randwick Wombats
1984	Mascot Juniors
1985	Mascot Juniors
1986	Chelsea Eagles
1987	Redfern All Blacks / Kensington United
1988	Waterloo Waratahs
1989	Mascot Juniors
1990	Alexandria Rovers
1991	La Perouse United
1992	Coogee Randwick Wombats
1993	Coogee Randwick Wombats
1994	Coogee Randwick Wombats
1995	Marrickville Kings
1996	Coogee Randwick Wombats
1997	Moore Park Broncos
1998	Mascot Juniors
1999	Moore Park Broncos
2000	La Perouse United
2001	La Perouse United
2002	La Perouse United
2003	Moore Park Broncos
2004	Coogee Dolphins
2005	La Perouse United
2006	Moore Park Broncos
2007	Coogee Dolphins
2008	Coogee Dolphins
2009	Coogee Randwick Wombats
2010	Coogee Randwick Wombats
2011	Coogee Randwick Wombats
2012	Moore Park Broncos	20 – 8	Coogee Randwick Wombats	La Perouse United
2013	Moore Park Broncos
2014	Moore Park Broncos	16 – 12	Mascot Juniors
2015	Redfern All Blacks	42 – 24	Coogee Randwick Wombats	Coogee Randwick Wombats
2016	Redfern All Blacks	28 – 16	Coogee Randwick Wombats	Coogee Randwick Wombats
2017	Redfern All Blacks	16 – 12	Coogee Randwick Wombats	Moore Park Broncos
2018	Redfern All Blacks	28 – 12	Mascot Juniors	Coogee Randwick Wombats
2019	Coogee Randwick Wombats	32 – 0	South Eastern Seagulls	South Eastern Seagulls
2020	Season cancelled due to COVID-19.
2021	Season was suspended after COVID-19 breakout.
2022	Matraville	20 – 18	South Eastern Seagulls	South Eastern Seagulls
2023	Redfern All Blacks	20 – 18	Matraville	Matraville
2024	Alexandria Rovers	34 – 26	Coogee Randwick Wombats	Alexandria Rovers
2025	La Perouse United	14 – 8	Coogee Randwick Wombats	La Perouse United
2026	South Eastern Seagulls	28 – 0	Coogee Dolphins	Coogee Dolphins

== A Reserve Premierships ==
Season	Grand Final Information			Minor Premiers
Season	Premiers	Score	Runners-Up	Minor Premiers
2015	Bondi United	20 – 18	South Eastern Seagulls	Bondi United
2016	Bondi United	22 – 20	Coogee Dolphins	Bondi United
2017	Coogee Dolphins	28 – 18	La Perouse United	La Perouse United
2018	Mascot Juniors	20 – 18	La Perouse United	Mascot Juniors
2019	South Sydney Mustangs	10 – 8	South Eastern Seagulls	South Sydney Mustangs
2020	Season cancelled due to COVID-19.
2021	Season was suspended after COVID-19 breakout.
2022	Marrickville RSL	16 – 12	South Eastern Seagulls	South Eastern Seagulls
2023	Alexandria Rovers	26 – 22	Redfern All Blacks	La Perouse United
2024	Mascot Juniors	16 – 12	Redfern All Blacks	Alexandria Rovers
2025	Mascot Juniors	22 – 16	Alexandria Rovers	Mascot Juniors
2026	Alexandria Rovers	24 – 10	Coogee Dolphins	Coogee Dolphins

== Team of the Century ==
On 16 May 2008, the South Sydney Juniors Team of the Century was named at the Centenary Ball.

1. Eric Simms (La Perouse United)
2. Harold Holder (Kinkora Juniors)
3. Paul Sait (Matraville Tigers)
4. Ray Branighan (Moore Park)
5. Benny Wearing (Redfern Ioanas)
6. Greg Hawick (Alexandria Rovers)
7. Clem Kennedy (Cleveland Street)
8. Brian Hambly (Mascot Jets)
9. George Piggins (Mascot Jets)
10. Ian Roberts (Mascot Jets)
11. Bob McCarthy (Moore Park)
12. George Treweek (Mascot Jets)
13. Ron Coote (c) (Kensington United)
14. Terry Hill (Zetland Magpies)
15. Craig Wing (Maroubra Lions)
16. Craig Coleman (Waterloo Waratahs)
17. Gary Stevens (Chelsea United)

Coach: Alf Blair (Waterloo Albions)

== See also ==
- Balmain District Junior Rugby League
- Cronulla-Sutherland District Rugby Football League
- Manly-Warringah/North Sydney District Rugby League
- Parramatta Junior Rugby League
- Penrith District Rugby League
- Sydney Roosters Juniors
- Rugby League Competitions in Australia
