= List of rugby league clubs in Australia =

This is a list of current rugby league clubs in Australia.

== Australian Capital Territory ==
=== Greater Western & Bidgee Men's Clubs ===
Colours	Club	Competition	Home Venue	City/Suburb	Est
Tier 1 Clubs (National)
	Canberra Raiders	National Rugby League	GIO Stadium	Canberra (Bruce)	1981
Tier 2 Clubs (State Level)
	Monaro Colts	Men's Country Championships	NSWRL HQ Bruce	Canberra (Bruce)	
Tier 4 Clubs (First Grade)
	Belconnen United Sharks	Canberra Raiders Cup	NSWRL HQ Bruce	Canberra (Bruce)	2016
	Gungahlin Bulls	Canberra Raiders Cup	Gungahlin Enclosed Oval	Canberra (Gungahlin)	1994
	Tuggeranong Valley Bushrangers	Canberra Raiders Cup	Greenway Oval	Canberra (Greenway)	2003
	West Belconnen Warriors	Canberra Raiders Cup	Raiders Belconnen	Canberra (Holt)	1975
	Woden Valley Rams	Canberra Raiders Cup	Phillip Oval	Canberra (Phillip)	1967
Tier 5 Clubs (Second Division)
	North Canberra Bears	George Tooke Shield	Kaleen Enclosed Oval	Canberra (Kaleen)	1971
	University of Canberra Stars	George Tooke Shield	Raiders Belconnen	Canberra (Holt)	2010

=== Greater Western & Bidgee Women's Clubs ===
Colours	Club	Competition	Home Venue	City/Suburb	Est
Tier 1 Clubs (National)
	Canberra Raiders	NRL Women's Premiership	GIO Stadium	Canberra (Bruce)	1981
Tier 2 Clubs (State Level)
	Monaro Colts	Women's Country Championships	NSWRL HQ Bruce	Canberra (Bruce)	
Tier 3 Clubs (First Grade)
	Belconnen United Sharks	Katrina Fanning Shield	NSWRL HQ Bruce	Canberra (Bruce)	2016
	Gungahlin Bulls	Katrina Fanning Shield	Gungahlin Enclosed Oval	Canberra (Gungahlin)	1994
	Tuggeranong Valley Bushrangers	Katrina Fanning Shield	Greenway Oval	Canberra (Greenway)	2003
	West Belconnen Warriors	Katrina Fanning Shield	Raiders Belconnen	Canberra (Holt)	1975
	Woden Valley Rams	Katrina Fanning Shield	Phillip Oval	Canberra (Phillip)	1967

== New South Wales ==
=== Central Sydney & Macarthur Men's Clubs ===
Colours	Club	Competition	Home Venue	City/Suburb	Est
Tier 1 Clubs (National)
	Canterbury-Bankstown Bulldogs	National Rugby League	Accor Stadium	Sydney (Sydney Olympic Park)	1935
	Manly Warringah Sea Eagles	National Rugby League	4 Pines Park	Sydney (Brookvale)	1947
	Parramatta Eels	National Rugby League	CommBank Stadium	Sydney (Parramatta)	1947
	South Sydney Rabbitohs	National Rugby League	Accor Stadium	Sydney (Sydney Olympic Park)	1908
	Sydney Roosters	National Rugby League	Allianz Stadium	Sydney (Moore Park)	1908
	Wests Tigers	National Rugby League	Campbelltown Sports Stadium	Sydney (Leumeah)	2000
Tier 2 Clubs (State Level)
	Macarthur-Wests Tigers	Men's Country Championships	Kirkham Oval	Sydney (Elderslie)	2018
	Newtown Jets	New South Wales Cup	Henson Park	Sydney (Marrickville)	1908
	North Sydney Bears	New South Wales Cup	North Sydney Oval	Sydney (North Sydney)	1908
	Western Suburbs Magpies	New South Wales Cup	Lidcombe Oval	Sydney (Lidcombe)	1908
Tier 3 Clubs (Major Competitions)
	Cabramatta Two Blues	Ron Massey Cup	New Era Stadium	Sydney (Cabramatta)	1919
	Glebe Dirty Reds	Ron Massey Cup	Wentworth Park	Sydney (Glebe)	1908
	Hills District Bulls	Ron Massey Cup	Crestwood Reserve	Sydney (Baulkham Hills)	1964
	Moorebank Rams	Sydney Shield	Hammondville Oval	Sydney (Moorebank)	1955
	Mount Pritchard Mounties	Ron Massey Cup	Aubrey Keech Reserve	Sydney (Hinchinbrook)	1927
	Ryde-Eastwood Hawks	Ron Massey Cup	TG Milner Field	Sydney (Marsfield)	1963
	Wentworthville Magpies	Ron Massey Cup	Ringrose Park	Sydney (Wentworthville)	1937
Tier 4 Clubs (First Grade)
	Alexandria Rovers	South Sydney Premiership	Erskineville Oval	Sydney (Erskineville)	1948
	Asquith Magpies	Northern Sydney Gold	Storey Park	Sydney (Hornsby)	1953
	Avalon Bulldogs	Northern Sydney Gold	Hitchcock Park	Sydney (Avalon Beach)	1962
	Belrose Eagles	Northern Sydney Gold	Lionel Watts Park	Sydney (Belrose)	1955
	Camden Rams	Macarthur Premiership	Kirkham Oval	Sydney (Elderslie)	1910
	Campbelltown Collegians	Macarthur Premiership	Bradbury Oval	Sydney (Bradbury)	1969
	Campbelltown City Kangaroos	Macarthur Premiership	Fullwood Reserve	Sydney (Claymore)	1908
	Cromer Kingfishers	Northern Sydney Gold	St Matthews Farm Reserve	Sydney (Cromer)	1969
	Coogee Dolphins	South Sydney Premiership	Kensington Oval	Sydney (Kensington)	1993
	Coogee-Randwick Wombats	South Sydney Premiership	Marcellin Fields	Sydney (Maroubra)	1953
	East Campbelltown Eagles	Macarthur Premiership	Waminda Oval	Sydney (Campbelltown)	1961
	Forestville Ferrets	Northern Sydney Gold	Forestville Oval	Sydney (Forestville)	1967
	Guildford Owls	Parramatta Gold	McCredie Park	Sydney (Guildford)	1953
	La Perouse Panthers	South Sydney Premiership	Yarra Oval	Sydney (Phillip Bay)	1968
	Marrickville RSL Kings	South Sydney Premiership	Marrickville Oval	Sydney (Marrickville)	1996
	Mascot Jets	South Sydney Premiership	Mascot Oval	Sydney (Mascot)	1910
	Mittagong Lions	Macarthur Premiership	Mittagong Showground	Mittagong	1914
	Mona Vale Raiders	Northern Sydney Gold	Newport Park	Sydney (Newport)	1964
	Narellan Jets	Macarthur Premiership	Narellan Sports Ground	Sydney (Narellan)	1977
	Narrabeen Sharks	Northern Sydney Gold	Lake Park	Sydney (North Narrabeen)	1932
	Narraweena Hawks	Northern Sydney Gold	Beverley Job Oval	Sydney (Narraweena)	1953
	Oakdale Workers Bears	Macarthur Premiership	Sid Sharpe Memorial Oval	Oakdale	1963
	Picton Magpies	Macarthur Premiership	Victoria Park	Picton	1908
	Redfern All Blacks	South Sydney Premiership	Redfern Oval	Sydney (Redfern)	1944
	South Eastern Seagulls	South Sydney Premiership	Pioneers Park	Sydney (Malabar)	1957
	South West Goannas	Macarthur Premiership	Onslow Oval	Sydney (Camden)	2020
	The Oaks Tigers	Macarthur Premiership	Dudley Chesham Sports Ground	The Oaks	1966
	Thirlmere-Tahmoor Roosters	Macarthur Premiership	Thirlmere Sports Ground	Thirlmere	1976
Tier 5 Clubs (Second Division)
	All Saints-Toongabbie Tigers	Metro Sydney Silver	C.V Kelly Park	Sydney (Girraween)	2005
	Appin Dogs	Macarthur Second Division	Appin Park	Appin	1953
	Bargo Bunnies	Macarthur Second Division	Bargo Sports Ground	Bargo	1929
	Berowra Wallabies	Metro Sydney Bronze	Warrina Street Oval	Sydney (Berowra Heights)	1967
	Bondi United	Metro Sydney Silver	Waverley Oval	Sydney (Bondi Junction)	1946
	Campbelltown Warriors	Macarthur Second Division	Worrell Park	Sydney (Ruse)	1969
	Chipping Norton Kangaroos	Macarthur Second Division	Childs Park	Sydney (Chipping Norton)	1983
	Concord-Burwood Wolves	Metro Sydney Bronze	Goddard Park	Sydney (Concord)	2001
	Dundas Shamrocks	Metro Sydney Bronze	St Patrick's Marist College Oval	Sydney (Dundas)	1960
	East Hills Bulldogs	Macarthur Second Division	Smith Park	Sydney (East Hills)	1965
	Eagle Vale-St Andrews Magpies	Macarthur Second Division	Eschol Park Oval	Sydney (Eschol Park)	1968
	Glenquarie All Stars	Macarthur Second Division	Seddon Park	Sydney (Glenfield)	
	Greenacre Tigers	Macarthur Second Division	Roberts Park	Sydney (Greenacre)	1961
	Greystanes Devils	Metro Sydney Silver	Darling Street Park	Sydney (Greystanes)	1979
	Harbord United Devils	Metro Sydney Bronze	Harbord Park	Sydney (Freshwater)	1950
	Kellyville Bushrangers	Metro Sydney Silver	Kellyville Park	Sydney (Kellyville)	1996
	Leichhardt Wanderers	Metro Sydney Bronze	Blackmore Oval	Sydney (Leichhardt)	1911
	Liverpool Catholic Club Raiders	Macarthur Second Division	Hillier Oval	Sydney (Liverpool)	1979
	Marconi Mustangs	Metro Sydney Silver	Marconi Park	Sydney (Bossley Park)	2006
	Merrylands Rams	Metro Sydney Silver	Merrylands Oval	Sydney (Merrylands)	1922
	Moore Park Broncos	South Sydney Reserve Grade	Marrickville Oval	Sydney (Marrickville)	1958
	Mount Annan-Currans Hill Knights	Macarthur Second Division	Jack Nash Oval	Sydney (Currans Hill)	1995
	Oran Park-Gregory Hills Chargers	Macarthur Second Division	Jack Brabham Reserve	Sydney (Oran Park)	2014
	Pennant Hills-Cherrybrook Stags	Metro Sydney Bronze	Greenway Oval	Sydney (Cherrybrook)	1967
	Sydney University Lions	Metro Sydney Bronze	University Oval	Sydney (Camperdown)	1910
	TAFE New South Wales Polecats	Metro Sydney Bronze	Kellyville Park	Sydney (Kellyville)	1971
	Warragamba Wombats	Macarthur Second Division	Warragamba Sportsground	Warragamba	1986
	Willoughby Roos	Metro Sydney Bronze	Willoughby Park	Sydney (Willoughby East)	1913

=== Central Sydney & Macarthur Women's Clubs ===
Colours	Club	Competition	Home Venue	City/Suburb	Est
Tier 1 Clubs (National)
	Canterbury-Bankstown Bulldogs	NRL Women's Premiership	Accor Stadium	Sydney (Sydney Olympic Park)	1935
	Parramatta Eels	NRL Women's Premiership	CommBank Stadium	Sydney (Parramatta)	1947
	Sydney Roosters	NRL Women's Premiership	Allianz Stadium	Sydney (Moore Park)	1908
	Wests Tigers	NRL Women's Premiership	Campbelltown Sports Stadium	Sydney (Leumeah)	2000
Tier 2 Clubs (State Level)
	Mount Pritchard Mounties	NSWRL Women's Premiership	Aubrey Keech Reserve	Sydney (Hinchinbrook)	1927
	South Sydney Rabbitohs	NSWRL Women's Premiership	Redfern Oval	Sydney (Redfern)	1908
	Wentworthville Magpies	NSWRL Women's Premiership	Ringrose Park	Sydney (Wentworthville)	1937
Tier 3 Clubs (First Grade)
	Cabramatta Two Blues	Combined Sydney Gold	New Era Stadium	Sydney (Cabramatta)	1919
	Chipping Norton Kangaroos	Combined Sydney Gold	Childs Park	Sydney (Chipping Norton)	1983
	Forestville Ferrets	Combined Sydney Gold	Forestville Oval	Sydney (Forestville)	1967
	Leichhardt Wanderers	Combined Sydney Gold	Blackmore Oval	Sydney (Leichhardt)	1911
	Marrickville RSL Kings	Combined Sydney Gold	Marrickville Oval	Sydney (Marrickville)	1996
	Mascot Jets	Combined Sydney Gold	Mascot Oval	Sydney (Mascot)	1910
	Milperra Colts	Combined Sydney Gold	Killara Reserve	Sydney (Panania)	1970
	Pennant Hills-Cherrybrook Stags	Combined Sydney Gold	Greenway Oval	Sydney (Cherrybrook)	1967
	Redfern All Blacks	Combined Sydney Gold	Redfern Oval	Sydney (Redfern)	1944
Tier 4 Clubs (Second Division)
	All Saints-Toongabbie Tigers	Combined Sydney Silver	C.V Kelly Park	Sydney (Girraween)	2005
	Hills District Bulls	Combined Sydney Silver	Crestwood Reserve	Sydney (Baulkham Hills)	1964
	Lalor Park Kookas	Combined Sydney Silver	Cavanagh Reserve	Sydney (Lalor Park)	1959

=== Greater Northern Men's Clubs ===
Colours	Club	Competition	Home Venue	City/Suburb	Est
Tier 2 Clubs (State Level)
	Greater Northern Tigers	Men's Country Championships	Pirtek Park	Singleton	
	Northern Rivers Titans	Men's Country Championships	Jack Woolaston Oval	Tamworth	
	North Coast Bulldogs	Men's Country Championships	Geoff King Motors Oval	Coffs Harbour (Toormina)	
	Tweed Heads Seagulls	Queensland Cup	Seagulls Sporting Complex	Tweed Heads (Tweed Heads West)	1909
Tier 4 Clubs (First Grade)
	Aberdeen Tigers	Group 21 Premiership	McKinnon Oval	Aberdeen	1920
	Ballina Seagulls	Northern Rivers Regional Rugby League Premiership	Kingsford Smith Park	Ballina	1920
	Bilambil Jets	Northern Rivers Regional Rugby League Premiership	Bilambil East Sports Field	Bilambil	1923
	Boggabri Kangaroos	Group 4 Premiership	Jubilee Oval	Boggabri	1916
	Byron Bay Red Devils	Northern Rivers Regional Rugby League Premiership	Red Devil Park	Byron Bay	1974
	Casino RSM Cougars	Northern Rivers Regional Rugby League Premiership	Queen Elizabeth Park	Casino	1966
	Coffs Harbour Comets	Group 2 Premiership	Geoff King Motors Oval	Coffs Harbour (Toormina)	1965
	Cudgen Hornets	Northern Rivers Regional Rugby League Premiership	Ned Byrne Oval	Cudgen	1950
	Denman Devils	Group 21 Premiership	Denman Oval	Denman	1923
	Dungowan Cowboys	Group 4 Premiership	Dungowan Recreation Ground	Dungowan	2000
	Evans Head Bombers	Northern Rivers Regional Rugby League Premiership	Stan Payne Oval	Evans Head	1999
	Forster-Tuncurry Hawks	Group 3 Premiership	Harry Elliott Oval	Forster	1921
	Glen Innes Magpies	Group 19 Premiership	Mead Park	Glen Innes	1947
	Grafton Ghosts	Group 2 Premiership	Frank McGuren Field	Grafton (Grafton)	1963
	Greta-Branxton Colts	Group 21 Premiership	Greta Central Oval	Greta	1985
	Gunnedah Bulldogs	Group 4 Premiership	Kitchener Park	Gunnedah	
	Guyra Super Spuds	Group 19 Premiership	Guyra Sporting Complex	Guyra	1922
	Inverell RSM Hawks	Group 19 Premiership	Varley Oval	Inverell	1965
	Kootingal-Moonbi Roosters	Group 4 Premiership	Kootingal Sports Ground	Kootingal	
	Kyogle Turkeys	Northern Rivers Regional Rugby League Premiership	New Park	Kyogle	1960
	Lismore Marist Brothers Rams	Northern Rivers Regional Rugby League Premiership	Crozier Field	Lismore (Lismore)	1912
	Lower Clarence Magpies	Northern Rivers Regional Rugby League Premiership	Yamba Sporting Complex	Yamba	1915
	Macksville Sea Eagles	Group 2 Premiership	Allan Gillett Oval	Macksville	
	Macleay Valley Mustangs	Group 3 Premiership	Verge St Oval	Kempsey	1995
	Moree Boomerangs	Group 19 Premiership	Moree Services Club Oval	Moree	1925
	Moree Boars	Group 4 Premiership	Boughton Oval	Moree	1918
	Mullumbimby Giants	Northern Rivers Regional Rugby League Premiership	Mullumbimby Oval	Mullumbimby	1909
	Murwillumbah Mustangs	Northern Rivers Regional Rugby League Premiership	Murwillumbah Oval	Murwillumbah	1989
	Muswellbrook Rams	Group 21 Premiership	Olympic Park	Muswellbrook	
	Nambucca Heads Roosters	Group 2 Premiership	Coronation Park	Nambucca Heads	1982
	Narwan Eels	Group 19 Premiership	Newling Oval	Armidale	1976
	Northern United Dirawongs	Northern Rivers Regional Rugby League Premiership	Crozier Field	Lismore (Lismore)	
	North Tamworth Bears	Group 4 Premiership	Jack Woolaston Oval	Tamworth	1911
	Old Bar Beach Pirates	Group 3 Premiership	Old Bar Sporting Fields	Old Bar	1979
	Port City Breakers	Group 3 Premiership	Port Regional Stadium	Port Macquarie	2002
	Port Macquarie Sharks	Group 3 Premiership	Port Regional Stadium	Port Macquarie	1940
	Sawtell Panthers	Group 2 Premiership	Rex Hardaker Oval	Coffs Harbour (Sawtell)	
	Scone Thoroughbreds	Group 21 Premiership	Scone Park	Scone	
	Singleton Greyhounds	Group 21 Premiership	Pirtek Park	Singleton	1920
	South Grafton Rebels	Group 2 Premiership	McKittrick Park	Grafton (South Grafton)	1915
	Taree City Bulls	Group 3 Premiership	Jack Neal Oval	Taree	1998
	Tingha Tigers	Group 19 Premiership	Tingha Sport and Recreation Ground	Tingha	1928
	Tweed Coast Raiders	Northern Rivers Regional Rugby League Premiership	Les Burger Field	Bogangar	1980
	Uralla Tigers	Group 19 Premiership	Uralla Sporting Complex	Uralla	1968
	Walcha Roos	Group 19 Premiership	Peter Fenwicke Oval	Walcha	
	Warialda Wombats	Group 19 Premiership	Warialda Recreation Ground	Warialda	
	Wauchope Blues	Group 3 Premiership	Lank Bain Sporting Complex	Wauchope (Yippin Creek)	1891
	Wee Waa Panthers	Group 4 Premiership	Cook Oval	Wee Waa	1980
	Werris Creek Magpies	Group 4 Premiership	David Taylor Oval	Werris Creek	1912
	Wingham District Tigers	Group 3 Premiership	Regional Australia Bank Stadium	Wingham	1921
	Woolgoolga Seahorses	Group 2 Premiership	Solitary Island Sports Field	Woolgoolga	1946
Tier 5 Clubs (Second Division)
	Beechwood Shamrocks	Hastings League	Beechwood Oval	Wauchope (Beechwood)	
	Bellingen Valley-Dorrigo Magpies	Hastings League	Bellingen Park	Bellingen	
	Bowraville Tigers	Hastings League	Bowraville Sports Hub	Bowraville	
	Comboyne Tigers	Hastings League	Comboyne Showground	Comboyne	
	Kendall Blues	Hastings League	Kendall Showground	Kendall	1979
	Lake Cathie Raiders	Hastings League	Lake Cathie Sporting Complex	Lake Cathie	
	Laurieton Hotel Stingrays	Hastings League	Laurieton Oval	Laurieton	2018
	Long Flat Dragons	Hastings League	Long Flat Oval	Long Flat	1925
	Lower Macleay Magpies	Hastings League	Smithtown Oval	Smithtown	
	Merriwa Magpies	Group 21 Reserve Grade	Merriwa Oval	Merriwa	1923
	Murrurundi Mavericks	Group 21 Reserve Grade	Wilson Memorial Oval	Murrurundi	
	Orara Valley Axemen	Hastings League	Coramba Showground	Coramba	
	Quirindi Grasshoppers	Group 21 Reserve Grade	Jock Longfield Oval	Quirindi	
	South West Rocks Marlins	Hastings League	South West Rocks Sports Ground	South West Rocks	2013
	Tenterfield Tigers	Border Rugby League	Tenterfield Rugby League Park	Tenterfield	1918

=== Greater Northern Women's Clubs ===
Colours	Club	Competition	Home Venue	City/Suburb	Est
Tier 2 Clubs (State Level)
	Greater Northern Tigers	Women's Country Championships	Pirtek Park	Singleton	
	Northern Rivers Titans	Women's Country Championships	Jack Woolaston Oval	Tamworth	
	North Coast Bulldogs	Women's Country Championships	Geoff King Motors Oval	Coffs Harbour (Toormina)	
	Tweed Heads Seagulls	QRL Women's Premiership	Seagulls Sporting Complex	Tweed Heads (Tweed Heads West)	1909
Tier 3 Clubs (First Grade)
	Ballina Seagulls	Northern Rivers Regional Rugby League Women's Premiership	Kingsford Smith Park	Ballina	1920
	Bilambil Jets	Northern Rivers Regional Rugby League Women's Premiership	Bilambil East Sports Field	Bilambil	1923
	Boggabri Kangaroos	Group 4 Women's Premiership	Jubilee Oval	Boggabri	1916
	Byron Bay Red Devils	Northern Rivers Regional Rugby League Women's Premiership	Red Devil Park	Byron Bay	1974
	Casino RSM Cougars	Northern Rivers Regional Rugby League Women's Premiership	Queen Elizabeth Park	Casino	1966
	Grafton Ghosts	Group 2 Women's Premiership	Frank McGuren Field	Grafton (Grafton)	1963
	Gunnedah Bulldogs	Group 4 Women's Premiership	Kitchener Park	Gunnedah	
	Kootingal-Moonbi Roosters	Group 4 Women's Premiership	Kootingal Sports Ground	Kootingal	
	Laurieton Hotel Stingrays	Mid North Coast Women's Premiership	Laurieton Oval	Laurieton	2018
	Lower Clarence Magpies	Northern Rivers Regional Rugby League Women's Premiership	Yamba Sporting Complex	Yamba	1915
	Macksville Sea Eagles	Group 2 Women's Premiership	Allan Gillett Oval	Macksville	
	Macleay Valley Mustangs	Mid North Coast Women's Premiership	Verge St Oval	Kempsey	1995
	Merriwa Magpies	Group 21 Women's Premiership	Merriwa Oval	Merriwa	1923
	Moree Boars	Group 4 Women's Premiership	Boughton Oval	Moree	1918
	Muswellbrook Rams	Group 21 Women's Premiership	Olympic Park	Muswellbrook	
	Nambucca Heads Roosters	Group 2 Women's Premiership	Coronation Park	Nambucca Heads	1982
	Northern United Dirawongs	Northern Rivers Regional Rugby League Women's Premiership	Crozier Field	Lismore (Lismore)	
	North Tamworth Bears	Group 4 Women's Premiership	Jack Woolaston Oval	Tamworth	1911
	Old Bar Beach Pirates	Mid North Coast Women's Premiership	Old Bar Sporting Fields	Old Bar	1979
	Port City Breakers	Mid North Coast Women's Premiership	Port Regional Stadium	Port Macquarie	2002
	Port Macquarie Sharks	Mid North Coast Women's Premiership	Port Regional Stadium	Port Macquarie	1940
	Quirindi Grasshoppers	Group 21 Women's Premiership	Jock Longfield Oval	Quirindi	
	Sawtell Panthers	Group 2 Women's Premiership	Rex Hardaker Oval	Coffs Harbour (Sawtell)	
	Singleton Greyhounds	Group 21 Women's Premiership	Pirtek Park	Singleton	1920
	South Grafton Rebels	Group 2 Women's Premiership	McKittrick Park	Grafton (South Grafton)	1915
	Wauchope Blues	Mid North Coast Women's Premiership	Lank Bain Sporting Complex	Wauchope (Yippin Creek)	1891
	Woolgoolga Seahorses	Group 2 Women's Premiership	Solitary Island Sports Field	Woolgoolga	1946
	Wee Waa Panthers	Group 4 Women's Premiership	Cook Oval	Wee Waa	1980

=== Greater Western & Bidgee Men's Clubs ===
Colours	Club	Competition	Home Venue	City/Suburb	Est
Tier 2 Clubs (State Level)
	Riverina Bulls	Men's Country Championships	Geohex Park	Wagga Wagga (East Wagga Wagga)	
	Western Rams	Men's Country Championships	Apex Oval	Dubbo	
Tier 4 Clubs (First Grade)
	Albury Thunder	Group 9 Premiership	Greenfield Park	Albury (Albury)	1934
	Baradine Magpies	Castlereagh League	Baradine Town Oval	Baradine	1922
	Batemans Bay Tigers	Group 16 Premiership	Mackay Park	Batemans Bay	1897
	Bathurst Panthers	Peter McDonald Premiership	Carrington Park	Bathurst (Bathurst)	2000
	Bathurst St Patricks Saints	Peter McDonald Premiership	Jack Arrow Sporting Complex	Bathurst (Kelso)	1943
	Bega Roosters	Group 16 Premiership	Bega Recreation Ground	Bega	1960
	Bombala Blue Heelers	Group 16 Premiership	Bombala Showground	Bombala	1932
	Cobar Roosters	Castlereagh League	Tom Knight Oval	Cobar	1921
	Coolah Kangaroos	Castlereagh League	Bowen Oval	Coolah	
	Cooma United Stallions	Group 16 Premiership	Cooma Showground	Cooma	1973
	Coonabarabran Unicorns	Castlereagh League	Coonabarabran Oval	Coonabarabran	
	Coonamble Bears	Castlereagh League	Coonamble Sports Ground	Coonamble	1914
	Cootamundra Bulldogs	Group 9 Premiership	Les Boyd Oval	Cootamundra	1923
	Darlington Point-Coleambally Roosters	Group 20 Premiership	Darlington Point Sportsground	Darlington Point	1973
	Dubbo CYMS Fishies	Peter McDonald Premiership	Apex Oval	Dubbo	1947
	Dubbo Macquarie Raiders	Peter McDonald Premiership	Apex Oval	Dubbo	1959
	Dunedoo Swans	Castlereagh League	Robertson Park & Recreation Oval	Dunedoo	1910
	Eden Tigers	Group 16 Premiership	George Brown Memorial Sports Ground	Eden	1940
	Forbes Magpies	Peter McDonald Premiership	Spooner Oval	Forbes	1919
	Goulburn City Bulldogs	Canberra Raiders Cup	Workers Arena	Goulburn	2020
	Griffith Black & Whites	Group 20 Premiership	Solar Mad Stadium	Griffith (Griffith)	1954
	Griffith Waratah Tigers	Group 20 Premiership	Griffith Ex Servicemens Club Sports Oval	Griffith (Griffith)	1964
	Gulgong Terriers	Castlereagh League	Billy Dunn Oval	Gulgong	1923
	Gundagai Tigers	Group 9 Premiership	ANZAC Park	Gundagai	1921
	Hay Magpies	Group 20 Premiership	Hay Park Oval	Hay	1931
	Junee Diesels	Group 9 Premiership	Laurie Daley Oval	Junee	1926
	Leeton Galloping Greens	Group 20 Premiership	Leeton No 1 Oval	Leeton	1921
	Lithgow Workies Wolves	Peter McDonald Premiership	Tony Luchetti Sportsground	Lithgow	1957
	Merimbula-Pambula Bulldogs	Group 16 Premiership	Pambula Sporting Complex	Pambula Beach	1924
	Moruya Sharks	Group 16 Premiership	Ack Weyman Oval	Moruya	1925
	Mudgee Dragons	Peter McDonald Premiership	Glen Willow Regional Sports Complex	Mudgee	1921
	Narooma Devils	Group 16 Premiership	Bill Smyth Oval	Narooma	1929
	Narromine Jets	Castlereagh League	Cale Oval	Narromine	
	Nyngan Tigers	Peter McDonald Premiership	Larkin Oval	Nyngan	1946
	Orange CYMS	Peter McDonald Premiership	Wade Park	Orange	1945
	Orange Hawks	Peter McDonald Premiership	Wade Park	Orange	1958
	Parkes Spacemen	Peter McDonald Premiership	Jock Colley Field	Parkes	1945
	Queanbeyan Kangaroos	Canberra Raiders Cup	Seears Workwear Oval	Queanbeyan (Crestwood)	1966
	Queanbeyan United Blues	Canberra Raiders Cup	Seiffert Oval	Queanbeyan (Queanbeyan East)	1928
	South City Bulls	Group 9 Premiership	Harris Park	Wagga Wagga (Mount Austin)	2005
	Tathra Sea Eagles	Group 16 Premiership	Tathra Country Club Oval	Tathra	1926
	Temora Dragons	Group 9 Premiership	Nixon Park	Temora	1914
	Tullibigeal-Lakes United Sharks	Group 20 Premiership	Lake Cargelligo Recreation Oval	Lake Cargelligo	1971
	Tumut Blues	Group 9 Premiership	Twickenham Oval	Tumut	1923
	Wagga Wagga Brothers	Group 9 Premiership	GeoHex Park	Wagga Wagga (East Wagga Wagga)	1979
	Wagga Wagga Kangaroos	Group 9 Premiership	GeoHex Park	Wagga Wagga (East Wagga Wagga)	1954
	Warren Bulldogs	Castlereagh League	Warren Sporting Complex	Warren	1971
	Wellington Cowboys	Peter McDonald Premiership	Kennard Park	Wellington	1946
	West Wyalong Mallee Men	Group 20 Premiership	Ron Crowe Oval	West Wyalong	1911
	Yanco-Wamoon Hawks	Group 20 Premiership	Yanco Sports Ground	Yanco	1970
	Yass United Magpies	Canberra Raiders Cup	Walker Park	Yass	1919
	Yenda Blueheelers	Group 20 Premiership	Wade Park	Yenda	1929
Tier 5 Clubs (Second Division)
	Barellan Rams	Western Riverina Community Cup	Barellan Sports Ground	Barellan	1973
	Binalong Brahmans	George Tooke Shield	Binalong Recreation Ground	Binalong	1920
	Binnaway Bombshells	Castlereagh League Reserve Grade	Binnaway Oval	Binnaway	
	Blayney Bears	Woodbridge Cup	King George Oval	Blayney	
	Border Bears	Goulburn Murray Cup	Sarvaas Park	Albury (North Albury)	2024
	Boorowa Rovers	George Tooke Shield	Boorowa Showground	Boorowa	1920
	Brewarrina Golden Gougars	Barwon Darling Cup	Geoff New Oval	Brewarrina	
	Bungendore Tigers	George Tooke Shield	Bungendore Sports Hub	Bungendore	1952
	Canowindra Tigers	Woodbridge Cup	Tom Clyburn Oval	Canowindra	1920
	Cargo Blue Heelers	Woodbridge Cup	Cargo Oval	Cargo	
	Condobolin Rams	Woodbridge Cup	Pat Timmins Oval	Condobolin	
	Corowa Cougars	Goulburn Murray Cup	Corowa Rugby League Ground	Corowa	1986
	Cowra Magpies	Woodbridge Cup	Sid Kallas Oval	Cowra	
	Crookwell Green Devils	George Tooke Shield	Crookwell Memorial Oval	Crookwell	1925
	Deniliquin Blue Heelers	Western Riverina Community Cup	Rotary Park	Deniliquin	1964
	Eugowra Golden Eagles	Woodbridge Cup	Eugowra Sports Ground	Eugowra	1921
	Goodooga Magpies	Barwon Darling Cup	Magpie Oval	Goodooga	
	Googong Goannas	George Tooke Shield	Duncan Playing Fields	Queanbeyan (Googong)	2024
	Goolgowi-Merriwagga Rabbitohs	Western Riverina Community Cup	Goolgowi Recreation Ground	Goolgowi	1955
	Grenfell Goannas	Woodbridge Cup	Lawson Oval	Grenfell	
	Harden-Murrumburrah Hawks	George Tooke Shield	McLean Oval	Harden	1920
	Hillston Bluebirds	Western Riverina Community Cup	Stan Peters Oval	Hillston	1955
	Ivanhoe Roosters	Western Riverina Community Cup	Ivanhoe Sports Ground	Ivanhoe	1910
	Manildra Rhinos	Woodbridge Cup	Jack Huxley Oval	Manildra	1962
	Mendooran Tigers	Castlereagh League Reserve Grade	Robertson Park & Recreation Oval	Dunedoo	
	Molong Bulls	Woodbridge Cup	Molong Recreation Ground	Molong	
	Narrandera Lizards	Western Riverina Community Cup	Narrandera Sportsground	Narrandera	1921
	Oberon Tigers	Woodbridge Cup	Oberon Sports Recreation Ground	Oberon	1947
	Orange United Warriors	Woodbridge Cup	Wade Park	Orange	
	Peak Hill Roosters	Woodbridge Cup	Lindner Oval	Peak Hill	1951
	Rankins Springs Dragons	Western Riverina Community Cup	Rankins Springs Sports and Recreation Ground	Rankins Springs	1955
	Snowy River Bears	George Tooke Shield	JJ Connors Oval	Jindabyne	1977
	Trundle Boomers	Woodbridge Cup	Berryman Oval	Trundle	1927
	Tumbarumba Greens	Goulburn Murray Cup	Tumbarumba Showground	Tumbarumba	1934
	Walgett Dragons	Barwon Darling Cup	Ricky Walford Oval	Walgett	

==== Penrith Open Men's ====
Club	Moniker	Suburb
Blacktown City	Bears	Blacktown, New South Wales
Colyton	Colts	Colyton, New South Wales
Cambridge Park	Panthers	Cambridge Park, New South Wales
Doonside	Roos	Doonside, New South Wales
Emu Plains	Emus	Emu Plains, New South Wales
Glenmore Park	Broncos	Glenmore Park, New South Wales
Hawkesbury	Hawks	Hawkesbury, New South Wales
Katoomba	Devils	Katoomba, New South Wales
Londonderry	Greys	Londonderry, New South Wales
Lower Mountains	Mounties	Penrith, New South Wales
Minchinbury Jets	Magpies	Minchinbury, New South Wales
North West	Magpies	Norwest, New South Wales
Riverstone	Razorbacks	Riverstone, New South Wales
Penrith Brothers	Brothers	Penrith, New South Wales
Quakers Hill	Quakers	Quakers Hill, New South Wales
St Clair	Comets	St Clair, New South Wales
Western	Vikings	Penrith, New South Wales
Western City	Tigers	Penrith, New South Wales
Windsor	Wolves	Windsor, New South Wales

==== Southern Open Age (Cronulla/St George) ====
Club	Moniker	Suburb	Grade
Aquinas	Colts	Sutherland, New South Wales	Silver
Como-Jannali	Crocodiles	Como, New South Wales	Gold
De La Salle Caringbah	Saints	Caringbah, New South Wales	Gold
Engadine	Dragons	Engadine, New South Wales	Gold
Gymea	Gorillas	Gymea, New South Wales	Gold
Kogarah	Cougars	Kogarah, New South Wales	Gold
Renown United	United	Sydney, New South Wales	Silver
Riverwood Legion Club	Riverwood	Sutherland, New South Wales	Silver
St John Bosco	Bulldogs	Sutherland, New South Wales	Gold
St Joseph's	Kangaroos	Sutherland, New South Wales	Gold
Taren Point	Titans	Taren Point, New South Wales	Silver

==== South Sydney A-Grade ====
Club	Moniker	Suburb
A Grade
Alexandria Rovers	Rovers	Alexandria, New South Wales
Coogee	Dolphins	Coogee, New South Wales
Coogee Randwick	Wombats	Coogee, New South Wales
La Perouse United	Panthers	La Perouse, New South Wales
Mascot Juniors	Jets	Mascot, New South Wales
Marrickville RSL	Kings	Marrickville, New South Wales
Matraville	Tigers	Matraville, New South Wales
Moore Park	Broncos	Moore Park, New South Wales
Redfern All Blacks	All Blacks	Redfern, New South Wales
South Eastern	Seagulls	Malabar, New South Wales

=== Region 1: East Coast Dolphins/Northern Rivers Titans ===
==== Northern Rivers Regional Rugby League ====
- Ballina Seagulls
- Bilambil Jets
- Byron Bay Red Devils
- Casino Cougars
- Cudgen Hornets
- Evans Head Bombers
- Kyogle Turkeys
- Lismore Marist Brothers Rams
- Lower Clarence Magpies
- Mullumbimby Giants
- Murwillumbah Mustangs
- Northern United Dirrawongs (Lismore)
- Tweed Coast Raiders

==== Group 2 Rugby League ====
- Bellingen Dorrigo Magpies
- Coffs Harbour Comets
- Grafton Ghosts
- Macksville Sea Eagles
- Nambucca Heads Roosters
- Orara Valley Axemen
- Sawtell Panthers
- South Grafton Rebels
- Woolgoolga Seahorses

==== Group 3 Rugby League ====
- Forster Tuncurry Hawks
- Macleay Valley Mustangs
- Old Bar Beach Pirates
- Port City Breakers
- Port Macquarie Sharks
- Taree City Bulls
- Wauchope Blues
- Wingham Tigers

==== Hastings League ====
- Beechwood Shamrocks
- Comboyne Tigers
- Harrington Hurricanes
- Kendall Blues
- Lake Cathie Raiders
- Laurieton Stingrays
- Long Flat Dragons
- Lower Macleay Magpies
- South West Rocks Marlins

=== Region 2: Greater Northern Tigers ===
==== Group 4 Rugby League ====
- Boggabri Kangaroos
- Dungowan Cowboys
- Gunnedah Bulldogs
- Kootingal-Moonbi Roosters
- Moree Boars
- Narrabri Blues
- North Tamworth Bears
- Wee Waa Panthers
- Werris Creek Magpies

==== Group 19 Rugby League ====
- Armidale Rams
- Bingara Bullets
- Guyra Super Spuds
- Glen Innes Magpies
- Inverell RSM Hawks
- Moree Boomerangs
- Narwan Eels (Armidale)
- Tingha Tigers
- Uralla-Walcha Tigers/Roos
- Warialda Wombats

==== Group 21 Rugby League ====
- Aberdeen Tigers
- Denman Devils
- Greta-Branxton Colts
- Merriwa Magpies
- Murrurundi Mavericks
- Muswellbrook Rams
- Scone Thoroughbreds
- Singleton Greyhounds

=== Region 3: Bidgee Bulls ===
==== Canberra Rugby League ====
- Belconnen United Sharks
- Goulburn City Bulldogs
- Gungahlin Bulls
- Queanbeyan Kangaroos
- Queanbeyan United Blues
- Tuggeranong Bushrangers
- West Belconnen Warriors
- Woden Valley Rams
- Yass Magpies

==== George Tooke Shield (Canberra Second Division) ====
- Binalong Brahmans
- Boomanulla Raiders
- Boorowa Rovers
- Bungendore Tigers
- Burrangong Bears (Young)
- Cootamundra Bulldogs
- Crookwell Green Devils
- Gunning Roos
- Harden-Murrumburrah Hawks
- North Canberra Bears
- University of Canberra Stars

==== Group 9 Rugby League ====
- Albury Thunder
- Gundagai Tigers
- Junee Diesels
- South City Bulls
- Temora Dragons
- Tumut Blues
- Wagga Wagga Brothers
- Wagga Wagga Kangaroos
- Young Cherrypickers

==== Group 16 Rugby League ====
- Batemans Bay Tigers
- Bega Roosters
- Bombala Blue Heelers
- Cooma Stallions
- Eden Tigers
- Merimbula-Pambula Bulldogs
- Moruya Sharks
- Narooma Devils
- Snowy River Bears
- Tathra Sea Eagles

==== Group 17 Rugby League (Proten Community Cup) ====
- Barellan Rams
- Goolgowi-Merriwagga Rabbitohs
- Hillston Bluebirds
- Ivanhoe Roosters
- Narrandera Lizards
- Rankins Springs Dragons

==== Group 20 Rugby League ====
- Darlington Point-Coleambally Roosters
- Griffith Black & Whites
- Griffith Waratahs
- Hay Magpies
- Leeton Greenies
- Tullibigeal-Lake Cargelligo Sharks
- West Wyalong Mallee Men
- Yanco-Wamoon Hawks
- Yenda Blueheelers

=== Region 4: Western Rams ===
==== Peter McDonald Premiership ====
- Bathurst Panthers
- Bathurst St Patrick's
- Blayney Bears (Reserve Grade Only)
- Cowra Magpies
- Lithgow Workmen's Club Wolves
- Mudgee Dragons
- Orange CYMS
- Orange Hawks
- Dubbo CYMS
- Dubbo Macquarie Radiers
- Forbes Magpies
- Nyngan Tigers
- Parkes Spacemen
- Wellington Cowboys

==== Group 12 Rugby League (Outback Rugby League) ====
- Menindee Yabbies
- Parntu Warriors (Wilcannia)
- Silver City Scorpions
- Wilcannia Boomerangs

==== Group 14 Rugby League (Castlereagh Cup) ====
- Baradine Magpies
- Binnaway Bombshells
- Cobar Roosters
- Coolah Roos
- Coonabarabran Unicorns
- Coonamble Bears
- Dunedoo Swans
- Gilgandra Panthers
- Gulgong Terriers
- Narromine Jets

==== Group 15 Rugby League (Barwon Darling Cup) ====
- Bourke Warriors
- Brewarrina Golden Googars
- Collarenebri Bulldogs
- Goodooga Magpies
- Lightning Ridge Redbacks
- Newtown Wanderers
- Walgett Dragons

==== Woodbridge Cup ====
- Canowindra Tigers
- Cargo Blue Heelers
- CSU Bathurst Mungoes
- Condobolin Rams
- Eugowra Golden Eagles
- Grenfell Goannas
- Manildra Rhinos
- Molong Bulls
- Oberon Tigers
- Orange United Warriors
- Peak Hill Roosters
- Trundle Boomers

==== Mid West Cup ====
- Carcoar Crows
- Kandos Waratahs
- Portland Colts

=== Region 5: Illawarra South Coast Dragons ===
==== Illawarra Rugby League ====
- Collegians Red Dogs
- Corrimal Cougars
- Cronulla-Caringbah Sharks
- Dapto Canaries
- De La Salle Caringbah
- Helensburgh Tigers
- Thirroul Butchers
- Western Suburbs Red Devils
- Avondale Greyhounds
- Berkeley Eagles
- Figtree Crushers
- Mount Kembla Lowries
- Northern Suburbs
- Windang Pelicans
- Port Kembla Blacks
- Woonona-Bulli Bushrangers

==== Macarthur Division Rugby League (formerly Group 6) ====
- Camden Rams
- Campbelltown City Kangaroos
- Campbelltown Collegians
- East Campbelltown Eagles
- Mittagong Lions
- Oakdale Workers Bears
- The Oaks Tigers
- Picton Magpies
- South West Goannas
- Thirlmere-Tahmoor Roosters
- Appin Dogs
- Bargo Bunnies
- Campbelltown Warriors
- ESA Magpies
- Glenquarie All Stars
- Liverpool Catholic Club Raiders JRLFC
- Mt Annan Knights
- Narellan Jets
- Oran Park-Gregory Hills Chargers
- Warragamba Wombats

==== Group 7 Rugby League ====
- Berry-Shoalhaven Heads Magpies
- Gerringong Lions
- Jamberoo Superoos
- Kiama Knights
- Shellharbour Sharks
- Albion Park-Oak Flats Eagles
- Milton-Ulladulla Bulldogs
- Warilla-Lake South Gorillas
- Nowra-Bomaderry Jets
- Stingrays of Shellharbour
- Albion Park Outlaws
- Culburra Dolphins
- Robertson-Burrawang Spuddies
- Southern Highlands Storm (Bowral-Moss Vale)
- Sussex Inlet Panthers

=== Region 6: Newcastle and Central Coast ===
==== Central Coast Division Rugby League ====
- Berkeley Vale Panthers
- Erina Eagles
- Kincumber Colts
- Terrigal Sharks
- The Entrance Tigers
- Toukley Hawks
- Woy Woy Roosters
- Wyong Roos
- Ourimbah Wyoming Magpies
- St Edwards Bears
- Umina Beach Bunnies
- Blue Haven Raiders
- Budgewoi-Buff Point Bulldogs
- Gosford Kariong Storm
- Northern Lakes Warriors
- Warnervale Bulls

==== Newcastle Rugby League ====
- Central Charlestown Butcher Boys
- Cessnock Goannas
- Kurri Kurri Bulldogs
- Lakes United Seagulls
- Macquarie Scorpions
- Maitland Pumpkin Pickers
- Northern Hawks
- South Newcastle Lions
- Western Suburbs Rosellas
- Wyong Roos
- The Entrance Tigers

==== Newcastle and Hunter Rugby League ====
- Aberglasslyn Ants
- Abermain-Weston Hawks
- Awabakal United
- Belmont South Rabbitohs
- Budgewoi Bulldogs
- Cardiff Cobras
- Clarence Town Cobras
- Dora Creek Swampies
- Dudley Magpies
- Dungog Warriors
- East Maitland Griffins
- Fingal Bay Bomboras
- Glendale Gorillas
- Gloucester Magpies
- Hamilton Ducks
- Hinton Hornets
- Karuah Roos
- Kearsley Crushers
- Kotara Bears
- Lakes United Seagulls
- Maitland Pickers
- Maitland United
- Mallabula Panthers
- Morisset Bulls
- Morpeth Bulls
- Paterson River
- Raymond Terrace Magpies
- Shortland Devils
- South Newcastle Lions
- Stroud Raiders
- Swansea Swans
- Tall Timbers Timber Cutters
- Tea Gardens Hawks
- University of Newcastle Seahorses
- Wallsend Maryland Tigers
- Wangi Wangi Warriors
- Waratah Mayfield
- West Maitland
- West Wallsend Magpies
- Windale
- Woodberry

=== NSW Clubs in Victorian competitions ===
==== Murray Cup (NSW Clubs) ====
- Corowa Cougars
- CSU Muddogs
- Tumbarumba Greens (NSW)

=== NSW Clubs in QLD competitions ===
==== Balonne Barwon Junior Rugby League ====
- Mungindi Grasshoppers

==== Border Rugby League ====
- Tenterfield Tigers

==== Gold Coast Rugby League ====
- South Tweed Koalas
- Tweed Heads Seagulls

== Northern Territory ==
=== Affiliated States Championship ===
- Northern Territory Titans

=== Darwin Rugby League ===
- Darwin Brothers
- Litchfield Bears
- Northern Sharks
- Nightcliff Dragons
- Palmerston Raiders
- South Darwin Rabbitohs

=== Central Australian Rugby Football League ===
- Central Memorial Bulls
- United Magpies
- Alice Springs Brothers
- Wests Dragons

=== Gove Rugby League ===
- Gove Bulls

=== Katherine Rugby League ===
- Katherine Bushrangers
- Katherine Cowboys
- Katherine Raiders
- Katherine Tigers

== Queensland ==
=== State of Origin ===
Queensland Maroons

=== National Rugby League ===
Club	Location	Home Ground(s)	First season
Brisbane Broncos	Brisbane, Queensland	Suncorp Stadium 52,500 (12 home games)	1988
Dolphins	Brisbane, Queensland	Suncorp Stadium 52,500 (7 home games) Moreton Daily Stadium 11,500 (4 home games)	2023
Gold Coast Titans	Gold Coast, Queensland	Cbus Super Stadium 27,500 (12 home games)	2007
North Queensland Cowboys	Townsville, Queensland	North Queensland Stadium 25,000 (12 home games)	1995

=== Queensland Cup and Hastings Deering Colts ===
Queensland Cup
Colours	Rugby League Club	Est.	Joined*	City/Town	State/Territory	Stadium	Titles	Last	NRL Affiliate
	Brisbane Tigers	1917	1996	Brisbane	Queensland	Langlands Park	0	–	Storm
	Burleigh Bears	1934	1997	Gold Coast	Queensland	Pizzey Park	4	2019	Titans
	Central Queensland Capras	1996	1996	Rockhampton	Queensland	Browne Park	0	–	Dolphins
	Ipswich Jets	1982	1996	Ipswich	Queensland	North Ipswich Reserve	1	2015	Roosters
	Mackay Cutters	2007	2008	Mackay	Queensland	BB Print Stadium Mackay	1	2013	Cowboys
	Northern Pride	2007	2008	Cairns	Queensland	Barlow Park	2	2014	Cowboys
	Norths Devils	1933	1996	Brisbane	Queensland	Bishop Park	3	2022	Broncos
	PNG Hunters	2013	2014	Port Moresby	National Capital District	National Football Stadium	1	2017	None
	Redcliffe Dolphins	1947	1996	Moreton Bay	Queensland	Moreton Daily Stadium	6	2018	Dolphins
	Souths Logan Magpies	1918	2003	Brisbane	Queensland	Davies Park	1	2008	Broncos
	Sunshine Coast Falcons	1996	2008	Sunshine Coast	Queensland	Sunshine Coast Stadium	1	2009	Storm
	Townsville Blackhawks	2014	2015	Townsville	Queensland	Jack Manski Oval	0	–	Cowboys
	Tweed Heads Seagulls	1909	2003	Tweed Heads	NSW	Piggabeen Sports Complex	1	2007	Titans
	Western Clydesdales	2016	2023	Toowoomba	Queensland	Clive Berghofer Stadium	0	–	Bulldogs
	Wynnum Manly Seagulls	1951	1996	Brisbane	Queensland	Kougari Oval	2	2012	Broncos
* The season the team joined the competition in its current form and consecutive tenure.

=== Brisbane Rugby League ===
Team name	Nickname	Home ground
Beenleigh	Pride	Hammel Park
Brighton	Roosters	Jim Lawrie Oval
Bulimba	Bulldogs	Balmoral Recreation Reserve
Carina	Tigers	Leo Williams Oval
Fortitude Valley	Diehards	Emerson Park
Normanby	Hounds	Bert St Clair Oval
Pine Rivers	Bears	Mathieson Oval
Souths Juniors	Magpies	Brandon Park
Wests	Panthers	Frank Lind Oval
Wynnum-Manly Juniors	Seagulls	Kitchener Park

=== Brisbane Second Division Rugby League The Poinsettias / The Stingers (Juniors) ===
Northside 1 (10)	Northside 2 (9)	Northside 3 (8)	Southside 1 (8)	Southside 2 (8)	Southside 3 (12)
Aspley Devils; Brisbane Natives RLFC; Brisbane Brothers; Dayboro Cowboys; Gators RLFC; North Lakes Kangaroos; Pine Central Holy Spirit Hornets; Wests Arana Hills Panthers; Wests Mitchelton Panthers; Valleys Diehards	Banyo Devils; Brighton Roosters; Gators RLFC (2); Narangba Rangers; Normanby Hounds; North Lakes Kangaroos (2); Pine Central Holy Spirit Hornets (2); Pine Rivers Bears; Wests Mitchelton Panthers (2)	Aspley Devils (2); Brighton Roosters (2); Burpengary Jets; North Lakes Kangaroos (3); Pine Rivers Bears (2); Samford Stags; Wests Mitchelton Panthers (3); Valleys Diehards (2)	Beenleigh Pride; Bulimba Valley Bulldogs; Carina Tigers; Easts Tigers; Logan Brothers RLFC; Redlands Parrots; Souths Sunnybank RLFC; Waterford Demons	Beenleigh Pride (2); Browns Plains Bears; Bulimba Valley Bulldogs (2); Carina Tigers (2); Eagleby Giants; Souths Acacia Ridge Magpies; Wynnum-Manly Seagulls	Beaudesert Kingfishers; Brothers St. Brendans RLFC; Capalaba Warriors; Logan Brothers RLFC (2); Logan Wanderers; Mt. Gravatt Eagles; Mustangs RLFC; North Stradbroke Island Sharks; Rochedale Tigers; Souths Inala Warriors; Redlands Parrots (2); Waterford Demons (2)

=== Central Queensland Capras ===
==== Bundaberg Rugby League ====
- Brothers Bundaberg
- Easts
- Hervey Bay
- Wallaroo Maryborough
- Waves Tigers
- Western Suburbs

==== Central Highlands Rugby League ====
- Blackwater Crushers
- Bluff Rabbitohs
- Clermont Bears
- Dysart Bulls
- Emerald Brothers
- Emerald Tigers
- Middlemount Panthers
- Peak Downs Pirates
- Springsure Mountain Men

==== Central West Rugby League ====
- Alpha Brumbies
- Barcaldine Sandgoannas
- Blackall Magpies
- Longreach-Ilfracombe Tigers
- Winton Diamantina Devils

==== Gladstone and District Rugby League ====
- Calliope Roosters
- Brothers Gladstone
- Tannum Sands Seagulls
- Valleys Diehards Gladstone
- Wallaby RLFC

==== Rockhampton and District Rugby League ====
- Biloela Panthers
- Brothers Rockhampton
- Emu Park RLFC
- Fitzroy-Gracemere Sharks
- Norths Chargers
- Yeppoon Seagulls

=== South West Queensland Mustangs ===
==== Roma District Rugby League ====
- Chinchilla Bulldogs
- Roma Cities
- Miles Devils
- Mitchell Magpies
- St George Dragons
- Taroom-Wandoan Battlers
- Wallumbilla-Surat Red Bulls
- Western Ringers

==== Toowoomba Rugby League ====
- Brothers Toowoomba
- Dalby Devils
- Gatton Hawks
- Goondiwindi Boars
- Highfields Eagles
- Newtown Lions
- Oakey Bears
- Pittsworth Danes
- Southern Suburbs Tigers
- Toowoomba Valleys Roosters
- Warwick Cowboys
- Wattles Warriors

Border Rivers Rugby League (Part of Toowoomba Rugby League)

- Eastern Suburbs Hornets
- Inglewood Roosters
- MacIntyre Warriors (Boggabilla, NSWCRL)
- Stanthorpe Gremlins
- Tenterfield Tigers (NSWCRL)
- Texas Terriers

==== Defunct competitions ====
- Western Rugby League

=== Wide Bay Bulls ===
==== Central Burnett Rugby League ====
- Eidsvold Eagles
- Gayndah Gladiators
- Monto Roos
- Mundubbera Tigers

==== Northern Districts Rugby League ====
- Agnes Water Marlins
- Avondale Tigers
- Gin Gin Hawks
- Isis Devils (Childers)
- Miriam Vale Magpies
- South Kolan Sharks

==== South Burnett Rugby League ====
- Cherbourg Hornets
- Kingaroy Red Ants
- Murgon Mustangs
- Nanango Stags
- Wondai Proston Wolves

==== Sunshine Coast Rugby League ====
- Beachmere
- Beerwah Bulldogs
- Bribie Island Warrigals
- Caboolture Snakes
- Caloundra Sharks
- Coolum Colts
- Gympie Devils
- Kawana Dolphins
- Maroochydore-Coolum Swans
- Nambour Crushers
- Noosa Pirates
- Palmwoods Devils
- Pomona-Cooran Cutters
- Yandina Raiders

=== North Queensland Marlins ===
==== Cairns District Rugby League ====
- Atherton Roosters
- Cairns Brothers
- Innisfail Brothers
- Edmonton Storm
- Ivanhoes Knights
- Cairns Kangaroos
- Mareeba Gladiators
- Mossman Port Douglas Sharks
- Southern Suburbs Cockatoos
- Tully Tigers
- Yarrabah Seahawks

==== Mackay and District Rugby League ====
- Brothers Mackay
- Carltons
- Magpies
- Moranbah Miners
- Sarina Crocodiles
- Souths
- Wests
- Whitsundays Brahmans

==== Mid West Rugby League ====
- Hughenden Eagles
- Julia Creek Saints
- Normanton Stingers

==== Mount Isa Rugby League ====
- Mt Isa Brothers
- Cloncurry
- Black Star Diehards
- Mt Isa Townies
- Mt Isa Wranglers
- Mt Isa Wanderers

==== Remote Areas Rugby League ====
- Aurukun Kang Kang
- Central Cape Suns
- Cooktown Crocs
- Hope Vale Cockatoos
- Lockhart River Scorpions
- Mulga Tigers
- Napranum Bulldogs
- Old Mapoon
- Pormpuraaw Crocs
- Weipa Raiders
- Wujal Wujal Yindili
- Zenadth Kes RLFC

==== Townsville and District Rugby League ====
- Bowen Seagulls
- Townsville Brothers
- Burdekin (Ayr)
- Centrals Tigers
- Charters Towers Miners
- Herbert River Crushers
- Norths Devils
- Souths Bulls
- Western Lions

==== Defunct competitions ====
- Mid West Rugby League
- Northern Peninsula Area Rugby League

=== South East Poinsettias ===
==== Gold Coast Rugby League (The Vikings) ====
- Beaudesert Kingfishers
- Burleigh Bears
- Coolangatta Knights
- Coomera Cutters
- Currumbin Eagles
- Helensvale Hornets
- Jimboomba Thunder
- Mount Tamborine Bushrats
- Mudgeeraba Redbacks
- Nerang Roosters
- Ormeau Shearers
- Parkwood Sharks
- Robina Raptors
- Runaway Bay Seagulls
- South Tweed Koalas
- Southport Tigers
- Tugun Seahawks
- Tweed Heads Seagulls

==== Ipswich Rugby League (The Diggers) ====
- Brisbane Valley Bulls
- Brothers Ipswich Leprechauns
- Fassifern Bombers
- Goodna Eagles
- Karalee Tornadoes
- Laidley Lions
- Lowood Stags
- Northern Suburbs Tigers
- Redbank Plains Bears
- Rosewood Roosters
- Springfield Panthers
- Ipswich Swifts Bluebirds
- West End Bulldogs

== South Australia ==
=== Super League/National Rugby League ===
- Adelaide Rams (defunct)

=== Affiliated States Championship ===
- South Australia rugby league team

=== Adelaide Rugby League Premiership ===
- Central Districts Roosters
- Eastern Eels
- MEC Black Swans
- South Adelaide Bulldogs
- Western District Warriors

=== Limestone Coast Rugby League ===
The Limestone Coast Rugby League is a competition co-administered by NRL SA and NRL Victoria.

- Blue Lake Knights (Mount Gambier)
- Gunditjmara Bulls*
- Naracoorte Jets
- Stawell Mounties*
- Warrnambool Raiders*

== Tasmania ==
=== Affiliated States Championship ===
- Tasmania rugby league team

=== Tasmanian Rugby League ===
- Clarence Eels
- Hobart Tigers
- Launceston Warriors
- North West Coast Titans
- Northern Suburbs Broncos
- New Norfolk Cowboys
- Newtown Roosters
- South Hobart Storm
- Southern Rabbitohs
- Sandy Bay Sharks
- Taroona Dragons
- University of Tasmania Panthers

== Victoria ==
=== National Rugby League ===
- Melbourne Storm

=== S. G. Ball Cup/New South Wales Cup/National Rugby League ===
- Victoria Thunderbolts

=== Affiliated States Championship ===
- Victoria rugby league team

=== Melbourne Rugby League ===
Colours	Clubs	Location	Ground	Founded	Senior Premierships
	Waverley Oakleigh Panthers	Clayton	Fregon Reserve, Clayton	1976	4 (1980, 1992, 1993, 1994)
	Altona Roosters	Newport	Bruce Comben Reserve, Altona Meadows	1987	8 (1997, 2003, 2004, 2005, 2006, 2008, 2010, 2012)
	Sunbury United Tigers	Sunbury	Langama Park, Sunbury	1992	4 (2009, 2011, 2013, 2014)
	Northern Thunder	Broadmeadows	Seabrook Reserve, Goulburn St, Broadmeadows	1999	0
	Doveton Steelers	Doveton	Betula Reserve, Doveton	2001	1 (2007)
	South Eastern Titans	Dandenong	Greaves Reserve, Dandenong	2007	0
	Werribee Bears	Werribee	Haines Reserve, Werribee	2008	3 (2016, 2017, 2018)
	North West Wolves	Niddrie	AJ Davis Reserve, Fullarton Rd, Airport West	2010	0
	Casey Warriors	Clyde	Casey Fields, Cranbourne East	2010	1 (2015)
	Eastern Raptors	Boronia	Colchester Reserve, Colchester Rd, Boronia	2011	0
	Melton Broncos	Melton	Mt Carberry Reserve, Melton South	2013	0
	Frankston Raiders	Frankston	Peninsula Reserve, Frankston	2015	1 (1983)
	Mernda Dragons	Lalor	Huskisson Reserve, Lalor	2015	0
	Truganina Rabbitohs	Truganina	Clearwood Drive Reserve, Truganina	2015	2 (2019, 2022)
	Sunshine Cowboys	Ardeer	More Park, Ardeer	2016	0
	Pakenham Eels	Pakenham	Cardinia Recreation Reserve, Cardinia	2016	0
	Hume Eagles	Craigieburn	Hothlyn Drive Reserve, Craigieburn	2020	0

=== Goulburn Murray Rugby League ===
- Border Bears
- CSU Muddogs*
- Corowa Cougars*
- Shepparton Eagles
- Tumbarumba Greens*
- Wangaratta Knights
- Wodonga Wombats
- Wolfpack RLFC

=== Sunraysia-Riverlands Rugby League ===
- Mildura Tigers
- Mildura Warriors
- Robinvale Storm

=== Limestone Coast Rugby League ===
The Limestone Coast Rugby League is a competition co-administered by NRL SA and NRL Victoria.

- Blue Lake Knights (Mount Gambier)*
- Gunditjmara Bulls
- Naracoorte Jets*
- Stawell Mounties
- Warrnambool Raiders

== Western Australia ==
=== Australian Rugby League/Super League/National Rugby League ===
- Perth Bears
- Western Reds (Defunct)

=== S. G. Ball Cup ===
- West Coast Pirates (Defunct)

=== Affiliated States Championship ===
- Western Australia rugby league team

=== NRLWA Premiership ===
Colours	Club	District	Ground	Founded	Junior Association
	Fremantle Roosters*	Fremantle	Treeby Sports Complex	1948	Southern Pride
	South Perth Lions*	South Perth	George Burnett Park	1948	Southern Pride
	Kalamunda Bulldogs	Belmont	Hartfield Park	1949	Northern Fusion
	North Beach Sea Eagles*	North Beach	Charles Riley Reserve	1951	Northern Fusion
	Willagee Bears	Willagee	Webber Reserve	1962	Southern Pride
	Rockingham Coastal Sharks*	Rockingham	Lark Hill Sports Complex	1988	South West Dolphins
	Joondalup Giants*	Joondalup	Admiral Reserve	1990	Northern Fusion
	Mandurah Storm	Mandurah	Ocean road reserve	2013	South West Dolphins
	Ellenbrook Rabbitohs*	Ellenbrook	Charlottes Vinyard Pavilion	2015	Northern Fusion
	Kwinana Titans	Kwinana	Thomas Oval	2022	South West Dolphins
	Alkimos Tigers	Eglinton	Amberton Playing Fields	2015	Northern Fusion
	Busselton Broncos	Busselton	Busselton Sportsmans Club	2017	South West Dolphins
	Bunbury Titans	Bunbury	Hay Park Sports Complex	2017	South West Dolphins
	Dalyellup Rhinos	Dalleyup	East Dalyellup Pavilion	2017	South West Dolphins
	Eaton Panthers	Eaton		2017	South West Dolphins
	Albany Sea Dragons	Albany		2019	South West Dolphins

* Denotes currently fielding a First Grade Team in the Fuel to Go and Play Premiership

=== East Pilbara Rugby League ===
- Tom Price Steelers Rugby League Club
- Paraburdoo Pirates Touch & Rugby League Football Club
- Pannawonica Panthers

=== Goldfields Rugby League ===
- Goldfields Titans (Kalgoorlie)

=== Kimberley Rugby League ===
- Kununurra Thunder
- Ord River Bulls

=== Pilbara Rugby League ===
The Pilbara Rugby League is a seven club competition in the north-west of Western Australia. The clubs are:

- Broome Jets
- Karratha Broncos
- Karratha Roosters
- Karratha Storm
- Port Hedland Hawks
- South Hedland Cougars
- Wickham Wasps

== See also ==
- List of Australian rules football clubs in Australia
- List of baseball teams in Australia
- List of basketball clubs in Australia
- List of rowing clubs in Australia
- List of Australian rugby union teams
- List of soccer clubs in Australia
- List of yacht clubs in Australia
- List of teams in the NSWRL/ARL/SL/NRL
- Rugby league in Australia
- List of rugby league clubs in France
- List of rugby league clubs in New Zealand
- Rugby League Competitions in Australia
