= List of senior rugby league clubs in New South Wales =

This is a list of New South Wales Rugby League clubs by competition. There are over 450 clubs in New South Wales, across over 30 competitions administered by the NSWRL Conference (Sydney) and six regions.

== National Rugby League ==
Club	Location	Home ground(s)	First season
Canterbury-Bankstown Bulldogs	Sydney	Stadium Australia (6 games) (83,500) Western Sydney Stadium (5 games) (30,000)	1935
Cronulla-Sutherland Sharks	Sydney	Shark Park (11 games) (22,500)	1967
Manly Warringah Sea Eagles	Sydney	Brookvale Oval (11 games) (23,000)	1947
Newcastle Knights	Newcastle	Newcastle International Sports Centre (12 games) (33,000)	1988
Parramatta Eels	Sydney	Western Sydney Stadium (11 games) (20,000) Marrara Oval (1 game) (14,000)	1947
Penrith Panthers	Penrith (Sydney)	Penrith Stadium (11 games) (22,000)	1967
South Sydney Rabbitohs	Sydney	Stadium Australia (9 games) (83,500) Central Coast Stadium (1 game) (20,000)	1908
St. George Illawarra Dragons	Sydney Wollongong	Jubilee Oval (6 games) (20,500) Wollongong Stadium (6 games) (22,000)	1999
Sydney Roosters	Sydney	Sydney Football Stadium (11 games) (42,500) Central Coast Stadium (1 game) (20,000)	1908
Wests Tigers	Sydney	Campbelltown Stadium (4 games) (20,000) Leichhardt Oval (4 games) (20,000) Western Sydney Stadium (4 games) (30,000)	2000

== NSWRL major competitions ==
=== New South Wales Cup ===
**Knock-On Effect New South Wales Cup**
Colours	Rugby league club	Est.	Joined*	City/town	Stadium/s
	Blacktown Workers Sea Eagles	1962	2017	Sydney (Blacktown)	4 Pines Park, HE Laybutt Field
	Canberra Raiders	1982	2021	Canberra	GIO Stadium
	Canterbury-Bankstown Bulldogs	1935	2021	Sydney (Bankstown)	Accor Stadium, Belmore Sports Ground
	Newcastle Knights	1988	2012	Newcastle	McDonald Jones Stadium
	New Zealand Warriors	1995	2023	Auckland	Go Media Stadium, North Harbour Stadium
	Newtown Jets	1908	2000	Sydney (Newtown)	Henson Park
	North Sydney Bears	1908	2003	Sydney (North Sydney)	North Sydney Oval
	Parramatta Eels	1947	2020	Sydney (Parramatta)	CommBank Stadium, Eric Tweedale Stadium
	Penrith Panthers	1966	2014	Sydney (Penrith)	BlueBet Stadium
	South Sydney Rabbitohs	1999	2018	Sydney (Redfern)	Accor Stadium, Redfern Oval
	St George Illawarra Dragons	1908	2019	Sydney (Kogarah), Wollongong	Collegians Sporting Complex
	Sydney Roosters	1908	2023	Sydney (Bondi)	Wentworth Park
	Western Suburbs Magpies	1908	2018	Sydney (Campbelltown)	Lidcombe Oval, Campbelltown Sports Stadium

Bold = standalone club

=== Ron Massey Cup ===
**Leagues Club Australia Ron Massey Cup**
Colours	Rugby league club	Est.	Joined*	City/town	Stadium/s
	Canterbury-Bankstown Bulldogs	1935	2023	Sydney (Bankstown)	Hammondville Oval
	Glebe Dirty Reds	1908	2021	Sydney (Glebe)	Wentworth Park
	Hills District Bulls	1964	2016	Sydney (Baulkham Hills)	Crestwood Reserve
	Mount Pritchard Mounties	1927	2007	Sydney (Mount Pritchard)	Aubrey Keech Reserve
	Penrith Brothers	1968	2018	Sydney (Penrith)	Parker Street Reserve
	Ryde-Eastwood Hawks	1962	2003	Sydney (Ryde)	TG Milner Field
	St Marys Saints	1908	2016	Sydney (St Marys)	St Marys Leagues Stadium
	Wentworthville Magpies	1963	2003	Sydney (Wentworthville)	Ringrose Park

=== Sydney Shield ===
**Sydney Shield**
Colours	Rugby league club	Est.	Joined*	City/town	Stadium/s
	Cabramatta Two Blues	1919	2012	Sydney (Cabramatta)	New Era Stadium
	Glebe Dirty Reds	1908	2021	Sydney (Glebe)	Wentworth Park
	Hills District Bulls	1964	2016	Sydney (Baulkham Hills)	Crestwood Reserve
	Manly Warringah Sea Eagles	1947	2024	Sydney (Davidson)	Lionel Watts Park, 4 Pines Park
	Moorebank Rams	1976	2017	Sydney (Moorebank)	Hammondville Oval
	Mount Pritchard Mounties	1927	2012	Sydney (Mount Pritchard)	Aubrey Keech Reserve
	Penrith Brothers	1968	2018	Sydney (Penrith)	Parker Street Reserve
	Ryde-Eastwood Hawks	1962	2012	Sydney (Ryde)	TG Milner Field
	St Marys Saints	1908	2016	Sydney (St Marys)	St Marys Leagues Stadium
	Wentworthville Magpies	1963	2012	Sydney (Wentworthville)	Ringrose Park

== NSWRL community First Grade competitions ==
=== Central Sydney & Macarthur ===
==== Central Northern Gold ====
Central Northern Open Age Gold
Colours	Rugby league club	Est.	City/town	Stadium/s
	Asquith Magpies	1953	Sydney (Asquith)	Storey Park
	Belrose Eagles	1955	Sydney (Belrose)	Lionel Watts Park
	Cromer Kingfishers		Sydney (Cromer)	St Matthews Farm
	Harbord United Devils		Sydney (Freshwater)	Harbord Park
	Leichhardt Wanderers	1911	Sydney (Leichhardt)	Blackmore Oval
	Narrabeen Sharks		Sydney (Narrabeen)	Lake Park
	Narraweena Hawks		Sydney (Narraweena)	Beverley Job Oval
	Ryde-Eastwood Hawks	1962	Sydney (Ryde)	TG Milner Field

==== Central West Gold ====
Central West Open Men Gold
Colours	Rugby league club	Est.	City/town	Stadium/s
	East Hills Bulldogs		Sydney (Castle Hill)	Smith Park
	Hills District Bulls	1964	Sydney (Baulkham Hills)	Crestwood Reserve
	Moorebank Rams	1976	Sydney (Moorebank)	Hammondville Oval
	Mount Pritchard Mounties	1927	Sydney (Mount Pritchard)	Mount Pritchard Community Showground
	Wentworthville Magpies	1963	Sydney (Wentworthville)	Ringrose Park

==== Macarthur First Grade Premiership ====
Wests Group Macarthur First Grade Premiership
Colours	Rugby league club	Est.	City/town	Stadium/s
	Camden Rams	1910	Sydney (Elderslie)	Kirkham Oval
	Campbelltown City Kangaroos	1908	Sydney (Claymore)	Fullwood Reserve
	Campbelltown Collegians		Sydney (Bradbury)	Bradbury Oval
	East Campbelltown Eagles	1961	Sydney (Campbelltown)	Waminda Oval
	Mittagong Lions	1914	Mittagong	Mittagong Sports Ground
	Narellan Jets	1977	Sydney (Narellan)	Narellan Sports Ground
	Oakdale Workers Bears	1963	Oakdale	Sid Sharpe Memorial Oval
	Picton Magpies		Picton	Victoria Park
	South West Goannas	2021	Sydney (Camden)	Onslow Oval
	The Oaks Tigers		The Oaks	Dudley Chesham Sports Ground
	Thirlmere-Tahmoor Roosters	1976	Thirlmere	Thirlmere Sports Ground

==== South Sydney First Grade Premiership ====
South Sydney A Grade
Colours	Rugby league club	Est.	City/town	Stadium/s
	Alexandria Rovers	1948	Sydney (Alexandria)	Erskineville Oval
	Coogee Dolphins	1993	Sydney (Coogee)	Coogee Oval
	Coogee-Randwick Wombats	1953	Sydney (Coogee)	Marcellin Fields
	Marrickville RSL Kings		Sydney (Marrickville)	Marrickville Oval
	Mascot Juniors	1910	Sydney (Mascot)	Mascot Oval
	Matraville Tigers		Sydney (Matraville)	Heffron Park
	Redfern All Blacks	1944	Sydney (Redfern)	Waterloo Oval
	South Eastern Seagulls	1957	Sydney (Malabar)	Pioneers Park

== Regional leagues (formerly CRL) ==
=== Region 1: East Coast Dolphins/Northern Rivers Titans ===
==== Northern Rivers Regional Rugby League ====
- Ballina Seagulls
- Bilambil Jets
- Byron Bay Red Devils
- Casino Cougars
- Cudgen Hornets
- Evans Head Bombers
- Kyogle Turkeys
- Lismore Marist Brothers Rams
- Lower Clarence Magpies
- Mullumbimby Giants
- Murwillumbah Mustangs
- Northern United Dirrawongs (Lismore)
- Tweed Coast Raiders

==== Group 2 Rugby League ====
- Bellingen Dorrigo Magpies
- Coffs Harbour Comets
- Grafton Ghosts
- Macksville Sea Eagles
- Nambucca Heads Roosters
- Orara Valley Axemen
- Sawtell Panthers
- South Grafton Rebels
- Woolgoolga Seahorses

==== Group 3 Rugby League ====
- Forster Tuncurry Hawks
- Macleay Valley Mustangs
- Old Bar Beach Pirates
- Port City Breakers
- Port Macquarie Sharks
- Taree City Bulls
- Wauchope Blues
- Wingham Tigers

==== Hastings League ====
- Beechwood Shamrocks
- Comboyne Tigers
- Harrington Hurricanes
- Kendall Blues
- Lake Cathie Raiders
- Laurieton Stingrays
- Long Flat Dragons
- Lower Macleay Magpies
- South West Rocks Marlins

=== Region 2: Greater Northern Tigers ===
==== Group 4 Rugby League ====
- Boggabri Kangaroos
- Dungowan Cowboys
- Gunnedah Bulldogs
- Kootingal-Moonbi Roosters
- Moree Boars
- Narrabri Blues
- North Tamworth Bears
- Wee Waa Panthers
- Werris Creek Magpies

==== Group 19 Rugby League ====
- Armidale Rams
- Bingara Bullets
- Guyra Super Spuds
- Glen Innes Magpies
- Inverell RSM Hawks
- Moree Boomerangs
- Narwan Eels (Armidale)
- Tingha Tigers
- Uralla-Walcha Tigers/Roos
- Warialda Wombats

==== Group 21 Rugby League ====
- Aberdeen Tigers
- Denman Devils
- Greta-Branxton Colts
- Merriwa Magpies
- Murrurundi Mavericks
- Muswellbrook Rams
- Scone Thoroughbreds
- Singleton Greyhounds

=== Region 3: Bidgee Bulls ===
==== Canberra Rugby League ====
- Belconnen United Sharks
- Goulburn City Bulldogs
- Gungahlin Bulls
- Queanbeyan Kangaroos
- Queanbeyan United Blues
- Tuggeranong Bushrangers
- West Belconnen Warriors
- Woden Valley Rams
- Yass Magpies

==== George Tooke Shield (Canberra Second Division) ====
- Binalong Brahmans
- Boomanulla Raiders
- Boorowa Rovers
- Bungendore Tigers
- Burrangong Bears (Young)
- Cootamundra Bulldogs
- Crookwell Green Devils
- Gunning Roos
- Harden-Murrumburrah Hawks
- North Canberra Bears
- University of Canberra Stars

==== Group 9 Rugby League ====
- Albury Thunder
- Gundagai Tigers
- Junee Diesels
- South City Bulls
- Temora Dragons
- Tumut Blues
- Wagga Wagga Brothers
- Wagga Wagga Kangaroos
- Young Cherrypickers

==== Group 16 Rugby League ====
- Batemans Bay Tigers
- Bega Roosters
- Bombala Blue Heelers
- Cooma Stallions
- Eden Tigers
- Merimbula-Pambula Bulldogs
- Moruya Sharks
- Narooma Devils
- Snowy River Bears
- Tathra Sea Eagles

==== Group 17 Rugby League (Proten Community Cup) ====
- Barellan Rams
- Goolgowi-Merriwagga Rabbitohs
- Hillston Bluebirds
- Ivanhoe Roosters
- Narrandera Lizards
- Rankins Springs Dragons

==== Group 20 Rugby League ====
- Darlington Point-Coleambally Roosters
- Griffith Black & Whites
- Griffith Waratahs Tigers
- Hay Magpies
- Leeton Greenies
- Tullibigeal-Lake Cargelligo Sharks
- West Wyalong Mallee Men
- Yanco-Wamoon Hawks
- Yenda Blueheelers

=== Region 4: Western Rams ===
==== Peter McDonald Premiership ====
- Bathurst Panthers
- Bathurst St Patrick's
- Blayney Bears (Reserve Grade Only)
- Cowra Magpies
- Lithgow Workmen's Club Wolves
- Mudgee Dragons
- Orange CYMS
- Orange Hawks
- Dubbo CYMS
- Dubbo Macquarie Radiers
- Forbes Magpies
- Nyngan Tigers
- Parkes Spacemen
- Wellington Cowboys

==== Group 12 Rugby League (Outback Rugby League) ====
- Menindee Yabbies
- Parntu Warriors (Wilcannia)
- Silver City Scorpions
- Wilcannia Boomerangs

==== Group 14 Rugby League (Castlereagh Cup) ====
- Baradine Magpies
- Binnaway Bombshells
- Cobar Roosters
- Coolah Roos
- Coonabarabran Unicorns
- Coonamble Bears
- Dunedoo Swans
- Gilgandra Panthers
- Gulgong Terriers
- Narromine Jets

==== Group 15 Rugby League (Barwon Darling Cup) ====
- Bourke Warriors
- Brewarrina Golden Googars
- Collarenebri Bulldogs
- Goodooga Magpies
- Lightning Ridge Redbacks
- Newtown Wanderers
- Walgett Dragons

==== Woodbridge Cup ====
- Canowindra Tigers
- Cargo Blue Heelers
- CSU Bathurst Mungoes
- Condobolin Rams
- Eugowra Golden Eagles
- Grenfell Goannas
- Manildra Rhinos
- Molong Bulls
- Oberon Tigers
- Orange United Warriors
- Peak Hill Roosters
- Trundle Boomers

==== Mid West Cup ====
- Carcoar Crows
- Kandos Waratahs
- Portland Colts

=== Region 5: Illawarra South Coast Dragons ===
==== Illawarra Rugby League ====
- Collegians Red Dogs
- Corrimal Cougars
- Cronulla-Caringbah Sharks
- Dapto Canaries
- De La Salle Caringbah
- Helensburgh Tigers
- Thirroul Butchers
- Western Suburbs Red Devils
- Avondale Greyhounds
- Berkeley Eagles
- Figtree Crushers
- Mount Kembla Lowries
- Northern Suburbs
- Windang Pelicans
- Port Kembla Blacks
- Woonona-Bulli Bushrangers

==== Macarthur Division Rugby League (formerly Group 6) ====
- Camden Rams
- Campbelltown City Kangaroos
- Campbelltown Collegians
- East Campbelltown Eagles
- Mittagong Lions
- Oakdale Workers Bears
- The Oaks Tigers
- Picton Magpies
- South West Goannas
- Thirlmere-Tahmoor Roosters
- Appin Dogs
- Bargo Bunnies
- Campbelltown Warriors
- ESA Magpies
- Glenquarie All Stars
- Liverpool Catholic Club Raiders JRLFC
- Mt Annan Knights
- Narellan Jets
- Oran Park-Gregory Hills Chargers
- Warragamba Wombats

==== Group 7 Rugby League ====
- Berry-Shoalhaven Heads Magpies
- Gerringong Lions
- Jamberoo Superoos
- Kiama Knights
- Shellharbour Sharks
- Albion Park-Oak Flats Eagles
- Milton-Ulladulla Bulldogs
- Warilla-Lake South Gorillas
- Nowra-Bomaderry Jets
- Stingrays of Shellharbour
- Albion Park Outlaws
- Culburra Dolphins
- Robertson-Burrawang Spuddies
- Southern Highlands Storm (Bowral-Moss Vale)
- Sussex Inlet Panthers

=== Region 6: Newcastle & Central Coast ===
==== Central Coast Division Rugby League ====
- Berkeley Vale Panthers
- Erina Eagles
- Kincumber Colts
- Terrigal Sharks
- The Entrance Tigers
- Toukley Hawks
- Woy Woy Roosters
- Wyong Roos
- Ourimbah Wyoming Magpies
- St Edwards Bears
- Umina Beach Bunnies
- Blue Haven Raiders
- Budgewoi-Buff Point Bulldogs
- Gosford Kariong Storm
- Northern Lakes Warriors
- Warnervale Bulls

==== Newcastle Rugby League ====
- Central Charlestown Butcher Boys
- Cessnock Goannas
- Kurri Kurri Bulldogs
- Lakes United Seagulls
- Macquarie Scorpions
- Maitland Pumpkin Pickers
- Northern Hawks
- South Newcastle Lions
- Western Suburbs Rosellas
- Wyong Roos
- The Entrance Tigers

==== Newcastle & Hunter Rugby League ====
- Aberglasslyn Ants
- Abermain-Weston Hawks
- Awabakal United
- Belmont South Rabbitohs
- Budgewoi Bulldogs
- Cardiff Cobras
- Central Charlestown Butcher Boys
- Clarence Town Cobras
- Dora Creek Swampies
- Dudley Magpies
- Dungog Warriors
- East Maitland Griffins
- Fingal Bay Bomboras
- Glendale Gorillas
- Gloucester Magpies
- Hamilton Ducks
- Hinton Hornets
- Karuah Roos
- Kearsley Crushers
- Kotara Bears
- Kurri Kurri Bulldogs
- Lakes United Seagulls
- Maitland Pickers
- Maitland United
- Mallabula Panthers
- Morisset Bulls
- Morpeth Bulls
- Northern Lakes Warriors
- Paterson River
- Raymond Terrace Magpies
- Shortland Devils
- South Newcastle Lions
- Stroud Raiders
- Swansea Swans
- Tea Gardens Hawks
- University of Newcastle Seahorses
- Wallsend Maryland Tigers
- Wangi Wangi Warriors
- Waratah Mayfield
- West Maitland
- West Wallsend Magpies
- Windale
- Woodberry

=== NSW clubs in Victorian competitions ===
==== Murray Cup (NSW clubs) ====
- Corowa Cougars
- CSU Muddogs
- Tumbarumba Greens (NSW)

=== NSW clubs in QLD competitions ===
==== Balonne Barwon Junior Rugby League ====
- Mungindi Grasshoppers

==== Border Rugby League ====
- Tenterfield Tigers

==== Gold Coast Rugby League ====
- South Tweed Koalas

== See also ==
- New South Wales Rugby League
- Country Rugby League
- Rugby league in New South Wales
