= Wodonga Storm =

Club information
- Full name: Wodonga Storm Junior Rugby League Football Club
- Colours: Blue; Purple

Current details
- Ground(s): *Baranduda Reserve, Wodonga *Wodonga Athletics Centre
- CEO: Mark Hicks
- Competition: Goulburn Murray Rugby League

Wodonga Storm Junior Rugby League Football Club is an Australian rugby league football club based in Wodonga, Victoria. They conduct teams for both junior, senior and women tag teams.

== See also ==
- Rugby league in Victoria
