= Jone Macilai =

Jone Macilai may refer to:

- Jone Macilai (rugby league) (born 1983), a Fijian rugby league player
- Jone Macilai-Tori (born 1990), a Fijian rugby union player
