= Lower Clarence Magpies =

Australian rugby league club, based in Yamba, NSW

Club information
- Full name: Lower Clarence Rugby League Football Club
- Short name: Magpies
- Colours: Black; White
- Founded: 1915; 110 years ago
- Website: Official website

Current details
- Ground(s): Yamba Sporting Complex
- Coach: Luke Douglas
- Captain: Luke Douglas
- Competition: Northern Rivers Regional Rugby League

Records
- Premierships: 7 (1952, 1962, 1964, 1965, 1973, 1984, 2009)

The Lower Clarence Magpies are an Australian rugby league football club based in Yamba, New South Wales. The club was founded as Maclean in 1915, later becoming Lower River. They rebranded again as Lower Clarence when they joined the newly formed Group 1 competition in 1966.

== History ==
The club was founded in Maclean in 1915. They competed in the various Clarence River, Upper Clarence and Group 2 competitions of the time, playing home games at Jubilee Park in Maclean. Under the first past the post system in 1951, they finished as runners-up, finishing a single point behind Grafton All Blacks despite having won both their matches that season. With the finals system re-introduced in 1952, they finished the regular season as minor premiers. They defeated All Blacks in the major semi, but lost to South Grafton in the final. As a result, a grand final was played at the Grafton Showground, which they won 9-7 thanks to a last-minute penalty goal by fullback Billo Mullins.

They rebranded to Lower River in the 1954, when the Maclean, Harwood and Lawrence clubs all merged into one, wearing red, white and blue jerseys. They enjoyed several strong years in the late 50s and early 60s, consistently making the finals and finishing as runners-up in 1961 and premiers in 1962 (winning all three grades), 1964 and 1965. They were also minor premiers in 1963.

With the merger of the Richmond and Clarence River leagues to form Group 1 in 1966, the club rebranded as Lower Clarence, adopting the magpie as their mascot and wearing black and white jerseys.

Despite winning the 1970 minor premiership, the club missed out on the grand final. They made the decider in 1971, but were defeated by Kyogle 14–9. They finished as minor premiers again in 1973 and went on to claim their first Group 1 premiership when they beat Marist Brothers 27–13 in the grand final at Casino. Around this time, the club relocated from Jubilee Park to the Maclean Showground, which would be their base for the next four decades.

Despite finishing as minor premiers in 1983, the Magpies were again beaten in the grand final by Kyogle. They bounced back the following season to win the title, thumping arch-rivals Grafton 25–8 in Grafton in the grand final.

The club struggled in the years that followed, coming to the brink of extinction around the turn of the millennium. The Lower Clarence Magpies juniors merged with second division club Yamba Eagles to form the Clarence Coast Magpies Junior Rugby League Club.

The club began to bounce back and fielded strong sides in the late-2000s after Group 1 and Group 18 merged to form the Northern Rivers Regional Rugby League. In 2009, they claimed the minor premiership and won the right to host the grand final for the first time in 46 years. In the grand final, they raced to a 14–6 lead at half time over competition newcomers Northern United. Despite an ill-disciplined and injury affected second half, they held off a strong comeback to win 21–20, thanks to a field goal by fullback Grant Brown within the final five minutes, breaking a 25-year premiership drought.

Following the premiership success, a number of players left the club, with a large group joining Northern United, as well as Hughie Stanley signing with the Sydney Roosters under 20s team and captain-coach Dallas Waters retiring. The club fell to the bottom of the table, suffering several humiliating defeats. They spent much of the 2010s struggling to field teams from first grade down to juniors, despite a boost in the club's popularity for their centenary year in 2015.

The club also relocated to Yamba, where the majority of their squad was based, in an attempt boost player numbers. The Yamba Sporting Complex received government funding for an upgrade to facilities as a result. They began to bounce back despite the COVID-19 pandemic, recruiting local junior and NRL and international player Luke Douglas as captain-coach. With a crop of talented local juniors including Cooper Many, Vincent Williams and Dalton Shaw returning to the club, along with 2009 hero Brown, the Magpies will field teams in all three senior men's competitions, as well as both senior women's competitions.

In 2023, the Magpies surprised many when they qualified for the finals in all three men's grades, as well as finishing as runners-up in the Open Women's Tackle competition. It marked the first time in 14 years that first grade had qualified for the finals series.

== Lower Legends Team ==
To celebrate the club's centenary in 2015, the Lower Legends Team was launched, featuring the 17 best Lower Clarence players since 1952.

The team was: Raymond Laurie, Dick Ensbey, Garry Chapman, Steven Laurie, Ryan Binge, Bill McCarron, John Gahon, Gary Want, Steve O'Sullivan, Jimmy Hooper, Peter Horne, Wayne McCarron, Mark McIntyre, Gary Tobin, George Trudgett, Dale Randall, Bernie Plater, John Brown (coach).

== Notable juniors ==
Notable juniors to represent the Magpies include:

- Brian Smith
- Raymond Laurie
- Kevin Plummer
- Nathan Brown
- Tony Priddle
- Daniel Wagon
- Daine Laurie (born 1984)
- Luke Douglas
- Daine Laurie (born 1999)

== See also ==
- List of rugby league clubs in Australia
- List of senior rugby league clubs in New South Wales
