= Kyogle Turkeys =

Australian rugby league club, based in Kyogle, NSW

Club information
- Full name: Kyogle Turkeys Senior Rugby League Football Club
- Nickname: Turks
- Colours: Red; White; Navy Blue
- Founded: 1960; 66 years ago
- Website: https://www.facebook.com/Kyogleturkeys?mibextid=LQQJ4d

Current details
- Ground: New Park
- Coach: Hayden Pratt
- Manager: Shane Bianchetti
- Captain: Hayden Pratt
- Competition: Northern Rivers Rugby League

Records
- Premierships: 2 (1971, 1983)
- Runners-up: 3 (1972, 1987, 1990)
- Minor premierships: 1 (1971)
- Wooden spoons: 4 (1976, 2022, 2023, 2024)

Kyogle Turkeys Rugby League Club is an Australian rugby league football club based in Kyogle, New South Wales in the Northern Rivers. They field both senior teams that compete in the Northern Rivers Rugby League competition and junior sides in the Group One competition.

== History ==
Although the Kyogle rugby league club was established in 1960, the sport had been played in the region for decades prior. Representative teams from Kyogle played various friendlies and cup matches against teams representing other nearby districts. The Turkeys competed in the Richmond League from 1960 until the competition's merger with the Clarence League to form the Group 1 Rugby League in 1966.

The club's emblem comes from the Bundjalung name for the area, with Kyogle derived from "kaiou gal", meaning "place of the brush turkey".

Kyogle claimed their first title under the guidance of captain-coach Peter Tonkin in 1971, winning the minor premiership before defeating the Lower Clarence Magpies 14-9 in the grand final.

They reached the grand final again the following year, however were beaten 19-6 in the grand final by the South Grafton Rebels.

Also in 1972, they set a record for the biggest winning margin in Country Rugby League, defeating Woodburn 141-3 in Kyogle, with halfback Peter McKenna scoring 78 points on his own.

With captain-coach Brian Purtell as captain-coach, the Turkeys claimed their second premiership in 1983, earning the right to host the grand final after defeating minor premiers Lower Clarence 24-23 in the major semi final before beating the Magpies again in the grand final, 14-12.

Further grand final appearances followed in 1987 and 1990, however they were beaten 22-6 by Lismore Marist Brothers and 38-29 by Casino respectively.

Despite regular semi final appearances, the Turkeys haven't returned to a grand final since 1990. The club has won multiple under 18s premierships, including 2005, 2014 and 2015.

Since 2015 the club has struggled due to changing demographics within the town and a reduction in local juniors. As a result, they have regularly finished near the bottom of the table, including wooden spoons in 2022, 2023 and 2024.

== Notable players ==
- Ken Nagas – Former Canberra Raiders (1992–2002) player.
- Nigel Roy – Former Illawarra Steelers (1993–94), North Sydney Bears (1995–99), Northern Eagles (2000) & London Broncos (2001–04) player.
- Will Matthews – Former Gold Coast Titans (2008–11, 2018–19) & St George Illawarra Dragons (2012–2017) player.
- Shannon Walker – Former Gold Coast Titans (2008–10) & Australia Rugby 7's (2012–2017) player.
- Jone Macilai – Former Fiji Bati (2008–09) player.
- David Grant – Former Canberra Raiders (1982–85) captain and Balmain Tigers (1978–81), Eastern Suburbs Roosters (1977) & South Sydney Rabbitohs (1976) player.

== Premierships ==
- First grade: 1971, 1983
- Reserve grade: 1987
- Under 18's: 2005, 2014, 2015

== See also ==
- List of rugby league clubs in Australia
- List of senior rugby league clubs in New South Wales
