= Luke Douglas =

Scotland international rugby league footballer

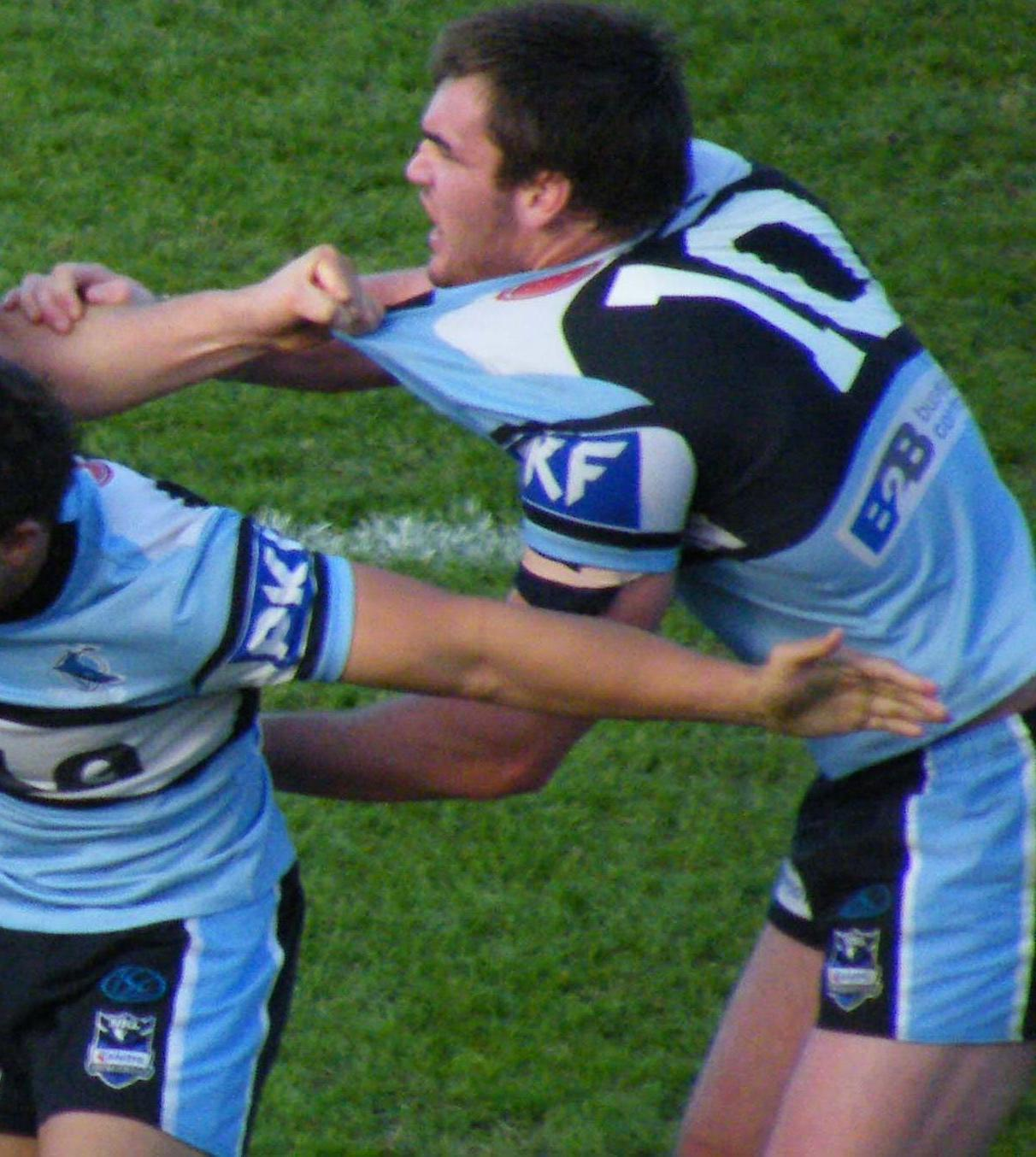

Personal information
- Full name: Luke Archibald Douglas
- Born: 12 May 1986 (age 40) Yamba, New South Wales, Australia

Playing information
- Height: 191 cm (6 ft 3 in)
- Weight: 112 kg (17 st 9 lb)
- Position: Prop
Club
Years	Team	Pld	T	G	FG	P
2006–11	Cronulla Sharks	146	10	0	0	40
2012–16	Gold Coast Titans	117	4	0	0	16
2017–19	St Helens	59	6	0	0	24
2019(loan)	→ Leigh Centurions	27	6	0	0	24
	Total	349	26	0	0	104
Representative
Years	Team	Pld	T	G	FG	P
2007–11	Prime Minister's XIII	3	2	0	0	8
2012	NSW Country	1	0	0	0	0
2013–17	Scotland	10	1	0	0	4

Luke Archibald Douglas (born 12 May 1986) is a Scotland international rugby league footballer who plays as a prop for Lower Clarence Magpies in the NRRRL.

Douglas played for the Cronulla-Sutherland Sharks and the Gold Coast Titans in the NRL from 2006 to 2016. He also played for St Helens in the Super League in 2017 and 2018, and on loan from the St. Helens at the Leigh Centurions in the 2019 Championship, after which he retired from the sport.

Through ancestral eligibility, he represented Scotland at the 2013 World Cup, 2016 Four Nations and the 2017 World Cup.

== Early career ==
Douglas was born in Yamba, New South Wales, Australia to parents Archibald Christopher (Chris) and Patricia (Trish) Douglas. He is of Scottish descent through his paternal grandfather, Archibald, who moved from Glasgow to Maclean, New South Wales. Douglas' brother is Australian rugby union representative Kane Douglas.

Douglas played junior rugby league for the Yamba Eagles and Lower Clarence Magpies.

== Cronulla-Sutherland Sharks ==
Douglas made his first-grade debut for Cronulla in its season-opener against the Brisbane Broncos in round 2, 2006.

In 2007, Douglas was selected for Country Origin but withdrew by claiming “injury” at the request of his club coach, Ricky Stuart. Controversially, Douglas then played 24 hours later for Cronulla.

In 2010, he was picked as 18th man for the New South Wales State of Origin team for the third match of the series, but he didn't play. He later played the only domestic representative match of his career for Country Origin in 2012.

Between his first grade debut in round 2, 2006 and round 23, 2014, inclusive, he never missed a first-grade match through injury or suspension. His run of 215 games straight is the NRL record for most consecutive appearances, and the most from debut. He surpassed the previous record of 194, held by Jason Taylor, on 10 March 2014 against his former club, Cronulla. His coach, John Cartwright, said his record was "remarkable, especially playing in the front row - he plays pretty big minutes as well."

On 20 April 2011, it was announced that Douglas had signed a three-year contract with the Gold Coast Titans.

Douglas’s unbroken streak of NRL matches since came to an end in August 2014 when he was one of several past and present Sharks players to accept a year-long ban, backdated to 21 November 2013, as part of ASADA's investigation into the club's controversial supplements program.

== Gold Coast Titans ==
After four turbulent years at the Titans, during which the club failed to qualify for the finals and was rocked by numerous scandals, Douglas departed the Gold Coast and signed a three-year deal with Super League club St Helens R.F.C.

== St Helens ==
On 25 January 2019, it was confirmed that St Helens had an agreed a one-month loan deal with Leigh for Douglas.
