= Jone Macilai (rugby league) =

Fiji international rugby league footballer

Personal information
- Born: 3 May 1983 (age 41); Fiji

Playing information
- Position: Centre
Representative
Years	Team	Pld	T	G	FG	P
2008–09	Fiji	4	0	0	0	0

Jone Macilai, also known by the nickname of "Johnny", is a Fijian rugby league footballer who is notable for playing for the Fiji Bati in the 2008 Rugby League World Cup and the 2009 Pacific Cup. He now plays for the Ormeau Shearers after previously playing for Kyogle Turkeys A-Grade team, Fassifern RLFC, Murwillumbah Mustangs and the Coral Coast Cowboys.
