= Wickham Wasps =

Rugby League Club in Australia

Club information
- Full name: Wickham Wasps Rugby League Club
- Colours: Yellow; Navy; Black; White
- Founded: 1991

Current details
- Ground: Ralph Geronzi Park, Wickham
- Competition: Pilbara Rugby League

Records
- Premierships: 7 (1997, 1999, 2001, 2006, 2012, 2016, 2017)

Wickham Wasps Rugby League Club is an Australian rugby league club from Wickham, Western Australia. They conduct teams for Juniors, Seniors and Ladies teams to compete in the Pilbara Rugby League competition.

== See also ==
- Rugby league in Western Australia
