= Corowa Cougars =

Australian rugby league football club

Corowa Cougars RLFC
Club information
- Full name: Corowa Cougars; Rugby League; Football Club
- Colours: Black; White
- Founded: 1987
- Exited: 2009
- Readmitted: 2012

details
- Ground: Corowa Airfield, Corowa
- CEO: Bob Dowie
- Competition: Goulburn Murray Rugby League

Records
- Premierships: 7 (1991, 1992, 1999, 2001, 2004, 2005, 2006)
- Runners-up: 9 (1993, 1994, 1995, 1997, 2002, 2003, 2014, 2016, 2019)

Corowa Cougars Rugby League Football Club is an Australian rugby league football club based on the New South Wales and Victorian border. The club is based at Corowa, New South Wales formed in late 1986. They conduct senior men's and women's teams.

== Notable Juniors ==
- Aaron Murphy
- Anthony Murphy
- Jade Stubbs
- Jannssen O’Malley
- Shaun Boyer

== See also ==
- Rugby league in New South Wales
- Rugby league in Victoria
