= Hastings District Rugby League =

Australian sports league

Hastings Rugby Football League
- Sport: Rugby league
- Formerly known as: Group 3 Saturday League
- Instituted: 1920
- Inaugural season: 1920
- President: Geoff Connor
- Number of teams: 12
- Country: Australia
- Premiers: Kendall Blues (2025) ({{{season}}})
- Most titles: Beechwood Shamrocks (15 titles)
- Related competition: Group 3 Rugby League

The Hastings District Rugby League is a community rugby league competition. It features amateur teams from smaller towns around the Mid-North Coast and runs as a community competition similar to the Barwon Darling Rugby League and the Western Riverina Community Cup.

== History ==
The Hastings League was established in 1920 as a rugby league competition on the Mid-North Coast of New South Wales. The competition partnered with the Group 3 Rugby League in the 1990s as the Group 3 Saturday League, but has since returned to the Hastings League name and remains separate from Group 3.

In 2018, the competition began a ladies tackle grade. This competition has now expanded to allow invitees from other Groups, become independent of the competition, and is known as the North Coast Women's Rugby League.

The competition was due to celebrate its centenary season in 2020 but this was delayed until 2021 by the COVID-19 pandemic.

In 2025, clubs from neighbouring Group 2 joined the competition (Bellingen Valley-Dorrigo and Orara Valley), upon which the competition, then up to twelve clubs, split into two divisions.

== Clubs ==
| Clubs | Moniker | City/Town | Home Ground | Titles |
Northern Division
| Bellingen Dorrigo | Magpies | Bellingen/Dorrigo | Bellingen Park | None |
| Bowraville | Tigers | Bowraville, New South Wales | Bowraville Sports Ground | None |
| Lower Macleay | Magpies | Smithtown, New South Wales | Smithtown Oval | 1 |
| Orara Valley | Axemen | Coffs Harbour (Coramba) | Coramba Sportsground | None |
| South West Rocks | Marlins | South West Rocks, New South Wales | South West Rocks Sports Ground | 2 |
Southern Division
| Beechwood | Shamrocks | Wauchope, New South Wales (Beechwood) | Beechwood Oval | 14 |
| Comboyne | Tigers | Comboyne, New South Wales | Comboyne Showground | 11 |
| Harrington (in recess) | Hurricanes | Harrington, New South Wales | Esmond Hogan Oval | None |
| Kendall | Blues | Kendall, New South Wales | Kendall Showground | 9 |
| Lake Cathie | Raiders | Lake Cathie, New South Wales | Lake Cathie Sporting Complex | 1 |
| Laurieton Hotel | Stingrays | Camden Haven, New South Wales (Laurieton) | Laurieton Oval | 1 |
| Long Flat | Dragons | Long Flat, New South Wales | Long Flat Oval | 13 |

== Former clubs ==
- Bellangry (3 titles)
- Byabarra (3 titles)
- Camden Haven (1 title)
- Crescent Head (1 title)
- Gloucester Magpies (No titles)
- Macquarie Hotel (3 titles)
- Port Macquarie Boardriders (1 title)
- Port RSL (No Titles)
- Royal Hotel (3 titles)
- Wauchope (1 title)
- Wauchope Co-op (5 titles)
- Wilson River (No Titles)

== Premiers ==
=== Men's ===
| Season | Premiers | Score | Runners-up |
|---|---|---|---|
1920–2013 Premiers Unknown
| 2014 | Kendall | 34–20 | Comboyne |
| 2015 | South West Rocks | 28–14 | Lower Macleay |
| 2016 | Comboyne | 29–26 | Kendall |
| 2017 | Kendall | 28–14 | Comboyne |
| 2018 | Long Flat | 18–12 | Laurieton Hotel |
| 2019 | South West Rocks | 39-12 | Laurieton Hotel |
| 2020 | No Premiers crowned due to COVID-19 pandemic | | |
| 2021 | No Premiers crowned due to COVID-19 pandemic | | |
| 2022 | Laurieton Hotel | 28–4 | Long Flat |
| 2023 | Kendall | 34–10 | Beechwood |

=== Ladies Tackle ===
| Season | Premiers | Score | Runners-up |
Hastings League
| 2018 | Beechwood | 20–10 | Kendall |
| 2019 | Beechwood | 44–4 | South West Rocks |
| 2020 | No Premiers crowned due to COVID-19 pandemic | | |
| 2021 | No Premiers crowned due to COVID-19 pandemic | | |
| 2022 | Replaced by North Coast Women's Rugby League | | |

== North Coast Women's Rugby League ==
In 2018, the Hastings League competition began a ladies tackle grade. The competition has expanded to allow invitees from other Groups, become independent of the Hastings competition, and is operating under a pilot program as the North Coast Women's Rugby League.

| Season | Premiers | Score | Runners-up |
North Coast Women's Rugby League
| 2022 | Macleay Valley | 26–10 | Long Flat |
