= Wee Waa Panthers =

Australian rugby league football club

Club information
- Full name: Wee Waa Panthers Rugby League Football Club
- Colours: Green; Gold

Current details
- Ground: Cook Oval
- Competition: Group 4 Rugby League

Records
- Premierships: 8

Wee Waa Panthers Rugby League Club is an Australian rugby league football club based in Wee Waa, New South Wales formed in the late 1980s. They conduct teams for both junior and senior teams.

The club has competed in the Group 4 Rugby League competition from 1980-1994, 1996-2010, 2012-2014, 2017 and 2024-present.

== Notable Juniors ==
- Jamie Lyon (2000- Parramatta Eels & Manly Sea Eagles)
