= George Tooke Shield =

Rugby league competition in Australia

- Current season or competition: 2026 Canberra Rugby League
- Sport: Rugby league
- Instituted: 1927
- Inaugural season: 1927
- Number of teams: 8
- Country: Australia
- Premiers: Harden Hawks (2026)
- Most titles: Bungendore Tigers (10 titles)
- Broadcast partner: BarTV Sports

The George Tooke Shield is a rugby league competition in southern New South Wales and the Australian Capital Territory. Founded in 1927, the competition is a part of the broader Canberra Rugby League Division of the New South Wales Rugby League.

== Senior Grade clubs ==
With the advent of the ACTRL in 1982, the George Tooke Shield effectively became the continuation of the Group 8 competition. Note: Other Clubs from the Canberra Rugby League enter teams in Second Division Lower Grades

Club	Colours	City/Suburb	Home venue	Est.	Second Division Seasons	Second Division Premierships	
Club	Colours	City/Suburb	Home venue	Est.	Second Division Seasons	Total	Most recent
Binalong Brahmans		Binalong	Binalong Recreation Ground	1930	2000–05, 2007, 2010–11, 2013–14, 2017–19, 2021–2025	3	2014
Boorowa Rovers		Boorowa	Boorowa Showground	1998	2005–06, 2010–19, 2021–present	1	2023
Bungendore Tigers		Bungendore	Mick Sherd Oval	1952	1952, 1955–70, 1977–81, 1988–present	9	2025
Crookwell Green Devils		Crookwell	Crookwell Memorial Oval	1925	1994–19, 2021–present	5	2022
Googong Goannas		Googong	Duncan Playing Fields	2024	2025–present	0	—
Harden-Murrumburrah Hawks		Harden	McLean Oval	1920	2009–19, 2021–present	3	2026
North Canberra Bears		Canberra (Kaleen)	Kaleen Enclosed Oval	1971	1982, 1984–88, 2016–19, 2021–present	3	2019
Snowy River Bears		Jindabyne	JJ Connors Oval	1977	1997–02, 2025–present	0	—
University of Canberra Stars		Canberra (Holt)	Raiders Belconnen	2010	2013, 2017–19, 2021–present	0	—

== Former clubs ==
Club	Colours	City	George Tooke Shield Seasons	Reason	George Tooke Shield Premierships	
Club	Colours	City	George Tooke Shield Seasons	Reason	Total	Last
George Tooke Shield
ADFA Knights		Canberra	2011, 2015–18	Folded	0	—
Boomanulla Raiders		Canberra	1979–83, 1989–16, 2019, 2021–present	Folded	1	1991
Binalong Brahmans		Binalong	2000–05, 2007, 2010–11, 2013–14, 2017–19, 2021–2023, 2025	1930	3	2014
Braidwood Bears		Braidwood	1995–96, 1999–00, 2004–06, 2008–11, 2016	Folded	0	—
Burrangong Bears		Young	1942–2021, 2023	In recess	0	—
Cooma United Stallions		Cooma	2001–04	Moved to Group 16 Premiership	2	2003
Cootamundra Bulldogs		Cootamundra	2021–24	Moved back to Group 9	0	—
Duntroon Titans		Canberra	2005–07	Folded	0	—
East Canberra Tigers		Canberra	1995, 1999	Folded	0	—
Gordon Highlanders		Goulburn	2008–11, 2013, 2020	Folded	1	2020
Goulburn Exchange Rabbitohs		Goulburn	1995–97, 1999–00, 2002–10, 2012	Folded	1	1996
Gunning Roos						
Harman Seadogs		Canberra	1999–11	Folded	0	—
Hall Hornets		Canberra	2011–12	Folded	1	2012
Jerrabomberra Diggers		Queanbeyan	1995, 1997–98	Folded	0	—
Northern Power			2000	Folded	0	—
Sails Pirates		Canberra	1997	Folded	0	—
South Pacific			1998	Folded	0	—
South Tuggeranong Knights		Canberra	1998–02	Merged with Tuggeranong United Buffaloes & Valley Dragons to form Tuggeranong Bushrangers	1	2000
Southwest Brahmans		Binalong	2008	Demerged to form Harden Hawks and Binalong Brahmans	0	—
Tuggeranong Bushrangers		Canberra	2003–05, 2007–08	Pulled team out of Second Division	1	2007
University Scholars		Canberra	1998, 2002–05	Moved to Canberra Raiders Cup as North Belconnen Scholars	1	2004
Valley Dragons		Canberra	1999–01	Moved to Canberra Raiders Cup	0	—
Valley Statesmen		Canberra	1998–06	Folded	0	—
West Belconnen Warriors		Canberra	2006–08, 2010	Pulled team out of Second Division	0	—
Yass Magpies		Yass	1995–98, 2000, 2013–14	Moved to Canberra Raiders Cup	3	1998

== George Tooke Shield Grand Finals ==
Year	Premiers	Score	Runners-up	Match Information
Year	Premiers	Score	Runners-up	Date	Venue	Referee
Federal Capital Territory and District Rugby League (1927–36)
1927	Hall	11 – 2	Duntroon	24 September 1927	Duntroon Sports Ground, Canberra
1928	Acton Rovers	7 – 3	Russell Hill	1 September 1928	Manuka Oval, Canberra	I. Lott
1929	South City	13 – 2	Hall
1930	West City	6 – 5	Hall	16 August 1930
1931	North City	7 – 0	South City
1932	(2) West City	11 – 0	North City	17 September 1932	Acton, Canberra	C. Parker
1933	(2) South City	7 – 5	Hall	2 September 1933	Manuka Oval, Canberra
1934	(3) South City	9 – 8	Molonglo	1 September 1934		Stevens
1935	(4) South City	8 – 7	Molonglo
1936	Queanbeyan United Blues (R)	6 – 0	Canberra City	19 September 1936	Northbourne Oval, Canberra	J. Baker
1937	No Second Division Competition
1938	No Second Division Competition
1939	No Second Division Competition
1940	No Group Competition Due to World War II
1941	No Group Competition Due to World War II
1942	No Group Competition Due to World War II
1943	No Group Competition Due to World War II
1944	No Group Competition Due to World War II
1945	No Group Competition Due to World War II
ACT District Rugby League (1946–76)
1946	(2) North City	15 – 5	West City	22 September 1946	Queanbeyan Showground, Queanbeyan
1947	(3) North City	6 – 3	Causeway Rovers	6 September 1947
1948	(4) North City	15 – 10	Causeway Rovers	28 August 1948	Northbourne Oval, Canberra
1949	(5) North City	8 – 0	Causeway Rovers	2 October 1949	Northbourne Oval, Canberra	L. Lees
1950	(6) North City	10 – 9	Causeway Rovers
1951	Causeway Rovers	10 – 9	North City
1952	Captains Flat Redmen	11 – 10	Causeway Rovers	21 September 1952	Northbourne Oval, Canberra
1953	(7) North City	21 – 2	Causeway Rovers	30 August 1953	Manuka Oval, Canberra	K. Gibb
1954	No Second Division Competition
1955	No Second Division Competition
1956	No Second Division Competition
1957	No Second Division Competition
1958	No Second Division Competition
1959	No Second Division Competition
1960	No Second Division Competition
1961	No Second Division Competition
1962	No Second Division Competition
1963	No Second Division Competition
1964	Harman	20 – 15	Canberra Rovers	23 August 1964	Queanbeyan Showground, Queanbeyan
1965	Royal Australian Air Force	11 – 3	Captains Flat Redmen
1966	Bungendore Tigers	9 – 7	Braidwood Bears	4 September 1966	Queanbeyan Showground, Queanbeyan
1967	Queanbeyan Kangaroos	11 – 9	Bungendore Tigers	27 August 1967	Seiffert Oval, Queanbeyan
1968	(2) Captains Flat Redmen	4 – 3	Bungendore Tigers	25 August 1968	Northbourne Oval, Canberra
1969	Woden Valley Rams	30 – 4	ANU-Harman	23 August 1969	Seiffert Oval, Queanbeyan
1970	(3) Captains Flat Redmen	12 – 7	Woden Valley Rams	30 August 1970	Seiffert Oval, Queanbeyan
1971	(4) Captains Flat Redmen	25 – 8	St Christophers Saints	5 September 1971	Northbourne Oval, Canberra	L. Petherbridge
1972	North Canberra Bears	39 – 16	Captains Flat Redmen	10 September 1972	Manuka Oval, Canberra	B. Chapman
1973	West Canberra Magpies	25 – 6	Belconnen United Panthers	9 September 1973	Manuka Oval, Canberra
1974	(2) Bungendore Tigers	5 – 3	Australian National University	8 September 1974	Manuka Oval, Canberra	A. Laird
1975	Harman Sailors	13 – 4	West Canberra Magpies	14 September 1975	Manuka Oval, Canberra
1976	Canberra Camels	12 – 7	Harman Sailors	29 August 1976	Northbourne Oval, Canberra
Group 19 Second Division (1977–79)
1977	(2) Canberra Camels	7 – 5	Captains Flat Redmen	4 September 1977	Manuka Oval, Canberra
1978	(5) Captains Flat Redmen	16 – 3	Canberra Camels	3 September 1978	Northbourne Oval, Canberra
1979	(6) Captains Flat Redmen	21 – 7	Australian National University	23 September 1979	Northbourne Oval, Canberra	J. Ellis
ACT Rugby League Second Division (1980–85)
1980	(3) Canberra Camels	15 – 10	Captains Flat Redmen	27 September 1980	Northbourne Oval, Canberra	N. Wardle
1981	(7) Captains Flat Redmen	15 – 5	Canberra Camels	6 September 1981	Northbourne Oval, Canberra	J. Ellis
1982	Lakes United Sharks	18 – 5	North Canberra Bears	19 September 1982	Workers Arena, Goulburn	R. Cambridge
1983	Weston Creek Rabbitohs	18 – 6	Harman Super Sailors	18 September 1983	Seiffert Oval, Queanbeyan	R. Lloyd
1984	(2) Harman Super Sailors	28 – 8	North Canberra Bears	16 September 1984	Northbourne Oval, Canberra	D. Sparks
1985	(4) Ambassador Camels	38 – 6	North Canberra Bears	8 September 1985	Northbourne Oval, Canberra	D. Sparks
Canberra Cup (1986–98)
1986	Yass United Magpies	13 – 6	Ambassador Camels	21 September 1986	Northbourne Oval, Canberra	A. Thompson
1987	Gunning Kangaroos	10 – 6	Valley Statesmen	30 August 1987	Northbourne Oval, Canberra	G. Jones
1988	Valley Statesmen	7 – 2	Queanbeyan RSL Diggers	28 August 1988	Northbourne Oval, Canberra	G. Jones
1989	Queanbeyan RSL Diggers	35 – 2	Canberra Giants	17 September 1989	Northbourne Oval, Canberra	N. Maher
1990	(2) Yass United Magpies	26 – 18	Bungendore Tigers	15 September 1990	Seiffert Oval, Queanbeyan	G. Jones
1991	Bogong Warriors	34 – 16	Valley Dragons	14 September 1991	Seiffert Oval, Queanbeyan	A. Thompson
1992	Valley Dragons	24 – 20	Valley Statesmen	13 September 1992	Seiffert Oval, Queanbeyan	A. Thompson
1993	(2) Jerrabomberra Diggers	28 – 8	Bogong Warriors	12 September 1993	Seiffert Oval, Queanbeyan	R. Cranston
1994	Crookwell Green Devils	20 – 12	Jerrabomberra Diggers	27 August 1994	Northbourne Oval, Canberra	J. Elliott
1994	East Canberra Tigers	15 – 8	Canberra Gladiators	27 August 1994	Northbourne Oval, Canberra	B. Cummins
1995	Sails Pirates	6 – 4	Bungendore Tigers	2 September 1995	Seiffert Oval, Queanbeyan	B. Cummins
1996	(3) Harman Sailors	14 – 12	Sails Pirates			R. Gallacher
1997	(2) Valley Statesmen	20 – 16	South Tuggeranong Knights	30 August 1997	Boomanulla Oval, Canberra	B. Cobb
1998	(3) Bungendore Tigers	30 – 6	Goulburn Stockmen			G. Pfeiffer
George Tooke Shield (1995–Present)
1995	(3) Yass United Magpies	15 – 4	Jerrabomberra Diggers	2 September 1995	Seiffert Oval, Queanbeyan	R. Cranston
1996	Goulburn Exchange Rabbitohs	16 – 6	Crookwell Green Devils			R. Cranston
1997	(4) Yass United Magpies	32 – 12	Sails Pirates	30 August 1997	Boomanulla Oval, Canberra	G. Pfeiffer
1998	(5) Yass United Magpies	30 – 8	South Tuggeranong Knights			B. Bolton
1999	(4) Bungendore Tigers	17 – 16	Crookwell Green Devils	12 September 1999	Seiffert Oval, Queanbeyan	B. Bolton
2000	South Tuggeranong Knights	20 – 12	Goulburn Exchange Rabbitohs			I. Freeman
2001	(5) Bungendore Tigers	26 – 14	South Tuggeranong Knights		Seiffert Oval, Queanbeyan	R. Gallacher
2002	Cooma United Stallions	18 – 16	Crookwell Green Devils	15 September 2002	Seiffert Oval, Queanbeyan	R. Gallacher
2003	(2) Cooma United Stallions	16 – 14	Binalong Brahmans	31 August 2003	Seiffert Oval, Queanbeyan	D. Feenan
2004	University Scholars	28 – 8	Boomanulla Raiders	29 August 2004	Seiffert Oval, Queanbeyan	D. Feenan
2005	(2) Crookwell Green Devils	34 – 22	Tuggeranong Valley Bushrangers (C)	28 August 2005	Seiffert Oval, Queanbeyan	S. Johnson
2006	(3) Crookwell Green Devils	14 – 8	Bungendore Tigers	3 September 2006	Seiffert Oval, Queanbeyan	R. Moore
2007	Tuggeranong Valley Bushrangers (C)	17 – 14	Bungendore Tigers	9 September 2007	Seiffert Oval, Queanbeyan	R. Moore
2008	(6) Bungendore Tigers	23 – 14	Southwest Brahmans	28 September 2008	Seiffert Oval, Queanbeyan	M. Dagwell
2009	Harden-Murrumburrah Hawks	17 – 14	Bungendore Tigers	27 September 2009	Seiffert Oval, Queanbeyan	J. Tennent
2010	Binalong Brahmans	25 – 12	Harden-Murrumburrah Hawks	19 September 2010	Seiffert Oval, Queanbeyan	J. West
2011	(7) Bungendore Tigers	28 – 22	Binalong Brahmans	11 September 2011	Seiffert Oval, Queanbeyan	M. Forster
2012	Hall Hornets	34 – 12	Bungendore Tigers	9 September 2012	Raiders Belconnen, Canberra	T. Flynn
2013	(2) Binalong Brahmans	32 – 6	Harden-Murrumburrah Hawks	31 August 2013	Binalong Recreation Ground, Binalong	M. Jones
2014	(3) Binalong Brahmans	30 – 4	Harden-Murrumburrah Hawks	30 August 2014	Binalong Recreation Ground, Binalong	R. Moore
2015	(8) Bungendore Tigers	28 – 12	Yass United Magpies	29 August 2015	Mick Sherd Oval, Bungendore	H. Fallah
2016	(2) North Canberra Bears	17 – 12	Harden-Murrumburrah Hawks	10 September 2016	McLean Oval, Harden	H. Fallah
2017	(2) Harden-Murrumburrah Hawks	24 – 20	Crookwell Green Devils	9 September 2017	Crookwell Memorial Oval, Crookwell	T. Flynn
2018	(4) Crookwell Green Devils	22 – 16	North Canberra Bears	8 September 2018	Crookwell Memorial Oval, Crookwell	G. Widdowson
2019	(3) North Canberra Bears	24 – 16	Crookwell Green Devils	14 September 2019	Jamison Oval, Canberra	G. Widdowson
2020	Gordon Highlanders	24 – 10	Bungendore Tigers	26 September 2020	Mick Sherd Oval, Bungendore	L. Barrow
2021	Competition Suspended Due to Covid-19
2022	(5) Crookwell Green Devils	14 – 10	Bungendore Tigers	3 September 2022	Mick Sherd Oval, Bungendore	D. Charman
2023	Boorowa Rovers	22 – 8	Crookwell Green Devils	9 September 2023	Crookwell Memorial Oval, Crookwell	D. Charman
2024	(9) Bungendore Tigers	30 – 10	Harden-Murrumburrah Hawks	31 August 2024	Mick Sherd Oval, Bungendore	H. Fallah
2025	(10) Bungendore Tigers	18 – 16	Harden-Murrumburrah Hawks	20 September 2025	Mick Sherd Oval, Bungendore	L. Barrow
2026	(3) Harden-Murrumburrah Hawks	20 – 6	North Canberra Bears	12 September 2026	McLean Oval, Harden

=== Team performance ===
Team	Winners	Runners-up	Years won	Years runner-up
Bungendore Tigers	10	10	1966, 1974, 1998, 1999, 2001, 2008, 2011, 2015, 2024, 2025	1967, 1968, 1990, 1995, 2006, 2007, 2009, 2012, 2020, 2022
Captains Flat Redmen	7	4	1952, 1968, 1970, 1971, 1978, 1979, 1981	1965, 1972, 1977, 1980
North City	7	3	1931, 1946, 1947, 1948, 1949, 1950, 1953	1932, 1936, 1951
Crookwell Green Devils	5	6	1994, 2005, 2006, 2018, 2022	1996, 1999, 2002, 2017, 2019, 2023
Yass United Magpies	5	1	1986, 1990, 1995, 1997, 1998	2015
Ambassador Camels	4	3	1976, 1977, 1980, 1985	1978, 1981, 1986
South City	4	1	1929, 1933, 1934, 1935	1931
Harden-Murrumburrah Hawks	3	6	2009, 2017, 2026	2010, 2013, 2014, 2016, 2024, 2025
North Canberra Bears	3	5	1972, 2016, 2019	1982, 1984, 1985, 2018, 2026
Harman Sailors	3	2	1975, 1984, 1996	1976, 1983
Binalong Brahmans	3	2	2010, 2013, 2014	2003, 2011
Jerrabomberra Diggers	2	3	1989, 1993	1988, 1994, 1995
Valley Statesmen	2	2	1988, 1997	1987, 1992
West City	2	1	1930, 1932	1946
Cooma United Stallions	2	0	2002, 2003	–
Canberra Rovers	1	7	1951	1947, 1948, 1949, 1950, 1952, 1953, 1964
Hall	1	3	1927	1929, 1930, 1933
South Tuggeranong Knights	1	3	2000	1997, 1998, 2001
Boomanulla Raiders	1	2	1991	1993, 2004
Sails Pirates	1	2	1995	1996, 1997
Woden Valley Rams	1	1	1969	1970
West Canberra Magpies	1	1	1973	1975
Valley Dragons	1	1	1992	1991
Goulburn Exchange Rabbitohs	1	1	1996	2000
Tuggeranong Valley Bushrangers (C)	1	1	2007	2005
Acton Rovers	1	0	1928	–
Queanbeyan United Blues (R)	1	0	1936	–
Harman/Navy	1	0	1964	–
Royal Australian Air Force	1	0	1965	–
Queanbeyan Kangaroos	1	0	1967	–
Lakes United Sharks	1	0	1982	–
Weston Creek Rabbitohs	1	0	1983	–
Gunning Roos	1	0	1987	–
East Canberra Tigers	1	0	1994	–
Belconnen United Scholars	1	0	2004	–
Hall Hornets	1	0	2012	–
Gordon Highlanders	1	0	2020	–
Boorowa Rovers	1	0	2023	–
Molonglo	0	2	–	1934, 1935
Australian National University	0	2	–	1974, 1979
Duntroon	0	1	–	1927
Russell Hill	0	1	–	1928
Braidwood Bears	0	1	–	1966
ANU-Harman	0	1	–	1969
South Woden Saints	0	1	–	1971
Belconnen United Panthers	0	1	–	1973
Canberra Giants	0	1	–	1989
Canberra Gladiators	0	1	–	1994
Goulburn Stockmen	0	1	–	1998
Southwest Brahmans	0	1	–	2008

== Second Division Under 18/19s Grand Finals ==
Year	Premiers	Score	Runners-up	Match Information
Year	Premiers	Score	Runners-up	Date	Venue	Referee
George Tooke Shield Under 18s (1995–96)
1995	East Canberra Tigers (U18s)	30 – 6	Yass United Magpies (U18s)	2 September 1995	Seiffert Oval, Queanbeyan	B. Northey
1996	Goulburn Exchange Rabbitohs (U18s)	22 – 0	Yass United Magpies (U18s)			M. Cutler
1997	No Second Division Under 18s Competition
1998	No Second Division Under 18s Competition
1999	No Second Division Under 18s Competition
2000	No Second Division Under 18s Competition
2001	No Second Division Under 18s Competition
2002	No Second Division Under 18s Competition
2003	No Second Division Under 18s Competition
2004	No Second Division Under 18s Competition
2005	No Second Division Under 18s Competition
2006	No Second Division Under 18s Competition
2007	No Second Division Under 18s Competition
2008	No Second Division Under 18s Competition
2009	No Second Division Under 18s Competition
2010	No Second Division Under 18s Competition
Canberra Raiders Cup Under 18s Division 2 (2011–15)
2011	Queanbeyan Kangaroos (U18s B)	32 – 26	Queanbeyan United Blues (U18s B)	11 September 2011	Seiffert Oval, Queanbeyan	A. Williams
2012	Bungendore Tigers (U18s)	28 – 12	Tuggeranong Valley Bushrangers (U18s B)	23 September 2012	Seiffert Oval, Queanbeyan	J. West
2013	Gungahlin Bulls (U18s B)	24 – 16	Queanbeyan Kangaroos (U18s B)	1 September 2013	Seiffert Oval, Queanbeyan	L. Barrow
2014	Tuggeranong Valley Bushrangers (U18s B)	30 – 6	Gungahlin Bulls (U18s B)	7 September 2014	Seiffert Oval, Queanbeyan	J. Gould
2015	(2) Gungahlin Bulls	20 – 14	Tuggeranong Valley Bushrangers (U18s B)	6 September 2015	Seiffert Oval, Queanbeyan	L. Barrow
George Tooke Shield Youth League (2016–18)
2016	(2) Tuggeranong Valley Bushrangers (U18s B)	14 – 4	Harden-Murrumburrah Hawks (U18s)	10 September 2016	McLean Oval, Harden	J. Gould
2017	Harden-Murrumburrah Hawks (U18s)	36 – 0	North Canberra Bears (U18s)	9 September 2017	Crookwell Memorial Oval, Crookwell	L. Barrow
2018	Yass United Magpies	10 – 2	Harden-Boorowa	8 September 2018	Crookwell Memorial Oval, Crookwell	J. Wharehinga
Canberra Raiders Cup Under 19s Division 2 (2019–Present)
2019	(3) Tuggeranong Valley Bushrangers (U19s)	15 – 12	North Canberra Bears (U19s)	14 September 2019	Jamison Oval, Canberra	C. Davis
2020	No Competition Due to COVID-19
2021	No Second Division Under 19s Competition
2022	Woden Valley Rams (U19s)	34 – 14	Tuggeranong Valley Bushrangers (U19s)	3 September 2022	Mick Sherd Oval, Bungendore	J. Black
2023	No Second Division Under 19s Competition

=== Team performance ===
Team	Winners	Runners-up	Years won	Years runner-up
Tuggeranong Valley Bushrangers (U19s, U18s B)	3	3	2014, 2016, 2019	2012, 2015, 2022
Gungahlin Bulls (U18s B)	2	1	2013, 2015	2014
Yass United Magpies (U18s)	1	2	2018	1995, 1996
Queanbeyan Kangaroos (U18s B)	1	1	2011	2013
Harden-Murrumburrah Hawks (U18s)	1	1	2017	2016
East Canberra Tigers	1	0	1995	–
Goulburn Exchange Rabbitohs	1	0	1996	–
Bungendore Tigers	1	0	2012	–
Woden Valley Rams (U19s)	1	0	2022	–
North Canberra Bears (U19s, U18s)	0	2	–	2017, 2019
Queanbeyan United Blues (U18s B)	0	1	–	2011
Harden-Boorowa	0	1	–	2018

== Second Division (George Tooke Shield) Ladies League Tag ==
Year	Premiers	Score	Runners-up	Match Information
Year	Premiers	Score	Runners-up	Date	Venue	Referee
George Tooke Shield Touch Premiership (2014)
2014	Binalong Jersey Girls (T)	7 – 2	Harden-Murrumburrah Hawkettes (T)	30 August 2014	Binalong Recreation Ground, Binalong
George Tooke Shield Ladies League Tag (2015–Present)
2015	Bungendore Tigerettes (LLT)	10 – 8	Harden-Murrumburrah Hawkettes (LLT)	29 August 2015	Mick Sherd Oval, Bungendore	A. O'Brien
2016	Harden-Murrumburrah Hawkettes (LLT)	7 – 6	Bungendore Tigerettes (LLT)	10 September 2016	McLean Oval, Harden	A. O'Brien
2017	(2) Bungendore Tigerettes (LLT)	28 – 16	Harden-Murrumburrah Hawkettes (LLT)	9 September 2017	Crookwell Memorial Oval, Crookwell	A. O'Brien
2018	(2) Harden-Murrumburrah Hawkettes (LLT)	14 – 10	Bungendore Tigerettes (LLT)	8 September 2018	Crookwell Memorial Oval, Crookwell	J. Black
2019	(3) Harden-Murrumburrah Hawkettes (LLT)	34 – 6	Crookwell She Devils (LLT)	14 September 2019	Jamison Oval, Canberra	A. Richardson
2020	Burrangong Bears (LLT)	20 – 14	Bungendore Tigerettes (LLT)	26 September 2020	Mick Sherd Oval, Bungendore	A. Richardson
2021	Competition Suspended Due to Covid-19
2022	(4) Harden-Murrumburrah Hawkettes (LLT)	28 – 2	Boorowa Roverettes (LLT)	3 September 2022	Mick Sherd Oval, Bungendore	G. Doherty
2023	(5) Harden-Murrumburrah Hawkettes (LLT)	10 – 0	Cootamundra Bullettes (LLT)	9 September 2023	Crookwell Memorial Oval, Crookwell	A. Batten
2024	(6) Harden-Murrumburrah Hawkettes (LLT)	10 – 6	Crookwell She Devils (LLT)	31 August 2024	Mick Sherd Oval, Bungendore	D. McKenzie
2025	(7) Harden-Murrumburrah Hawkettes (LLT)	20 – 18	Crookwell She Devils (LLT)	20 September 2025	Mick Sherd Oval, Bungendore	R. Keen

=== Team performance ===
Team	Winners	Runners-up	Years won	Years runner-up
Harden-Murrumburrah Hawkettes (LLT, T)	7	3	2016, 2018, 2019, 2022, 2023, 2024, 2025	2014, 2015, 2017
Bungendore Tigerettes (LLT)	2	3	2015, 2017	2016, 2018, 2020
Binalong Jersey Girls (LLT, T)	1	0	2014	–
Burrangong Bears (LLT)	1	0	2020	–
Crookwell She Devils (LLT)	0	3	–	2019, 2024, 2025
Boorowa Roverettes (LLT)	0	1	–	2022
Cootamundra Bullettes (LLT)	0	1	–	2023

== Second Division Women's Tackle ==
Year	Premiers	Score	Runners-up	Match Information
Year	Premiers	Score	Runners-up	Date	Venue	Referee
Katrina Fanning Cup (2022–Present)
2022	Harden-Murrumburrah Worhawks (W)	10 – 4	South Coast United Marlins (W)	3 September 2022	Mick Sherd Oval, Bungendore	M. Bayley
2023	Queanbeyan United Blues (W)	32 – 14	Harden-Murrumburrah Worhawks (W)	9 September 2023	Crookwell Memorial Oval, Crookwell	J. Severs

=== Team performance ===
Team	Winners	Runners-up	Years won	Years runner-up
Harden-Murrumburrah Worhawks (W)	1	1	2022	2023
Queanbeyan United Blues (W)	1	0	2023	–
South Coast United Marlins (W)	0	1	–	2022
