= East Hills Bulldogs =

Australian rugby league club, based in East Hills, NSW

Club information
- Full name: East Hills Bulldogs Rugby League Football Club
- Colours: Light Blue; White

Current details
- Ground(s): Smith Park, East Hills
- CEO: Nathan Armstrong
- Competition: Canterbury Bankstown Rugby League

Records
- Premierships: 1 (1965)

East Hills Rugby League Football Club is an Australian rugby league football club based in East Hills, New South Wales. They conduct teams for junior, senior and women tag teams.
