= Mittagong Lions =

Australian rugby league club, based in Mittagong, NSW

Club information
- Full name: Mittagong Lions Rugby League Football Club
- Short name: Mitta
- Colours: Green; Gold
- Founded: 1914; 111 years ago

Current details
- Ground(s): Mittagong Sports Ground, Mittagong
- Competition: Group 6 Rugby League

Records
- Premierships: 7 (1945, 1959, 1962, 1963, 1964, 1967, 1988, 1991)

Mittagong Lions Rugby League Football Club is an Australian rugby league football club based in Mittagong, New South Wales. Originally a rugby union club in the late 19th century, Mittagong was a founding member of the Berrima District Rugby League in 1914, just prior to the outbreak of the First World War.

== Notable players ==
- Daniel Alvaro (2015- Parramatta Eels)
- Jeremy Latimore (2009-19, various clubs)
- Bryson Goodwin (2021-)
