= Gosford Kariong Storm =

Australian rugby league club, based on the Central Coast, NSW, Australia

Club information
- Full name: Gosford Kariong Storm
- Nickname(s): Storm, Stormers, Storms, GKS
- Colours: Purple, Gold, White
- Founded: 1947; 79 years ago
- Website: http://www.sportingpulse.com/club_info.cgi?client=7-2377-21200-0-0

Current details
- Ground: Carrington St Oval, Narara NSW
- Competition: Central Coast Rugby League

The Gosford Kariong Storm (formally known as Gosford Giants, Gosford Townies, Kariong Kookaburras) is a rugby league club based on the Central Coast, New South Wales region of Australia.

Known as The Storm, wearing Purple, Gold and White, it is the oldest running club and member of the Central Coast Rugby League having been originally formed in 1947.

== History ==
Gosford Storm were formed in 2000 as a result of the Gosford Giants and Kariong Kookaburras merging.

In 2010 the club entered its first seniors team who were successful in their first season although knocked out in the semi-finals by Umina.

In 2011 the club hoped to submit three teams in the seniors competition with under 17's, Open Age and a Second Grade team but was only granted inclusion for an Open Age team. The Open Age team finished the season equal 5th but failed to qualify for the semi-finals due to an 8-point difference in for & against.

2012 saw a number of new recruits join the club which the club had hoped would be enough to be accepted in fielding both a reserve grade, and open age team although this was rejected by the Central Coast Division of Rugby League with only an open age team being granted inclusion. However, only weeks out from the beginning of the season on 21 February the club was told that they along with Central Wyong Razorbacks had been excluded from entering any teams into any grades of the central coast competition, despite a number of appeals from both clubs the decision was not reversed and both clubs were forced to close their senior clubs. Both clubs still remain fully active in junior rugby league competitions.

Gosford storm will play open age 3rd grade in season 2025 - the first time since 2013 - the club is looking to return to top grade by season 2027.

== Home ground ==
Gosford Giants originally played all home games from Grahame Park which also played host for all Central Coast Rugby League finals games up until the late 1990s when the ground was redeveloped to be the new home stadium of the North Sydney Bears rugby league football club. However, as the Bears never made the move to Gosford the stadium has since become home to the Central Coast Mariners Football Club who compete in the A-League.

Following their move from Grahame Park (aka Central Coast Stadium), the team's home ground is now Carrington Street Oval, Narara.

== Season summaries ==
P=Premier, R=Runner-Up, M=Minor Premier, F=Finals Appearance, W=Wooden Spoon,
Competition	Played	Won	Drawn	Lost	Byes	Position	For	Against	P	R	M	F	W	Coach	Captain
Open Age Central Coast League season 2010	16	12	0	4	0	3/11	444	250				X		Cameron Wilson	Cameron Wilson
Open Age Central Coast League season 2011	22	9	2	7	4	=5/10	373	284						Mark Churcher	-

== Notable former players ==
- John Carlaw (1997-04 Hunter Mariners, Melbourne Storm, Warriors, Wests Tigers & St George)
- Matt Orford (2000-11 Northern Eagles, Melbourne Storm, Manly Sea Eagles & Canberra Raiders)
- Chris Finneran (Melbourne storm
- Matt Ikuvalu (2018- Sydney Roosters)
- brett Mossman (Newcastle knights)
- Ben Thompson (CCRLRA)

== Team Numbers ==
View source data.

Team numbers obtained and compiled from competition tables and match results published in the newspapers, Central Coast Express, Wyong Shire Advocate and Central Coast Express Advocate. Numbers for 2003 and 2011 taken from copies of the Central Coast Division Junior Rugby League Yearbook of those years, supplied by Toukley Hawks RLFC. Age groups Under 9 and younger not included as team numbers from 1985 to 2011 not known to the author.
