= Central Charlestown Butcher Boys =

Australian rugby league club, based in Charlestown, NSW

Club information
- Full name: Central Charlestown Butcher Boys; Rugby League; Football Club
- Founded: 1910; 115 years ago

Current details
- Ground(s): St John Oval, Charlestown (played at Passmore Oval, Wickham in 2008; Central Newcastle played at Learmonth Park, Hamilton, before merging with Charlestown)
- Competition: Newcastle Rugby League

The Central Charlestown Butcher Boys is an Australian rugby league football club based in Charlestown, New South Wales formed in 1910. They currently play in the Newcastle Rugby League competition. The team name is the amalgamation of Charlestown Junior Rugby League and Central Newcastle RLFC. The Butcherboys is a carryover from Central Newcastles origins in the Hamilton area, where local butcher shops donated meat trays that the players would raffle to generate income. Also the original playing jersey was blue and white striped similar to a butchers apron.

== Notable players ==
Newcastle born Clive Churchill was graded as a fullback with Central Newcastle in 1946. He played for Country Seconds in 1946 which brought him to the attention of talent scouts from Sydney and he eventually signed with NSWRFL team South Sydney from 1947.

Churchill, who would be dubbed "The Little Master" would amass one of the most impressive records in Australian Rugby League history.

- Rodney Howe (1992-04 Newcastle Knights, Perth Reds & Melbourne Storm)
- Tim Maddison (1993-03 Newcastle Knights, Hunter Mariners, Sydney Roosters & North Queensland Cowboys)
- Timana Tahu (1999-14 Newcastle Knights, Parramatta Eels & Penrith Panthers)
- Grant Anderson (2022- Melbourne Storm)
- Luke Walsh (2007-18 Newcastle Knights, Penrith Panthers, St Helens, Catalans Dragons.)
- Kurt Donoghoe (2024- Dolphins (NRL))
- Zac Hosking (2022- Brisbane Broncos, Penrith Panthers, Canberra Raiders)
