= Cargo, New South Wales =

Cargo
- Town
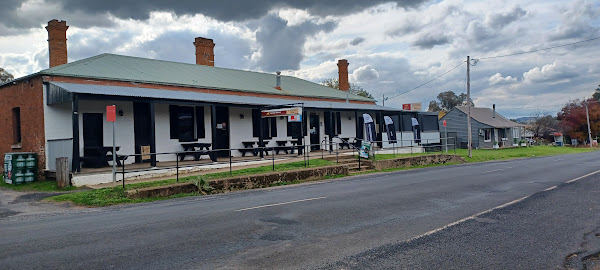
- Cargo Inn built in 1868

- Coordinates: 33°S 148°E
- Country: Australia
- State: New South Wales
- LGA: Cabonne Council

Government
  - State electorate: Orange
  - Federal division: Calare

Area
  - Total: 504 km^{2} (195 sq mi)

Population
  - Total: 596
  - Density: 1.1825/km^{2} (3.063/sq mi)

Cargo is a small town located in Cabonne Shire, New South Wales that is 35 kilometres southwest of Orange, Australia.
