= Oran Park Chargers =

Australian rugby league club, based in Oran Park, NSW

Oran Park-Gregory Hills Chargers
Club information
- Full name: Oran Park-Gregory Hills Chargers Rugby League Football Club
- Colours: Lime Green; Blue; White; Yellow
- Founded: 2014; 12 years ago

Current details
- Ground: Wayne Gardner Reserve, Oran Park
- Coach: Wayne Potts
- Competition: Group 6 Rugby League

The Oran Park-Gregory Hills Chargers Rugby League Club is a rugby league team based in Oran Park, New South Wales, Australia.

The Chargers play in the Group 6 Rugby League competition. In the 2017 season they have teams playing in the Group 6 Second Division Cup Competition, Ladies League Tag Competition as well as a junior side.

== History ==
=== 2017 ===
Oran Park had a team registered to play in both the Group 6 CRL Cup competition as well as the Group 6 CRL Shield competition. The Shield side came runners up in the Group 6 CRL Shield competition going down 36–6 to the Bundanoon Highlanders.

=== 2018 ===
Oran Park signed on major sponsor Waratah Landscape Supplies for the start of the 2018 season.

== See also ==
- Rugby league in New South Wales
