= Narellan Jets =

Australian rugby league club, based in Narellan, NSW

Club information
- Full name: Narellan Jets Rugby League Football Club
- Short name: Jets
- Colours: Blue; White
- Founded: 1977; 49 years ago

Current details
- Ground: Narellan Showground, Narellan
- Competition: Group 6 Rugby League

Records
- Premierships: 2 (1996, 2004)

Narellan Jets Rugby League Football Club is an Australian rugby league football club based in Narellan, New South Wales the club was formed in 1977.

== Notable players ==
- Ben Roberts
- Shannon Gallant
- Rocky Trimarchi
- Matt King
- Sean Keppie
- Peni Terepo
