= Goulburn Murray Rugby League =

Australian rugby league competition

Storm Goulburn Murray Premiership
- Sport: Rugby league
- Inaugural season: 1991
- Ceased: 2009
- Re-formed: 2014
- Number of teams: 6
- Premiers: Albury Muddogs (2026)
- Most titles: Corowa Cougars (7 titles)

The Goulburn Murray Premiership is a rugby league competition on the border of New South Wales and Victoria, Australia. Initially the competition was established in 1991 as the Goulburn Murray Rugby League by the Country Rugby League and the Victorian Rugby League. The league was disbanded in 2009 before being re-established as the Murray Cup in 2014. As of 2022 there is a competition for both Senior Men's and Women's Tag football. In 2023, as part of a branding arrangement, the competition is known as the Storm Goulburn Murray Premiership.

== Current clubs ==
There are currently six clubs affiliated with the Goulburn Murray Rugby League competition, with three based in New South Wales and three based in Victoria. Wodonga and Wangaratta have both succeeded former teams based in their respective cities.

Clubs	Moniker	Established	Joined	Ground	Premierships
Albury	Muddogs	2017	2017	Sarvaas Park, North Albury	1 (2026)
Border	Bears	2024	2024	Baranduda Recreation Reserve	None
Corowa	Cougars	1986	1991	Airport Oval, Corowa	5 (1999, 2001, 2004–06)
Tumbarumba	Greens	1934	2019	Tumbarumba Showground	1 (2019)
Wangaratta	Knights	2017	2017	Glenrowan Recreation Reserve	None
Wodonga	Wombats	2018	2018	Baranduda Recreation Reserve	1 (2022)

== Former Teams ==
There are more than a dozen clubs which formerly competed in the Goulburn Murray Rugby League.

Clubs	Moniker	Joined	Premierships	Fate
Albury	Roos	1992	2 (1996, 1998)	Folded 2003
Benalla	Vikings	2004	None	Folded 2008
Benalla	Wolfpack	2016	1 (2023)	Entered recess 2025
Bonegilla	Gorillas	2022	None	Folded 2022
Chiltern	Chiltern	2000s	None	Folded 2000s
Cobram-Barooga	Broncos	1994	None	Folded 1990s
Deniliquin	Raiders	1991	None	Folded 2000s
Murray River	Warriors	2015	2 (2015, 2016)	Folded 2019
Puckapunyal-Seymour	Army	1991	None	Folded 2007
Shepparton	Eagles	2024	2 (2024, 2025)	Entered recess 2026
Shepparton	Warriors	1990s	None	Folded 2008
Tocumwal/Southern Riverina	Jets	1991	4 (1993, 1994, 1997, 2002)	Folded 2005
Twin City	Hornets	2000	2 (2000, 2003)	Folded 2005
Wangaratta	Scorpions/Tigers	1991	None	Folded 2008
Westside	Brothers	2014	None	Folded 2014
Wodonga	Bears	1991	1 (1995)	Folded 2006
Wodonga	Storm	2014	3 (2014, 2017, 2018)	Folded 2022
Yarrawonga-Mulwala	Dragons	1993	None	Folded 1990s

== Goulburn Murray Rugby League/Murray Cup Champions ==
This is a list of the Goulburn Murray Rugby League 1st Grade competition champions and the runners-up for each seasons the competition existed.

Season	Premiers	Score	Runners up	Venue
Goulburn Murray Rugby League
1991	Corowa Cougars	15 – 7	Wangaratta	Sports Club Oval, Barooga
1992	Corowa Cougars	20 – 6	Southern Riverina Jets	
1993	Southern Riverina Jets	22 – 16	Corowa Cougars	
1994	Southern Riverina Jets		Corowa Cougars	
1995	Wodonga Bears		Corowa Cougars	
1996	Albury Roos		Southern Riverina Jets	
1997	Southern Riverina Jets		Corowa Cougars	
1998	Albury Roos	21 – 20	Southern Riverina Jets	
1999	Corowa Cougars	26 – 14	Southern Riverina Jets	
2000	Twin City Hornets	28 – 24	Albury Roos	
2001	Corowa Cougars	44 – 12	Twin City Hornets	
2002	Southern Riverina Jets	40 – 12	Corowa Cougars	
2003	Twin City Hornets	24 – 22	Corowa Cougars	
2004	Corowa Cougars	38 – 10	Twin City Hornets	
2005	Corowa Cougars	50 – 6	Southern Riverina Jets	
2006	Corowa Cougars	96 – 6	Benalla Vikings RLFC	
2007				
2008	Wangaratta Tigers		Wodonga	
Hiatus 2009-2013
Murray Cup
2014	Wodonga Storm	14 – 8	Corowa Cougars	
2015	Murray River Warriors	40 – 12	Wodonga Storm	
2016	Murray River Warriors	26 – 18	Corowa Cougars	Airport Oval, Corowa
2017	Wodonga Storm	14 – 4	CSU Mud Dogs	Greenfield Park, Albury
2018	Wodonga Storm	28 – 12	Murray River Warriors	Greenfield Park, Albury
2019	Tumbarumba Greens	32 – 12	Corowa Cougars	Greenfield Park, Albury
2020–2021 No Premiers; unfinished seasons due to COVID-19 pandemic
2022	Wodonga Wombats	40 – 4	Bonegilla Gorillas	Glenrowan Recreation Reserve
Goulburn Murray Premiership
2023	Wolfpack RLFC	22 – 20	Corowa Cougars	Glenrowan Recreation Reserve
2024	Shepparton Eagles	24 – 22	Tumbarumba Greens	Glenrowan Recreation Reserve
2025	Shepparton Eagles	23 – 22	Tumbarumba Greens	Glenrowan Recreation Reserve
2026	Albury Muddogs	26 – 24	Border Bears	Glenrowan Recreation Reserve

=== Ladies League Tag Premiers ===
Season	Premiers	Score	Runners up
???-2015 unknown
2016	Wodonga Storm		Murray River Warriors
2017	Wangaratta Knights		Wodonga Storm
2018	CSU Mud Dogs	28 – 0	Wodonga Storm
2019	Tumbarumba Greens	8 – 6	CSU Mud Dogs
2020–2021 No Premiers; unfinished seasons due to COVID-19 pandemic
2022	CSU Mud Dogs		
2023	Tumbarumba Greens	8 – 6	CSU Mud Dogs
2024	Wangaratta Knights	20 – 0	Corowa Cougars
2025	Shepparton Eagles	18 – 8	Corowa Cougars
2026	Wodonga Wombats	18 – 4	Tumbarumba Greens

=== Youth League Premiers ===
Season	Premiers	Score	Runners up
2017	Wangaratta Knights		Combined Murray Cup
2018	Wodonga Storm	22 – 16	Wangaratta Knights
Competition ceased
