= Smithtown, New South Wales =

Town in New South Wales, Australia

Smithtown (31°00′S 152°56′E) is a small town on the banks of the Macleay River in New South Wales, Australia. It is in Kempsey Shire. The town of Gladstone lies across on the southern side of the river. At the 2016 census, Smithtown had a population of 590 people.

The town was named after Robert Burdett Smith, a member of the New South Wales Legislative Assembly, when the post office was established in 1877.

Nestlé has an over-100-year-old factory in the town with over 200 workers, making it one of the NSW Mid-North Coast's biggest private-sector employers. Milo was first produced there in 1934 as a Depression-era nutritional supplement for children, and the factory's current production is over 13,000 tonnes per year. It is now also the only site worldwide that produces Nestlé's "Café Menu" range of products for the whole world.
