= Rugby league in Sydney =

Rugby League in Sydney
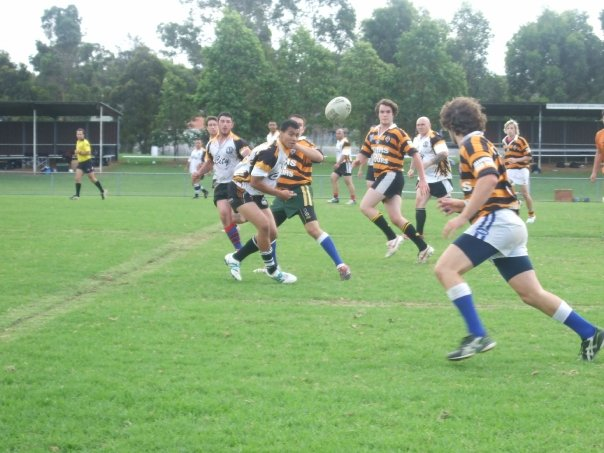
- A game in Sydney's metro competition
- Governing body: New South Wales Rugby League
- First played: 1908; 117 years ago
- Clubs: 162 (divided in 18 divisions)

Club competitions
- Ron Massey Cup; Sydney Shield; Macarthur Division Rugby League; Parramatta Junior Rugby League; Penrith District Rugby League; South Sydney District Rugby League; Metro Open Age Gold; Central Northern Open Age; Central West Open Age; Southern Open Age

Rugby league in Sydney is the city's most popular sport, with over 200 clubs in the city across levels of competition ranging from the fully professional National Rugby League to grassroots open age and junior leagues.

== History ==
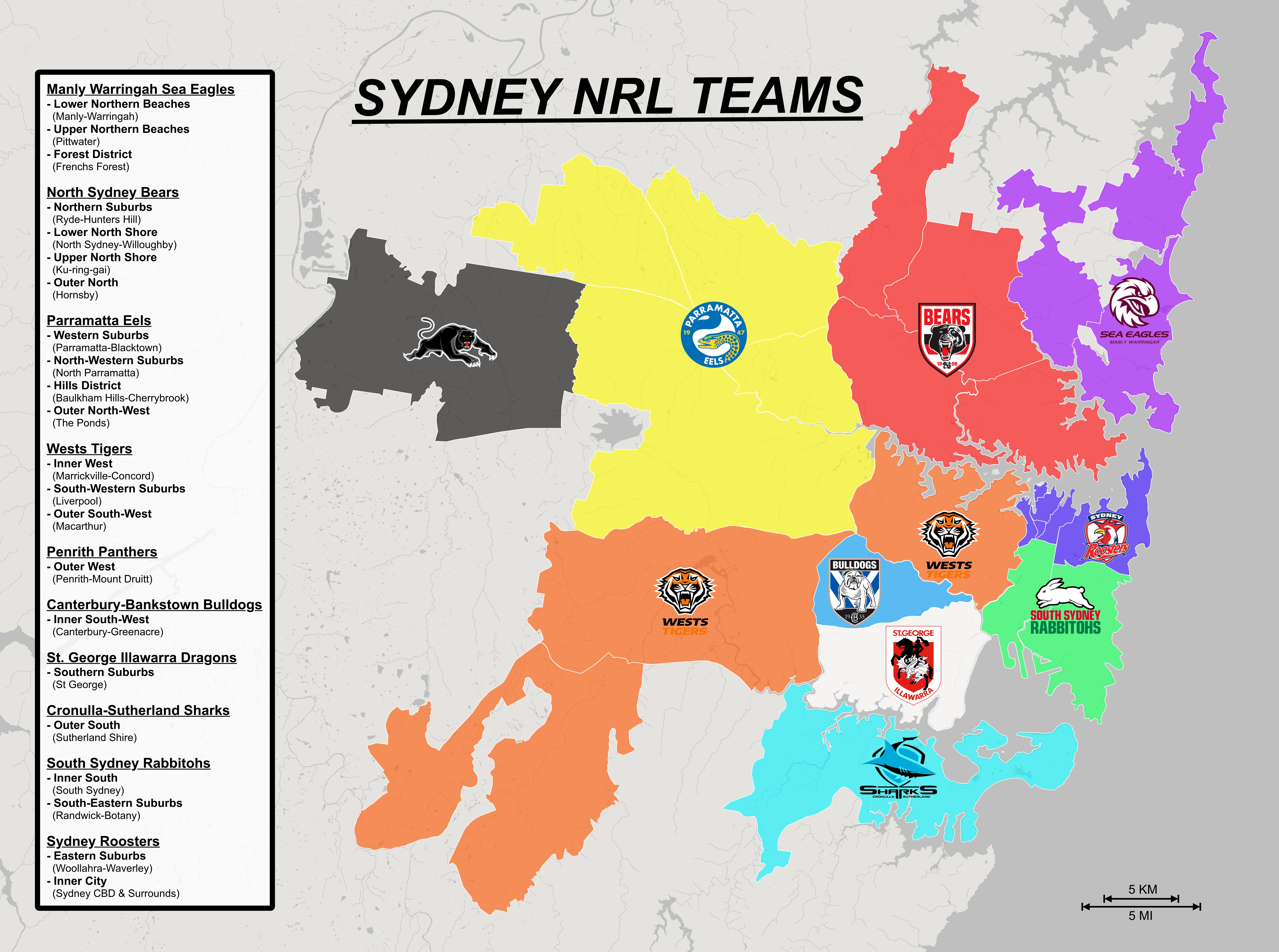
Map of Sydney's major rugby league clubs by supporters location. All compete in the country's premier competition, the National Rugby League, with the exception of North Sydney Bears who play in the second tier state competition, the New South Wales Cup.

By the 1890s Rugby football had taken hold in Sydney, thwarting attempts by Victorian rules and soccer to gain the ascendancy. The game continued to grow becoming the most popular code of football in NSW, until the issue of professionalism led to a schism in 1908 and the formation of the New South Wales Rugby Football League. The NSWRU lost many players including the great Dally Messenger to the new sport of rugby league, which became the most popular sport in Sydney by attendance and public interest by World War I.

The NSWRFL premiership was continued on the successful basis of the first competition in 1908. In 1929 Jersey Flegg was appointed to the position of president of the NSWRFL and in 1941 he became chairman of the Australian Rugby League Board of Control. At the time of his death in 1960, aged 82, he was still serving in these roles.

When NSWRFL president Flegg died in 1960, Bill Buckley replaced him and also became boss of the Australian Rugby League, a position he remained in from 1960 until his death in 1973. In 1973 Kevin Humphreys was appointed President of New South Wales Rugby League (NSWRL) and Chairman of Australian Rugby League (ARL).

In 1983 Humphreys was succeeded in these positions by Ken Arthurson. Under Arthurson the clubs in the NSWRL expanded outside the borders of the state and even the country until in 1994, after administering its 87th consecutive premiership season, the NSWRL was replaced by the Australian Rugby League as club football's peak administrative body.

Notwithstanding the hand over of control of the game at the elite level across Australia to the commission, the NSWRL did retain responsibility for both the administration of the New South Wales rugby league team in State of Origin series, as well as day-to-day management of the state-based New South Wales Cup second-tier premiership, as well as junior representative competitions.

In modern times, the NSWRL has 82,397 (450,000 including variants) participants, the vast majority of which are located in Sydney as the state's main population centre.

== Ron Massey Cup ==
The Ron Massey Cup (formerly known as the Bundaberg Red Cup and Jim Beam Cup) is a semi-professional development level rugby league competition in New South Wales currently comprising 9 teams drawn from the Sydney metropolitan area.

Colours	Club	Location	Stadium	Premierships	Founded	Joined*
	Blacktown Workers	Blacktown, New South Wales	H.E. Laybutt Fields	None	1964	2012
	Cabramatta Two Blues	Cabramatta, New South Wales	New Era Stadium	2011	1919	2004
	Canterbury-Bankstown Bulldogs	Belmore, New South Wales	Hammondville Oval	None	1937	2023
	Glebe Dirty Reds	Glebe, New South Wales	Goddard Park	2024	1908	2015
	Hills District Bulls	Baulkham Hills, New South Wales	Crestwood Oval	2022	1964	2016
	Mounties RLFC	Mount Pritchard, New South Wales	Aubrey Keech Reserve	2015-16	1927	2007
	Penrith Brothers	Penrith, New South Wales	Parker St Reserve	None	1968	2024
	Ryde-Eastwood Hawks	Ryde, New South Wales	TG Milner Field	1972, 1974-76, 1990, 2000	1962	2003
	St Marys Saints	St Marys, New South Wales	St Marys Leagues Stadium	1993-94, 2001, 2023	1908	2016
	Wentworthville Magpies	Wentworthville, New South Wales	Ringrose Park	1964-65, 1967-71, 1973, 1998-99, 2009-20, 2012-13, 2017-19	1963	2003

== Sydney Shield ==
The Sydney Shield is a rugby league football competition played in Sydney, New South Wales. The competition is administered by the New South Wales Rugby League.

Colours	Club	Location	Home Ground	Premierships	Founded	Joined
	Cabramatta Two Blues	Cabramatta, New South Wales	New Era Stadium	None	1919	2023
	Glebe Dirty Reds	Glebe, New South Wales	Wentworth Park	None	1908	2017
	Hills District Bulls	Baulkham Hills, New South Wales	Crestwood Oval	2023	1964	2012
	Manly Warringah Sea Eagles	Brookvale, New South Wales	Brookvale Oval	None	1947	2024
	Moorebank Rams	Moorebank, New South Wales	Hammondville Oval	None	1955	2017
	Mount Pritchard Mounties	Mount Pritchard, New South Wales	Aubrey Keech Reserve	None	1927	2023
	Penrith Brothers	Penrith, New South Wales	Parker St Reserve	2024	1968	2018
	Ryde-Eastwood Hawks	Ryde, New South Wales	TG Milner Field	2019	1962	2019
	St Marys Saints	St Marys, New South Wales	St Marys Leagues Stadium	2017, 2022	1908	2016 (Note: Played in one Sydney Shield match in 2020, prior to the suspension of the competition due to the Covid-19 pandemic in Australia. Did not enter a team when the competition recommenced in July 2020.)
	Wentworthville United	Wentworthville, New South Wales	Ringrose Park	2012, 2015	1963	2012

== Macarthur Conference ==
=== First Grade and Reserve Grade ===
Club	Moniker	Home Ground	Premierships	Premiership Years
Camden	Rams	Kirkham Park, Elderslie	10	1948, 1951, 1978, 1994, 1997–98, 2000, 2002, 2016, 2022
Campbelltown City	Kangaroos	Fullwood Reserve, Claymore	11	1946, 1949, 1969–71, 1973–75, 1980, 1983, 2017
Campbelltown Collegians JRLFC	Collies	Campbelltown Stadium	0	None
East Campbelltown	Eagles	Waminda Oval, Campbelltown	1	2012
Mittagong	Lions	Mittagong Sports Ground, Mittagong	10	1937, 1945, 1959, 1962–64, 1967, 1988, 1991, 1995
Oakdale Workers	Bears	Sid Sharpe Memorial Oval, Oakdale	2	1993, 2011
Narellan Jets	Jets	Narellan Sports Ground, Narellan	2	1996, 2004
Picton	Magpies	Victoria Park, Picton	13	1935, 1966, 1981, 1985–87, 1999, 2005, 2009, 2013–15, 2018
The Oaks	Tigers	Dudley Chesham Sports Ground, The Oaks	3	1976, 1977, 1992
South West	Goannas	Narellan Sports Ground, Narellan	0	None
Thirlmere-Tahmoor	Roosters	Thirlmere Sports Ground, Thirlmere	6	2001, 2003, 2006, 2008, 2019, 2020

=== Third Grade ===
Club	Moniker	Home Ground
Campbelltown City	Kangaroos	Fullwood Reserve, Claymore
Campbelltown City (2)	Wallabies	Fullwood Reserve, Claymore
East Campbelltown	Eagles	Waminda Oval, Campbelltown
Mittagong	Lions	Mittagong Sports Ground, Mittagong
Picton	Magpies	Victoria Park, Picton
The Oaks	Tigers	Dudley Chesham Sports Ground, The Oaks
Warragamba	Wombats	Warragamba Sportsground

=== Open Age ===
Club	Moniker	Home Ground
Appin	Dogs	Appin Park
Eaglevale St Andrews	Magpies	Benham Reserve
Glenquarie	All Stars	Bradbury Oval
Liverpool Catholic Club	Raiders	Liverpool Catholic Club Sporting Complex
Minto	Cobras	Benham Reserve
Mt Annan	Knights	Jack Nash Oval
Oran Park-Gregory Hills	Chargers	Wayne Gardner Reserve, Oran Park
Warragamba	Wombats	Warragamba Sportsground

== NSWRL Conference competitions ==
The NSWRL Conference Competitions are a set of competitions for clubs in the Sydney rugby league districts of Balmain, Canterbury-Bankstown, Cronulla-Sutherland, Manly-Warringah/North Sydney, Parramatta and St. George.

=== Metro Open Age Gold ===
The competition is holding one top grade division in 2023, similar to the now defunct Sydney Combined Competition.

Club	Moniker	Home Ground	Suburb	District
Avalon	Bulldogs	Hitchcock Park	Avalon Beach, New South Wales	Manly-Warringah/North Sydney
Belrose Eagles	Eagles	Lionel Watts Oval	Belrose, New South Wales	Manly-Warringah/North Sydney
Berowra	Wallabies	Warrina Oval	Berowra, New South Wales	Manly-Warringah/North Sydney
Cromer	Kingfishers	St Matthews Farm	Cromer, New South Wales	Manly-Warringah/North Sydney
East Hills	Bulldogs	East Hills	Castle Hill, New South Wales	Canterbury-Bankstown
Forrestville	Ferrets	Forestville Park	Forestville, New South Wales	Manly-Warringah/North Sydney
Harbord United	Devils	Harbord Park	Harbord, New South Wales	Manly-Warringah/North Sydney
Hills District	Bulls	Crestwood Oval	Baulkham Hills, New South Wales	Parramatta Junior Rugby League
Moorebank	Rams	Hammondville Oval	Moorebank, New South Wales	Canterbury-Bankstown
Narrabeen	Sharks	Lake Park	Narrabeen, New South Wales	Manly-Warringah/North Sydney
Ryde-Eastwood	Hawks	Lidcombe Oval	Ryde, New South Wales	Balmain District Junior Rugby League
Wentworthville United JRLFC	Magpies	Ringrose Park	Wentworthville, New South Wales	Parramatta Junior Rugby League

=== Central Northern Open Age ===
The Central Northern Open Age competitions are for clubs in the Sydney rugby league districts of Balmain and Manly-Warringah/North Sydney. The following clubs are participating in Central Northern District competitions in 2023. This competition's Gold division is merged with Central West for 2023 as Metro Open Age Gold (see above).

==== Central Northern Open Age Silver ====
Club	Moniker	Home Ground	Suburb	District
Asquith	Magpies	Storey Park	Asquith, New South Wales	Manly-Warringah/North Sydney
Bondi United	United	Bondi	Bondi, New South Wales	South Sydney District RFL
Concord-Burwood	Wolves	Wentworth Park	Concord, New South Wales	Balmain District Junior Rugby League
Cromer (2)	Kingfishers	St Matthews Farm	Cromer, New South Wales	Manly-Warringah/North Sydney
Leichhardt	Tigers	Birchgrove Oval	Leichhardt, New South Wales	Balmain District Junior Rugby League
Leichhardt	Wanderers	N/A	Sydney	Balmain District Junior Rugby League
Sydney University	Lions	University Oval	University of Sydney	Balmain District Junior Rugby League
TAFE NSW	Polecats	N/A	Sydney	Balmain District Junior Rugby League
Willoughby	Roos	Willoughby Park	Willoughby, New South Wales	Manly-Warringah/North Sydney

==== Central Northern Open Age Bronze ====
Club	Moniker	Home Ground	Suburb	District
Asquith (2)	Magpies	Storey Park	Asquith, New South Wales	Manly-Warringah/North Sydney
Carlingford Cougars	Cougars	N/A	Carlingford, New South Wales	Balmain District Junior Rugby League
Harbord United	Devils	Harbord Park	Harbord, New South Wales	Manly-Warringah/North Sydney
Leichhardt (2)	Wanderers	N/A	Sydney	Balmain District Junior Rugby League
Macquarie University	Warriors	Macquarie University	Ryde, New South Wales	Manly-Warringah/North Sydney
Pennant Hills-Cherrybrook	Stags	Greenway Park	Pennant Hills, New South Wales	Manly-Warringah/North Sydney
Redfern All Blacks	All Blacks	Pioneers Park	Redfern, New South Wales	South Sydney District RFL
Sydney University (2)	Lions	University Oval	University of Sydney	Balmain District Junior Rugby League
TAFE NSW (2)	Polecats	N/A	Sydney	Balmain District Junior Rugby League

=== Central West Open Age ===
Central West Open Age is the premier rugby league competition clubs in the Parramatta and Canterbury-Bankstown districts of Sydney. The competition features 12 clubs in 2023, in a single division, with its gold clubs playing in the Metro Gold competition.

==== Central West Open Age Silver ====
Club	Moniker	Home Ground	Suburb	District
All-Saints Toongabbie	Tigers	C.V. Kelly Park	Toongabbie, New South Wales	Parramatta Junior Rugby League
Bankstown Sports	Club	Bankstown Sports Club	Bankstown, New South Wales	Canterbury-Bankstown
Berala	Bears	N/A	Berala, New South Wales	Canterbury-Bankstown
Canley Vale	Kookaburras	Adams Park	Canley Vale, New South Wales	Parramatta Junior Rugby League
Chester Hill	Hornets	N/A	Chester Hill, New South Wales	Canterbury-Bankstown
Greenacre	Tigers	N/A	Greenacre, New South Wales	Canterbury-Bankstown
Guildford	Owls	Mccredie Park	Guildford, New South Wales	Parramatta Junior Rugby League
Kellyville	Bushrangers	Kellyville Park	Kellyville, New South Wales	Parramatta Junior Rugby League
Lalor Park	Kookas	Cavanagh Reserve	Lalor Park, New South Wales	Parramatta Junior Rugby League
Merrylands	Rams	Merrylands Oval	Merrylands, New South Wales	Parramatta Junior Rugby League
South West	Sharks	N/A	Sydney	Parramatta Junior Rugby League

== Parramatta JRL Open Age ==
=== Clubs ===
Club	Moniker	Suburb
Austral City	Bears	Austral, New South Wales
Baulkham Hills	Brumbies	Baulkham Hills, New South Wales
Hurricanes	Hurricanes	Sydney
OLQP	Bulldogs	Sydney
South West	Sharks	Sydney
Winston Hills (1)	Hawks	Winston Hills, New South Wales
Winston Hills (2)	Hawks	Winston Hills, New South Wales

== Penrith District Rugby League ==
=== Division 1 ===
Club	Moniker	Suburb
Colyton	Colts	Colyton, New South Wales
Cambridge Park	Panthers	Cambridge Park, New South Wales
Emu Plains	Emus	Emu Plains, New South Wales
Glenmore Park	Broncos	Glenmore Park, New South Wales
Minchinbury Jets	Magpies	Minchinbury, New South Wales
North West	Magpies	Richmond, New South Wales
Penrith Brothers	Brothers	Penrith, New South Wales
St Clair	Comets	St Clair, New South Wales
St Mary's Saints	Saints	St Marys, New South Wales
St Patricks	Saints	The Ponds, New South Wales
Windsor	Wolves	Windsor, New South Wales

=== Division 2 ===
Club	Moniker	Suburb
Doonside	Roos	Doonside, New South Wales
Hawkesbury	Hawks	Hawkesbury, New South Wales
Lower Mountains	Mounties	Penrith, New South Wales
Riverstone	Razorbacks	Riverstone, New South Wales
Quakers Hill	Quakers	Quakers Hill, New South Wales
Western City	Tigers	Penrith, New South Wales

=== Division 3 ===
Club	Moniker	Suburb
Colyton	Colts	Colyton, New South Wales
Cambridge Park	Panthers	Cambridge Park, New South Wales
Doonside	Roos	Doonside, New South Wales
Emu Plains	Emus	Emu Plains, New South Wales
St Clair	Comets	St Clair, New South Wales
St Patricks	Saints	The Ponds, New South Wales
Windsor	Wolves	Windsor, New South Wales

== Southern Open Age ==
Southern Open Age is the premier rugby league competition clubs in the Cronulla-Sutherland and St. George districts of Sydney. The competition features 12 clubs in 2023, across two divisions, Gold (First Grade) and Silver (Second Grade).

=== Southern Open Age Gold ===
Club	Moniker	Home Ground	Suburb
Como-Jannali	Crocodiles	Scylla Bay Oval	Como, New South Wales
De La Salle Caringbah	Saints	Captain Cook Oval	Caringbah, New South Wales
Engadine	Dragons	ANZAC Oval	Engadine, New South Wales
Gymea	Gorillas	Corea Oval	Gymea, New South Wales
Kogarah	Cougars	Todd Park	Kogarah, New South Wales
St John Bosco	Bulldogs	Boystown Oval	Sutherland, New South Wales
St Joseph's	Kangaroos	Kareela Oval	Sutherland, New South Wales

=== Southern Open Age Silver A ===
Club	Moniker	Home Ground	Suburb
Como-Jannali	Crocodiles	Scylla Bay Oval	Como, New South Wales
De La Salle Caringbah	Saints	Captain Cook Oval	Caringbah, New South Wales
Gymea	Gorillas	Corea Oval	Gymea, New South Wales
Renown United	United	Renown Park	Sydney, New South Wales
St John Bosco	Bulldogs	Boystown Oval	Sutherland, New South Wales
St Joseph's	Kangaroos	Kareela Oval	Sutherland, New South Wales
Taren Point	Titans	Gwawley Oval	Taren Point, New South Wales

=== Southern Open Age Silver B ===
Club	Moniker	Home Ground	Suburb
Aquinas	Colts	Blaxland Oval	Sutherland, New South Wales
Cronulla-Caringbah	Sharks	Cronulla High School	Cronulla, New South Wales
Engadine	Dragons	ANZAC Oval	Engadine, New South Wales
Kingsgrove	Colts	Beverley Hills Park	Kingsgrove, New South Wales
Riverwood Legion Club	Riverwood	Riverwood Park	Sutherland, New South Wales

== South Sydney District Rugby League ==
=== A Grade ===
Club	Moniker	Suburb
Coogee	Dolphins	Coogee, New South Wales
La Perouse United	Panthers	La Perouse, New South Wales
Mascot Juniors	Jets	Mascot, New South Wales
Matraville	Tigers	Matraville, New South Wales
Redfern All Blacks	All Blacks	Redfern, New South Wales
South Eastern	Seagulls	Malabar, New South Wales

=== A Reserve ===
Club	Moniker	Suburb
Alexandria Rovers	Rovers	Alexandria, New South Wales
Coogee	Dolphins	Coogee, New South Wales
La Perouse United	Panthers	La Perouse, New South Wales
Mascot Juniors	Jets	Mascot, New South Wales
Marrickville RSL	Kings	Marrickville, New South Wales
Matraville	Tigers	Matraville, New South Wales
Moore Park	Broncos	Moore Park, New South Wales
Redfern All Blacks	All Blacks	Redfern, New South Wales
South Eastern	Seagulls	Malabar, New South Wales

== Junior Comepetitions ==
There are currently ten junior rugby league competitions in Sydney. These are:

- Balmain District Junior Rugby League
- Canterbury-Bankstown JRL
- Cronulla-Sutherland District JRL
- Manly-Warringah/North Sydney District JRL
- Parramatta Junior Rugby League
- Penrith District Junior Rugby League
- South Sydney District Junior Rugby Football League
- St. George JRL
- Sydney Roosters Juniors
- Wests Tigers Macarthur DJRL

== See also ==
- Penrith District Rugby League
- South Sydney District Junior Rugby Football League
- Sydney Combined Competition
- Brisbane Second Division Rugby League
