= Rugby league in New South Wales =

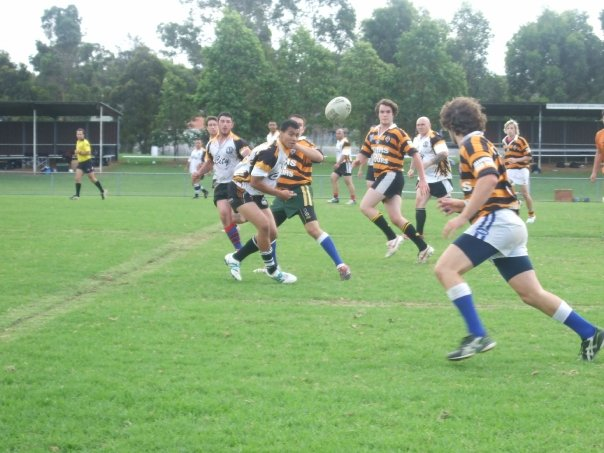
- NSW Tertiary student rugby league
- Governing body: New South Wales Rugby League
- Representative team: New South Wales
- Nicknames: League, Football, Footy, Greatest Game of All
- First played: 1907 in Sydney
- Registered players: 83,474; 450,000 (including variants)

Club competitions
- NSW Cup; Ron Massey Cup; Sydney Shield; Central Northern Open Age; Central West Open Age; Penrith Open Men's; Southern Open Age; South Sydney A-Grade; Barwon Darling Rugby League; Canberra Rugby League; Castlereagh Rugby League; Central Coast Division; George Tooke Shield; Hastings League; Illawarra Rugby League; Macarthur Division Rugby League; Mid West Cup; Murray Cup; Newcastle Rugby League; Newcastle & Hunter Rugby League; Northern Rivers Regional Rugby League; Outback Rugby League; Sunraysia-Riverlands Rugby League; Western Riverina Community Cup; Woodbridge Cup; Group 2 Rugby League; Group 3 Rugby League; Group 4 Rugby League; Group 7 Rugby League; Group 9 Rugby League; Group 10 Rugby League; Group 11 Rugby League; Group 16 Rugby League; Group 19 Rugby League; Group 20 Rugby League; Group 21 Rugby League

Audience records
- Single match: 107,999 (1999) St George Illawarra Dragons vs Melbourne Storm 1999 NRL Grand Final (Stadium Australia, Sydney)

Rugby league in New South Wales is the most popular spectator sport in the state, with the attendance and television audiences exceeding that of the various other codes of football. There are over 400,000 active rugby league participants, with a further 1 million playing the sport in schools, placing the sport second only to soccer for the most played sport in the state. There are more than 500 active clubs, ten of which are professional teams competing in the National Rugby League (NRL).

The code in Australia began in Sydney in 1907 when the New South Wales Rugby League was formed as a professional competition, following the rules of the Northern Rugby Football Union in England. New South Wales remains the headquarters in Australia, with the Australian Rugby League based in Sydney. Sydney hosts the annual NRL Grand Final and has hosted the Rugby League World Cup twice.

Rugby league, along with touch football variant is played in most secondary schools throughout the state as well as at junior and club levels.

The premier state-level league is the New South Wales Cup, involving reserve teams for New South Wales sides in the NRL.

The New South Wales rugby league team plays against the Queensland rugby league team annually in the State of Origin series. Origin legends include: James Tedesco, Jarryd Hayne, Andrew Ettingshausen, Eric Grothe, Laurie Daley, Brad Fittler, Andrew Johns, Phil Gould, Bradley Clyde, Paul Sironen, Ben Kennedy, Glenn Lazarus, Paul Harrogan, Danny Buderus, Steve Roach, Boyd Cordner, Michael O'Connor and Brett Kenny. Clive Churchill, Bob Fulton, John Raper, Reg Gasnier, Graeme Langlands, Dally Messenger, Frank Burge and Dave Brown have been bestowed the title rugby league "Immortals".

== History ==
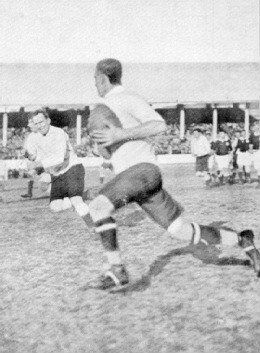
RL Pioneers Dan Frawley(r), Dally Messenger(l) in action for NSW 1912.

Conducting its inaugural meeting in 1865, the now-defunct Sydney Football Club holds the honour of being Australia's first rugby club. The inaugural Sydney club competition was in 1874, competed by the Balmain Rugby Union Football Club, Newington College, Uni, and The King's School.

Arguments over the differences in the playing rules followed by each club or school led to the formation of the Southern Rugby Football Union (later renamed the New South Wales Rugby Union).

By the 1890s Rugby football had taken hold in New South Wales, thwarting attempts by Victorian rules and soccer to gain the ascendancy. The game continued to grow becoming the most popular code of football in NSW, until the issue of professionalism led to a schism in 1908 and the formation of the New South Wales Rugby Football League. The NSWRU lost many players including the great Dally Messenger to the new sport of rugby league, which became the most popular sport in the state by attendance and public interest by World War I.

== Governing body ==
The New South Wales Rugby League (NSWRL) is the governing body for rugby league in New South Wales and is a member of the Australian Rugby League.

The New South Wales Country Rugby League (NSWCRL) is the governing body for rugby league in areas of New South Wales outside the Sydney metropolitan area and for the Australian Capital Territory.

== Participation ==
Registered players
2022/23	2023/24
82,397	83,474

== National Rugby League ==
The National Rugby League (NRL) is Australia's top-level competition for the sport of rugby league.

The headquarters of the National Rugby League (NRL) is in Sydney. Greater Sydney is home to 9 of the 17 National Rugby League teams: the Canterbury-Bankstown Bulldogs, Cronulla-Sutherland Sharks, Manly Warringah Sea Eagles, Parramatta Eels, Penrith Panthers, South Sydney Rabbitohs, Sydney Roosters, and Wests Tigers, as well as being the northern home of the St. George Illawarra Dragons, which is half-based in Wollongong. A tenth New South Welsh team, the Newcastle Knights, is based in Newcastle.

Each team has 12 home games, with all of the fully Sydney-based clubs playing one game regionally. These games move venues every few seasons and are thus not included in the table below as they are non-permanent venues.

Club	Location	Home Ground(s)	First season
Canterbury-Bankstown Bulldogs	Sydney (Canterbury)	Belmore Sports Ground (2 games) (19,000); Stadium Australia (8 games) (83,500)	1935
Cronulla-Sutherland Sharks	Sydney (Cronulla)	Shark Park/PointsBet Stadium (11 games) (22,500)	1967
Manly Warringah Sea Eagles	Sydney (Manly)	Brookvale Oval (11 games) (23,000)	1947
Newcastle Knights	Newcastle	Newcastle International Sports Centre (12 games) (33,000)	1988
Parramatta Eels	Sydney (Parramatta)	Western Sydney Stadium (11 games) (20,000) Marrara Oval (1 game) (14,000)	1947
Penrith Panthers	Sydney (Penrith)	Penrith Stadium (11 games) (22,000)	1967
South Sydney Rabbitohs	Sydney	Stadium Australia (9 games) (83,500); Sydney Football Stadium (1 game) (42,500)	1908
St. George Illawarra Dragons	Sydney; Wollongong	Jubilee Oval (6 games) (20,500); Wollongong Showground (6 games) (22,000)	1999
Sydney Roosters	Sydney	Sydney Football Stadium (11 games) (42,500); Central Coast Stadium (1 game) (20,000)	1908
Wests Tigers	Sydney (Campbelltown) (Balmain)	Campbelltown Stadium (4 games) (20,000); Leichhardt Oval (4 games) (20,000); Western Sydney Stadium (4 games) (30,000)	2000

== Major Competitions ==
For information about the New South Rugby League Premierships run from the inception of rugby league in Australia until the ARL Premierships, see New South Wales Rugby League premiership.

The NSWRL currently administers the following major competitions throughout NSW.

=== New South Wales Cup ===
The Knock-on Effect NSW Cup is the state's premier men's open-age competition, directly feeding into the NRL.

=== Sydney Metropolitan Women's Rugby League ===
The Sydney Metropolitan Women's Rugby League is a Women's rugby league football competition played in Sydney held by New South Wales Women's Rugby League

=== Ron Massey Cup ===
The Ron Massey Cup is a semi-professional Rugby League competition – the second-tier competition for NSWRL Seniors – with clubs and players feeding into the Knock-on Effect NSW Cup.

=== Sydney Shield ===
The Sydney Shield is the NSWRL's fourth-tier men's competition, feeding into the Ron Massey Cup for both emerging and senior players.

=== Tertiary Student Rugby League ===
The NSW Tertiary Student Rugby League is an affiliated body of the New South Wales Rugby League, established to promote the development of Rugby League within Universities, TAFE and other Tertiary Institutes within the state of NSW.

=== Jersey Flegg Cup ===
The Jersey Flegg Cup is a senior rugby league competition played in New South Wales, played between teams made up of players aged under 20.

=== S.G. Ball Cup ===
The S. G. Ball Cup is a junior rugby league football competition played in New South Wales, played between teams made up of players aged under 18.

=== GIO Schoolboy Cup ===
The GIO Schoolboy Cup is the premier secondary schools rugby league competition in Australia.

=== Tarsha Gale Cup ===
The Tarsha Gale Cup is a women's junior rugby league competition played in New South Wales, between teams made up of players aged under 18.

=== Harold Matthews Cup ===
The Harold Matthews Cup is a junior rugby league competition played in New South Wales, between teams made up of players aged under 16.

== Senior Competitions ==
=== Statewide/Representative ===
==== Open age ====
- Canterbury Cup NSW
- NSW Women's Premiership
- Presidents Cup
- NSW Challenge Cup
- Men's Country Championships
- Women's Country Championships

==== Age-based ====
- Jersey Flegg Cup (U20s)
- S.G. Ball Cup (U18s)
- Laurie Daley Cup (U18s)
- Tarsha Gale Cup (Women's U18s)
- Harold Matthews Cup (U16s)
- Andrew Johns Cup (U16s)

=== Metropolitan ===
==== NSWRL Premier Competitions ====
- Ron Massey Cup
- Sydney Shield

==== NSWRL Conference Competitions ====
- Macarthur Division Rugby League
- NSWRL Conference Competitions
  - Metro Open Age Gold (Manly/Norths/Balmain/Canterbury/Parramatta)
  - Central Northern Open Age (Manly/Norths/Balmain)
  - Central West Open Age (Canterbury/Parramatta)
  - Southern Open Age (Cronulla/St George)
- Penrith District Rugby League
- South Sydney A Grade

==== Region - Macarthur Wests Tigers ====
- Macarthur Division Rugby League (formerly Country, Group 6)*

==== Junior Only ====
- Balmain JRL
- Canterbury JRL
- Cronulla-Sutherland JRL
- Manly-Warringah/North Sydney JRL
- Parramatta JRL
- Penrith JRL
- St George JRL
- South Sydney JRL
- Sydney Roosters JRL

=== Country ===
==== Region 1 – East Coast Dolphins/Northern Rivers Titans ====
- Northern Rivers Division (Group 1 and 18's Merger)*
- Group 2 (Northern Mid North Coast)*
- Group 3 (Southern Mid North Coast)*
- Hastings League (Mid North Coast Second Tier)

==== Region 2 – Greater Northern Tigers ====
- Group 4 (Western New England)*
- Group 19 (New England)*
- Group 21 (Hunter)*

==== Region 3 – Bidgee Bulls (Riverina & Monaro) ====
- Canberra Division (Formerly Group 8)*
- Group 9 (Wagga Wagga and Districts)*
- Group 16 (Far South Coast)*
- Group 17 (Western Riverina Community Cup)
- Group 20 (Griffith and Districts)*
- George Tooke Shield (Canberra Division 2)

==== Region 4 – Western Rams ====
- Peter McDonald Premiership (Groups 10 & 11 First Grade)*
  - Group 10 (Central West)
  - Group 11 (Dubbo and Districts)
- Group 12 (Outback RL)
- Group 14 (Castlereagh Cup)
- Group 15 (Barwon Darling RL)
- Woodbridge Cup (Central West Division 2)
- Mid West Cup (Central West Division 3)

==== Region 5 – Greater Southern (Illawarra-South Coast Dragons) ====
- Illawarra Division*
- Group 7 (South Coast & Southern Highlands)*

==== Region 6 – Newcastle & Central Coast ====
- Central Coast Division*
- Newcastle Division*
- Newcastle & Hunter Rugby League

* = Top-level Country leagues; Premiers eligible for Clayton Cup as best regional team in the state.

=== NRL Victoria Competitions Involving NSW Teams ===
- Murray Cup
- Sunraysia-Riverlands Rugby League

== Former competitions ==
=== Royal Agricultural Society Shield ===
The Royal Agricultural Society Shield, or RAS Shield was the New South Wales Rugby League (NSWRL)'s first premiership trophy. It was presented to each year's premiership winning rugby league team; the first to win three successive titles would take permanent ownership of the shield. The Eastern Suburbs club achieved this feat winning premierships in 1911, 1912 and 1913.

The hand crafted silver and oak designed shield was donated to the NSWRL by the Royal Agricultural Society of New South Wales in its first year of competition.

Leading journalist Claude Corbett wrote in Sydney, Sun, newspaper on, 1 May 1914, "The Royal Agricultural Society Shield, which was presented at the inception of the League's first grade competition has been won outright by Eastern Suburbs, who upset all calculations by winning the premiership three years in succession. The club has presented the shield to their captain, Dally Messenger, 'as a token of appreciation of his captaincy."

In 1929 Jersey Flegg was appointed to the position of president of the NSWRFL.

=== J.J. Giltinan Shield ===
In 1951, the NSWRFL originated the J.J. Giltinan Shield, following his death in 1950. This trophy was awarded to the premiers of the NSWRFL competition, being named after one of the founding fathers of the NSWRFL and rugby league in Australia. The trophy remains today, being awarded to the minor premiers of the National Rugby League competition.

Following Jersey Flegg's death in 1960, Bill Buckley was made the NSWRFL's new president.

The NSWRFL had also commenced a very popular and successful mid-week competition in 1974, originally known as the Amco Cup, but later as the Tooth Cup and the National Panasonic Cup. The success of this competition, which included teams from both Brisbane and New Zealand, ultimately created pressure for further expansion in the NSWRFL competition.

In 1980, the NSWRFL President Kevin Humphries, was instrumental in the establishment of the State of Origin series between teams representing the NSWRFL and Queensland Rugby League (QRL). The immediate success of this series, which remains the premier representative competition in Australia, and the overriding success of the Queensland team further pressured the NSWRFL to expand the club competition outside the boundaries of the state.

Sydney suburban teams came and went throughout the NSWRFL's history but it was not until 1982 that the competition included expansion outside of the Sydney area. This corresponded with the adoption of commercial sponsorship of the competition for the first time, the Winfield Cup. The two new inclusions were from the Australian Capital Territory – the Canberra Raiders – as well as a team from the southern New South Wales region – the Illawarra Steelers.

=== Winfield Cup ===
The magnificent Winfield Cup trophy remains a permanent symbol of one of the game's most successful eras. Cast in bronze by Alan Ingham, it was the game's ultimate prize for the duration of the Winfield sponsorship from 1982 to 1995.

John O’Gready's world famous photograph of Norm Provan (St George) and Arthur Summons (Wests) after the 1963 Grand Final, the trophy represented the premiership pinnacle for players in the Winfield Era. The image of Norm Provan and Arthur Summons encompasses many of the finer things about Rugby League – the sportsmanship after battle, the satisfaction of the shared experience on the playing field – no matter how hard and tough the struggle has been, the message that Rugby League, for all its professionalism, is still a game.

The Winfield Cup captured these and many other enduring things about league in its primary image, "The Gladiators" and the famous trophy, like the JJ Giltinan Shield, remains an important part of the game's heritage.

The League's name was changed in 1984 to the New South Wales Rugby League and Ken Arthurson became the new chairman. In 1988, two Queensland teams joined the competition, with the inclusions of the Brisbane Broncos and the Gold Coast-Tweed Giants seeing the game move beyond the outer borders of New South Wales. At the same time a team from the Hunter region of New South Wales was included, with the return of a Newcastle franchise. Their return was the end of a 79-year wait in the wilderness and this time around the franchise was badged the Newcastle Knights.

The Winfield Cup competition was handed over to the control of the Australian Rugby League for the 1995 season, with the inclusion of teams from North Queensland, Western Australia and New Zealand. This period of expansion created tremendous success for the competition and rugby league in general. Over 3 million fans attended competition matches in the 1995 season and this figure remains the record for a single season attendance until this day.

== Representative ==
NSWRL manages the New South Wales State of Origin team as well the NSW Residents, Jim Beam Cup, under-19s, under-17s and under-16s and Indigenous rugby league teams. These teams traditionally play against teams from the Queensland Rugby League.

City vs Country is an annual match that takes place between a City side selected by the NSWRL and a Country side selected by New South Wales Country Rugby League. It is played before the Rugby League State of Origin series and is often referred to as a selection trial for the New South Wales Blues team.

The annual State of Origin series between the New South Wales Blues and the Queensland Maroons is the most popular sporting event in NSW. Sydney has hosted many State of Origin matches since the series began in 1980. The three-game series are held in Sydney and Brisbane with the first and third games in one city and the second in the other. These rotate every year, so if two games are played in Sydney one year, then those games are played in Brisbane the next.

== See also ==
- Rugby league in Australia
- Sport in New South Wales
