= Hills District Bulls =

Australian rugby league club, based in Baulkham Hills, NSW

Club information
- Full name: Hills District Junior Rugby League Football Club
- Nickname(s): The Bulls, Hills.
- Colours: Black; Maroon; Yellow
- Founded: 1964; 62 years ago

Current details
- Ground: Crestwood Oval
- Coach: Paul Griffin
- Competition: Parramatta Junior Rugby League; Ron Massey Cup; Sydney Shield

The Hills District Bulls is an Australian rugby league football club. It plays in the Parramatta District junior league based in Baulkham Hills at Crestwood Oval.

They have played in the Parramatta District since 1964. They field teams in all age groups including C-Grade, A-Grade, Sydney Shield and Ron Massey Cup competitions.

== History ==
The club's inaugural season was 1964. They commenced with an A Grade, A Reserve Grade and C Grade team and trained on Yattenden Oval. On some match days when there were insufficient A Grade players available, players from the A Reserve Grade team would double up and play two games. They moved from Yattenden Oval to The Castle Hill Showground in about 1966 although some home games were played at the Showground in 1964. From there they moved to Jasper Road to train and play their home games. The C Grade side won the Premiership in 1965 their second year in the competition and the first Premiership for the Club. They have used Crestwood Oval, Baulkham Hills, as their home ground since it was created in the 1970s. On 4 September 2022, Hills District won the Ron Massey Cup after defeating Glebe 18-12 in the grand final. On 3 September 2023, Hill District defeated St Mary's 34-30 to win the Sydney Shield Grand Final.

Hills District are currently a senior feeder side to NSW Cup team The North Sydney Bears.

== Notable Juniors ==
Notable First Grade Players that have played at Hills District Bulls include:

- John Kolc (1972–81 Parramatta Eels)
- Wade L'Estrange (2000 Parramatta Eels)
- Daniel Irvine (2000–07 Parramatta Eels, Canterbury & South Sydney Rabbitohs)
- Nathan McMillan (2003 Parramatta Eels)
- Heath L'Estrange (2004–13 Manly-Warringah Sea Eagles, Sydney & Bradford)
- John Williams (2005–10 Parramatta Eels, Sydney, Cronulla & North Queensland)
- Blake Green (2007– Parramatta Eels, Cronulla, Canterbury, Hull KR & Wigan)
- David Williams (2008–15 Manly-Warringah Sea Eagles)
- Jarred Farlow (2013 Wests Tigers)
- Jason Baitieri (2010– Sydney Roosters & Catalans Dragons)
- Jamie Buhrer (2010– Manly-Warringah Sea Eagles, Newcastle Knights)
- Luke Keary (2013– South Sydney Rabbitohs, Sydney Roosters)
- Ava Seumanufagai (2013– West Tigers, Cronulla-Sutherland Sharks, Leeds)
- Pauli Pauli (2014– Parramatta Eels, Newcastle Knights, Wakefield Trinity)
- Feleti Mateo (2004, 2006–2010 Parramatta Eels, 2011–2014 New Zealand Warriors, (2015–2016) Manly-Warringah Sea Eagles)
- Joshua Curran (2019 Sydney Roosters, New Zealand Warriors)
- Ryan Papenhuyzen (2019– Melbourne Storm)
- Luke Sommerton (2023- Penrith Panthers)
- Jayden Tanner (2023 Canterbury-Bankstown Bulldogs)
- Ethan Sanders (2024- Parramatta Eels & Canberra Raiders)

== Patrons ==
The club patrons are John Kolc and Ron Hilditch, both of whom played first grade for Parramatta Eels and represented Australia.

== Playing Record in NSWRL Competitions ==
=== Ron Massey Cup ===
Year	Competition	Ladder			Finals Position	All Match Record						
Year	Competition	Pos	Byes	Pts	Finals Position	P	W	L	D	For	Agst	Diff
2016	Ron Massey Cup	8	2	22	Last 6 Semi-Finalist	22	10	12	0	686	512	174
2017	Ron Massey Cup	3	7	36	Last 6 Semi-Finalist	20	11	9	0	513	436	77
2018	Ron Massey Cup	9	2	12		18	4	14	0	254	562	-308
2019	Ron Massey Cup	8	2	16	Last 4 Preliminary Finalist	23	9	14	0	500	548	-48
2020	Ron Massey Cup	N/A	0	0	Competition Cancelled	1	0	1	0	4	12	-8
2020	President's Cup	4	1	12	Semi-Finalist	9	5	1	3	202	114	88

=== Sydney Shield ===
Year	Competition	Ladder			Finals Position	All Match Record						
Year	Competition	Pos	Byes	Pts	Finals Position	P	W	L	D	For	Agst	Diff
2014	Sydney Shield	9	0	15		22	7	14	1	552	694	-142
2015	Sydney Shield	5	2	29	Grand Finalist	24	15	8	1	718	500	218
2016	Sydney Shield	12	0	14		22	7	15	0	626	738	-112
2017	Sydney Shield	10	3	16		22	5	17	0	340	712	-372
2018	Sydney Shield	10	2	8		18	2	16	0	264	826	-562
2019	Sydney Shield	9	1	14		20	6	14	0	506	736	-230
2020	Sydney Shield	5	0	2	Competition Cancelled	1	1	0	0	24	20	4
2020	Sydney Shield	5	1	11		8	4	3	1	226	158	68

=== Metropolitan Cup ===
Year	Competition	Ladder			Finals Position	All Match Record						
Year	Competition	Pos	Byes	Pts	Finals Position	P	W	L	D	For	Agst	Diff
1990	Metropolitan Cup	2		18	Grand Finalist							
1991	Metropolitan Cup	8		8								
1992	Metropolitan Cup	8	2	17		16	6	9	1	288	292	-4
1993	Metropolitan Cup	5	2	23		16	9	6	1	329	271	58
1994	Metropolitan Cup	4	0	22	Grand Finalist	24	13	11	0	438	431	7
1995	Metropolitan Cup	7	2	10		18	2	16	0	234	519	-285

== See also ==
- List of rugby league clubs in Australia
- Rugby league in New South Wales
