= Raymond Saade =

Australian rugby league footballer

Personal information
- Born: 6 March 1990 (age 36) Sydney, Australia

Playing information
- Position: Hooker, Fullback
Club
Years	Team	Pld	T	G	FG	P
2016	Wentworthville Magpies

Raymond Saade (born 6 March 1990 in Sydney, Australia) is a former professional rugby league footballer. A hooker and fullback, who played for the Wentworthville Magpies in the NSW Cup. In October 2015, Saade signed with the Wentworthville Magpies for the 2016 New South Wales Cup Season.
