= Group 12 Rugby League =

Group 12 is a defunct rugby league competition based around the outback city of Broken Hill in New South Wales, Australia. The last premiership was held in 1997 when Wilcannia beat Menindee.

== Teams ==
Former Group 12 teams included:

- Broken Hill Geebungs
- Broken Hill Saints
- Broken Hill United
- Menindee Yabbies
- Wilcannia Boomerangs
- Wilcannia Tigers

== First Grade Champions ==
Season	Champion	Score	Runners-up
1980	Broken Hill Saints	Unknown	Unknown
1981	Broken Hill Saints		
1982	Broken Hill Saints		Menindee
1983	Broken Hill Saints	22-12	Menindee
1984	Broken Hill United	19 - 0	Broken Hill Saints
1985	Broken Hill United	21-20	Wilcannia Tigers
1986	Wilcannia Boomerangs	unknown	Broken Hill United
1987	Broken Hill United	15-12	Wilcannia Boomerangs
1988	Broken Hill United	31-20	Wilcannia Boomerangs
1989	broken hill saints	18-14	broken hill united
1990	Broken Hill Saints	18-0	Broken Hill United
1991	Wilcannia Boomerangs	34-20	Menindee Yabbies
1992			
1993	Menindee	36-20	Wilcania
1994	Broken Hill United	46-18	Wilcannia Boomerangs
1995	Broken Hill United	28-20	Wilcannia Boomerangs
1996	Wilcannia Boomerangs	38-34	Broken Hill Geebungs
1997	Wilcania	56-48	Menindee

== Re-emergence ==
The Group 12 competition has been now been revived but in a different form as the Outback Rugby League. Some of the Original Group 12 clubs have returned to the new league. The 2013 Competition teams are:

- Broken Hill Saints
- Broken Hill GeeBungs
- Broken Hill Young Guns (juniors only)
- Wilcannia Boomerangs
- Wilcannia Warriors
- Menindee Yabbies
- Menindee Wedgetails (Eagles)
- Broken Hill United joined the ORL 2014 ...
