= George Brackenreg =

George Stubbs Brackenreg (1858–1928) was an Australian entrepreneur and a co-founder of Rugby League in Australia.

Brackenreg, along with J J Giltinan, Victor Trumper, Jack Feneley and Henry Hoyle, set up the New South Wales Rugby Football League (NSWRFL) as a breakaway from rugby union football in Sydney during August 1907. He is also remembered as a major influence behind the creation of the South Sydney District Rugby League Football Club in 1908. He was awarded Life Membership of the NSWRFL in 1914.

Brackenreg died at his mistress' Randwick home on 30 May 1928, aged 70. He was interred at Rookwood Cemetery.
