= Preseason Cup =

New South Wales Rugby League competition

The Craven Mild Cup was a competition held by the New South Wales Rugby League (NSWRL) in Australia before the start of the season proper, from 1962 until 1981. From 1962 to 1969 it was simply known as the Preseason Cup, before tobacco company W.D. & H.O. Wills took up sponsorship - with the competition rebranded the Wills Cup - in 1970, and the Craven Mild Cup for its last four seasons, from 1978 to 1981.

The Preseason Cup first took place over March 1961, with matches played at night under lights at the Sydney Sportsground, Redfern Oval and Lidcombe Oval. The halves were played 35 minutes each. In March 1962, the Berries won the Preseason Cup, beating Western Suburbs 14-10 under floodlights at the Sydney Sportsground.

In 1972, an estimated 251,000 spectators watched matches in the competition.

The NSWRL competition clubs made up the participants, except in 1970 when Wentworthville and Sydney Uni took park as well.

The competition was discontinued in 1982 due the increased length of the NSWRL regular season with its expansion to 14 clubs.

== Results ==
| Year | Winner | Score | Loser |
|---|---|---|---|
| 1962 | Canterbury | 14-10 | Western Suburbs |
| 1963 | St George | 17-6 | Balmain |
| 1964 | St George | 41-14 | North Sydney |
| 1965 | St George | 15-7 | Western Suburbs |
| 1966 | South Sydney | 11-3 | North Sydney |
| 1967 | Balmain | 11-10 | Manly-Warringah |
| 1968 | Penrith | 28-12 | Newtown |
| 1969 | South Sydney | 19-7 | Western Suburbs |
| 1970 | Canterbury | 20-11 | St George |
| 1971 | St George | 20-7 | Cronulla-Sutherland |
| 1972 | South Sydney | 11-10 | Eastern Suburbs |
| 1973 | Newtown | 17-15 | St George |
| 1974 | Eastern Suburbs | 43-0 | South Sydney |
| 1975 | Parramatta | 11-5 | Manly-Warringah |
| 1976 | Balmain | 17-5 | Manly-Warringah |
| 1977 | Eastern Suburbs | 13-9 | North Sydney |
| 1978 | South Sydney | 10-3 | Canterbury-Bankstown |
| 1979 | Eastern Suburbs | 12-9 | Balmain |
| 1980 | Manly-Warringah | 21-12 | Balmain |
| 1981 | Eastern Suburbs | 12-3 | Parramatta |
