= Jamie Humphreys =

Australian rugby league footballer (born 2005)

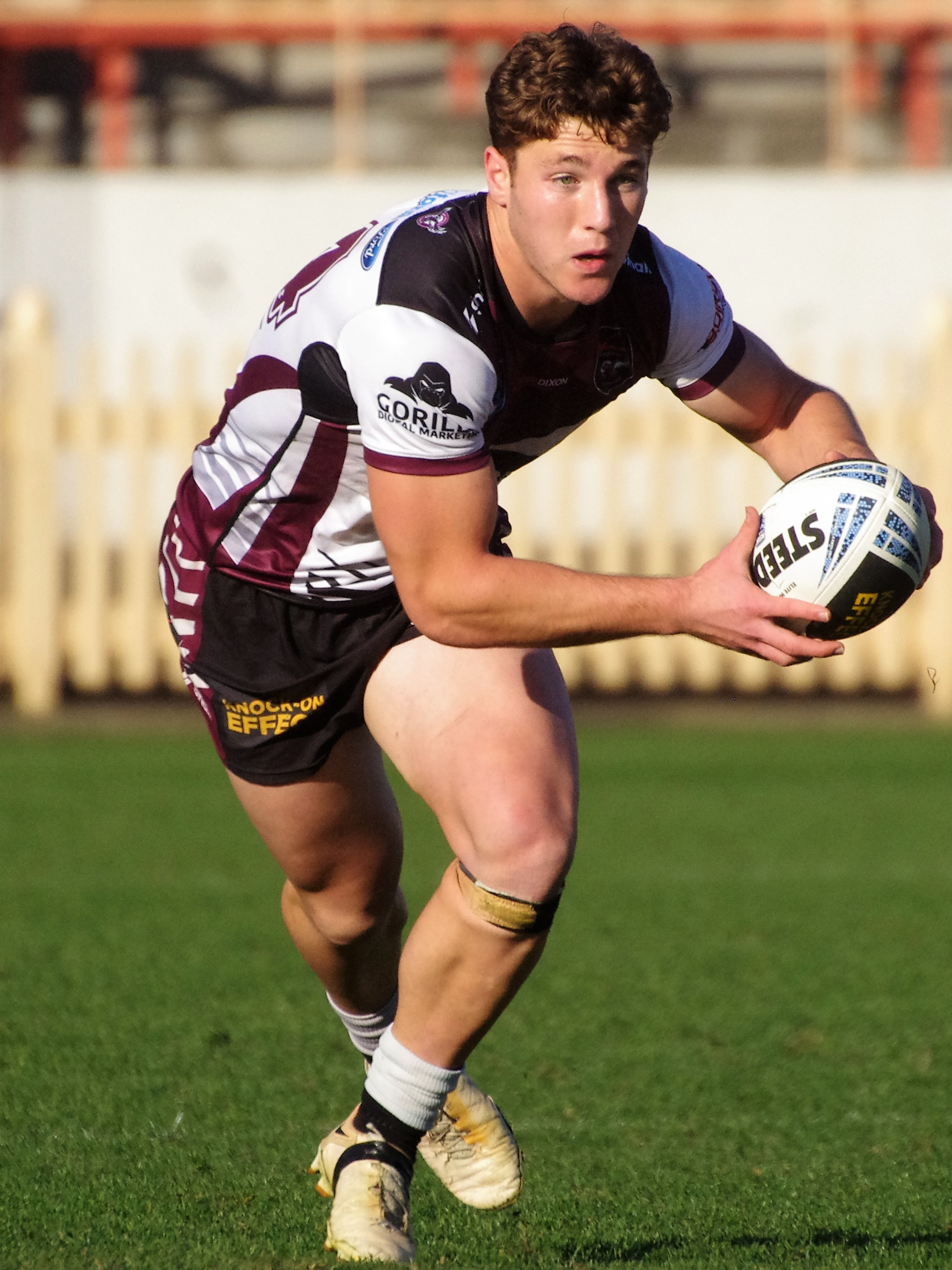

Personal information
- Full name: Jamie Humphreys
- Born: 2 January 2002 (age 24) Sydney, New South Wales, Australia
- Height: 183 cm (6 ft 0 in)
- Weight: 94 kg (14 st 11 lb)

Playing information
- Position: Halfback
Club
Years	Team	Pld	T	G	FG	P
2024	Manly Sea Eagles	1	1	3	0	10
2025–	South Sydney Rabbitohs	36	3	17	1	47
	Total	37	4	20	1	57
- Source: As of 10 November 2026
- Father: Stephen Humphreys
- Relatives: Kevin Humphreys (grandfather)

Jamie Humphreys (born 2 January 2002) is an Australian professional rugby league footballer who plays as a halfback for the South Sydney Rabbitohs in the National Rugby League.

Humphreys was a ball boy for the Wests Tigers during 2011-2013 season. He then travelled to England with his family and came through at the London Broncos, playing for the U16s through to the to U19s in their academy system.

In round 19 of the 2024 NRL season, Humphreys made his NRL debut for the Manly Warringah Sea Eagles against the Newcastle Knights at Brookvale Oval in a 44-6 win. Humphreys signed a deal with the South Sydney Rabbitohs until the end of 2026.

In Round 1 of the 2025 NRL season, Humphreys made his South Sydney debut against the Dolphins at Commbank Stadium. In round 2, Humphreys kicked the winning field goal as South Sydney defeated St. George Illawarra 25-24.

On 8 April 2025, it was announced that Humphreys would miss at least four weeks with a hamstring injury. Humphreys played 18 matches for South Sydney in the 2025 NRL season which saw the club finish 14th on the table. Humphreys played 18 matches for South Sydney in the 2026 NRL season as the club finished 6th on the table and qualified for the finals.

On 10 November 2026, the Rabbitohs announced that Humphreys had re-signed with the club until the end of 2028.

== Personal life ==
Humphreys is a third-generation player in Australian rugby league; his father, Stephen Humphreys, and grandfather, Kevin Humphreys, both played for Balmain Tigers.
