= Leichhardt Wanderers =

Rugby league club in Australia

Club information
- Full name: Leichhardt Wanderers District Rugby League Football Club
- Nickname: Wanderers
- Colours: Red; Black; White
- Founded: 1911

Current details
- Ground: Blackmore Oval, Leichardt
- Competition: Balmain Rugby League
- Current season

The Leichhardt Wanderers are a rugby league club based at Leichhardt, New South Wales. They compete in the Sydney Combined Competition. Their jersey is traditionally predominantly Red and Black. In recent years they have included white in their jersey. There were a number of Leichhardt clubs in the early years of Rugby League - Leichhardt Royals played in the Balmain JRL in 1908 and won the NSWRL 3rd Grade premiership in 1911. This club's final season was 1922. Leichhardt Gladstone won the C Grade of the Western Suburbs JRL in 1914, its first season in Rugby League. These two clubs had previously played Rugby Union. In 1918, Leichhardt Wanderers was formed by persons associated with the Leichhardt Boxing Stadium. Gladstone and Wanderers had a keen rivalry firstly in the Western Suburbs JRL where Gladstone were premiers in 1918 and then in the Annandale and Glebe competitions and finally in the Balmain JRL. Gladstone disbanded in the early 1940s.

== Notable Juniors ==
- Corey Pearson (1995–2004 Wests Tigers, St George Illawarra Dragons & Parramatta Eels)
- Adam Wright (1995-1997 South Sydney Rabbitohs)
- Ben Kusto (1997–2002 St George Dragons & Parramatta Eels)
- Robbie Farah (2003– Wests Tigers, South Sydney Rabbitohs)
- Bronson Harrison (2004–14 Wests Tigers, Canberra Raiders & St George Illawarra Dragons)
- Jarred Farlow (2013–14 Wests Tigers)
- Luke Brooks (2013– Wests Tigers & Manly Warringah Sea Eagles)
- Kane Evans (2014– Sydney Roosters & Parramatta Eels)
- Kyle Lovett (2015–18 Wests Tigers)
- Eloni Vunakece (2016–18 Sydney Roosters)
- Lachlan Ilias (2021– South Sydney Rabbitohs, St George Illawarra Dragons & Gold Coast Titans)
- Mark Nawaqanitawase (2024- Sydney Roosters)

== See also ==
- Rugby league in New South Wales
