= Stephen Humphreys (rugby league) =

Australian rugby league footballer (born 1960)

Personal information
- Full name: Stephen John Humphreys
- Born: 13 March 1960 (age 66) Sydney, New South Wales, Australia

Playing information
- Position: Wing, Fullback
Club
Years	Team	Pld	T	G	FG	P
1983–87	Balmain Tigers	42	12	0	0	48
- Source: As of 16 January 2023
- Father: Kevin Humphreys
- Relatives: Jamie Humphreys (son)

Stephen Humphreys is an Australian former professional rugby league footballer and administrator who played in the 1980s. He played for Balmain in NSWRL competition.

== Background ==
Humphreys is the son of former Balmain player and rugby league administrator Kevin Humphreys.

== Playing career ==
Humphreys made his first grade debut for Balmain in round 14 of the 1983 NSWRFL season against Eastern Suburbs at the Sydney Sports Ground. Humphreys would go on to make 42 appearances for the club over five seasons. Humphreys played two finals matches for Balmain in the 1985 NSWRL season against Parramatta and Canterbury.

== Post playing ==
Following retirement, Humphreys was CEO of the Wests Tigers. He then became the general manager of the NSWRL before being headhunted by British Airways to become their global head of sales in 2014. In 2019, Humphreys became CEO at Manly before resigning in 2022.
