= Wentworthville Magpies =

Australian rugby league club, based in Sydney, NSW

Club information
- Full name: Wentworthville Magpies; Rugby League; Football Club
- Nickname: Wenty
- Colours: Black; White
- Founded: 1937; 89 years ago (or 1963)

Current details
- Ground: Ringrose Park
- Coach: unknown
- Competition: New South Wales Cup; Ron Massey Cup; Parramatta Rugby League; Sydney Shield; NSWRL Women's Premiership

Records
- Premierships: 1 (2008)

The Wentworthville Magpies, colloquially known as Wenty, are an Australian rugby league team based in the suburb of Wentworthville in Sydney's Western Suburbs. Founded in 1963 (or 1937), the club has competed in various Sydney district competitions and, since 2003, the semi-professional Ron Massey Cup and Sydney Shield competitions in NSW, Australia. The club also fielded a team in the Canterbury Cup NSW as part of a joint-venture with the Parramatta Eels between 2008 and 2019 acting as Parramatta's feeder club.

== Inter-District/Second Division/Metropolitan Cup ==
During this period Wentworthville ("The Magpies") was the most successful club at this level of competition, competing in every grand final of the Second Division between 1964 and 1973 (winning all but the 1966 and 1972 grand finals).

The club won a total of 8 premierships during the history of the Second Division (including 5 in a row between 1967 and 1971). Due to their domination of the competition 'Wenty' was widely considered the best candidate for promotion to the NSWRL Premiership when two positions were made available for the 1967 competition. Due to their proximity to Parramatta, where a Premiership club was established in 1946, the Magpies were overlooked.

When the Second Division was reorganised as the Metropolitan League in 1974 the Magpies left the competition to play in the Illawarra Rugby League competition, believing they could find greater competition on the South Coast. They failed to repeat this success in the Illawarra competition.

The club returned to the Sydney competition when it was reorganised as the Metropolitan Cup in 1990, winning premierships in 1998 and 1999.

== Wills Cup ==
Wentworthville had one opportunity to compete against Sydney's first-grade clubs when they were invited, as champions of the 1969 Second Division, to compete in the 1970 NSWRL pre-season competition (then known as the Wills Cup). Second Division 1969 runners-up University of Sydney were also invited to participate.

Wentworthville finished 12th (above Penrith Panthers and University) in the competition with 1 win and 3 losses and a points differential of −21. They played games against Parramatta, University, Penrith and Western Suburbs. Their win came against local rivals Parramatta, winning 12–8 at Cumberland Oval but they failed to defeat fellow Second Division club, University, narrowly losing 19–17.

Despite a promising win against a top-flight side the experiment of inviting Second Division teams to participate in first-grade competitions was not considered a success and was never repeated.

== Jim Beam Cup/Bundaberg Red Cup/Ron Massey Cup ==
The Wentworthville Magpies joined the NSWRL Jim Beam Cup in its first year in 2003 and were runners-up to The Entrance Tigers in the 2003 Grand Final. In 2009 they won the Bundaberg Red Grand Final against the Cabramatta 'Two' Blues. Since 2009, Wentworthville have won the competition another five times in 2010, 2012, 2013, 2017 and 2018.

== NSWRL State League/Premier League ==
In 2007, Parramatta Eels announced that they would form a joint-venture with the club to play in the NSWRL Premier League/State League. The Team includes players from both the Eels and the Magpies from the Bundaberg Red Cup. The joint-venture won their first Premiership in 2008, defeating the Newtown Jets in Golden Point Extra Time, with the match duration lasting in excess of 100 minutes.

During the 2008 season, such names as internationals Joe Galuvao, Eric Grothe, and Krisnan Inu all played for the club, along with fellow regular first graders Ben Smith, Tim Smith, Junior Paulo, Weller Hauraki and Todd Lowrie among others.

The Magpies and Eels once again joined forces in the NSW Cup in 2009. In addition, the Magpies also fielded a team in the Bundaberg Red Cup (formerly the Jim Beam Cup), with both competitions running concurrently.

Since making the grand final in 2008, Wentworthville have been competitive in The Intrust Super Premiership NSW finishing 2011 in 6th place, 2012 in 4th place, 2013 in 8th place, 2014 in 4th place, 2015 as wooden spooners and in 2016 they finished 9th.

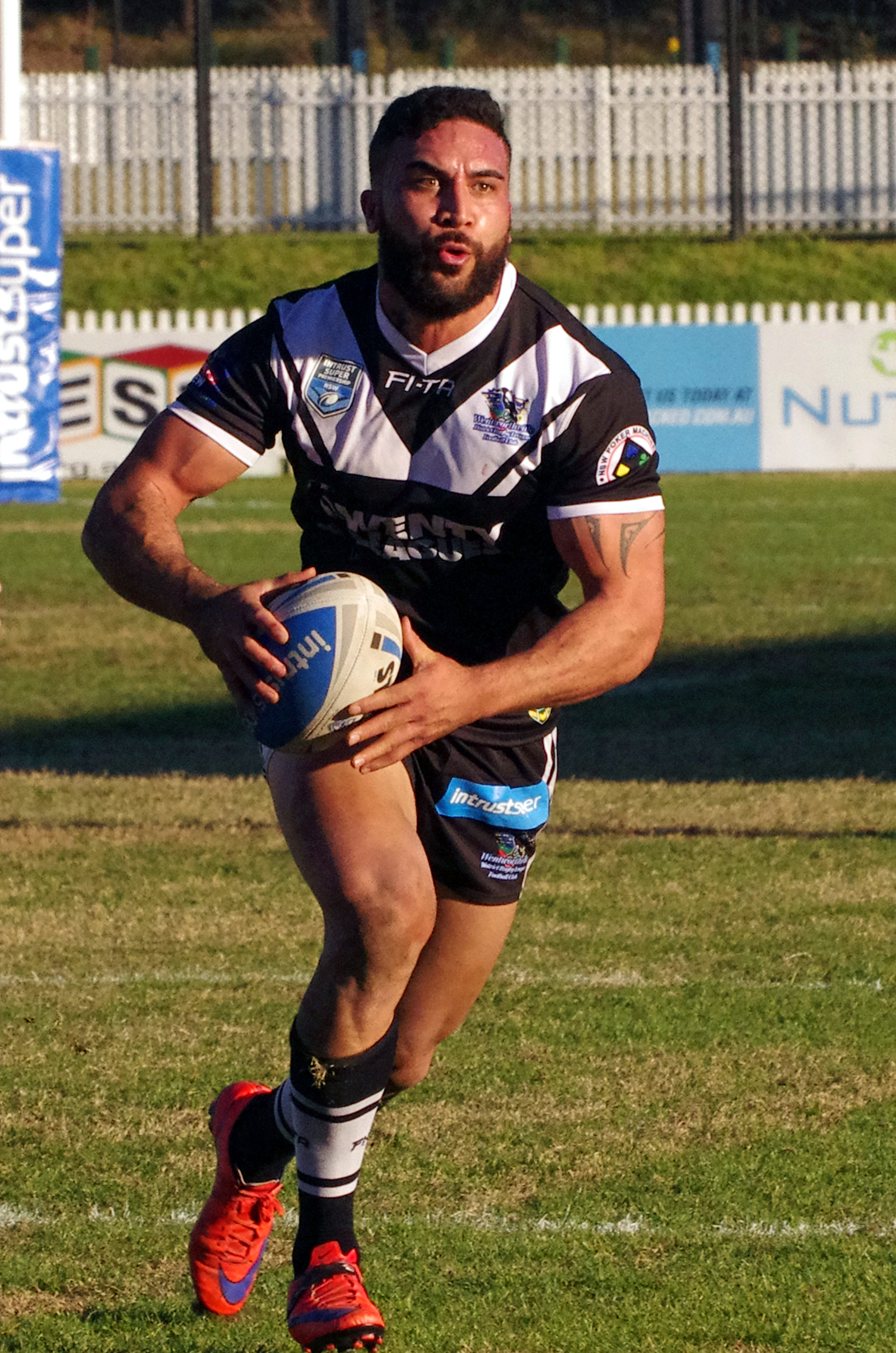
Roydon Gillett playing for the Wentworthville Magpies in the New South Wales Cup

In the 2017 NSW Cup season, Wentworthville missed out on the finals for the third straight year finishing 9th on the table and missing out on the finals by 3 points. In the 2018 NSW Cup season, Wentworthville finished in 10th place on the table missing out on the finals by 2 competition points.

In October 2018, Nathan Cayless resigned as head coach of the club. The Parramatta Eels also announced that they would be ending their partnership with Wentworthville after the conclusion of the 2019 season. Parramatta CEO Bernie Gurr spoke to the media saying "Out of the review we found if we want to be a successful development club we need to have the Parramatta Eels in the ISP. Then you've got a clear one-club mentality". On 2 November 2018, former Parramatta reserve grade and Wentworthville coach Rip Taylor was announced as the new head coach for the 2019 season.

On 22 April 2019, Wentworthville played in the first ever game at the new Western Sydney Stadium which was against Western Suburbs with Wentworthville running out winners 20-14. Wentworthville player Bevan French scored the first ever try at the new venue.

Wentworthville finished the 2019 Canterbury Cup NSW season in eighth position on the table and qualified for the finals. Wentworthville then produced upset victories over Penrith, Canterbury-Bankstown and South Sydney to reach the 2019 Canterbury Cup NSW grand final.

In the grand final against Newtown, Wentworthville would go on to lose the match 20-15 at Bankwest Stadium after extra-time.

== Notable Juniors ==
Also see Category:Wentworthville Magpies players

Notable First Grade Players that have played at Wentworthville Magpies include:

- Phil Gould (1976–1986 Penrith Panthers, Newtown Jets, Canterbury-Bankstown & South Sydney Rabbitohs)
- Lew Zivanovic (1979–86 Penrith Panthers)
- Scott Pethybridge (1994–2002 Penrith Panthers, Norths, Auckland Warriors)
- Nathan Cayless (1997–2010 Parramatta Eels)
- Steven Crouch (1999–2004 Parramatta Eels, Manly-Warringah & Sydney)
- John Wilson (2000–08 Parramatta Eels, Wests Tigers & Catalans Dragons)
- Jason Cayless (2000–10 Parramatta Eels, Sydney, St. Helens & Wests Tigers)
- Chad Robinson (2000–09 Parramatta Eels, Sydney & Harlequins FC)
- Paul Gallen (2001–2019 Cronulla-Sutherland)
- Taniela Lasalo (2009– Parramatta Eels)
- Jorge Tafua (2012– Manly-Warringah, Wakefield Trinity)
- Ken Sio (2012– Parramatta Eels, Newcastle Knights, Salford Red Devils, Hull Kingston Rovers)
- Will Skelton (2013– NSW Waratahs)
- John Asiata (2014– North Queensland Cowboys, Leigh)
- Manaia Cherrington (2015–2016) Wests Tigers)
- Fabian Goodall (2016– Manly-Warringah)
- Ryan Matterson (2016– Sydney Roosters, Wests Tigers, Parramatta)
- Matt Eisenhuth (2017– Wests Tigers)
- James Maloney (2009– Melbourne, Auckland Warriors, Eastern Suburbs, Cronulla-Sutherland, Penrith Panthers, Catalans Dragons Catalans Dragons)
- Haze Dunster (2020– Parramatta Eels)
- Tom Amone (2019– South Sydney Rabbitohs & Wests Tigers)

== Honours ==
- Intrust Super Premiership NSW
  - Winner: 2008
- Ron Massey Cup (and previous third tier competitions)
  - Winner: (Record) 1964, 1965, 1967, 1968, 1969, 1970, 1971, 1973, 1998, 1999, 2009, 2010, 2012, 2013, 2017, 2018, 2019
  - Minor Premiers: 1964, 1965, 1966, 1968, 1969, 1970, 1971, 1997, 1998, 2009, 2014, 2018, 2019
- Sydney Shield
  - Winner: 2012, 2015
  - Minor Premiers: 2015, 2021, 2025
- Second Division Reserve Grade
  - Winner: 1964, 1965, 1966, 1968, 1969, 1970
  - Minor Premiers: 1965, 1968, 1969, 1970, 1971, 1972

== Playing Record in NSW Competitions ==
=== Second Tier ===
The Wentworthville-Parramatta joint venture participated in second-tier, NSWRL competitions for twelve seasons.

Year	Competition	Ladder			Finals Position	All Match Record						
Year	Competition	Pos	Byes	Pts	Finals Position	P	W	L	D	For	Agst	Diff
2008	NSW Cup	2	0	33	Premiers	25	19	5	1	705	426	279
2009	NSW Cup	3	2	28	Last 4 Preliminary Finalist	23	13	10	0	600	434	166
2010	NSW Cup	6	0	25	Last 6 Semi-Finalist	27	12	14	1	822	757	65
2011	NSW Cup	5	2	29	Last 6 Semi-Finalist	25	12	12	1	582	672	-90
2012	NSW Cup	4	2	32	Last 6 Semi-Finalist	26	14	12	0	846	601	245
2013	NSW Cup	8	2	26	Top 8 Elimination Semi-Finalist	25	11	14	0	683	769	-86
2014	NSW Cup	3	2	34	Last 4 Preliminary Finalist	27	16	11	0	771	730	41
2015	NSW Cup	12	3	18	Wooden Spoon	22	6	16	0	402	627	-225
2016	Intrust Premiership	9	3	26		25	10	12	0	472	573	-101
2017	Intrust Premiership	9	3	24		22	9	13	0	499	465	34
2018	Intrust Premiership	10	2	22		22	9	13	0	436	583	-147
2019	Canterbury Cup	8	1	24	Grand Finalist	26	14	12	9	604	551	53

=== Third Tier ===
Year	Competition	Ladder			Finals Position	All Match Record						
Year	Competition	Pos	Byes	Pts	Finals Position	P	W	L	D	For	Agst	Diff
1963	Inter-District	3		24	Semi-Finalist	19	11	6	2	183	105	78
1964	Second Division	1	0	30	Premiers	20	17	3	0	457	155	302
1965	Second Division	1	0	29	Premiers	19	16	2	1	470	118	352
1966	Second Division	1	0	24	Grand Finalist							
1967	Second Division	2	0	22	Premiers	16	13	3	0	374	138	236
1968	Second Division	1	2	30	Premiers	18	17	1	0	412	144	268
1969	Second Division	1	0	27	Premiers	18	15	2	1	421	139	282
1970	Second Division	1	2	38	Premiers	22	20	2	0	520	162	358
1971	Second Division	1	2	38	Premiers	23	20	1	2	692	205	487
1972	Second Division	3	2	38	Grand Finalist	23	19	4	0	717	231	486
1973	Second Division	2	2	36	Grand Finalist	23	19	4	0	659	221	438
1990	Metropolitan Cup	5		15								
1991	Metropolitan Cup	2		21	Finalist							
1992	Metropolitan Cup	4	2	21	Finalist	18	9	7	2	325	292	33
1993	Metropolitan Cup	9	2	6	Wooden Spoon	16	1	15	0	206	408	-202
1994	Metropolitan Cup	7	0	13		21	6	14	1	416	517	-101
1995	Metropolitan Cup	2	2	30	Grand Finalist							
1996	Metropolitan Cup	2	2	28	Finalist	18	12	6	0	506	317	189
1997	Metropolitan Cup	1		20	Finalist							
1998	Metropolitan Cup	1	0	26	Premiers	21	16	5	0	508	345	163
1999	Metropolitan Cup	3		22	Premiers	19	14	7	0	491	365	126
2000	Metropolitan Cup	6	0	13		14	6	7	1	371	284	87
2001	Metropolitan Cup	7	3	12	Wooden Spoon	18	3	15	0	324	556	-232
2002	Metropolitan Cup	3	0	16	Semi-Finalist	16	8	8	0	404	316	88
2003	Jim Beam Cup	2	0	34	Grand Finalist	26	18	6	2	898	508	390
2004	Jim Beam Cup	5	2	28	Semi-Finalist	21	12	9	0	612	456	156
2005	Jim Beam Cup	4	3	26	Finalist	22	13	7	2	703	475	228
2006	Jim Beam Cup	3	2	23	Semi-Finalist	18	9	8	1	430	360	70
2007	Jim Beam Cup	5	0	29	Semi-Finalist	24	15	8	1	696	370	326
2008	Jim Beam Cup	7	0	21		22	10	11	1	581	609	-28
2009	Bundaberg Red Cup	1	0	27	Premiers	20	15	4	1	541	394	147
2010	Bundaberg Red Cup	2	0	26	Premiers	24	16	8	0	772	617	155
2011	Bundaberg Red Cup	4	0	22	Elimination Semi-Finalist	22	11	11	0	579	596	-17
2012	Bundaberg Red Cup	2	0	27	Premiers	22	16	5	1	837	396	441
2013	Ron Massey Cup	3	0	30	Premiers	25	18	7	0	916	503	413
2014	Ron Massey Cup	1	0	29	Last 4 Preliminary Finalist	24	15	8	1	764	538	226
2015	Ron Massey Cup	2	2	32	Last 4 Preliminary Finalist	22	15	7	0	638	361	277
2016	Ron Massey Cup	3	2	32	Last 4 Preliminary Finalist	22	15	7	0	668	385	283
2017	Ron Massey Cup	2	7	40	Premiers	21	16	5	0	582	372	210
2018	Ron Massey Cup	1	2	33	Premiers	21	17	3	1	663	314	349
2019	Ron Massey Cup	1	2	38	Premiers	23	20	3	0	691	280	411
2020	Ron Massey Cup	N/A	0	2	Competition Cancelled	1	1	0	0	18	14	4
2020	President's Cup	8	1	4		8	1	0	7	122	221	-99

=== Fourth Tier ===
Year	Competition	Ladder			Finals Position	All Match Record						
Year	Competition	Pos	Byes	Pts	Finals Position	P	W	L	D	For	Agst	Diff
2014	Sydney Shield	2	0	32	Last 6 Semi-Finalist	22	16	6	0	852	518	334
2015	Sydney Shield	1	2	38	Premiers	23	20	3	0	798	470	328
2016	Sydney Shield	7	0	24	Last 6 Semi-Finalist	24	13	11	0	798	744	54
2017	Sydney Shield	3	3	37	Last 4 Preliminary Finalist	24	16	7	1	817	568	249
2018	Sydney Shield	4	2	30	Last 4 Preliminary Finalist	20	14	6	0	705	440	265
2019	Sydney Shield	7	1	22	Top 8 Elimination Semi-Finalist	21	10	11	0	600	547	53
2020	Sydney Shield	N/A	0	2	Competition Cancelled	1	1	0	0	28	16	12
2020	Sydney Shield	9	1	3	Wooden Spoon	8	0	7	1	54	224	-170

== See also ==
- National Rugby League reserves affiliations
- List of rugby league clubs in Australia
- Rugby league in New South Wales
