= Cronulla-Sutherland District Rugby Football League =

Australian sporting competition

- Sport: Rugby league
- Instituted: 1964
- Number of teams: 16 (11 senior)
- Region: Sutherland Shire, Sydney (New South Wales Rugby League)
- Premiers: St Joseph’s JRLFC (2023)
- Related competition: Sydney Combined Competition

The Cronulla-Sutherland District Rugby Football League (Cronulla-Sutherland District Junior Rugby Football League in the case of junior football) is an amateur competition for rugby league clubs in and around the Sutherland Shire district of Sydney, New South Wales, Australia.

The Cronulla-Sutherland District Rugby Football League was formed in the early 1950s following the formation of several new Sutherland Shire based clubs and the arrangement of a committee that would eventually become the CSDRFL. All Shire based clubs had previously played in several Inter-District matches throughout the year but with the formation of a localised Sutherland league these were no longer deemed necessary.

The Cronulla-Sutherland Junior District Rugby Football League was formed in 1963 after a general meeting among several of the already established junior clubs whom decided it would be beneficial to form and arrange an annual competition amongst themselves and other teams in the Sutherland Shire.

Since its inception several new teams have gradually joined the association where the team numbers now stand at a total of sixteen clubs.

== District clubs ==
Club	Formed	Home Ground
Aquinas Holy Family Colts	1992	Blaxland Oval
Como Jannali	1947	Scylla Bay Oval
Cronulla-Caringbah Sharks	1952	Cronulla High School
De La Salle		Woolooware Oval
Engadine Dragons	1958	ANZAC Park
Gymea Gorillas	1952	Corea Oval
Kurnell Stingrays	1991	Marton Park
Menai Roosters	1984	Akuna Oval
St John Bosco Bulldogs		Boystown Oval
St Josephs	1964	Kareela Oval
St Patricks JRLFC	1956	
Sutherland Loftus United	1912	Sutherland Oval
Taren Point Titans	2004	Gwawley Oval
Yarrawarrah Tigers		Yarrawarrah Oval

== Southern Open Age ==
Southern Open Age (previously known as Cronulla A-Grade) is the premier rugby league competition clubs in the Cronulla-Sutherland and St. George districts of Sydney. After absorbing the St. George District A-Grade competition in 2021, the competition now features 12 clubs in 2023, across two divisions, Gold (First Grade) and Silver (Second Grade), the latter of which is split into two conferences.

=== Southern Open Age Gold ===
Club	Moniker	Home Ground	Suburb
Como-Jannali	Crocodiles	Scylla Bay Oval	Como, New South Wales
De La Salle Caringbah	Saints	Captain Cook Oval	Caringbah, New South Wales
Engadine	Dragons	ANZAC Oval	Engadine, New South Wales
Gymea	Gorillas	Corea Oval	Gymea, New South Wales
Kogarah	Cougars	Todd Park	Kogarah, New South Wales
St John Bosco	Bulldogs	Boystown Oval	Sutherland, New South Wales
St Joseph's	Kangaroos	Kareela Oval	Sutherland, New South Wales

=== Southern Open Age Silver A ===
Club	Moniker	Home Ground	Suburb
Como-Jannali	Crocodiles	Scylla Bay Oval	Como, New South Wales
De La Salle Caringbah	Saints	Captain Cook Oval	Caringbah, New South Wales
Gymea	Gorillas	Corea Oval	Gymea, New South Wales
Renown United	United	Renown Park	Sydney, New South Wales
St John Bosco	Bulldogs	Boystown Oval	Sutherland, New South Wales
St Joseph's	Kangaroos	Kareela Oval	Sutherland, New South Wales
Taren Point	Titans	Gwawley Oval	Taren Point, New South Wales

=== Southern Open Age Silver B ===
Club	Moniker	Home Ground	Suburb
Aquinas	Colts	Blaxland Oval	Sutherland, New South Wales
Cronulla-Caringbah	Sharks	Cronulla High School	Cronulla, New South Wales
Engadine	Dragons	ANZAC Oval	Engadine, New South Wales
Kingsgrove	Colts	Beverley Hills Park	Kingsgrove, New South Wales
Riverwood Legion Club	Riverwood	Riverwood Park	Sutherland, New South Wales

== Notable players ==
Since the establishments of both the CSDRFL and the CSDJRFL many local players have gone on to play first grade for many of the Australian and overseas professional teams contained in the National Rugby League and the Super League.

The vast majority of these players have usually gone on to appear for both the local sides in the area; the Cronulla-Sutherland Sharks and the St. George Dragons/St George Illawarra Dragons.

=== Internationals ===
Player	Country	CSDRFL Club	Professional Clubs
Daniel Vasquez	Chile	St Josephs	Cronulla Sharks
Robbie Kearns	Australia	Engadine / Bosco	Cronulla-Sutherland Sharks / Western Reds / Melbourne Storm
Mark Lennon	Wales	Como Jannali	Castleford Tigers / Manly-Warringah Sea Eagles
Cliff Lyons	Australia	Como Jannali	North Sydney Bears / Leeds Rhinos / Manly-Warringah Sea Eagles
Mark McGaw	Australia	Engadine	Cronulla-Sutherland Sharks / Penrith Panthers / South Sydney Rabbitohs
Greg Pierce	Australia	Gymea	Cronulla-Sutherland Sharks
Aaron Raper	Australia	De La Salle	Cronulla-Sutherland Sharks / Parramatta Eels
Russell Richardson	Australia	Como Jannali	Cronulla-Sutherland Sharks / South Sydney Rabbitohs / Newcastle Knights
Mat Rogers	Australia	Engadine	Cronulla-Sutherland Sharks / Gold Coast Titans
Steve Rogers	Australia	Sutherland-Loftus	Cronulla-Sutherland Sharks / St. George Dragons
Ben Sammut	Malta	De La Salle	Cronulla-Sutherland Sharks

== See also ==
- Balmain District Junior Rugby League
- Manly-Warringah/North Sydney District Rugby League
- Parramatta Junior Rugby League
- Penrith District Rugby League
- South Sydney District Junior Rugby Football League
- Sydney Roosters Juniors
- Rugby League Competitions in Australia
