= Jarred Farlow =

Australian rugby league footballer

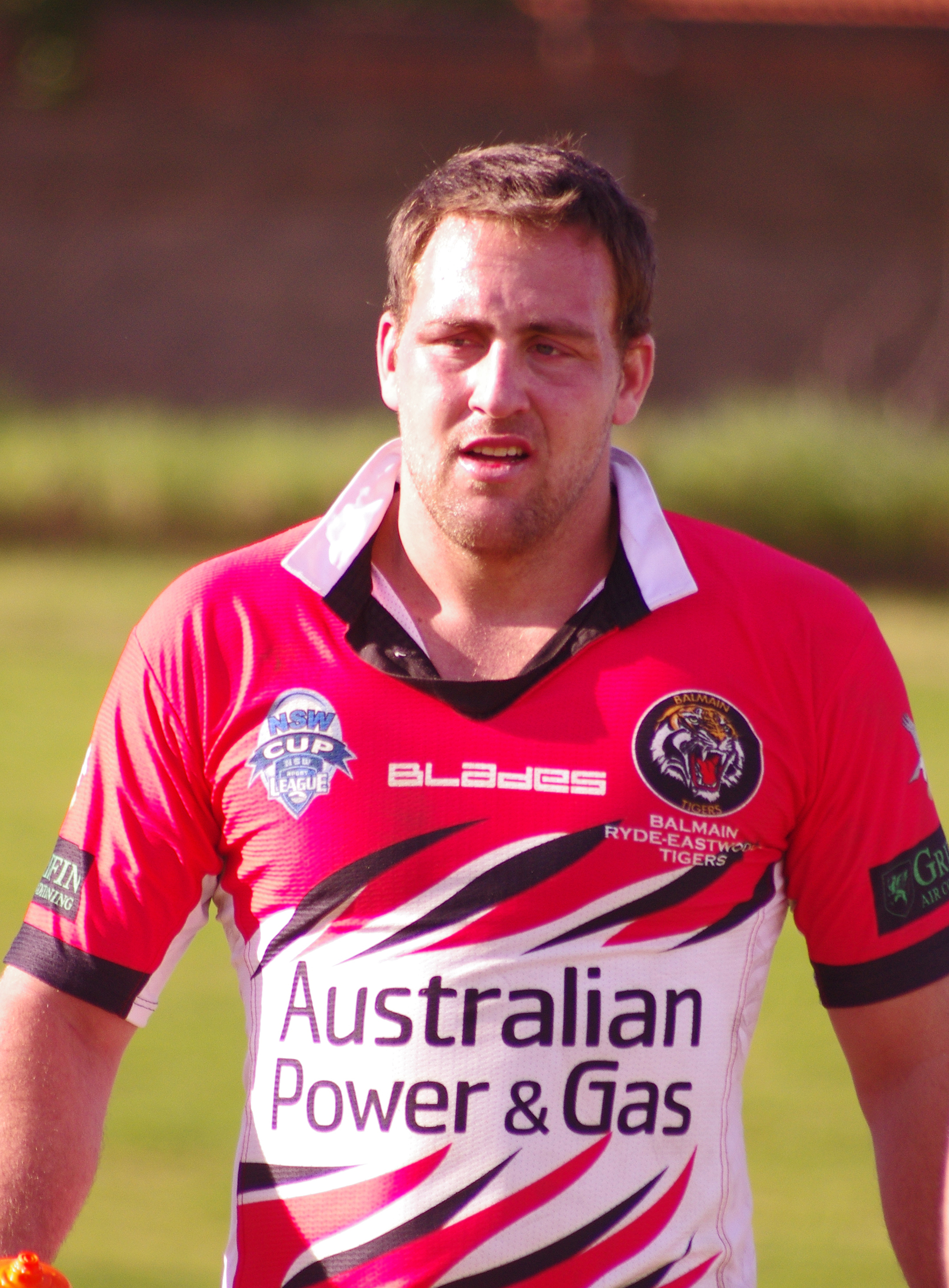
- Farlow playing for the Balmain Ryde-Eastwood Tigers

Personal information
- Born: 17 October 1986 (age 40) Baulkham Hills, New South Wales, Australia

Playing information
- Height: 185 cm (6 ft 1 in)
- Weight: 99 kg (15 st 8 lb)
- Position: Second-row, Lock, Five-eighth
Club
Years	Team	Pld	T	G	FG	P
2013	Wests Tigers	1	0	0	0	0
2015	Lézignan Sangliers	22	6	0	1	25
	Total	23	6	0	1	25

Jarred Farlow (born 17 October 1986) is an Australian former professional rugby league footballer who played in the 2010s for the Wests Tigers in the National Rugby League. He primarily played at second-row and lock, but could also fill in at five-eighth and he previously played for the Lézignan Sangliers in the Elite One Championship. Farlow is currently the head coach of the Ryde-Eastwood Hawks in the Ron Massey Cup Competition which is the 2nd tier New South Wales Rugby League state based competition.

== Background ==
Farlow was born in Baulkham Hills, New South Wales, Australia. Farlow played his junior rugby league for the Leichhardt Wanderers before being signed by the Balmain Ryde-Eastwood Tigers.

== Playing career ==
Farlow started playing for the Balmain Ryde-Eastwood Tigers, a feeder club for Wests Tigers, in the NSW Cup in 2006.

In July 2010, Farlow played for the New South Wales Residents against the Queensland Residents.

In September 2010, Farlow was named captain and at lock in the 2010 NSW Cup Team of the Year. The following year, he joined the Cronulla-Sutherland Sharks mid-season but returned to the Tigers in 2012.

In Round 13 of the 2013 NRL season, Farlow made his NRL debut for the Wests Tigers against the Penrith Panthers.

On 22 September 2013, Farlow was named as the 18th-man reserve in the 2013 NSW Cup Team of the Year. He was also won the Wests Tigers' New South Wales Cup Players' Player award.

On 16 September 2014, Farlow signed a 1-year contract with the Lézignan Sangliers of the Elite One Championship starting in 2015, where he was an inaugural member of the Cathare Knights representative team, selected at lock. In 2015, he was a member of the successful Lézignan Sangliers team that were champions of the Coupe de France Lord Derby He returned to Wests Tigers midway through the 2015 season on a second-tier contract.
