= Manly-Warringah/North Sydney District Rugby League =

Rugby league competition in Northern Sydney, New South Wales, Australia

- Sport: Rugby league
- Number of teams: 20 (17 senior)
- Region: Northern Beaches, North Shore and Hornsby Shire (NSWRL)
- Premiers: Narrabeen Sharks (2022)
- Related competition: Sydney Combined Competition

The Manly-Warringah District Junior Rugby League (MWDJRL) and North Sydney District Junior Rugby League (NSDJRL) is an amateur rugby league competition for senior and junior rugby league clubs in Sydney's Northern Suburbs.

== All District clubs ==
Club	Home Ground	District
Asquith Magpies	Storey Park	North Sydney
Avalon Bulldogs	Hitchcock Park	Pittwater
Beacon Hill Bears	Beacon Hill Oval	Warringah
Belrose Eagles	Lionel Watts Oval	Warringah
Berowra Wallabies	Warrina Oval	North Sydney
Manly Brothers RLFC	Nolans Reserve	Manly
Cromer Kingfishers	St Matthews Farm	Warringah
Forrestville Ferrets	Forestville Park	Warringah
Harbord United Devils	Harbord Park	Warringah
Ku-ring-gai Cubs	Turramurra Memorial Park	North Sydney
Lane Cove Tigers	Tantallon Oval	North Sydney
Manly Cove Rebels	Nolans Reserve	Manly
Mona Vale Raiders	Newport Oval	Pittwater
Narrabeen Sharks	Lake Park	Pittwater
Narraweena Hawks	Beverley Job Park	Warringah
Northwest Hawks RLFC	Dural Park	North Sydney
North Curl Curl Knights	Denzil Joyce Oval	Warringah
North Sydney Brothers RLFC	Tunks Park	North Sydney
Pennant Hills-Cherrybrook Stags	Greenway Park	North Sydney
Willoughby Roos	Willoughby Park	North Sydney

== See also ==
- Balmain District Junior Rugby League
- Cronulla-Sutherland District Rugby Football League
- Parramatta Junior Rugby League
- Penrith District Rugby League
- South Sydney District Junior Rugby Football League
- Sydney Roosters Juniors
- Rugby League Competitions in Australia
