= Kevin Humphreys (rugby league) =

Australian rugby league footballer (1930-2010)

Personal information
- Full name: Kevin Emery Humphreys
- Born: 14 April 1930 Leichhardt, New South Wales, Australia
- Died: 29 April 2010 (aged 80) Drummoyne, New South Wales, Australia

Playing information
- Position: Prop
Club
Years	Team	Pld	T	G	FG	P
1953–56	Balmain Tigers	43	9			27
- Source: As of 5 May 2010
- Relatives: Stephen Humphreys (son); Jamie Humphreys (grandson)

Kevin Emery Humphreys (14 April 1930 – 29 April 2010) was an Australian rugby league footballer and administrator. He was chairman of the New South Wales Rugby League (NSWRL), from about 1973 to 1983. In 1980, he was instrumental in the establishment of the State of Origin series between teams representing New South Wales and Queensland.

== Playing career ==
Born in Leichhardt, Humphreys began playing rugby league with the Leichhardt Wanderers and Balmain CYO in the junior league.

He was recruited to the Balmain Tigers in 1953, playing 43 games for the team over four years until 1956.

== Administration career ==
In 1956, Humphreys became secretary of the Balmain Tigers, holding the position until 1973, when he was appointed President of New South Wales Rugby League (NSWRL), Chairman of Australian Rugby League (ARL), and in 1976 NSWRL Executive Chairman. In 1973 he negotiated rugby league's first television deal with the Australian Broadcasting Corporation.

=== Scandal ===
In 1983, the Australian ABC-TV current affairs programme Four Corners, aired an episode entitled "The Big League". Reporter Chris Masters described allegations of corruption within the NSWRL, including suggestions that officials were siphoning funds from particular clubs and international matches, while players and spectators endured sub-standard facilities. Following the broadcast of the Four Corners program Humphreys resigned as Chairman of the NSWRL and ARL. He was replaced by Tom Bellew in the former position and by Ken Arthurson in the latter.

As a result of the program, a Royal Commission (the Street Royal Commission) was formed whose findings resulted in New South Wales chief magistrate Murray Farquhar being sent to prison, Humphreys' career ending abruptly and ABC being sued for libel by the then NSW State Premier, Neville Wran (who eventually settled out of court). Humphreys also received a $4000 fine and was placed on a "two year good behaviour bond". Humphreys later made a public apology.

== Family ==
Humphreys is survived by his wife Joan and two sons David and Stephen. Stephen was CEO of the Wests Tigers between 2009 and 2012.

== Death ==
Humphreys suffered from strokes for many months and had both legs amputated because of complications. He had suffered strokes which resulted in some paralysis prior to his death on 29 April 2010 at the age of 80 in a hospital in Sydney.

== Obituaries ==
- The Sydney Morning Herald
- NSW Rugby League
- League Unlimited
