= Balmain District Junior Rugby League =

Australian sports league

The Balmain Tigers District Junior Rugby League is one of the oldest Junior Rugby league Competitions in Australia. It administers an affiliation of junior rugby league clubs in the inner west and inner north west of Sydney.

The league caters for age groups from under 6's to under 12's. Senior teams (Under 13's - A Grade) play in the neighbouring Manly-Warringah/North Sydney District Rugby League. The Under 6's to Under 8's is a non-competitive competition. The Under 9's to Under 12's play in a modified competition.

== Clubs ==
As of 2023 there were eleven clubs in the Balmain Tigers Junior Rugby League, with over 120 teams. These clubs are:

- Carlingford Cougars (formerly known as St Gerards Carlingford)
- Concord-Burwood-Glebe Wolves (merger of Burwood Utd & Concord Utd in the 1990s, former Western Suburbs junior clubs, as well as Glebe)
- Dundas Shamrocks Junior Rugby League Football Club (formerly known as St Patricks Dundas)
- Enfield Federals (former Western Suburbs junior club)
- Five Dock Dockers (former Western Suburbs junior club)
- Holy Cross Rhinos (Ryde)
- Leichhardt Juniors
- Leichhardt Wanderers (formed in 1918)
- North Ryde Hawks
- Ryde-Eastwood Hawks
- Strathfield Raiders

== Former clubs ==
Some extinct clubs that once played in the Balmain District junior competition include:

- Balmain Police Boys (until 2014)
- Drummoyne Sports (until the 1990s)
- Balmain Waratahs (until the 1990s)
- Ermington-Rydalmere (until the 1990s)
- Glebe Police Boys (until the 1990s)
- Balmain United (until the 1990s)
- Cricketers Arms (until the 1990s - Darling St, Balmain - now known as Monkey Bar)
- Sackville Sharks
- Ryde District Devils (until the 1980s)
- Birchgrove Scorpions (until the 1990s)
- Gladesville Sports (until the 1980s)
- West Ryde-Denistone Stones (until mid 2000s)
- Rozelle Codocks (until the 1970s)
- Pyrmont Colts (until the 1980s)
- Glebe Shamrocks (a.k.a. St James Sports Club - until the 1970s)
- Ryde CYO (until the 1970s)
- Carlingford CYO (until the 1970s)
- Balmain Arlines (until the 1970s)
- Glebe Youth
- Bing & Swing (Glebe, former Glebe district junior team - folded in 1930)
- Balmain Iona (a.k.a. Rozelle Iona)
- Drummoyne Rovers (1920s)
- Rozelle Fernleigh (1920s)
- Marist College Eastwood

== Notable Juniors ==
Some notable Balmain juniors include:

- Wayne Pearce (Balmain Police Boys)
- Paul Sironen (North Ryde)
- Benny Elias (Holy Cross)
- Dene Halatau (North Ryde, formerly of Wentworthville)
- Robbie Farah (Leichhardt Wanderers, formerly of Enfield Federals)
- Luke Brooks (Holy Cross & Leichhardt Wanderers)
- Mitchell Moses (Holy Cross)
- Aaron Woods (Leichhardt Juniors)
- David Gower (Holy Cross)
- Kane Evans (Leichhardt Wanderers & Balmain PCYC)
- Bronson Harrison (Leichhardt Wanderers & Balmain PCYC)
- Josh Lewis (Leichhardt Wanderers)
- Kurtley Beale (North Ryde)
- Mitchell Pearce (North Ryde)
- Alan Thompson (North Ryde)
- Wayne Wigham (North Ryde)
- Mark O'Neill (North Ryde & Dundas Shamrocks)
- Kevin Hardwick (Ryde District Devils & Ermington-Rydalmere)
- John Davidson (Birchgrove Scorpions & Ermington-Rydalmere)

== Early history ==
Early history 1908 - 6 teams - Balmain Iona, Leichhardt Royals, Birchgrove Juniors, Drummoyne Juniors, Rosebuds, Norwood 1909 - 6 teams - Balmain Iona, Rozelle Jnr Kangaroos, Rozelle Waratah, Iverna, Rozelle Rangers, Drummoyne Jnrs 1910 - a shortage of teams and the introduction of teams north of the harbour resulted in the "Balmain & Northern Districts" JRL for one season. A Grade - Neutral Bay 16, All Blacks 11, Rozelle Waratah 11, Elliott Bros 8, Berrys Bay 2, Crows Nest 2; B Grade - Balmain Iona 18, Berrys Bay 12, Rozelle Rangers 4, Crows Nest 2. 1911 - Given that a large number of Leichhardt teams were included and they were technically part of the Annandale District, for the competition was titled "Balmain-Leichhardt" JRL. A Grade - Balmain Iona 17, Leichhardt Royals 13, Elliott Bros 8, Leichhardt Invincible 0; B Grade - Balmain Iona 27, Leichhardt Royals 23, Leichhardt Oaks 16, Balmain Boomerangs 15, Balmain Mertonville 14, Elliott Bros 13, Leichhardt Presbyterian 4, Leichhardt Surreyville 0 1912 - known as Balmain JRL again. A Grade - 9 teams - Boomerangs, Mertonville, Violets, Iona, Pine Park, Rozelle Federals, Rosebuds, Drummoyne; B Grade - St Itas, Glebe 28, Balmain Arline 19, Ultimo Waratah 17, Mertonville 16, Balmain Royals 11, Rosebud 9, Violets 8, Rozelle Waratah 4.

== See also ==
- Cronulla-Sutherland District Rugby Football League
- Manly-Warringah/North Sydney District Rugby League
- Parramatta Junior Rugby League
- Penrith District Rugby League
- South Sydney District Junior Rugby Football League
- Sydney Roosters Juniors
