= Jack Feneley =

Australian businessman and rugby league administrator

John Albus Feneley (1858–1944) was an Australian businessman and co-founder of Rugby League in Australia.

Jack Feneley was associated with many sporting associations in Sydney during his life. He was a Life Member of the NSWRFL, which he helped to bring into existence in 1907, and was a foundation member of the North Sydney Bears Rugby League Football Club in 1908. In his early days, Jack Feneley was associated with professional running, and later, he was a leading boxing promoter in Sydney. Feneley was also a Life Member and founder of the Sydney Flying Squadron and the Balmain 10 Footers Sailing Club. For many year he was connected with the tug-boat industry and lived at Milsons Point, New South Wales for much of his life.

Jack Feneley lived a long and interesting life. He died on 11 January 1944, in his 87th year.
