= Parramatta Junior Rugby League =

Australian rugby competition

- Sport: Rugby league
- Instituted: 1946
- Inaugural season: 1947
- Number of teams: 22
- Holders: OLQP Bulldogs RLFC (2022)

Parramatta Junior Rugby League formed in 1946, when, as a result of expanding urban sprawl an influx of residents flocked to the immediate Parramatta area in Sydney, this caused a compacted competition to be formed and the Western Districts and Southern Districts competitions were revamped. In its fledgling years the competitions took in teams from far adrift as Liverpool and St Marys and just about every town on the Cumberland plateau.

The Parramatta Junior Rugby League currently consists of 22 clubs in the Saturday competition all age groups and seven clubs in the Sunday Parramatta district Convents RL for under-6s to under-12s only. It is represented by 362 teams and 6,500 players covering a vast area which consists of five local government council areas—Hills Shire, Parramatta City, Blacktown city, Cumberland city and Fairfield city.

== Parramatta Sunday Open Age ==
Parramatta Sunday Open Age
- Sport: Rugby league
- Instituted: 1946
- Inaugural season: 1947
- Number of teams: 6

Club	Moniker	Suburb
Austral City	Bears	Austral, New South Wales
Baulkham Hills	Brumbies	Baulkham Hills, New South Wales
Hurricanes	Hurricanes	Sydney
OLQP	Bulldogs	Sydney, New South Wales
South West	Sharks	Sydney, New South Wales
Winston Hills (2 teams)	Hawks	Winston Hills, New South Wales

== Parramatta Junior Rugby League ==
=== Parramatta Junior Rugby League Clubs ===
Club	Suburb	Ground
All Saints Toongabbie Tigers JRLC	Toongabbie	C.V. Kelly Park
Austral City Bears	Austral	Craik Park
Baulkham Hills Brumbies	Baulkham Hills	Castlewood Reserve
Cabra-Vale Diggers Edensor Park Cobras	Edensor Park	Bosnjak Park
Cabramatta Two Blues	Cabramatta	New Era Stadium
Canley Heights JRLFC	Smithfield	Rosford Street Reserve
Canley Vale JRLFC	Canley Vale	Adams Park
Maulers United	Fairfield	N/A
Greystanes Devils JRLFC	Greystanes	Darling Street Park
Guildford Junior Rugby League	Guilford	Mccredie Park
Hills District JRLFC	Baulkham Hills	Crestwood Oval
Kellyville Bushrangers JRLFC	Kellyville	Kellyville Park
Lalor Park JRLFC	Lalor Park	Cavanagh Reserve
Marconi Mustangs	Bossley Park	Marconi Oval
Merrylands Rams JRLFC	Merrylands	Merrylands Oval
Mounties	Mount Pritchard	Mt Pritchard Sportsground
OLQP Bulldogs RLFC	Greystanes	Roberta Street Park
Parramatta City Titans JRLFC	Parramatta	Ollie Webb Reserve
Parramatta Junior Eels Rugby League	North Parramatta	Richie Benaud Oval
Rouse Hill Rhinos Junior Rugby League	Castle Hill	Wrights Road Reserve
Wentworthville United JRLFC	Wentworthville	Ringrose Park
Winston Hills Junior Rugby League Club	Baulkham Hills	Tory Burn Reserve
Winston Hill Hawks	Winston Hills	John Curtin Reserve

=== Former teams ===
Club	Final season	Reason
Seven Hills JRLFC	2024	Players
North West Hurricanes	2023	Unknown
South West Sharks	2023	Unknown
Fairfield Patrician Brothers JRLFC	2023	Unknown
Blacktown District Rugby League Spartans	2020	Unknown
Maulers United JRLFC	2020	Unknown
Penrith Waratahs	1967	Formed Penrith District junior rugby league
Windsor Wolves	1967	Formed Penrith District junior rugby league
St Mary's Saints	1967	Formed Penrith District junior rugby league

== Opens Grand Finals ==
Season	Premiers	Score	Runners-up	Ground / Crowd
1947	Cabramatta	11–7	Blacktown	
1948				
1949				
1950	Toongabbie			
1951	Wentworthville	10–7	Cabramatta	Merrylands Oval
1952				
1953	Liverpool		Parramatta East	McCredie Park
1954				
1955	Riverstone			
1956				
1957	St Marys	13–7	Parramatta East	Wentworthville
1958	Penrith	16–12	St Marys	
1959	Penrith	19–6	Parramatta City	Merrylands Oval
1960	Merrylands	7–6	Liverpool	
1961	St Marys	23–10	Penrith	
1962	St Marys	14–0	Wentworthville	
1963	St Marys	10–2	Wentworthville	
1964	Richmond	5–0	St Marys	McCredie Park
1965	St Marys			
1966	Cabramatta	12–5	Wentworthville	
1967				
1968				
1969				
1970	Wentworthville	17–12	Villawood	
1971	Hills District			
1972	Cabramatta	22–9 (after extra-time)	Hills District	
1973	Fairfield City Falcons		Cabramatta	
1974	Fairfield City Falcons		Cabramatta	
1975	Cabramatta	9–7	Fairfield City Falcons	
1976				
1977				
1978				
1979	Lalor Park		Wentworthville Magpies	McCredie Park
1980				
1981	Cabramatta	8–7	Wentworthville	
1982	Cabramatta		Ryde	
1983				
1984			Cabramatta	
1985				
1986				
1987				
1988	Lalor Park			
1989				
1990				
1991				
1992				
1993	Parramatta Marist		Cabramatta	
1994	Cabramatta			
1995	Fairfield United			
1996	Fairfield United			
1997	Fairfield United		Lalor Park	
1998	Cabramatta		Fairfield United	McCredie Park
1999	Lalor Park		Cabramatta	Ringrose Park Wentworthville
2000	Lalor Park		Hills District	Merrylands Oval
2001	Hills District	52-10	Lalor Park	Ringrose Park Wentworthville
2002	Cabramatta		Guildford Raiders	Ringrose Park Wentworthville
2003				
2004				
2005				
2006				
2007				
2008				
2009				
2010				
2011				
2012				
2013				
2014	All Saints Toongabbie Tigers			
2015				
2016				
2017				
2018				
2019				
2020	Wentworthville United	22–18	Hills District JRLFC	McCredie Park
2021	Season suspended Minor Premier: South West Sharks			
2022	Baulkham Hills Brumbies	12–6	OLQP Bulldogs RLFC	Ringrose Park
2023	Baulkham Hills Brumbies	12–6	North West Hurricanes	Ringrose Park

Note: no opens were found for 2020.

== See also ==
- Balmain District Junior Rugby League
- Cronulla-Sutherland District Rugby Football League
- Manly-Warringah/North Sydney District Rugby League
- Penrith District Rugby League
- South Sydney District Junior Rugby Football League
- Sydney Roosters Juniors
- List of rugby league competitions in Australia
