= Outback Rugby League =

Rugby championship

- Sport: Rugby league
- Instituted: 1980
- Inaugural season: 2007
- Number of teams: 4
- Country: Australia
- Premiers: Mildura Warriors (2022)
- Most titles: Broken Hill Saints & Wilcannia Boomerangs (9 titles)

The Outback Rugby League Cup is a NSW Rugby League (NSWRL) Group Competition which is based in Broken Hill in the far west of New South Wales and surrounding districts such as Wilcannia and Menindee.

The competition folded in 1998 but was revived in 2007.

== Teams ==
| Team | Moniker | Town | Ground | Premierships |
|---|---|---|---|---|
| Broken Hill | Scorpions | Broken Hill, New South Wales | Lamb Oval & Memorial Oval | 0 (None) |
| Mildura | Warriors | Mildura, Victoria | Mildura | 1 (2026) |
| Menindee | Yabbies | Menindee, New South Wales | Burke & Wills Park | 4 (1993, 2007, 2011, 2012) |
| Wilcannia | Parntu Warriors | Wilcannia, New South Wales | Burke Oval | 3 (2016, 2020, 2021) |

=== Former clubs ===
- Broken Hill Cowboys
- Broken Hill Geebungs
- Broken Hill Saints
- Wilcannia Boomerangs
- Wilcannia Tigers
- Paarka Broncos

== History ==
The Outback Rugby League was formed in 2007 after a long absence of regular A-Grade rugby league from Broken Hill. The last regular rugby league competition in the area was in 1997 as the Group 12 competition which also included clubs from Broken Hill, Menindee & Wilcannia.

The new competition features clubs from the same areas. A new club was formed before the opening season, the Wilcannia Tigers. The inaugural competition saw a total of 266 registered players across all grades, from under-sixes up. Broken Hill is traditionally dominated by Australian Rules Football.

The 2007 Grand final was a close game between Wilcannia Tigers and Menindee Yabbies. The Yabbies eventually won by one point, 36–35, at Lamb Park in Broken Hill in front of 1,000 spectators. Recently, for the 2008 Outback Rugby League Season, CFMEU (the major sponsor of such teams as the Canberra Raiders) has signed on to become the competition's major sponsor from 2008 and beyond. This will be a massive boost for the competition, financially speaking.

== First grade premiership ==
The premiers of the group competition since 1980:

| Season | Grand Final Information | | | Minor Premiers |
| Season | Premiers | Score | Runners-up | Minor Premiers |
|---|---|---|---|---|
| 1980 | Broken Hill Saints |
| 1981 | Broken Hill Saints |
| 1982 | Broken Hill Saints | | Menindee Yabbies |
| 1983 | Broken Hill Saints | 22–12 | Menindee Yabbies |
| 1984 | Broken Hill United | 19–0 | Broken Hill Saints |
| 1985 | Broken Hill United | 21–20 | Wilcannia Tigers |
| 1986 | Wilcannia Boomerangs | | Broken Hill United |
| 1987 | Broken Hill United | 15–12 | Wilcannia Boomerangs |
| 1988 | Broken Hill United | 31–20 | Wilcannia Boomerangs |
| 1989 | Broken Hill Saints | | Broken Hill United |
| 1990 | Broken Hill Saints | 18–0 | Broken Hill United |
| 1991 | Wilcannia | 34–20 | Menindee Yabbies |
| 1992 |
| 1993 | Menindee Yabbies | 36–20 | Wilcannia |
| 1994 | Broken Hill United | 46–18 | Wilcannia Boomerangs |
| 1995 | Broken Hill United | 28–20 | Wilcannia Boomerangs |
| 1996 | Wilcannia Boomerangs | 38–34 | Broken Hill Geebungs |
| 1997 | Wilcannia Boomerangs | 56–48 | Menindee Yabbies |
1998–2006 – No competition
| 2007 | Menindee Yabbies | 36–35 | Wilcannia Tigers |
| 2008 | Broken Hill Saints | | Wilcannia Boomerangs |
| 2009 | Wilcannia Boomerangs | | Broken Hill Geebungs |
| 2010 | Wilcannia Boomerangs | | Broken Hill Geebungs |
| 2011 | Menindee Yabbies | | Broken Hill Geebungs |
| 2012 | Menindee Yabbies | 36–32 OT | Wilcannia Boomerangs |
| 2013 | Broken Hill Saints | 44–20 | Wilcannia Boomerangs |
| 2014 | Wilcannia Boomerangs | 34–18 | Broken Hill Geebungs |
| 2015 | Wilcannia Boomerangs | 34–22 | Menindee Yabbies |
| 2016 | Parntu Warriors | 28–14 | Wilcannia Boomerangs |
| 2017 | Broken Hill Saints | 24–22 | Wilcannia Boomerangs |
| 2018 | Wilcannia Boomerangs | 24–22 | Menindee Yabbies |
2019 Season Unknown
| 2020 | Parntu Warriors | 40–18 | Menindee Yabbies |
| 2021 | Parntu Warriors | 40–18 | Wilcannia Boomerangs |
2022 Season Cancelled
| 2023 | Wilcannia Boomerangs | 23–22 OT | Menindee Yabbies | Wilcannia Boomerangs |
2024 & 2025 Seasons Cancelled
| 2026 | Mildura | 38–8 | Parntu Warriors | Mildura |

== See also ==
- Rugby League Competitions in Australia
