= New South Wales Rugby League =

Rugby league competition operator in Australia

New South Wales Rugby League Ltd (NSWRL)
- Sport: Rugby league
- Instituted: 1907; 119 years ago
- Replaced by: New South Wales Rugby Football League
- Chair: Dave Trodden
- Number of teams: 413 senior clubs (across 33 leagues)
- Website: nswrl.com.au

The New South Wales Rugby League Ltd (NSWRL) is an Australian rugby league football competition operator in New South Wales and the Australian Capital Territory and is a member of the Australian Rugby League Commission.

It was registered on 21 December 1983 and succeeded the New South Wales Rugby Football League which had been formed in Sydney on 8 August 1907. The NSWRFL and then NSWRL operated the premier rugby league club competitions for Sydney, then New South Wales and then Australia from 1908 to 1994. The organisation administers the New South Wales rugby league team for State of Origin.

== New South Wales Rugby League clubs ==
=== Current New South Wales members ===
Of all of the club in New South Wales, some are some who field teams in the NRL, New South Wales Cup and New South Wales Jersey Flegg Cup, and there are some who no longer field teams in the NRL, but continue to field teams in the New South Wales Cup and New South Wales Jersey Flegg Cup.

The following clubs are the direct full member clubs of the NSWRL.

Colours	Sydney rugby league club	First season	Final season	Current league(s)
	Balmain Tigers	1908 season	1999 season Merger with Wests Magpies	U17s
	Canberra Raiders	1982 season	Currently playing in the NRL	NRL, NSWRL, U21s, U19s, U17s
	Canterbury Bulldogs	1935 season	Currently playing in the NRL	NRL, NSWRL, U21s, U19s, U17s
	Cronulla Sharks	1967 season	Currently playing in the NRL	NRL, U21s, U19s, U17s
	Eastern Suburbs Roosters/ Sydney City Roosters/Sydney Roosters^	1908 season	Currently playing in the NRL	NRL, NSWRL, U21s, U19s, U17s
	Illawarra Steelers	1982 season	1998 season Merger with St. George Dragons	U19s, U17s
	Manly Sea Eagles	1947 season	Currently playing in the NRL*	NRL, NSWRL, U21s, U19s, U17s
	Newcastle Knights	1988 season	Currently playing in the NRL	NRL, NSWRL, U21s, U19s, U17s
	Newtown Jets	1908 season	1983 season	NSWRL
	North Sydney Bears	1908 season	1999 season*	NSWRL, U21s, U19s, U17s
	Parramatta Eels	1947 season	Currently playing in the NRL	NRL, NSWRL, U21s, U19s, U17s
	Penrith Panthers	1967 season	Currently playing in the NRL	NRL, NSWRL, U21s, U19s, U17s
	St. George Dragons	1921 season	1998 season Merger with Illawarra Steelers	NRL, NSWRL, U21s, U19s, U17s
	South Sydney Rabbitohs	1908 season	Currently playing in the NRL+	NRL, NSWRL, U21s, U19s, U17s
	Western Suburbs Magpies	1908 season	1999 NRL season Merger with Balmain Tigers	NSWRL, U19s, U17s

- * Balmain Tigers and Western Suburbs Magpies merged after 1999 season to form the Wests Tigers.
- * Illawarra Steelers and St George Dragons merged after 1999 season to form the St George Illawarra Dragons.
- * Manly Warringah Sea Eagles and North Sydney Bears merged after 1999 season to form the Northern Eagles which demerged after the 2002 season. Manly Warringah returned at the start of the 2003 NRL season.
- + South Sydney Rabbitohs were evicted from the competition after the 1999 season but, following a successful court battle, returned for the start of the 2002 season.
- ^ Sydney Roosters were initially called Eastern Suburbs Roosters from the 1908 season until the 1994 season, then called Sydney City Roosters from the 1995 season until the 1999 season.

== History ==
Rugby league was first played in New South Wales in 1907. The New South Wales Rugby Football League (NSWRFL) was formed in August 1907, when player discontent with the administration of the New South Wales Rugby Union, over rejection of compensation payments for injuries and lost wages, led to a breakaway movement. Key figures in the new league were James Joseph Giltinan, legendary cricketer Victor Trumper, Alex Burdon, Peter Moir, Labor politician Henry Hoyle, George Brackenreg and Jack Feneley. The first NSWRFL game was played on 17 August 1907, in which a New Zealand team defeated a NSW team 12–8.

The Sydney premiership was started on 20 April 1908. Nine teams contested the initial season. These were the nine teams:

- Balmain Tigers
- (Central) Cumberland Fruitpickers
- Eastern Suburbs Roosters
- Glebe Dirty Reds
- Newcastle Rebels
- Newtown Jets
- North Sydney Bears
- Western Suburbs Magpies
- South Sydney Rabbitohs

The NSWRFL premiership was continued on the basis of the first competition in 1908. In 1929, Jersey Flegg was appointed to the position of president of the NSWRFL and in 1941 he became chairman of the Australian Rugby League Board of Control. At the time of his death in 1960, aged 82, he was still serving in these roles.

When NSWRFL president Flegg died in 1960, Bill Buckley replaced him and also became boss of the Australian Rugby League, a position he remained in from 1960 until his death in 1973. In 1973, Kevin Humphreys was appointed President of NSWRFL and Chairman of Australian Rugby League (ARL). Under him State of Origin was introduced.

In 1983, Humphreys was succeeded in these positions by Ken Arthurson. Under Arthurson, the NSWRFL was succeeded by the New South Wales Rugby League Ltd (NSWRL) and the clubs in the league expanded outside the borders of the state and even the country until, in 1994, after the 87th consecutive premiership season, the Australian Rugby League (ARL) replaced the NSWRL in the operation of the premier competition.

Notwithstanding the handover of control of the game at the elite level across Australia to the ARL, NSWRL retained responsibility for both the administration of the New South Wales rugby league team in State of Origin series, as well as day-to-day management of the state-based New South Wales Cup second-tier premiership, as well as junior representative competitions and divisional leagues throughout NSW and the ACT. It did so in conjunction with the NSW Country Rugby League before their merger in 2019. In a similar way, the rival Queensland Rugby League retained responsibility for that state's Origin team and lower tier competitions.

=== Royal Agricultural Society Shield ===
The Royal Agricultural Society Shield, or RAS Shield was the New South Wales Rugby League (NSWRL)'s first premiership trophy. It was presented to each year's premiership winning rugby league team; the first to win three successive titles would take permanent ownership of the shield. The Eastern Suburbs club achieved this feat winning premierships in 1911, 1912 and 1913.

The hand crafted silver and oak designed shield was donated to the NSWRL by the Royal Agricultural Society of New South Wales in its first year of competition.

Leading journalist Claude Corbett wrote in Sydney, Sun, newspaper on, 1 May 1914, "The Royal Agricultural Society Shield, which was presented at the inception of the League's first grade competition has been won outright by Eastern Suburbs, who upset all calculations by winning the premiership three years in succession. The club has presented the shield to their captain, Dally Messenger, 'as a token of appreciation of his captaincy'."

In 1929, Jersey Flegg was appointed to the position of president of the NSWRFL.

Midway through the 1909 season, Edward Larkin was appointed full-time secretary of the NSWRFL.

=== J.J. Giltinan Shield ===
In 1951, the NSWRFL originated the J.J. Giltinan Shield, following his death in 1950. This trophy was awarded to the premiers of the NSWRFL competition, being named after one of the founding fathers of the NSWRFL and rugby league in Australia. The trophy remains today, being awarded to the minor premiers of the National Rugby League competition.

Following Jersey Flegg's death in 1960, Bill Buckley was made the NSWRFL's new president.

In 1967, the NSWRFL grand final became the first football grand final of any code to be televised live in Australia. The Nine Network had paid $5,000 for the broadcasting rights.

In 1973, NSWRFL boss Kevin Humphreys negotiated rugby league's first television deal with the Australian Broadcasting Corporation. The NSWRFL had commenced a very popular and successful mid-week competition in 1974, originally known as the Amco Cup, but later as the Tooth Cup and the National Panasonic Cup. The success of this competition, which included teams from both Brisbane and New Zealand, ultimately created pressure for further expansion in the NSWRFL competition.

In 1980, the NSWRFL President Kevin Humphreys, who had been chairman of the League since 1973, was instrumental in the establishment of the State of Origin series between teams representing the NSWRFL and Queensland Rugby League (QRL). The immediate success of this series, which remains the premier representative competition in Australia, and the overriding success of the Queensland team further pressured the NSWRFL to expand the club competition outside the boundaries of the state.

Sydney suburban teams came and went throughout the NSWRFL's history but it was not until 1982 that the competition included expansion outside of the Sydney area. This corresponded with the adoption of commercial sponsorship of the competition for the first time, the Winfield Cup. The two new inclusions were from the Australian Capital Territory – the Canberra Raiders – as well as a team from the southern New South Wales region – the Illawarra Steelers.

=== Winfield Cup ===
The Winfield Cup trophy remains a permanent symbol of one of the game's most successful eras. Cast in bronze by Alan Ingham, it was the game's ultimate prize for the duration of the Winfield sponsorship from 1982 to 1995.

Based on John O'Gready's world famous photograph of Norm Provan (St George) and Arthur Summons (Wests) after the 1963 Grand Final, the trophy represented the premiership pinnacle for players in the Winfield Era.

The Winfield Cup captured these and many other things about League in its primary image, "The Gladiators" and the famous trophy, like the J.J. Giltinan Shield, remains an part of the game's heritage.

The League's name was changed in 1984 to the New South Wales Rugby League and Ken Arthurson became the new chairman. In 1988, two Queensland teams joined the competition, with the inclusions of the Brisbane Broncos and the Gold Coast-Tweed Giants seeing the game move beyond the outer borders of New South Wales. At the same time, a team from the Hunter region of New South Wales was included, with the return of a franchise for Newcastle. Their return was the end of an 81-year wait in the wilderness and this time around the franchise was badged the Newcastle Knights.

In 1990, the NSWRL introduced a salary cap system to even the playing field of teams in the Winfield Cup.

The Winfield Cup competition was handed over to the control of the Australian Rugby League for the 1995 season, with the inclusion of teams from North Queensland, South Queensland, Western Australia and New Zealand. This period of expansion created tremendous success for the competition and rugby league in general.

=== The Knock On Effect NSW Cup ===
The Knock On Effect NSW Cup (formerly known as NSW Cup, VB NSW Cup, Intrust Super Premiership and Canterbury Cup NSW) is the States's top-tier competition and clubs run as direct feeders to NRL sides. Canterbury of New Zealand had naming rights from Season 2019 to Season 2020.

=== Country Rugby League ===
On 24 August 2018, the NSWRL and CRL entered into a memorandum of understanding (MOU) in relation to a possible merger. In October 2019 CRL merged with NSWRL after NSWRL agreed a new constitution and the CRL voted to wind up its affairs immediately.

== National Rugby League clubs ==
New South Wales is home to the following National Rugby League teams:

Club	Location	Home ground(s) & capacity	First season
Canterbury Bulldogs	Sydney (Belmore)	Stadium Australia (82,500), Belmore Sports Ground (19,000)	1935
Cronulla Sharks	Sydney (Cronulla)	Endeavour Field (20,000)	1967
Manly Sea Eagles	Sydney (Brookvale)	Brookvale Oval (23,000)	1947
Newcastle Knights	Newcastle (New Lambton)	Newcastle ISC (33,000)	1988
Parramatta Eels	Sydney (Parramatta)	Western Sydney Stadium (30,000)	1947
Penrith Panthers	Sydney (Penrith)	Penrith Stadium (22,000)	1967
South Sydney Rabbitohs	Sydney (Redfern)	Stadium Australia (82,500)	1908
St. George Illawarra Dragons*	Sydney (Carlton), Wollongong	Jubilee Oval (20,500), Wollongong Showground (20,000)	1999
Sydney Roosters	Sydney (Moore Park)	Sydney Football Stadium (42,500)	1908
Wests Tigers*	Sydney, (Campbelltown), Sydney, (Lilyfield), Sydney, (Parramatta)	Western Sydney Stadium (30,000), Leichhardt Oval (20,000), Campbelltown Stadium (18,000),	2000

- St. George Dragons joined in 1921; Illawarra Steelers joined in 1982. They merged in 1999 to form St. George Illawarra Dragons
- Balmain Tigers and Western Suburbs Magpies joined in 1908. They merged in 2000 to form Wests Tigers.

== Current senior competitions ==
=== Statewide/representative ===
==== Open age ====
- Knock on effect NSW Cup
- NSW Women's Premiership
- Presidents Cup
- NSW Challenge Cup

==== Age-based ====
- Jersey Flegg Cup (U21s)
- S.G. Ball Cup (U19s)
- Laurie Daley Cup (U18s)
- Tarsha Gale Cup (Women's U19s)
- Harold Matthews Cup (U17s)
- Andrew Johns Cup (U16s)
- Lisa Fiaola Cup (Women's U17s)

=== Metropolitan ===
- Ron Massey Cup
- Sydney Shield
- Macarthur Division Rugby League
- NSWRL Conference Competitions
  - Metro Open Age Gold (Manly/Norths/Balmain/Canterbury/Parramatta)
  - Central Northern Open Age (Manly/Norths/Balmain)
  - Central West Open Age (Canterbury/Parramatta)
  - Southern Open Age (Cronulla/St George)
- Penrith District Rugby League
- South Sydney A Grade

=== Country ===
==== Region 1 – North Coast Bulldogs/Northern Rivers Titans ====
- Northern Rivers Division (Group 1 and 18's Merger)*
- Group 2 (Northern Mid North Coast)*
- Group 3 (Southern Mid North Coast)*
- Hastings League (Mid North Coast Division 2)

==== Region 2 – Greater Northern Tigers ====
- Group 4 (Western New England)*
- Group 19 (New England)*
- Group 21 (Hunter)*

==== Region 3 – Bidgee Bulls/Monaro Colts (Riverina & Monaro) ====
- Canberra Division (Formerly Group 8)*
- Group 9 (Wagga Wagga and Districts)*
- Group 16 (Far South Coast)*
- Group 17 (Western Riverina Community Cup)
- Group 20 (Griffith and Districts)*
- George Tooke Shield (Canberra District Division 2)

==== Region 4 – Western Rams ====
- Peter McDonald Premiership (Groups 10 & 11 First Grade)*
  - Group 10 (Central West)
  - Group 11 (Dubbo and Districts)
- Group 12 (Outback RL)
- Group 14 (Castlereagh Cup)
- Group 15 (Barwon Darling RL)
- Woodbridge Cup (Central West Division 2)
- Mid West Cup (Central West Division 3)

==== Region 5 – Greater Southern (Illawarra-South Coast Dragons) ====
- Illawarra Division*
- Group 7 (South Coast & Southern Highlands)*

==== Region 6 – NMR Knights/Central Coast Roosters (Newcastle & Central Coast) ====
- Central Coast Division*
- Newcastle Division*
- Newcastle & Hunter Rugby League

* = Top-level country leagues; premiers eligible for Clayton Cup as best regional team in the state.

== Representative ==
The NSWRL manages the New South Wales State of Origin team as well the NSW Residents, Jim Beam Cup, under-19s, under-17s and under-16s and Indigenous rugby league teams. These teams traditionally play against teams from the Queensland Rugby League.

City vs Country is an annual match that takes place between a City side selected by the NSWRL and a Country side selected by New South Wales Country Rugby League. It is played before the State of Origin series and is often referred to as a selection trial for the New South Wales Blues team.

The annual State of Origin series between the New South Wales Blues and the Queensland Maroons is the most popular sporting event in NSW. Sydney has hosted many State of Origin matches since the series began in 1980. The three-game series are held in Sydney and Brisbane with the first and third games in one city and the second in the other. These rotate every year, so if two games are played in Sydney one year, then those games are played in Brisbane the next.

== Other activities ==
The NSWRL conducts a development academy from the NSW Institute of Sport facility at Narrabeen. This facility is actively involved in the conduct of competitions and carnivals involving junior league and schools based teams. The academy also conducts several camps, focusing on development as well as running the accreditation process for coaches, trainers, first aid and match officials.

Radio coverage is presented by Steele Sports who call two games of the Intrust Super Premiership each weekend. Steele Sports includes a large team from across Sydney: Alby Talarico (founder), Curtis Woodward (lead caller), Daniel Pettigrew (lead caller), Jack Clifton, Keith 'The chairman' Payne, Tony Dosen, Lewis Shepperd, Luke Potter and Matt French.

Hawkesbury Radio call Penrith Panthers matches while Alive FM call selected Wentworthville games. Each year, they host the Tom Brock Lecture in their headquarters.

== See also ==
- New South Wales Rugby League premiership
- Queensland Rugby League
- Super League (Australia)
- Touch Football Australia
