= Queanbeyan Blues =

Australian rugby league club, based in Queanbeyan, NSW

Queanbeyan United Blues
Club information
- Full name: Queanbeyan Blues United Rugby League Football Club
- Nickname: Blues
- Colours: Sky blue White
- Founded: 1920; 106 years ago
- Website: Official website

Current details
- Ground: Seiffert Oval
- Coach: Jeremy Braun
- Captain: Dylan McLachlan
- Competition: Canberra Raiders Cup
- 2021 Season: 6th
- Home colours

Records
- Premierships: 26 (1932, 1936, 1937, 1938, 1951, 1965, 1966, 1967, 1974, 1975, 1978, 1979, 1980, 1981, 1987, 1992, 1994, 2000, 2002, 2003, 2005, 2008, 2014, 2015, 2017, 2019)
- Runners-up: 23 (1947, 1948, 1949, 1953, 1957, 1964, 1968, 1969, 1970, 1971, 1973, 1976, 1977, 1983, 1993, 1995, 1998, 1999, 2001, 2004, 2006, 2011, 2013)
- Reserve Grade Premierships: 22 (1948, 1964, 1966, 1967, 1968, 1970, 1972, 1974, 1976, 1977, 1979, 1980, 1986, 1987, 1991, 2000, 2001, 2003, 2004, 2012, 2014, 2016)
- Second Division Premierships: 1 (1936)
- Under 18/19s Premierships: 11 (1958, 1972, 1974, 1977, 1978, 1996, 2000, 2005, 2007, 2018, 2019)
- Open Women's Premierships: 1 (2017)

Queanbeyan Blues United Rugby League Club is an Australian rugby league football club based in Queanbeyan, New South Wales formed in the late 1920s. They conduct teams for both junior and senior teams.

== Notable Juniors ==
- Johnny Hawke (1949-52 St George Dragons)
- Carl Frommel (1982 Canberra Raiders)
- Jon Hardy (1982-85 Canberra Raiders)
- Glenn Lazarus (1989-99 Canberra Raiders, Brisbane Broncos & Melbourne Storm)
- Ricky Stuart (1988-00 Canberra Raiders & Canterbury Bulldogs)
- Matt Giteau (2001-22 ACT Brumbies, Western Force & RC Toulonnais)
- Brent Kite (2002-15 St George Illawarra Dragons, Manly Sea Eagles & Penrith Panthers)
- Trevor Thurling (2004-12 Canberra Raiders & Canterbury Bulldogs)
- Terry Campese (2004-16 Canberra Raiders & Hull Kingston Rovers)
- Cameron King (2010-19 St George Illawarra Dragons, North Queensland Cowboys & Parramatta Eels)
