= Carl Frommel =

Australian rugby league footballer

Personal information
- Born: Canberra, ACT, Australia

Playing information
- Position: Lock
Club
Years	Team	Pld	T	G	FG	P
1982	Canberra Raiders	25	0	0	0	0

Carl Frommel is an Australian former professional rugby league footballer who played for the Canberra Raiders in the New South Wales Rugby Football League (NSWRFL).

== Biography ==
Born in Canberra, Frommel has a background in rugby union, but played rugby league with the Queanbeyan Blues for several seasons before joining the Raiders in his late 20s. He was a regarded as a fitness fanatic and had a high tackle rate.

Frommel was Canberra's lock in the club's first ever premiership season in 1982, where he featured in a total of 25 first-grade games. He missed only one round for Canberra that season, which made him the second most capped player of 1982 behind Jon Hardy.
