= 2021 Canberra Rugby League =

2021 Canberra Raiders Cup
- Duration: 10 April – 19 September 2021
- Teams: 9
- Broadcast partners: Bar TV Sports

== Canberra Raiders Cup (First Grade) ==
The 2021 Canberra Raiders Cup was the 23rd season of the cup, the top division rugby league club competition in Canberra. The 2021 Canberra Raiders Cup consisted of 18 regular season rounds that began on 10 April and ended on 28 August. There were three playoff rounds, beginning on 4 September with the first semi-final, and ending on 19 September with the grand final. Canberra Raiders U20s were the defending premiers.

On 31 August, the Canberra Region Rugby League announced the cancellation of the remainder of the 2021 season due to the COVID-19 pandemic.

=== Teams ===
Nine teams played in 2021: five teams from Canberra, two from Queanbeyan, one from Yass, and one from Goulburn.

Colours	Club	Season	Home ground(s)	Head coach
	Belconnen United Sharks	5th season	NSWRL HQ Bruce	Scott Logan
	Goulburn City Bulldogs	1st season	Workers Arena	Tyson Greenwood, Jesse Martin
	Gungahlin Bulls	28th season	Gungahlin Enclosed Oval	Neil Bijorac
	Queanbeyan Kangaroos	52nd season	Seears Workwear Oval	Adam Taylor
	Queanbeyan United Blues	82nd season	Seiffert Oval	Terry Campese, Ronnie Hoare
	Tuggeranong Bushrangers	18th season	Greenway Oval	Jarrad Teka
	West Belconnen Warriors	46th season	Raiders Belconnen	Matt Gafa
	Woden Valley Rams	51st season	Phillip Oval	Ken Nagas
	Yass Magpies	68th season	Walker Park	Cameron Hardy

=== Ladder ===
Pos	Team	Pld	W	D	L	PF	PA	PD	Pts
1	Gungahlin Bulls	13	11	1	1	424	338	+86	25
2	Queanbeyan United Blues	13	11	0	2	504	234	+270	24
3	Queanbeyan Kangaroos	12	7	0	5	374	294	+80	18
4	West Belconnen Warriors	12	6	1	5	270	282	−12	17
5	Goulburn City Bulldogs	13	5	2	6	336	368	−32	14
6	Belconnen United Sharks	12	4	0	8	284	334	−50	12
7	Yass Magpies	12	3	1	8	304	390	−86	11
8	Tuggeranong Bushrangers	13	4	0	9	304	390	−86	10
9	Woden Valley Rams	12	2	1	9	230	400	−170	9

Updated to match(es) played on 8 August. Source:
Rules for classification: 1) points; 2) point difference; 3) points scored

==== Ladder progression ====
- Numbers highlighted in green indicate that the team finished the round inside the top 4.
- Numbers highlighted in blue indicate that the team finished first on the ladder in that round.
- Numbers highlighted in red indicate that the team finished last place on the ladder in that round.
- Underlined numbers indicate that the team had a bye during that round.

Pos	Team	1	2	3	4	5	6	7	8	9	10	11	12	13	14	15	16	17	18
1	Gungahlin Bulls	2	4	6	8	10	12	14	14	16	18	20	21	21	23	25	25	25	25
2	Queanbeyan United Blues	2	4	6	8	10	10	10	12	14	16	18	20	20	22	24	24	24	24
3	Queanbeyan Kangaroos	0	0	2	4	4	4	6	8	10	12	14	14	14	16	18	18	18	18
4	West Belconnen Warriors	0	2	2	4	5	7	9	9	11	13	13	15	15	15	17	17	17	17
5	Goulburn City Bulldogs	2	4	4	6	6	6	8	10	12	12	13	14	14	14	14	14	14	14
6	Belconnen United Sharks	0	0	2	2	2	4	6	8	8	8	10	10	10	12	12	12	12	12
7	Yass Magpies	2	2	4	4	5	7	7	7	7	9	9	9	9	11	11	11	11	11
8	Tuggeranong Bushrangers	2	2	2	2	4	6	6	8	8	8	8	10	10	10	10	10	10	10
9	Woden Valley Rams	0	2	2	2	4	4	4	4	4	4	5	7	7	7	9	9	9	9

=== Season results ===
==== Round 1 ====
Home	Score	Away	Match information
Home	Score	Away	Date and time	Venue	Referee
Tuggeranong Bushrangers	36 – 12	Queanbeyan Kangaroos	Saturday, 10 April, 3:00pm	Greenway Oval	James Charman
Queanbeyan United Blues	52 – 12	Belconnen United Sharks	Saturday, 10 April, 3:00pm	Seiffert Oval	Luke Barrow
Gungahlin Bulls	32 – 22	Woden Valley Rams	Saturday, 10 April, 3:00pm	Gungahlin Enclosed Oval	Houshyar Fallah
Goulburn City Bulldogs	28 – 20	West Belconnen Warriors	Sunday, 11 April, 3:00pm	Workers Arena	Fatu Aiono-Fatu
Yass Magpies		Bye

==== Round 2 ====
Home	Score	Away	Match information
Home	Score	Away	Date and time	Venue	Referee
Woden Valley Rams	26 – 22	Tuggeranong Bushrangers	Saturday, 17 April, 3:00pm	Phillip Oval	James Charman
Queanbeyan United Blues	40 – 6	Yass Magpies	Saturday, 17 April, 3:00pm	Seiffert Oval	Luke Barrow
Belconnen United Sharks	22 – 40	Gungahlin Bulls	Saturday, 17 April, 3:00pm	NSWRL HQ Bruce	Fatu Aiono-Fatu
Goulburn City Bulldogs	44 – 30	Queanbeyan Kangaroos	Sunday, 18 April, 3:00pm	Workers Arena	Houshyar Fallah
West Belconnen Warriors		Bye

==== Round 3 ====
Home	Score	Away	Match information
Home	Score	Away	Date and time	Venue	Referee
Yass Magpies	42 – 40	Tuggeranong Bushrangers	Saturday, 24 April, 3:00pm	Walker Park	Fatu Aiono-Fatu
Woden Valley Rams	12 – 26	Queanbeyan Kangaroos	Saturday, 24 April, 3:00pm	Phillip Oval	Luke Barrow
Queanbeyan United Blues	38 – 20	Goulburn City Bulldogs	Saturday, 24 April, 3:00pm	Seiffert Oval	Evan Bayliss
Gungahlin Bulls	32 – 30	West Belconnen Warriors	Saturday, 24 April, 3:00pm	Gungahlin Enclosed Oval	Houshyar Fallah
Belconnen United Sharks		Bye

==== Round 4 ====
Home	Score	Away	Match information
Home	Score	Away	Date and time	Venue	Referee
West Belconnen Warriors	30 – 12	Woden Valley Rams	Saturday, 1 May, 1:45pm	Raiders Belconnen	Andrew Wheeler
Tuggeranong Bushrangers	6 – 60	Queanbeyan United Blues	Saturday, 1 May, 3:00pm	Greenway Oval	Evan Bayliss
Queanbeyan Kangaroos	24 – 18	Belconnen United Sharks	Saturday, 1 May, 3:00pm	Seears Workwear Oval	James Charman
Gungahlin Bulls	36 – 34	Yass Magpies	Saturday, 1 May, 3:00pm	Gungahlin Enclosed Oval	Houshyar Fallah
Goulburn City Bulldogs		Bye

==== Round 5 ====
Home	Score	Away	Match information
Home	Score	Away	Date and time	Venue	Referee
Yass Magpies	30 – 30	West Belconnen Warriors	Saturday, 8 May, 3:00pm	Walker Park	Houshyar Fallah
Queanbeyan United Blues	24 – 22	Queanbeyan Kangaroos	Saturday, 8 May, 3:00pm	Seiffert Oval	Evan Bayliss
Belconnen United Sharks	24 – 30	Tuggeranong Bushrangers	Saturday, 8 May, 3:00pm	NSWRL HQ Bruce	Andrew Wheeler
Goulburn City Bulldogs	34 – 38	Gungahlin Bulls	Sunday, 9 May, 3:00pm	Workers Arena	Jason McManus
Woden Valley Rams		Bye

==== Round 6 ====
Home	Score	Away	Match information
Home	Score	Away	Date and time	Venue	Referee
Yass Magpies	38 – 10	Woden Valley Rams	Saturday, 22 May, 3:00pm	Walker Park	Houshyar Fallah
Queanbeyan Kangaroos	28 – 30	West Belconnen Warriors	Saturday, 22 May, 3:00pm	Seears Workwear Oval	Jason McManus
Belconnen United Sharks	22 – 16	Goulburn City Bulldogs	Saturday, 22 May, 3:00pm	NSWRL HQ Bruce	James Charman
Gungahlin Bulls	40 – 20	Queanbeyan United Blues	Saturday, 22 May, 3:20pm	Gungahlin Enclosed Oval	Evan Bayliss
Tuggeranong Bushrangers		Bye

==== Round 7 ====
Home	Score	Away	Match information
Home	Score	Away	Date and time	Venue	Referee
Woden Valley Rams	20 – 36	Goulburn City Bulldogs	Saturday, 29 May, 3:00pm	Phillip Oval	Evan Bayliss
West Belconnen Warriors	22 – 18	Queanbeyan United Blues	Saturday, 29 May, 3:00pm	Raiders Belconnen	Houshyar Fallah
Tuggeranong Bushrangers	20 – 36	Gungahlin Bulls	Saturday, 29 May, 3:00pm	Greenway Oval	James Charman
Belconnen United Sharks	30 – 24	Yass Magpies	Saturday, 29 May, 3:00pm	NSWRL HQ Bruce	Jason McManus
Queanbeyan Kangaroos		Bye

==== Round 8 ====
Home	Score	Away	Match information
Home	Score	Away	Date and time	Venue	Referee
Yass Magpies	18 – 34	Goulburn City Bulldogs	Saturday, 5 June, 3:00pm	Walker Park	Houshyar Fallah
Gungahlin Bulls	14 – 60	Queanbeyan Kangaroos	Saturday, 5 June, 3:00pm	Gungahlin Enclosed Oval	Evan Bayliss
Belconnen United Sharks	34 – 12	Woden Valley Rams	Saturday, 5 June, 3:00pm	NSWRL HQ Bruce	Braiden McIntosh
West Belconnen Warriors	22 – 24	Tuggeranong Bushrangers	Sunday, 6 June, 3:00pm	Raiders Belconnen	Tristan Brooker
Queanbeyan United Blues		Bye

==== Round 9 ====
Home	Score	Away	Match information
Home	Score	Away	Date and time	Venue	Referee
Woden Valley Rams	22 – 34	Queanbeyan United Blues	Saturday, 19 June, 3:00pm	Phillip Oval	Braiden McIntosh
Queanbeyan Kangaroos	46 – 16	Yass Magpies	Saturday, 19 June, 3:00pm	Seears Workwear Oval	Evan Bayliss
West Belconnen Warriors	24 – 18	Belconnen United Sharks	Sunday, 20 June, 3:00pm	Raiders Belconnen	Houshyar Fallah
Goulburn City Bulldogs	32 – 22	Tuggeranong Bushrangers	Sunday, 20 June, 3:00pm	Workers Arena	David Charman
Gungahlin Bulls		Bye

==== Round 10 ====
Home	Score	Away	Match information
Home	Score	Away	Date and time	Venue	Referee
Woden Valley Rams	18 – 46	Gungahlin Bulls	Saturday, 3 July, 2:00pm	Phillip Oval	Jason McManus
West Belconnen Warriors	18 – 10	Goulburn City Bulldogs	Saturday, 3 July, 3:00pm	Raiders Belconnen	Braiden McIntosh
Queanbeyan Kangaroos	20 – 14	Tuggeranong Bushrangers	Saturday, 3 July, 3:00pm	Seears Workwear Oval	Houshyar Fallah
Belconnen United Sharks	24 – 30	Queanbeyan United Blues	Saturday, 3 July, 3:00pm	NSWRL HQ Bruce	David Charman
Yass Magpies		Bye

==== Round 11 ====
Home	Score	Away	Match information
Home	Score	Away	Date and time	Venue	Referee
Yass Magpies	22 – 42	Belconnen United Sharks	Saturday, 10 July, 3:00pm	Walker Park	Houshyar Fallah
Queanbeyan United Blues	42 – 10	West Belconnen Warriors	Saturday, 10 July, 3:00pm	Seiffert Oval	Evan Bayliss
Gungahlin Bulls	36 – 26	Tuggeranong Bushrangers	Saturday, 10 July, 3:00pm	Gungahlin Enclosed Oval	Braiden McIntosh
Goulburn City Bulldogs	28 – 28	Woden Valley Rams	Saturday, 10 July, 3:00pm	Workers Arena	Fatu Aiono-Fatu
Queanbeyan Kangaroos		Bye

==== Round 12 ====
Home	Score	Away	Match information
Home	Score	Away	Date and time	Venue	Referee
Tuggeranong Bushrangers	32 – 22	Belconnen United Sharks	Saturday, 17 July, 2:00pm	Greenway Oval	David Charman
Queanbeyan Kangaroos	12 – 44	Queanbeyan United Blues	Saturday, 17 July, 3:00pm	Seears Workwear Oval	Braiden McIntosh
Gungahlin Bulls	22 – 22	Goulburn City Bulldogs	Saturday, 17 July, 3:00pm	Gungahlin Enclosed Oval	Evan Bayliss
West Belconnen Warriors	18 – 16	Yass Magpies	Sunday, 18 July, 3:00pm	Raiders Belconnen	Houshyar Fallah
Woden Valley Rams		Bye

==== Round 13 ====
Home	Score	Away	Match information
Home	Score	Away	Date and time	Venue	Referee
Yass Magpies	Washout	Gungahlin Bulls	Saturday, 24 July, 3:00pm	Walker Park	N/A
Woden Valley Rams	Washout	West Belconnen Warriors	Saturday, 24 July, 3:00pm	Phillip Oval	N/A
Queanbeyan United Blues	Washout	Tuggeranong Bushrangers	Saturday, 24 July, 3:00pm	Seiffert Oval	N/A
Belconnen United Sharks	Washout	Queanbeyan Kangaroos	Saturday, 24 July, 3:00pm	NSWRL HQ Bruce	N/A
Goulburn City Bulldogs		Bye

==== Round 14 ====
Home	Score	Away	Match information
Home	Score	Away	Date and time	Venue	Referee
Tuggeranong Bushrangers	10 – 30	Yass Magpies	Saturday, 31 July, 3:00pm	Greenway Oval	Evan Bayliss
Queanbeyan Kangaroos	52 – 20	Woden Valley Rams	Saturday, 31 July, 3:00pm	Seears Workwear Oval	Andrew Wheeler
West Belconnen Warriors	16 – 24	Gungahlin Bulls	Sunday, 1 August, 3:00pm	Greenway Oval	Braiden McIntosh
Goulburn City Bulldogs	10 – 50	Queanbeyan United Blues	Sunday, 1 August, 3:00pm	Workers Arena	Houshyar Fallah
Belconnen United Sharks		Bye

==== Round 15 ====
Home	Score	Away	Match information
Home	Score	Away	Date and time	Venue	Referee
Yass Magpies	28 – 52	Queanbeyan United Blues	Saturday, 7 August, 3:00pm	Walker Park	Houshyar Fallah
Tuggeranong Bushrangers	22 – 28	Woden Valley Rams	Saturday, 7 August, 3:00pm	Greenway Oval	Andrew Wheeler
Queanbeyan Kangaroos	42 – 22	Goulburn City Bulldogs	Saturday, 7 August, 3:00pm	Seears Workwear Oval	Braiden McIntosh
Gungahlin Bulls	28 – 14	Belconnen United Sharks	Sunday, 8 August, 3:00pm	Gungahlin Enclosed Oval	Evan Bayliss
West Belconnen Warriors		Bye

==== Round 16 ====
Home	Score	Away	Match information
Home	Score	Away	Date and time	Venue	Referee
West Belconnen Warriors	Cancelled	Queanbeyan Kangaroos	Saturday, 14 August, 3:00pm	Raiders Belconnen	N/A
Queanbeyan United Blues	Cancelled	Gungahlin Bulls	Saturday, 14 August, 3:00pm	Seiffert Oval	N/A
Woden Valley Rams	Cancelled	Yass Magpies	Sunday, 15 August, 3:00pm	Phillip Oval	N/A
Goulburn City Bulldogs	Cancelled	Belconnen United Sharks	Sunday, 15 August, 3:00pm	Workers Arena	N/A
Tuggeranong Bushrangers		Bye

==== Round 17 ====
Home	Score	Away	Match information
Home	Score	Away	Date and time	Venue	Referee
Woden Valley Rams	Cancelled	Belconnen United Sharks	Saturday, 21 August, 3:00pm	Phillip Oval	N/A
Tuggeranong Bushrangers	Cancelled	West Belconnen Warriors	Saturday, 21 August, 3:00pm	Greenway Oval	N/A
Queanbeyan Kangaroos	Cancelled	Gungahlin Bulls	Saturday, 21 August, 3:00pm	Seears Workwear Oval	N/A
Goulburn City Bulldogs	Cancelled	Yass Magpies	Sunday, 22 August, 3:00pm	Workers Arena	N/A
Queanbeyan United Blues		Bye

==== Round 18 ====
Home	Score	Away	Match information
Home	Score	Away	Date and time	Venue	Referee
Yass Magpies	Cancelled	Queanbeyan Kangaroos	Saturday, 28 August, 3:00pm	Walker Park	N/A
Tuggeranong Bushrangers	Cancelled	Goulburn City Bulldogs	Saturday, 28 August, 3:00pm	Greenway Oval	N/A
Queanbeyan United Blues	Cancelled	Woden Valley Rams	Saturday, 28 August, 3:00pm	Seiffert Oval	N/A
Belconnen United Sharks	Cancelled	West Belconnen Warriors	Saturday, 28 August, 3:00pm	NSWRL HQ Bruce	N/A
Gungahlin Bulls		Bye

=== Finals series ===
Minor and major semi-finals
1	Gungahlin
2	Queanbeyan United
3	Queanbeyan
4	West Belconnen

Preliminary final
1/2
3/4

Grand final
1/2
1/2/3/4

Home	Score	Away	Match information
Home	Score	Away	Date and time	Venue	Referee
Minor and major semi-finals
Queanbeyan Kangaroos	Cancelled	West Belconnen Warriors	4/5 September	TBA	TBD
Gungahlin Bulls	Cancelled	Queanbeyan United Blues	4/5 September	TBA	TBD
Preliminary final
Major SF loser	Cancelled	Minor SF winner	11/12 September	TBA	TBD
Grand final
Major SF winner	Cancelled	PF winner	Sunday, 19 September, 3:00pm	Seiffert Oval	TBD

== George Tooke Shield (Second Division) ==
Ten teams played in 2021: three from Canberra, and seven from New South Wales towns surrounding Canberra.

2021 George Tooke Shield
- Duration: TBA
- Teams: 11
- Broadcast partners: Bar TV Sports

Colours	Club	Season	Home ground(s)	Head coach
	Binalong Brahmans	15th season	Binalong Recreation Ground	Nathan Lalliard
	Boomanulla Raiders	35th season	Boomanulla Oval	N/A
	Boorowa Rovers	13th season	Boorowa Showground	Alexander Stewart
	Bungendore Tigers	56th season	Mick Sherd Oval	Jack Bramley
	Burrangong Bears	2nd season	Cranfield Oval	Barry Edwards
	Cootamundra Bulldogs	1st season	Les Boyd Oval	Aaron Byrne
	Crookwell Green Devils	28th season	Crookwell Memorial Oval	Brian Gray
	Harden Hawks	12th season	McLean Oval	Luke Brown
	North Canberra Bears	11th season	Kaleen Enclosed Oval	Brian Hogan
	University of Canberra Stars	5th season	Raiders Belconnen	Jerome Mose

=== Ladder ===
Pos	Team	Pld	W	D	L	PF	PA	PD	Pts
1	North Canberra Bears	12	11	0	1	310	132	+178	22
2	Bungendore Tigers	12	9	0	3	340	118	+222	18
3	Cootamundra Bulldogs	12	9	0	3	284	138	+146	17
4	Harden Hawks	12	8	1	3	222	175	+47	17
5	Binalong Brahmans	12	7	0	5	168	168	0	14
6	Boorowa Rovers	11	4	0	7	140	266	−126	10
7	Crookwell Green Devils	12	3	1	8	130	228	−98	7
8	Boomanulla Raiders	11	2	0	9	113	312	−199	6
9	University of Canberra Stars	12	3	2	7	118	288	−170	2
10	Burrangong Bears	10	0	0	10	32	485	−453	0

Updated to match(es) played on 7 August. Source:
Rules for classification: 1) points; 2) point difference; 3) points scored

==== Ladder progression ====
- Numbers highlighted in green indicate that the team finished the round inside the top 5.
- Numbers highlighted in blue indicate that the team finished first on the ladder in that round.
- Numbers highlighted in red indicate that the team finished last place on the ladder in that round.
- Underlined numbers indicate that the team had a bye during that round.

Pos	Team	1	2	3	4	5	6	7	8	9	10	11	12	13	14	15
1	North Canberra Bears	2	2	4	6	8	10	22	14	16	18	18	20	22	22	22
2	Bungendore Tigers	2	4	6	6	6	8	18	10	12	14	14	16	18	18	18
3	Cootamundra Bulldogs	2	4	6	8	10	12	18	14	14	16	16	16	17	17	17
4	Harden Hawks	0	2	2	4	6	17	16	10	12	12	12	14	16	16	17
5	Binalong Brahmans	0	0	2	4	6	8	14	10	12	14	14	14	14	14	14
6	Boorowa Rovers	2	4	4	6	6	6	10	8	8	8	8	10	10	10	10
7	Crookwell Green Devils	0	0	0	0	0	0	7	2	4	4	4	6	6	7	7
8	Boomanulla Raiders	2	2	4	4	4	4	6	4	4	4	4	4	6	6	6
9	University of Canberra Stars	0	2	2	2	4	2	1	4	4	6	6	0	0	1	2
10	Burrangong Bears	0	0	0	0	0	0	0	0	0	0	0	0	0	0	0

=== Season results ===
==== Round 1 ====
Home	Score	Away	Match information
Home	Score	Away	Date and time	Venue	Referee
Boorowa Rovers	30 – 20	University of Canberra Stars	Friday, 30 April, 8:15pm	Boorowa Showground	Timothy Bailey
Boomanulla Raiders	76 – 6	Burrangong Bears	Saturday, 1 May, 2:00pm	Boomanulla Oval	Jason Severs
Binalong Brahmans	18 – 22	Cootamundra Bulldogs	Saturday, 1 May, 2:00pm	Binalong Recreation Ground	David Charman
North Canberra Bears	38 – 18	Harden Hawks	Saturday, 1 May, 2:30pm	Kaleen Enclosed Oval	Geordie Doherty
Crookwell Green Devils	10 – 34	Bungendore Tigers	Saturday, 1 May, 2:30pm	Crookwell Memorial Oval	Fatu Aiono-Fatu

==== Round 2 ====
Home	Score	Away	Match information
Home	Score	Away	Date and time	Venue	Referee
Boorowa Rovers	26 – 10	Crookwell Green Devils	Saturday, 8 May, 2:00pm	Boorowa Showground	Luke Barrow
Boomanulla Raiders	4 – 40	Bungendore Tigers	Saturday, 8 May, 2:00pm	Boomanulla Oval	Jason Severs
Binalong Brahmans	18 – 24	Harden Hawks	Saturday, 8 May, 2:00pm	Binalong Recreation Ground	Geordie Doherty
University of Canberra Stars	38 – 6	Burrangong Bears	Saturday, 8 May, 2:30pm	Raiders Belconnen	Daniel Wheeler
Cootamundra Bulldogs	32 – 6	North Canberra Bears	Saturday, 8 May, 3:00pm	Les Boyd Oval	David Charman

==== Round 3 ====
Home	Score	Away	Match information
Home	Score	Away	Date and time	Venue	Referee
Burrangong Bears	0 – 56	Binalong Brahmans	Saturday, 22 May, 2:00pm	Cranfield Oval	Jason Severs
North Canberra Bears	26 – 10	University of Canberra Stars	Saturday, 22 May, 2:30pm	Kaleen Enclosed Oval	Luke Barrow
Crookwell Green Devils	18 – 24	Cootamundra Bulldogs	Saturday, 22 May, 2:30pm	Crookwell Memorial Oval	Jack Black
Bungendore Tigers	30 – 12	Boorowa Rovers	Saturday, 22 May, 2:30pm	Mick Sherd Oval	Tony McEnaney
Harden Hawks	12 – 23	Boomanulla Raiders	Saturday, 22 May, 3:20pm	McLean Oval	David Charman

==== Round 4 ====
Home	Score	Away	Match information
Home	Score	Away	Date and time	Venue	Referee
Boorowa Rovers	60 – 6	Burrangong Bears	Saturday, 29 May, 2:00pm	Boorowa Showground	Andrew Wheeler
Boomanulla Raiders	22 – 36	North Canberra Bears	Saturday, 29 May, 2:00pm	Boomanulla Oval	Daniel Wheeler
Binalong Brahmans	18 – 14	Bungendore Tigers	Saturday, 29 May, 2:00pm	Binalong Recreation Ground	Jack Black
Cootamundra Bulldogs	38 – 0	University of Canberra Stars	Saturday, 29 May, 3:00pm	Les Boyd Oval	Jason Severs
Harden Hawks	22 – 12	Crookwell Green Devils	Saturday, 29 May, 3:20pm	McLean Oval	Luke Barrow

==== Round 5 ====
Home	Score	Away	Match information
Home	Score	Away	Date and time	Venue	Referee
Burrangong Bears	8 – 58	Harden Hawks	Saturday, 5 June, 2:00pm	Cranfield Oval	Jason Severs
Binalong Brahmans	18 – 14	Crookwell Green Devils	Saturday, 5 June, 2:00pm	Binalong Recreation Ground	Geordie Doherty
University of Canberra Stars	36 – 16	Boomanulla Raiders	Saturday, 5 June, 2:30pm	Raiders Belconnen	James Charman
North Canberra Bears	16 – 10	Bungendore Tigers	Saturday, 5 June, 2:30pm	Kaleen Enclosed Oval	Luke Barrow
Cootamundra Bulldogs	40 – 4	Boorowa Rovers	Saturday, 5 June, 3:00pm	Les Boyd Oval	David Charman

==== Round 6 ====
Home	Score	Away	Match information
Home	Score	Away	Date and time	Venue	Referee
Boorowa Rovers	6 – 22	Binalong Brahmans	Saturday, 19 June, 2:00pm	Boorowa Showground	Andrew Wheeler
Crookwell Green Devils	6 – 24	North Canberra Bears	Saturday, 19 June, 2:30pm	Crookwell Memorial Oval	Fatu Aiono-Fatu
Bungendore Tigers	26* – 0	Burrangong Bears	Saturday, 19 June, 2:30pm	Mick Sherd Oval	N/A
Cootamundra Bulldogs	62 – 16	Boomanulla Raiders	Saturday, 19 June, 3:00pm	Les Boyd Oval	Jack Black
University of Canberra Stars	0 – 0	Harden Hawks	Wednesday, 18 August, 7:45pm	Raiders Belconnen	N/A

==== Round 7 ====
Home	Score	Away	Match information
Home	Score	Away	Date and time	Venue	Referee
Boomanulla Raiders	6 – 16	Binalong Brahmans	Saturday, 26 June, 1:00pm	Binalong Recreation Ground	TBD
Burrangong Bears	6 – 82	Cootamundra Bulldogs	Saturday, 26 June, 2:00pm	Cranfield Oval	Jason Severs
Boorowa Rovers	10 – 22	North Canberra Bears	Saturday, 26 June, 2:00pm	Boorowa Showground	Houshyar Fallah
University of Canberra Stars	0 – 0	Crookwell Green Devils	Saturday, 26 June, 2:00pm	Raiders Belconnen	N/A
Harden Hawks	18 – 16	Bungendore Tigers	Saturday, 26 June, 3:30pm	McLean Oval	David Charman

==== Round 8 ====
Home	Score	Away	Match information
Home	Score	Away	Date and time	Venue	Referee
Boomanulla Raiders	8 – 20	Boorowa Rovers	Saturday, 3 July, 2:00pm	Gunning Showground	Geordie Doherty
Burrangong Bears	0 – 62	Crookwell Green Devils	Saturday, 3 July, 2:00pm	Cranfield Oval	Liam Richardson
Binalong Brahmans	12 – 16	North Canberra Bears	Saturday, 3 July, 2:00pm	Binalong Recreation Ground	Tristan Brooker
Bungendore Tigers	56 – 10	University of Canberra Stars	Saturday, 3 July, 2:30pm	Mick Sherd Oval	Katherine Nightingale
Cootamundra Bulldogs	10 – 24	Harden Hawks	Saturday, 3 July, 3:00pm	Les Boyd Oval	Gage Miles

==== Round 9 ====
Home	Score	Away	Match information
Home	Score	Away	Date and time	Venue	Referee
Boomanulla Raiders	6 – 20	Crookwell Green Devils	Saturday, 10 July, 2:00pm	Crookwell Memorial Oval	Nathan Gauci
University of Canberra Stars	16 – 22	Binalong Brahmans	Saturday, 10 July, 2:30pm	Raiders Belconnen	Jason Severs
North Canberra Bears	14* – 0	Burrangong Bears	Saturday, 10 July, 2:30pm	Kaleen Enclosed Oval	N/A
Cootamundra Bulldogs	6 – 22	Bungendore Tigers	Saturday, 10 July, 3:00pm	Les Boyd Oval	David Charman
Harden Hawks	38 – 16	Boorowa Rovers	Saturday, 10 July, 3:20pm	McLean Oval	Jack Black

==== Round 10 ====
Home	Score	Away	Match information
Home	Score	Away	Date and time	Venue	Referee
Boomanulla Raiders	16 – 18	University of Canberra Stars	Saturday, 17 July, 2:00pm	Keith Tournier Memorial Oval	Jason Severs
Binalong Brahmans	13* – 0	Burrangong Bears	Saturday, 17 July, 2:00pm	Binalong Recreation Ground	N/A
Boorowa Rovers	12 – 36	Bungendore Tigers	Saturday, 17 July, 2:30pm	Boorowa Showground	Liam Richardson
Cootamundra Bulldogs	18 – 6	Crookwell Green Devils	Saturday, 17 July, 3:00pm	Les Boyd Oval	Nathan Gauci
Harden Hawks	6 – 22	North Canberra Bears	Saturday, 17 July, 3:20pm	McLean Oval	Gage Miles

==== Round 11 ====
Home	Score	Away	Match information
Home	Score	Away	Date and time	Venue	Referee
Binalong Brahmans	Washout	Boorowa Rovers	Saturday, 24 July, 2:00pm	Binalong Recreation Ground	N/A
North Canberra Bears	Washout	Cootamundra Bulldogs	Saturday, 24 July, 2:30pm	Kaleen Enclosed Oval	N/A
Crookwell Green Devils	Washout	Harden Hawks	Saturday, 24 July, 2:30pm	Crookwell Memorial Oval	N/A
Bungendore Tigers	Washout	Boomanulla Raiders	Saturday, 24 July, 2:30pm	Mick Sherd Oval	N/A
University of Canberra Stars		Bye

==== Round 12 ====
Home	Score	Away	Match information
Home	Score	Away	Date and time	Venue	Referee
University of Canberra Stars	8 – 42	Bungendore Tigers	Saturday, 31 July, 1:30pm	Mick Sherd Oval	Daniel Wheeler
North Canberra Bears	52 – 6	Boomanulla Raiders	Saturday, 31 July, 2:30pm	Kaleen Enclosed Oval	Tristan Brooker
Crookwell Green Devils	30 – 20	Binalong Brahmans	Saturday, 31 July, 2:30pm	Crookwell Memorial Oval	Jason McManus
Harden Hawks	20 – 16	Cootamundra Bulldogs	Saturday, 31 July, 3:20pm	McLean Oval	William Drury
Boorowa Rovers		Bye

==== Round 13 ====
Home	Score	Away	Match information
Home	Score	Away	Date and time	Venue	Referee
Boorowa Rovers	4 – 40	Harden Hawks	Saturday, 7 August, 2:00pm	Boorowa Showground	Luke Barrow
University of Canberra Stars	0 – 52	North Canberra Bears	Saturday, 7 August, 2:30pm	Raiders Belconnen	James Charman
Bungendore Tigers	40 – 4	Crookwell Green Devils	Saturday, 7 August, 2:30pm	Mick Sherd Oval	Katherine Nightingale
Cootamundra Bulldogs	20 – 4	Binalong Brahmans	Saturday, 7 August, 3:00pm	Les Boyd Oval	David Charman
Boomanulla Raiders		Bye

==== Round 14 ====
Home	Score	Away	Match information
Home	Score	Away	Date and time	Venue	Referee
Bungendore Tigers	Cancelled	North Canberra Bears	Saturday, 14 August, 1:30pm	Mick Sherd Oval	N/A
Binalong Brahmans	Cancelled	University of Canberra Stars	Saturday, 14 August, 2:00pm	Binalong Recreation Ground	N/A
Boorowa Rovers	Cancelled	Cootamundra Bulldogs	Saturday, 14 August, 2:30pm	Boorowa Showground	N/A
Crookwell Green Devils	Cancelled	Boomanulla Raiders	Sunday, 15 August, 2:00pm	Gunning Showground	N/A
Harden Hawks		Bye

==== Round 15 ====
Home	Score	Away	Match information
Home	Score	Away	Date and time	Venue	Referee
Boomanulla Raiders	Cancelled	Cootamundra Bulldogs	Saturday, 21 August, 2:00pm	Boomanulla Oval	N/A
University of Canberra Stars	Cancelled	Boorowa Rovers	Saturday, 21 August, 2:30pm	Raiders Belconnen	N/A
North Canberra Bears	Cancelled	Binalong Brahmans	Saturday, 21 August, 2:30pm	Kaleen Enclosed Oval	N/A
Bungendore Tigers	Cancelled	Harden Hawks	Saturday, 21 August, 2:30pm	Mick Sherd Oval	N/A
Crookwell Green Devils		Bye

=== Finals series ===
Qualifying/elimination finals
2	Bungendore
3	Cootamundra
4	Harden
5	Binalong

Minor and major semi-finals
1	North Canberra
2	Bungendore
3	Cootamundra
4	Harden

Preliminary final
1/2
3/4

Grand final
1/2
1/2/3/4

Home	Score	Away	Match information
Home	Score	Away	Date and time	Venue	Referee
Qualifying/elimination finals
Bungendore Tigers	Cancelled	Cootamundra Bulldogs	28/29 August	TBD	N/A
Harden Hawks	Cancelled	Binalong Brahmans	28/29 August	TBD	N/A
Minor and major semi-finals
North Canberra Bears	Cancelled	Bungendore Tigers	4/5 September	TBD	TBD
Cootamundra Bulldogs	Cancelled	Harden Hawks	4/5 September	TBD	TBD
Preliminary final
Major SF loser	Cancelled	Minor SF winner	11/12 September	TBD	TBD
Grand final
Major SF winner	Cancelled	PF winner	18/19 September	TBD	TBD

== Reserve Grade ==
=== Teams ===
Colours	Club	Home ground(s)	Head coach
	Belconnen United Sharks	NSWRL HQ Bruce	Desmond Faigafa
	Goulburn City Bulldogs	Workers Arena	Michael Campton-Smith
	Gungahlin Bulls	Gungahlin Enclosed Oval	Benjamin Flynn
	Queanbeyan Kangaroos	Seears Workwear Oval	Troy Whiley
	Queanbeyan United Blues	Seiffert Oval	Liuaki Ahosivi
	Tuggeranong Bushrangers	Greenway Oval	Darren Dodds
	West Belconnen Warriors	Raiders Belconnen	Matt Corscaden
	Woden Valley Rams	Phillip Oval	Albert Camilleri
	Yass Magpies	Walker Park	Christopher Rawlinson

=== Ladder ===
Pos	Team	Pld	W	D	L	PF	PA	PD	Pts
1	Yass Magpies RG	12	8	1	3	318	204	+114	21
2	Queanbeyan United Blues RG	13	9	0	4	366	232	+134	20
3	Queanbeyan Kangaroos RG	12	8	0	4	302	208	+94	20
4	Gungahlin Bulls RG	13	8	1	4	348	236	+112	19
5	Woden Valley Rams RG	12	7	0	5	416	206	+210	18
6	West Belconnen Warriors RG	12	7	0	5	294	236	+58	18
7	Goulburn City Bulldogs RG	13	4	0	9	212	334	−122	10
8	Belconnen United Sharks RG	12	3	0	9	190	410	−220	10
9	Tuggeranong Bushrangers RG	13	1	0	12	156	536	−380	4

Updated to match(es) played on 8 August. Source:
Rules for classification: 1) points; 2) point difference; 3) points scored

==== Ladder progression ====
- Numbers highlighted in green indicate that the team finished the round inside the top 4.
- Numbers highlighted in blue indicate that the team finished first on the ladder in that round.
- Numbers highlighted in red indicate that the team finished last place on the ladder in that round.
- Underlined numbers indicate that the team had a bye during that round.

Pos	Team	1	2	3	4	5	6	7	8	9	10	11	12	13	14	15	16	17	18
1	Yass Magpies RG	2	4	6	7	9	11	13	13	13	15	17	19	19	21	21	21	21	21
2	Queanbeyan United Blues RG	2	2	4	6	8	8	10	12	14	16	16	16	16	18	20	20	20	20
3	Queanbeyan Kangaroos RG	2	2	4	4	4	6	8	8	10	12	14	16	16	18	20	20	20	20
4	Gungahlin Bulls RG	0	2	2	3	3	5	7	9	11	11	13	15	15	17	19	19	19	19
5	Woden Valley Rams RG	2	4	4	4	6	6	8	10	10	12	14	16	16	16	18	18	18	18
6	West Belconnen Warriors RG	2	4	6	8	8	8	8	10	12	14	16	16	16	16	18	18	18	18
7	Goulburn City Bulldogs RG	0	2	2	4	6	6	6	8	10	10	10	10	10	10	10	10	10	10
8	Belconnen United Sharks RG	0	0	2	4	6	8	8	8	8	8	8	8	8	10	10	10	10	10
9	Tuggeranong Bushrangers RG	0	0	0	0	0	2	2	2	2	2	2	4	4	4	4	4	4	4

=== Season results ===
==== Round 1 ====
Home	Score	Away	Match information
Home	Score	Away	Date and time	Venue	Referee
Tuggeranong Bushrangers	14 – 44	Queanbeyan Kangaroos	Saturday, 10 April, 1:20pm	Greenway Oval	Evan Bayliss
Queanbeyan United Blues	62 – 6	Belconnen United Sharks	Saturday, 10 April, 1:20pm	Seiffert Oval	Andrew Nightingale
Gungahlin Bulls	10 – 30	Woden Valley Rams	Saturday, 10 April, 1:20pm	Gungahlin Enclosed Oval	David Charman
Goulburn City Bulldogs	18 – 24	West Belconnen Warriors	Sunday, 11 April, 1:20pm	Workers Arena	Jason McManus
Yass Magpies		Bye

==== Round 2 ====
Home	Score	Away	Match information
Home	Score	Away	Date and time	Venue	Referee
Woden Valley Rams	76 – 6	Tuggeranong Bushrangers	Saturday, 17 April, 1:20pm	Phillip Oval	Evan Bayliss
Queanbeyan United Blues	16 – 20	Yass Magpies	Saturday, 17 April, 1:20pm	Seiffert Oval	Jason McManus
Belconnen United Sharks	24 – 34	Gungahlin Bulls	Saturday, 17 April, 1:20pm	NSWRL HQ Bruce	Andrew Nightingale
Goulburn City Bulldogs	12 – 10	Queanbeyan Kangaroos	Sunday, 18 April, 1:20pm	Workers Arena	Andrew Wheeler
West Belconnen Warriors		Bye

==== Round 3 ====
Home	Score	Away	Match information
Home	Score	Away	Date and time	Venue	Referee
Yass Magpies	36 – 4	Tuggeranong Bushrangers	Saturday, 24 April, 1:20pm	Walker Park	Tristan Brooker
Woden Valley Rams	18 – 30	Queanbeyan Kangaroos	Saturday, 24 April, 1:20pm	Phillip Oval	Andrew Wheeler
Queanbeyan United Blues	28 – 22	Goulburn City Bulldogs	Saturday, 24 April, 1:20pm	Seiffert Oval	Jason McManus
Gungahlin Bulls	8 – 34	West Belconnen Warriors	Saturday, 24 April, 1:20pm	Gungahlin Enclosed Oval	David Charman
Belconnen United Sharks		Bye

==== Round 4 ====
Home	Score	Away	Match information
Home	Score	Away	Date and time	Venue	Referee
West Belconnen Warriors	24 – 18	Woden Valley Rams	Saturday, 1 May, 12:15pm	Raiders Belconnen	Jason McManus
Tuggeranong Bushrangers	10 – 48	Queanbeyan United Blues	Saturday, 1 May, 1:20pm	Greenway Oval	Jack Black
Queanbeyan Kangaroos	4 – 32	Belconnen United Sharks	Saturday, 1 May, 1:20pm	Seears Workwear Oval	Mark Ryan
Gungahlin Bulls	18 – 18	Yass Magpies	Saturday, 1 May, 1:20pm	Gungahlin Enclosed Oval	Daniel Wheeler
Goulburn City Bulldogs		Bye

==== Round 5 ====
Home	Score	Away	Match information
Home	Score	Away	Date and time	Venue	Referee
Yass Magpies	28 – 16	West Belconnen Warriors	Saturday, 8 May, 1:20pm	Walker Park	Jack Black
Queanbeyan United Blues	26 – 18	Queanbeyan Kangaroos	Saturday, 8 May, 1:20pm	Seiffert Oval	Ross Walters
Belconnen United Sharks	32 – 20	Tuggeranong Bushrangers	Saturday, 8 May, 1:20pm	NSWRL HQ Bruce	James Charman
Goulburn City Bulldogs	32 – 18	Gungahlin Bulls	Sunday, 9 May, 1:20pm	Workers Arena	Tristan Brooker
Woden Valley Rams		Bye

==== Round 6 ====
Home	Score	Away	Match information
Home	Score	Away	Date and time	Venue	Referee
Gungahlin Bulls	32 – 8	Queanbeyan United Blues	Saturday, 22 May, 1:00pm	Gungahlin Enclosed Oval	James Gould
Yass Magpies	24 – 16	Woden Valley Rams	Saturday, 22 May, 1:20pm	Walker Park	Fatu Aiono-Fatu
Queanbeyan Kangaroos	40 – 6	West Belconnen Warriors	Saturday, 22 May, 1:20pm	Seears Workwear Oval	Tristan Brooker
Belconnen United Sharks	26 – 18	Goulburn City Bulldogs	Saturday, 22 May, 1:20pm	NSWRL HQ Bruce	Braiden McIntosh
Tuggeranong Bushrangers		Bye

==== Round 7 ====
Home	Score	Away	Match information
Home	Score	Away	Date and time	Venue	Referee
Woden Valley Rams	34 – 12	Goulburn City Bulldogs	Saturday, 29 May, 1:20pm	Phillip Oval	Fatu Aiono-Fatu
West Belconnen Warriors	12 – 18	Queanbeyan United Blues	Saturday, 29 May, 1:20pm	Raiders Belconnen	David Charman
Tuggeranong Bushrangers	10 – 38	Gungahlin Bulls	Saturday, 29 May, 1:20pm	Greenway Oval	James Gould
Belconnen United Sharks	8 – 32	Yass Magpies	Saturday, 29 May, 1:20pm	NSWRL HQ Bruce	Braiden McIntosh
Queanbeyan Kangaroos		Bye

==== Round 8 ====
Home	Score	Away	Match information
Home	Score	Away	Date and time	Venue	Referee
Yass Magpies	16 – 22	Goulburn City Bulldogs	Saturday, 5 June, 1:20pm	Walker Park	Jack Black
Gungahlin Bulls	32 – 12	Queanbeyan Kangaroos	Saturday, 5 June, 1:20pm	Gungahlin Enclosed Oval	Andrew Wheeler
Belconnen United Sharks	16 – 52	Woden Valley Rams	Saturday, 5 June, 1:20pm	NSWRL HQ Bruce	Jason McManus
West Belconnen Warriors	52 – 4	Tuggeranong Bushrangers	Sunday, 6 June, 1:20pm	Raiders Belconnen	Daniel Wheeler
Queanbeyan United Blues		Bye

==== Round 9 ====
Home	Score	Away	Match information
Home	Score	Away	Date and time	Venue	Referee
Woden Valley Rams	20 – 24	Queanbeyan United Blues	Saturday, 19 June, 1:20pm	Phillip Oval	Jason McManus
Queanbeyan Kangaroos	22 – 10	Yass Magpies	Saturday, 19 June, 1:20pm	Seears Workwear Oval	Luke Barrow
West Belconnen Warriors	34 – 16	Belconnen United Sharks	Sunday, 20 June, 1:20pm	Raiders Belconnen	Daniel Wheeler
Goulburn City Bulldogs	26 – 24	Tuggeranong Bushrangers	Sunday, 20 June, 1:20pm	Workers Arena	Gage Miles
Gungahlin Bulls		Bye

==== Round 10 ====
Home	Score	Away	Match information
Home	Score	Away	Date and time	Venue	Referee
Woden Valley Rams	32 – 20	Gungahlin Bulls	Saturday, 3 July, 12:20pm	Phillip Oval	Luke Barrow
West Belconnen Warriors	30 – 8	Goulburn City Bulldogs	Saturday, 3 July, 1:20pm	Raiders Belconnen	James Charman
Queanbeyan Kangaroos	34 – 8	Tuggeranong Bushrangers	Saturday, 3 July, 1:20pm	Seears Workwear Oval	Jason Severs
Belconnen United Sharks	12 – 42	Queanbeyan United Blues	Saturday, 3 July, 1:20pm	NSWRL HQ Bruce	Jack Black
Yass Magpies		Bye

==== Round 11 ====
Home	Score	Away	Match information
Home	Score	Away	Date and time	Venue	Referee
Yass Magpies	36 – 6	Belconnen United Sharks	Saturday, 10 July, 1:20pm	Walker Park	Tristan Brooker
Queanbeyan United Blues	16 – 22	West Belconnen Warriors	Saturday, 10 July, 1:20pm	Seiffert Oval	Luke Barrow
Gungahlin Bulls	22 – 12	Tuggeranong Bushrangers	Saturday, 10 July, 1:20pm	Gungahlin Enclosed Oval	Liam Richardson
Goulburn City Bulldogs	6 – 28	Woden Valley Rams	Saturday, 10 July, 1:20pm	Workers Arena	Jason McManus
Queanbeyan Kangaroos		Bye

==== Round 12 ====
Home	Score	Away	Match information
Home	Score	Away	Date and time	Venue	Referee
Tuggeranong Bushrangers	26 – 12	Belconnen United Sharks	Saturday, 17 July, 12:20pm	Greenway Oval	Jason McManus
Queanbeyan Kangaroos	30 – 10	Queanbeyan United Blues	Saturday, 17 July, 1:05pm	Seears Workwear Oval	Daniel Wheeler
Gungahlin Bulls	34 – 12	Goulburn City Bulldogs	Saturday, 17 July, 1:20pm	Gungahlin Enclosed Oval	Luke Barrow
West Belconnen Warriors	28 – 30	Yass Magpies	Sunday, 18 July, 1:20pm	Raiders Belconnen	Andrew Wheeler
Woden Valley Rams		Bye

==== Round 13 ====
Home	Score	Away	Match information
Home	Score	Away	Date and time	Venue	Referee
Yass Magpies	Washout	Gungahlin Bulls	Saturday, 24 July, 1:20pm	Walker Park	N/A
Woden Valley Rams	Washout	West Belconnen Warriors	Saturday, 24 July, 1:20pm	Phillip Oval	N/A
Queanbeyan United Blues	Washout	Tuggeranong Bushrangers	Saturday, 24 July, 1:20pm	Seiffert Oval	N/A
Belconnen United Sharks	Washout	Queanbeyan Kangaroos	Saturday, 24 July, 1:20pm	NSWRL HQ Bruce	N/A
Goulburn City Bulldogs		Bye

==== Round 14 ====
Home	Score	Away	Match information
Home	Score	Away	Date and time	Venue	Referee
Tuggeranong Bushrangers	12 – 50	Yass Magpies	Saturday, 31 July, 1:20pm	Greenway Oval	Luke Barrow
Queanbeyan Kangaroos	28 – 26	Woden Valley Rams	Saturday, 31 July, 1:20pm	Seears Workwear Oval	James Charman
West Belconnen Warriors	12 – 32	Gungahlin Bulls	Sunday, 1 August, 1:20pm	Greenway Oval	David Charman
Goulburn City Bulldogs	10 – 32	Queanbeyan United Blues	Sunday, 1 August, 1:20pm	Workers Arena	Gage Miles
Belconnen United Sharks		Bye

==== Round 15 ====
Home	Score	Away	Match information
Home	Score	Away	Date and time	Venue	Referee
Yass Magpies	18 – 36	Queanbeyan United Blues	Saturday, 7 August, 1:20pm	Walker Park	Andrew Nightingale
Tuggeranong Bushrangers	6 – 66	Woden Valley Rams	Saturday, 7 August, 1:20pm	Greenway Oval	Jason McManus
Queanbeyan Kangaroos	30 – 14	Goulburn City Bulldogs	Saturday, 7 August, 1:20pm	Seears Workwear Oval	Gage Miles
Gungahlin Bulls	50 – 0	Belconnen United Sharks	Sunday, 8 August, 1:20pm	Gungahlin Enclosed Oval	Daniel Wheeler
West Belconnen Warriors		Bye

==== Round 16 ====
Home	Score	Away	Match information
Home	Score	Away	Date and time	Venue	Referee
West Belconnen Warriors	Cancelled	Queanbeyan Kangaroos	Saturday, 14 August, 1:20pm	Raiders Belconnen	N/A
Queanbeyan United Blues	Cancelled	Gungahlin Bulls	Saturday, 14 August, 1:20pm	Seiffert Oval	N/A
Woden Valley Rams	Cancelled	Yass Magpies	Sunday, 15 August, 1:20pm	Phillip Oval	N/A
Goulburn City Bulldogs	Cancelled	Belconnen United Sharks	Sunday, 15 August, 1:20pm	Workers Arena	N/A
Tuggeranong Bushrangers		Bye

==== Round 17 ====
Home	Score	Away	Match information
Home	Score	Away	Date and time	Venue	Referee
Woden Valley Rams	Cancelled	Belconnen United Sharks	Saturday, 21 August, 1:20pm	Phillip Oval	N/A
Tuggeranong Bushrangers	Cancelled	West Belconnen Warriors	Saturday, 21 August, 1:20pm	Greenway Oval	N/A
Queanbeyan Kangaroos	Cancelled	Gungahlin Bulls	Saturday, 21 August, 1:20pm	Seears Workwear Oval	N/A
Goulburn City Bulldogs	Cancelled	Yass Magpies	Sunday, 22 August, 1:20pm	Workers Arena	N/A
Queanbeyan United Blues		Bye

==== Round 18 ====
Home	Score	Away	Match information
Home	Score	Away	Date and time	Venue	Referee
Yass Magpies	Cancelled	Queanbeyan Kangaroos	Saturday, 28 August, 1:20pm	Walker Park	N/A
Tuggeranong Bushrangers	Cancelled	Goulburn City Bulldogs	Saturday, 28 August, 1:20pm	Greenway Oval	N/A
Queanbeyan United Blues	Cancelled	Woden Valley Rams	Saturday, 28 August, 1:20pm	Seiffert Oval	N/A
Belconnen United Sharks	Cancelled	West Belconnen Warriors	Saturday, 28 August, 1:20pm	NSWRL HQ Bruce	N/A
Gungahlin Bulls		Bye

==== Finals series ====
Minor and major semi-finals
1	Yass
2	Queanbeyan United
3	Queanbeyan
4	Gungahlin

Preliminary final
1/2
3/4

Grand final
1/2
1/2/3/4

Home	Score	Away	Match information
Home	Score	Away	Date and time	Venue	Referee
Minor and major semi-finals
Queanbeyan Kangaroos	Cancelled	Gungahlin Bulls	4/5 September	TBA	TBD
Yass Magpies	Cancelled	Queanbeyan United Blues	4/5 September	TBA	TBD
Preliminary final
Major SF loser	Cancelled	Minor SF winner	11/12 September	TBA	TBD
Grand final
Major SF winner	Cancelled	PF winner	Sunday, 19 September, 1:10pm	Seiffert Oval	TBD

== Under 19s ==
=== Teams ===
Colours	Club	Home ground(s)	Head coach
	Crookwell Green Devils	Crookwell Memorial Oval	Dayne Haynes
	Goulburn City Bulldogs	Workers Arena	Shane McCallum
	Gungahlin Bulls	Gungahlin Enclosed Oval	Patrick Clark
	Harden-Boorowa	McLean Oval, Boorowa Showground	Scott Duncan
	Queanbeyan United Blues	Seiffert Oval	Brendan Bradley
	Yass Magpies	Walker Park	Jack Lemon

=== Ladder ===
Pos	Team	Pld	W	D	L	PF	PA	PD	Pts
1	Goulburn City Bulldogs U19s	11	10	0	1	340	88	+252	20
2	Gungahlin Bulls U19s	11	9	0	2	362	140	+222	18
3	Queanbeyan United Blues U19s	11	6	0	5	252	201	+51	12
4	Yass Magpies U19s	11	5	1	5	241	216	+25	11
5	Harden-Boorowa U19s	11	2	1	8	120	318	−198	5
6	Crookwell Green Devils U19s	11	0	0	11	108	460	−352	0

Updated to match(es) played on 8 August. Source:
Rules for classification: 1) points; 2) point difference; 3) points scored

==== Ladder progression ====
- Numbers highlighted in green indicate that the team finished the round inside the top 4.
- Numbers highlighted in blue indicate that the team finished first on the ladder in that round.
- Numbers highlighted in red indicate that the team finished last place on the ladder in that round.

Pos	Team	1	2	3	4	5	6	7	8	9	10	11	12	13	14	15
1	Goulburn City Bulldogs U19s	2	4	6	8	10	12	14	16	16	16	18	20	20	20	20
2	Gungahlin Bulls U19s	2	2	4	6	8	8	10	12	14	14	16	18	18	18	18
3	Queanbeyan United Blues U19s	2	4	4	4	6	8	8	10	10	10	10	12	12	12	12
4	Yass Magpies U19s	0	2	4	5	5	5	7	7	9	9	11	11	11	11	11
5	Harden-Boorowa U19s	0	0	0	1	1	3	3	3	5	5	5	5	5	5	5
6	Crookwell Green Devils U19s	0	0	0	0	0	0	0	0	0	0	0	0	0	0	0

=== Season results ===
==== Round 1 ====
Home	Score	Away	Match information
Home	Score	Away	Date and time	Venue	Referee
Harden-Boorowa	4 – 70	Queanbeyan United Blues	Saturday, 1 May, 12:00pm	Kaleen Enclosed Oval	Katherine Nightingale
Crookwell Green Devils	10 – 36	Goulburn City Bulldogs	Saturday, 1 May, 12:00pm	Crookwell Memorial Oval	Liam Richardson
Gungahlin Bulls	36 – 20	Yass Magpies	Saturday, 1 May, 12:00pm	Gungahlin Enclosed Oval	Aidan Richardson

==== Round 2 ====
Home	Score	Away	Match information
Home	Score	Away	Date and time	Venue	Referee
Yass Magpies	14* – 0	Harden-Boorowa	Saturday, 8 May, 10:30am	Walker Park	N/A
Queanbeyan United Blues	14* – 0	Crookwell Green Devils	Saturday, 8 May, 10:30am	Seiffert Oval	N/A
Goulburn City Bulldogs	30 – 16	Gungahlin Bulls	Sunday, 9 May, 12:00pm	Workers Arena	Gage Miles

==== Round 3 ====
Home	Score	Away	Match information
Home	Score	Away	Date and time	Venue	Referee
Yass Magpies	36 – 12	Crookwell Green Devils	Saturday, 22 May, 10:30am	Walker Park	Aidan Richardson
Harden-Boorowa	10 – 20	Goulburn City Bulldogs	Saturday, 22 May, 11:30am	McLean Oval	Gage Miles
Gungahlin Bulls	32 – 10	Queanbeyan United Blues	Saturday, 22 May, 11:40am	Gungahlin Enclosed Oval	Liam Richardson

==== Round 4 ====
Home	Score	Away	Match information
Home	Score	Away	Date and time	Venue	Referee
Queanbeyan United Blues	0 – 48	Goulburn City Bulldogs	Saturday, 29 May, 10:30am	Raiders Belconnen	Gage Miles
Harden-Boorowa	20 – 20	Yass Magpies	Saturday, 29 May, 11:50am	Boorowa Showground	Aidan Richardson
Crookwell Green Devils	14 – 60	Gungahlin Bulls	Saturday, 29 May, 12:00pm	NSWRL HQ Bruce	Liam Richardson

==== Round 5 ====
Home	Score	Away	Match information
Home	Score	Away	Date and time	Venue	Referee
Yass Magpies	10 – 20	Goulburn City Bulldogs	Saturday, 5 June, 10:30am	Walker Park	Gage Miles
Queanbeyan United Blues	22* – 0	Crookwell Green Devils	Saturday, 5 June, 10:30am	Binalong Recreation Ground	N/A
Gungahlin Bulls	42 – 8	Harden-Boorowa	Saturday, 5 June, 12:00pm	Gungahlin Enclosed Oval	Liam Richardson

==== Round 6 ====
Home	Score	Away	Match information
Home	Score	Away	Date and time	Venue	Referee
Yass Magpies	22 – 42	Queanbeyan United Blues	Saturday, 19 June, 12:00pm	Seears Workwear Oval	Gage Miles
Crookwell Green Devils	26 – 28	Harden-Boorowa	Saturday, 19 June, 12:00pm	Crookwell Memorial Oval	Benjamin Munroe
Goulburn City Bulldogs	20 – 10	Gungahlin Bulls	Sunday, 20 June, 12:10pm	Workers Arena	Aidan Richardson

==== Round 7 ====
Home	Score	Away	Match information
Home	Score	Away	Date and time	Venue	Referee
Harden-Boorowa	12 – 18	Gungahlin Bulls	Saturday, 3 July, 10:15am	Gunning Showground	James Gould
Crookwell Green Devils	6 – 68	Goulburn City Bulldogs	Saturday, 3 July, 10:30am	Raiders Belconnen	Andrew O'Brien
Yass Magpies	23 – 14	Queanbeyan United Blues	Saturday, 3 July, 10:30am	NSWRL HQ Bruce	Benjamin Munroe

==== Round 8 ====
Home	Score	Away	Match information
Home	Score	Away	Date and time	Venue	Referee
Goulburn City Bulldogs	54 – 6	Harden-Boorowa	Saturday, 10 July, 9:40am	Workers Arena	Katherine Nightingale
Yass Magpies	14 – 28	Gungahlin Bulls	Saturday, 10 July, 10:30am	Walker Park	Gage Miles
Queanbeyan United Blues	52 – 16	Crookwell Green Devils	Saturday, 10 July, 10:30am	Seiffert Oval	Aidan Richardson

==== Round 9 ====
Home	Score	Away	Match information
Home	Score	Away	Date and time	Venue	Referee
Gungahlin Bulls	8 – 2	Goulburn City Bulldogs	Saturday, 17 July, 10:30am	Gungahlin Enclosed Oval	Aidan Richardson
Harden-Boorowa	14 – 4	Queanbeyan United Blues	Saturday, 17 July, 12:10pm	Boorowa Showground	Katherine Nightingale
Yass Magpies	38 – 6	Crookwell Green Devils	Sunday, 18 July, 12:00pm	Raiders Belconnen	Jason Severs

==== Round 10 ====
Home	Score	Away	Match information
Home	Score	Away	Date and time	Venue	Referee
Crookwell Green Devils	Washout	Harden-Boorowa	Saturday, 24 July, 10:30am	Crookwell Memorial Oval	N/A
Yass Magpies	Washout	Gungahlin Bulls	Saturday, 24 July, 12:00pm	Walker Park	N/A
Queanbeyan United Blues	Washout	Goulburn City Bulldogs	Saturday, 24 July, 12:00pm	Seiffert Oval	N/A

==== Round 11 ====
Home	Score	Away	Match information
Home	Score	Away	Date and time	Venue	Referee
Harden-Boorowa	10 – 38	Gungahlin Bulls	Saturday, 31 July, 10:30am	McLean Oval	Liam Richardson
Crookwell Green Devils	18 – 32	Yass Magpies	Saturday, 31 July, 12:00pm	Crookwell Memorial Oval	Jack Black
Goulburn City Bulldogs	30 – 4	Queanbeyan United Blues	Saturday, 31 July, 12:10pm	Workers Arena	Jason Severs

==== Round 12 ====
Home	Score	Away	Match information
Home	Score	Away	Date and time	Venue	Referee
Yass Magpies	12 – 20	Queanbeyan United Blues	Saturday, 7 August, 10:30am	Walker Park	Aidan Richardson
Harden-Boorowa	8 – 12	Goulburn City Bulldogs	Saturday, 7 August, 11:50am	Boorowa Showground	Liam Richardson
Gungahlin Bulls	74 – 0	Crookwell Green Devils	Sunday, 8 August, 12:00pm	Gungahlin Enclosed Oval	Jack Black

==== Round 13 ====
Home	Score	Away	Match information
Home	Score	Away	Date and time	Venue	Referee
Queanbeyan United Blues	Cancelled	Gungahlin Bulls	Saturday, 14 August, 12:00pm	Seiffert Oval	N/A
Goulburn City Bulldogs	Cancelled	Yass Magpies	Sunday, 15 August, 11:50am	Workers Arena	N/A
Crookwell Green Devils	Cancelled	Harden-Boorowa	Sunday, 15 August, 12:00pm	Crookwell Memorial Oval	N/A

==== Round 14 ====
Home	Score	Away	Match information
Home	Score	Away	Date and time	Venue	Referee
Queanbeyan United Blues	Cancelled	Gungahlin Bulls	Saturday, 21 August, 10:30am	Seears Workwear Oval	N/A
Harden-Boorowa	Cancelled	Yass Magpies	Saturday, 21 August, 12:00pm	McLean Oval	N/A
Goulburn City Bulldogs	Cancelled	Crookwell Green Devils	Sunday, 22 August, 12:00pm	Workers Arena	N/A

==== Round 15 ====
Home	Score	Away	Match information
Home	Score	Away	Date and time	Venue	Referee
Yass Magpies	Cancelled	Goulburn City Bulldogs	Saturday, 28 August, 10:30am	Walker Park	N/A
Queanbeyan United Blues	Cancelled	Harden-Boorowa	Saturday, 28 August, 10:30am	Seiffert Oval	N/A
Crookwell Green Devils	Cancelled	Gungahlin Bulls	Sunday, 29 August, 12:00pm	Crookwell Memorial Oval	N/A

==== Finals series ====
Minor and major semi-finals
1	Goulburn City
2	Gungahlin
3	Queanbeyan United
4	Yass

Preliminary final
1/2
3/4

Grand final
1/2
1/2/3/4

Home	Score	Away	Match information
Home	Score	Away	Date and time	Venue	Referee
Minor and major semi-finals
Queanbeyan United Blues	Cancelled	Yass Magpies	4/5 September	TBA	TBD
Goulburn City Bulldogs	Cancelled	Gungahlin Bulls	4/5 September	TBA	TBD
Preliminary final
Major SF loser	Cancelled	Minor SF winner	11/12 September	TBA	TBD
Grand final
Major SF winner	Cancelled	PF winner	Sunday, 19 September, TBA	Seiffert Oval	TBD

== Katrina Fanning Shield (open women's tackle) ==
=== Teams ===
Colours	Club	Home ground(s)	Head coach
	Boomanulla Raiders	Boomanulla Oval	TBA
	Goulburn City Bulldogs	Workers Arena	TBA
	Harden Worhawks	McLean Oval	Mellissa Ings
	Queanbeyan United Blues	Seiffert Oval	Blake Murray
	Tuggeranong Bushrangers	Greenway Oval	Villi Ngan-Woo
	University of Canberra Stars	Raiders Belconnen	Michael Kociolek
	Yass Magpies	Walker Park	Michael Inkster

=== Ladder ===
Pos	Team	Pld	W	D	L	PF	PA	PD	Pts
1	Goulburn City Bulldogs W	10	9	0	1	352	52	+300	22
2	Yass Magpies W	10	9	0	1	348	52	+296	22
3	Queanbeyan United Blues W	10	6	0	4	304	114	+190	16
4	Tuggeranong Bushrangers W	10	5	0	5	246	170	+76	14
5	University of Canberra Stars W	9	3	1	5	64	232	−168	13
6	Harden Warhawks	10	2	1	7	66	336	−270	6
7	Boomanulla Raiders W	11	0	0	11	30	454	−424	2

Updated to match(es) played on 7 August. Source:
Rules for classification: 1) points; 2) point difference; 3) points scored

==== Ladder progression ====
- Numbers highlighted in green indicate that the team finished the round inside the top 4.
- Numbers highlighted in blue indicate that the team finished first on the ladder in that round.
- Numbers highlighted in red indicate that the team finished last place on the ladder in that round.
- Underlined numbers indicate that the team had a bye during that round.

Pos	Team	1	2	3	4	5	6	7	8	9	10	11	12	13	14	15	16	17
1	Goulburn City Bulldogs W	2	4	6	8	10	10	12	12	14	16	18	18	20	22	22	22	22
2	Yass Magpies W	2	4	6	8	10	12	12	12	14	16	18	18	20	22	22	22	22
3	Queanbeyan United Blues W	2	4	4	4	6	8	10	10	12	14	16	16	16	16	16	16	16
4	Tuggeranong Bushrangers W	0	0	2	4	6	8	8	8	10	10	12	12	12	14	14	14	14
5	University of Canberra Stars W	0	2	4	4	4	6	13	6	6	8	8	8	10	12	12	13	13
6	Harden Worhawks	2	2	2	4	4	4	6	4	6	6	6	6	8	5	5	6	6
7	Boomanulla Raiders W	0	0	0	0	0	0	2	2	2	2	2	2	2	2	2	2	2

=== Season results ===
==== Round 1 ====
Home	Score	Away	Match information
Home	Score	Away	Date and time	Venue	Referee
Yass Magpies	52 – 0	University of Canberra Stars	Saturday, 1 May, 10:30am	Seears Workwear Oval	Shannon Castle
Tuggeranong Bushrangers	12 – 24	Queanbeyan United Blues	Saturday, 1 May, 12:00pm	Greenway Oval	Steven Zorzi
Boomanulla Raiders	0 – 52	Goulburn City Bulldogs	Saturday, 1 May, 12:45pm	Boomanulla Oval	Mario Prpic
Harden Worhawks		Bye

==== Round 2 ====
Home	Score	Away	Match information
Home	Score	Away	Date and time	Venue	Referee
Yass Magpies	64 – 0	Harden Worhawks	Saturday, 8 May, 12:00pm	Walker Park	Gage Miles
Queanbeyan United Blues	62 – 6	Boomanulla Raiders	Saturday, 8 May, 12:00pm	Seiffert Oval	Mario Prpic
Goulburn City Bulldogs	60* – 0	Tuggeranong Bushrangers	Sunday, 9 May, 11:00am	Workers Arena	N/A
University of Canberra Stars		Bye

==== Round 3 ====
Home	Score	Away	Match information
Home	Score	Away	Date and time	Venue	Referee
Tuggeranong Bushrangers	36 – 4	Boomanulla Raiders	Saturday, 15 May, 11:00am	Raiders Belconnen	Mario Prpic
Queanbeyan United Blues	10 – 16	Goulburn City Bulldogs	Saturday, 15 May, 12:30pm	Raiders Belconnen	Jack Black
Harden Worhawks	4 – 18	University of Canberra Stars	Saturday, 15 May, 2:00pm	Raiders Belconnen	David Charman
Yass Magpies		Bye

==== Round 4 ====
Home	Score	Away	Match information
Home	Score	Away	Date and time	Venue	Referee
Yass Magpies	26 – 0	Queanbeyan United Blues	Saturday, 22 May, 12:00pm	Walker Park	Andrew O'Brien
Harden Worhawks	28 – 10	Boomanulla Raiders	Saturday, 22 May, 12:45pm	McLean Oval	Gage Miles
University of Canberra Stars	0 – 50	Goulburn City Bulldogs	Saturday, 22 May, 5:30pm	GIO Stadium	Mark Ryan
Tuggeranong Bushrangers		Bye

==== Round 5 ====
Home	Score	Away	Match information
Home	Score	Away	Date and time	Venue	Referee
Tuggeranong Bushrangers	50 – 0	University of Canberra Stars	Saturday, 29 May, 12:00pm	Greenway Oval	Katherine Nightingale
Harden Worhawks	0 – 34	Queanbeyan United Blues	Saturday, 29 May, 12:45pm	McLean Oval	Michael Bayley
Boomanulla Raiders	0 – 42*	Yass Magpies	Saturday, 29 May, 12:45pm	Boomanulla Oval	N/A
Goulburn City Bulldogs		Bye

==== Round 6 ====
Home	Score	Away	Match information
Home	Score	Away	Date and time	Venue	Referee
University of Canberra Stars	14 – 4	Boomanulla Raiders	Saturday, 5 June, 12:00pm	Raiders Belconnen	Mario Prpic
Yass Magpies	22 – 4	Goulburn City Bulldogs	Saturday, 5 June, 12:00pm	Walker Park	Steven Zorzi
Tuggeranong Bushrangers	46 – 0	Harden Worhawks	Sunday, 6 June, 10:30am	Raiders Belconnen	Andrew O'Brien
Queanbeyan United Blues		Bye

==== Round 7 ====
Home	Score	Away	Match information
Home	Score	Away	Date and time	Venue	Referee
Yass Magpies	6 – 22	Queanbeyan United Blues	Saturday, 19 June, 10:30am	Phillip Oval	Steven Zorzi
Goulburn City Bulldogs	12 – 10	Tuggeranong Bushrangers	Sunday, 20 June, 11:00am	Workers Arena	Aidan Richardson
University of Canberra Stars	0 – 0	Harden Worhawks	Postponed	Raiders Belconnen	N/A
Boomanulla Raiders		Bye

==== Round 8 ====
Home	Score	Away	Match information
Home	Score	Away	Date and time	Venue	Referee
University of Canberra Stars	Washout	Queanbeyan United Blues	Saturday, 26 June, 10:30am	Raiders Belconnen	N/A
Boomanulla Raiders	Washout	Tuggeranong Bushrangers	Saturday, 26 June, 11:30am	Gunning Showground	N/A
Harden Worhawks	Washout	Goulburn City Bulldogs	Saturday, 26 June, 12:45pm	McLean Oval	N/A
Yass Magpies		Bye

==== Round 9 ====
Home	Score	Away	Match information
Home	Score	Away	Date and time	Venue	Referee
Boomanulla Raiders	0 – 46	Yass Magpies	Saturday, 3 July, 11:45am	Gunning Showground	Nathan Gauci
University of Canberra Stars	0 – 36	Goulburn City Bulldogs	Saturday, 3 July, 12:00pm	Mick Sherd Oval	Mario Prpic
Harden Worhawks	Bye	Tuggeranong Bushrangers
Queanbeyan United Blues	Bye

==== Round 10 ====
Home	Score	Away	Match information
Home	Score	Away	Date and time	Venue	Referee
Boomanulla Raiders	0 – 70	Queanbeyan United Blues	Saturday, 10 July, 9:30am	Seiffert Oval	Michael Bayley
Goulburn City Bulldogs	50 – 6	Harden Worhawks	Saturday, 10 July, 10:55am	Workers Arena	Mario Prpic
Yass Magpies	22 – 16	Tuggeranong Bushrangers	Saturday, 10 July, 12:00pm	Walker Park	Andrew O'Brien
University of Canberra Stars		Bye

==== Round 11 ====
Home	Score	Away	Match information
Home	Score	Away	Date and time	Venue	Referee
Tuggeranong Bushrangers	30 – 4	University of Canberra Stars	Saturday, 17 July, 11:00am	Greenway Oval	Michael Bayley
Harden Worhawks	0 – 72	Queanbeyan United Blues	Saturday, 17 July, 12:45pm	McLean Oval	Joseph Lui
Boomanulla Raiders	0 – 48	Goulburn City Bulldogs	Saturday, 17 July, 12:45pm	Keith Tournier Memorial Oval	Mario Prpic
Yass Magpies		Bye

==== Round 12 ====
Home	Score	Away	Match information
Home	Score	Away	Date and time	Venue	Referee
Yass Magpies	Washout	University of Canberra Stars	Saturday, 24 July, 12:00pm	Walker Park	N/A
Queanbeyan United Blues	Washout	Tuggeranong Bushrangers	Saturday, 24 July, 12:00pm	Seiffert Oval	N/A
Harden Worhawks	Bye	Goulburn City Bulldogs
Boomanulla Raiders	Bye

==== Round 13 ====
Home	Score	Away	Match information
Home	Score	Away	Date and time	Venue	Referee
Harden Worhawks	28 – 0	Boomanulla Raiders	Saturday, 31 July, 11:45am	McLean Oval	Eleanor Drury
Tuggeranong Bushrangers	4 – 44	Yass Magpies	Saturday, 31 July, 12:00pm	Greenway Oval	Joseph Lui
Goulburn City Bulldogs	24 – 4	Queanbeyan United Blues	Sunday, 1 August, 11:00am	Workers Arena	Andrew O'Brien
University of Canberra Stars		Bye

==== Round 14 ====
Home	Score	Away	Match information
Home	Score	Away	Date and time	Venue	Referee
Yass Magpies	24 – 6	Queanbeyan United Blues	Saturday, 7 August, 12:00pm	Walker Park	Nathan Gauci
University of Canberra Stars	28 – 6	Boomanulla Raiders	Saturday, 7 August, 12:00pm	Raiders Belconnen	Geordie Doherty
Tuggeranong Bushrangers	42 – 0	Harden Worhawks	Saturday, 7 August, 12:00pm	Greenway Oval	Joseph Lui
Goulburn City Bulldogs		Bye

==== Round 15 ====
Home	Score	Away	Match information
Home	Score	Away	Date and time	Venue	Referee
Queanbeyan United Blues	Cancelled	Boomanulla Raiders	Saturday, 14 August, 12:00pm	Seiffert Oval	N/A
Harden Worhawks	Cancelled	Yass Magpies	Saturday, 14 August, 2:30pm	McLean Oval	N/A
Goulburn City Bulldogs	Cancelled	University of Canberra Stars	Sunday, 15 August, 11:00am	Workers Arena	N/A
Tuggeranong Bushrangers		Bye

==== Round 16 ====
Home	Score	Away	Match information
Home	Score	Away	Date and time	Venue	Referee
University of Canberra Stars	Cancelled	Harden Worhawks	Saturday, 21 August, 12:00pm	Raiders Belconnen	N/A
Boomanulla Raiders	Cancelled	Tuggeranong Bushrangers	Saturday, 21 August, 12:45pm	Boomanulla Oval	N/A
Goulburn City Bulldogs	Cancelled	Yass Magpies	Sunday, 22 August, 11:00am	Workers Arena	N/A
Queanbeyan United Blues		Bye

==== Round 17 ====
Home	Score	Away	Match information
Home	Score	Away	Date and time	Venue	Referee
Yass Magpies	Cancelled	University of Canberra Stars	Saturday, 28 August, 12:00pm	Walker Park	N/A
Tuggeranong Bushrangers	Cancelled	Goulburn City Bulldogs	Saturday, 28 August, 12:00pm	Greenway Oval	N/A
Queanbeyan United Blues	Cancelled	Harden Worhawks	Saturday, 28 August, 12:00pm	Seiffert Oval	N/A
Boomanulla Raiders		Bye

==== Finals series ====
Minor and major semi-finals
1	Goulburn City
2	Yass
3	Queanbeyan United
4	Tuggeranong

Preliminary final
1/2
3/4

Grand final
1/2
1/2/3/4

Home	Score	Away	Match information
Home	Score	Away	Date and time	Venue	Referee
Minor and major semi-finals
Queanbeyan United Blues	Cancelled	Tuggeranong Bushrangers	4/5 September	TBA	TBD
Goulburn City Bulldogs	Cancelled	Yass Magpies	4/5 September	TBA	TBD
Preliminary final
Major SF loser	Cancelled	Minor SF winner	11/12 September	TBA	TBD
Grand final
Major SF winner	Cancelled	PF winner	Sunday, 19 September, 12:00pm	Seiffert Oval	TBD

== Ladies League Tag ==
=== Teams ===
Colours	Club	Home ground(s)	Head coach
	Belconnen United Sharks	NSWRL HQ Bruce	Mark Hankinson
	Goulburn City Bulldogs	Workers Arena	Vaughan Winnel
	Gungahlin Bulls	Gungahlin Enclosed Oval	Darren Grocott
	Queanbeyan Kangaroos	Seears Workwear Oval	TBA
	Queanbeyan United Blues	Seiffert Oval	Bryce Lee, Brent Lamb
	Tuggeranong Bushrangers	Greenway Oval	Greg Smith
	West Belconnen Warriors	Raiders Belconnen	Darren Tredgold
	Woden Valley Rams	Phillip Oval	Bryce Lloyd

=== Ladder ===
Pos	Team	Pld	W	D	L	PF	PA	PD	Pts
1	West Belconnen Warriors LLT	10	10	0	0	366	66	+300	28
2	Gungahlin Bulls LLT	12	9	0	3	318	104	+214	22
3	Goulburn City Bulldogs LLT	12	9	0	3	276	94	+182	22
4	Woden Valley Rams LLT	11	6	0	5	306	118	+188	18
5	Belconnen United Sharks LLT	10	4	0	6	170	97	+73	16
6	Queanbeyan United Blues LLT	11	3	0	8	143	234	−91	12
7	Tuggeranong Bushrangers LLT	11	3	0	8	70	382	−312	12
8	Queanbeyan Kangaroos LLT	11	0	0	11	30	584	−554	6

Updated to match(es) played on 8 August. Source:
Rules for classification: 1) points; 2) point difference; 3) points scored

==== Ladder progression ====
- Numbers highlighted in green indicate that the team finished the round inside the top 4.
- Numbers highlighted in blue indicate that the team finished first on the ladder in that round.
- Numbers highlighted in red indicate that the team finished last place on the ladder in that round.
- Underlined numbers indicate that the team had a bye during that round.

Pos	Team	1	2	3	4	5	6	7	8	9	10	11	12	13	14	15	16	17	18
1	West Belconnen Warriors LLT	2	4	6	8	10	12	14	16	18	20	22	24	24	26	28	28	28	28
2	Gungahlin Bulls LLT	2	4	4	6	8	10	12	14	16	18	20	20	20	20	22	22	22	22
3	Goulburn City Bulldogs LLT	0	2	4	6	6	8	10	12	14	14	16	18	18	20	22	22	22	22
4	Woden Valley Rams LLT	0	2	4	4	6	8	8	10	12	12	12	14	14	16	18	18	18	18
5	Belconnen United Sharks LLT	0	0	2	4	6	6	8	8	8	10	12	14	14	16	16	16	16	16
6	Queanbeyan United Blues LLT	2	4	4	4	6	6	6	8	8	8	8	10	10	10	12	12	12	12
7	Tuggeranong Bushrangers LLT	2	2	4	6	6	8	8	8	8	10	10	10	10	12	12	12	12	12
8	Queanbeyan Kangaroos LLT	0	0	0	0	0	0	2	2	4	4	6	6	6	6	6	6	6	6

=== Season results ===
==== Round 1 ====
Home	Score	Away	Match information
Home	Score	Away	Date and time	Venue	Referee
Tuggeranong Bushrangers	28 – 12	Queanbeyan Kangaroos	Saturday, 10 April, 12:00pm	Greenway Oval	William Perrott
Queanbeyan United Blues	15 – 14	Belconnen United Sharks	Saturday, 10 April, 12:00pm	Seiffert Oval	Michael Bayley
Gungahlin Bulls	16 – 14	Woden Valley Rams	Saturday, 10 April, 12:00pm	Gungahlin Enclosed Oval	Jessica Charman
Goulburn City Bulldogs	8 – 20	West Belconnen Warriors	Sunday, 11 April, 12:00pm	Workers Arena	Heather Hall

==== Round 2 ====
Home	Score	Away	Match information
Home	Score	Away	Date and time	Venue	Referee
Woden Valley Rams	48 – 6	Tuggeranong Bushrangers	Saturday, 17 April, 12:00pm	Phillip Oval	William Perrott
Belconnen United Sharks	4 – 24	Gungahlin Bulls	Saturday, 17 April, 12:00pm	NSWRL HQ Bruce	Tristan Brooker
Goulburn City Bulldogs	76 – 0	Queanbeyan Kangaroos	Sunday, 18 April, 12:00pm	Workers Arena	Shannon Castle
West Belconnen Warriors	Bye	Queanbeyan United Blues

==== Round 3 ====
Home	Score	Away	Match information
Home	Score	Away	Date and time	Venue	Referee
Woden Valley Rams	70 – 0	Queanbeyan Kangaroos	Saturday, 24 April, 12:00pm	Phillip Oval	Katherine Nightingale
Queanbeyan United Blues	8 – 28	Goulburn City Bulldogs	Saturday, 24 April, 12:00pm	Seiffert Oval	William Perrott
Gungahlin Bulls	16 – 24	West Belconnen Warriors	Saturday, 24 April, 12:00pm	Gungahlin Enclosed Oval	Jessica Charman
Belconnen United Sharks	Bye	Tuggeranong Bushrangers

==== Round 4 ====
Home	Score	Away	Match information
Home	Score	Away	Date and time	Venue	Referee
West Belconnen Warriors	30 – 4	Woden Valley Rams	Saturday, 1 May, 10:45am	Raiders Belconnen	Heather Hall
Tuggeranong Bushrangers	12 – 10	Queanbeyan United Blues	Saturday, 1 May, 12:00pm	Greenway Oval	William Perrott
Queanbeyan Kangaroos	0 – 46	Belconnen United Sharks	Saturday, 1 May, 12:00pm	Seears Workwear Oval	Christopher Nightingale
Goulburn City Bulldogs	Bye	Gungahlin Bulls

==== Round 5 ====
Home	Score	Away	Match information
Home	Score	Away	Date and time	Venue	Referee
Queanbeyan United Blues	28 – 0	Queanbeyan Kangaroos	Saturday, 8 May, 12:00pm	Seiffert Oval	Steven Zorzi
Belconnen United Sharks	20 – 0	Tuggeranong Bushrangers	Saturday, 8 May, 12:00pm	NSWRL HQ Bruce	William Perrott
Goulburn City Bulldogs	16 – 20	Gungahlin Bulls	Sunday, 9 May, 12:00pm	Workers Arena	Heather Hall
Woden Valley Rams	Bye	West Belconnen Warriors

==== Round 6 ====
Home	Score	Away	Match information
Home	Score	Away	Date and time	Venue	Referee
Queanbeyan Kangaroos	0 – 78	West Belconnen Warriors	Saturday, 22 May, 12:00pm	Seears Workwear Oval	William Perrott
Gungahlin Bulls	32 – 6	Queanbeyan United Blues	Saturday, 22 May, 12:00pm	Gungahlin Enclosed Oval	Steven Zorzi
Belconnen United Sharks	0 – 6	Goulburn City Bulldogs	Saturday, 22 May, 12:00pm	NSWRL HQ Bruce	Jessica Charman
Tuggeranong Bushrangers	Bye	Woden Valley Rams

==== Round 7 ====
Home	Score	Away	Match information
Home	Score	Away	Date and time	Venue	Referee
Tuggeranong Bushrangers	0 – 52	Gungahlin Bulls	Saturday, 29 May, 10:30am	Greenway Oval	Heather Hall
Woden Valley Rams	6 – 14	Goulburn City Bulldogs	Saturday, 29 May, 12:00pm	Phillip Oval	Jessica Charman
West Belconnen Warriors	48 – 4	Queanbeyan United Blues	Saturday, 29 May, 12:00pm	Raiders Belconnen	William Perrott
Queanbeyan Kangaroos	Bye	Belconnen United Sharks

==== Round 8 ====
Home	Score	Away	Match information
Home	Score	Away	Date and time	Venue	Referee
Gungahlin Bulls	76 – 6	Queanbeyan Kangaroos	Saturday, 5 June, 12:00pm	Gungahlin Enclosed Oval	William Perrott
Belconnen United Sharks	4 – 6	Woden Valley Rams	Saturday, 5 June, 12:00pm	NSWRL HQ Bruce	Jessica Charman
West Belconnen Warriors	70 – 0	Tuggeranong Bushrangers	Sunday, 6 June, 12:00pm	Raiders Belconnen	Heather Hall
Queanbeyan United Blues	Bye	Goulburn City Bulldogs

==== Round 9 ====
Home	Score	Away	Match information
Home	Score	Away	Date and time	Venue	Referee
Woden Valley Rams	20 – 6	Queanbeyan United Blues	Saturday, 19 June, 12:00pm	Phillip Oval	William Perrott
Goulburn City Bulldogs	22 – 4	Tuggeranong Bushrangers	Sunday, 20 June, 10:00am	Workers Arena	Jessica Charman
West Belconnen Warriors	26 – 12	Belconnen United Sharks	Sunday, 20 June, 12:00pm	Raiders Belconnen	Heather Hall
Gungahlin Bulls	Bye	Queanbeyan Kangaroos

==== Round 10 ====
Home	Score	Away	Match information
Home	Score	Away	Date and time	Venue	Referee
Woden Valley Rams	8 – 22	Gungahlin Bulls	Saturday, 3 July, 11:00am	Phillip Oval	William Perrott
West Belconnen Warriors	24 – 16	Goulburn City Bulldogs	Saturday, 3 July, 12:00pm	Raiders Belconnen	Jessica Charman
Queanbeyan Kangaroos	12 – 14	Tuggeranong Bushrangers	Saturday, 3 July, 12:00pm	Seears Workwear Oval	Joseph Lui
Belconnen United Sharks	32 – 12	Queanbeyan United Blues	Saturday, 3 July, 12:00pm	NSWRL HQ Bruce	Thomas Rynehart

==== Round 11 ====
Home	Score	Away	Match information
Home	Score	Away	Date and time	Venue	Referee
Queanbeyan United Blues	6 – 32	West Belconnen Warriors	Saturday, 10 July, 12:00pm	Seiffert Oval	Joseph Lui
Gungahlin Bulls	52 – 0	Tuggeranong Bushrangers	Saturday, 10 July, 12:00pm	Gungahlin Enclosed Oval	William Perrott
Goulburn City Bulldogs	14 – 12	Woden Valley Rams	Saturday, 10 July, 12:10pm	Workers Arena	Jessica Charman
Queanbeyan Kangaroos	Bye	Belconnen United Sharks

==== Round 12 ====
Home	Score	Away	Match information
Home	Score	Away	Date and time	Venue	Referee
Tuggeranong Bushrangers	0 – 38	Belconnen United Sharks	Saturday, 17 July, 9:45am	Greenway Oval	William Perrott
Gungahlin Bulls	0 – 12	Goulburn City Bulldogs	Saturday, 17 July, 10:45am	Gungahlin Enclosed Oval	Jessica Charman
Queanbeyan Kangaroos	0 – 48	Queanbeyan United Blues	Saturday, 17 July, 12:00pm	Seears Workwear Oval	Scott Hall
Woden Valley Rams	Bye	West Belconnen Warriors

==== Round 13 ====
Home	Score	Away	Match information
Home	Score	Away	Date and time	Venue	Referee
Woden Valley Rams	Washout	West Belconnen Warriors	Saturday, 24 July, 12:00pm	Phillip Oval	N/A
Queanbeyan United Blues	Washout	Tuggeranong Bushrangers	Saturday, 24 July, 12:00pm	Seiffert Oval	N/A
Belconnen United Sharks	Washout	Queanbeyan Kangaroos	Saturday, 24 July, 12:00pm	NSWRL HQ Bruce	N/A
Goulburn City Bulldogs	Bye	Gungahlin Bulls

==== Round 14 ====
Home	Score	Away	Match information
Home	Score	Away	Date and time	Venue	Referee
Queanbeyan Kangaroos	0 – 72	Woden Valley Rams	Saturday, 31 July, 12:00pm	Seears Workwear Oval	Jason Severs
Goulburn City Bulldogs	16 – 0	Queanbeyan United Blues	Sunday, 1 August, 10:00am	Workers Arena	Nathan Gauci
West Belconnen Warriors	14 – 0	Gungahlin Bulls	Sunday, 1 August, 11:15am	North Kaleen Oval	Liam Richardson
Belconnen United Sharks	Bye	Tuggeranong Bushrangers

==== Round 15 ====
Home	Score	Away	Match information
Home	Score	Away	Date and time	Venue	Referee
Tuggeranong Bushrangers	6 – 46	Woden Valley Rams	Saturday, 7 August, 12:00pm	Greenway Oval	Heather Hall
Queanbeyan Kangaroos	0 – 48	Goulburn City Bulldogs	Saturday, 7 August, 12:00pm	Seears Workwear Oval	Michael Lean
Gungahlin Bulls	8 – 0	Belconnen United Sharks	Sunday, 8 August, 10:45am	Gungahlin Enclosed Oval	Jessica Charman
West Belconnen Warriors	Bye	Queanbeyan United Blues

==== Round 16 ====
Home	Score	Away	Match information
Home	Score	Away	Date and time	Venue	Referee
West Belconnen Warriors	Cancelled	Queanbeyan Kangaroos	Saturday, 14 August, 12:00pm	Raiders Belconnen	N/A
Queanbeyan United Blues	Cancelled	Gungahlin Bulls	Saturday, 14 August, 12:00pm	Seiffert Oval	N/A
Goulburn City Bulldogs	Cancelled	Belconnen United Sharks	Sunday, 15 August, 12:00pm	Workers Arena	N/A
Tuggeranong Bushrangers	Bye	Woden Valley Rams

==== Round 17 ====
Home	Score	Away	Match information
Home	Score	Away	Date and time	Venue	Referee
Woden Valley Rams	Cancelled	Belconnen United Sharks	Saturday, 21 August, 12:00pm	Phillip Oval	N/A
Tuggeranong Bushrangers	Cancelled	West Belconnen Warriors	Saturday, 21 August, 12:00pm	Greenway Oval	N/A
Queanbeyan Kangaroos	Cancelled	Gungahlin Bulls	Saturday, 21 August, 12:00pm	Seears Workwear Oval	N/A
Queanbeyan United Blues	Bye	Goulburn City Bulldogs

==== Round 18 ====
Home	Score	Away	Match information
Home	Score	Away	Date and time	Venue	Referee
Tuggeranong Bushrangers	Cancelled	Goulburn City Bulldogs	Saturday, 28 August, 12:00pm	Greenway Oval	N/A
Queanbeyan United Blues	Cancelled	Woden Valley Rams	Saturday, 28 August, 12:00pm	Seiffert Oval	N/A
Belconnen United Sharks	Cancelled	West Belconnen Warriors	Saturday, 28 August, 12:00pm	NSWRL HQ Bruce	N/A
Gungahlin Bulls	Bye	Queanbeyan Kangaroos

==== Finals series ====
Minor and major semi-finals
1	West Belconnen
2	Gungahlin
3	Goulburn City
4	Woden Valley

Preliminary final
1/2
3/4

Grand final
1/2
1/2/3/4

Home	Score	Away	Match information
Home	Score	Away	Date and time	Venue	Referee
Minor and major semi-finals
Goulburn City Bulldogs	Cancelled	Woden Valley Rams	4/5 September	TBA	TBD
West Belconnen Warriors	Cancelled	Gungahlin Bulls	4/5 September	TBA	TBD
Preliminary final
Major SF loser	Cancelled	Minor SF winner	11/12 September	TBA	TBD
Grand final
Major SF winner	Cancelled	PF winner	Sunday, 19 September, TBA	Seiffert Oval	TBD

== Ladies League Tag Second Division ==
=== Teams ===
Colours	Club	Home ground(s)	Head coach
	Binalong Jersey Girls	Binalong Recreation Ground	Craig Phillis
	Boorowa Roverettes	Boorowa Showground	Byron Campbell
	Bungendore Tigerettes	Mick Sherd Oval	Dan Woodford
	Burrangong Bears	Cranfield Oval	James Sheehan
	Cootamundra Bullettes	Les Boyd Oval	John Murray
	Crookwell She Devils	Crookwell Memorial Oval	Patrick Lenane
	Gunning Rooettes	Boomanulla Oval, Gunning Showground	N/A
	Harden Hawkettes	McLean Oval	Jason Pollard
	North Canberra Bears	Kaleen Enclosed Oval	Kieran Bell
	University of Canberra Stars	Raiders Belconnen	Bulou Baravilala

=== Ladder ===
Pos	Team	Pld	W	D	L	PF	PA	PD	Pts
1	Harden Hawkettes	12	11	1	0	490	10	+480	23
2	Cootamundra Bullettes	12	10	0	2	350	116	+234	20
3	Boorowa Roverettes	12	9	0	3	258	130	+128	18
4	Crookwell She Devils	12	6	2	4	309	180	+129	14
5	North Canberra Bears LLT	12	7	0	5	204	152	+52	14
6	Bungendore Tigerettes	12	5	2	5	270	116	+154	12
7	Gunning Rooettes	12	5	0	7	86	252	−166	10
8	University of Canberra Stars LLT	12	2	1	9	66	251	−185	5
9	Binalong Jersey Girls	12	1	1	10	56	314	−258	3
10	Burrangong Bears LLT	12	0	1	11	16	584	−568	1

Updated to match(es) played on 7 August. Source:
Rules for classification: 1) points; 2) point difference; 3) points scored

==== Ladder progression ====
- Numbers highlighted in green indicate that the team finished the round inside the top 5.
- Numbers highlighted in blue indicate that the team finished first on the ladder in that round.
- Numbers highlighted in red indicate that the team finished last place on the ladder in that round.

Pos	Team	1	2	3	4	5	6	7	8	9	10	11	12	13	14	15
1	Harden Hawkettes	2	4	6	8	10	23	22	14	16	18	18	20	22	22	23
2	Cootamundra Bullettes	2	4	6	8	10	12	20	14	16	18	18	18	20	20	20
3	Boorowa Roverettes	2	4	6	8	8	10	18	14	14	16	16	18	18	18	18
4	Crookwell She Devils	1	1	1	1	3	5	14	7	9	9	9	11	12	14	14
5	North Canberra Bears LLT	0	0	2	4	6	6	14	8	10	10	10	12	14	14	14
6	Bungendore Tigerettes	1	3	3	5	5	7	12	9	9	9	9	11	12	12	12
7	Gunning Rooettes	2	2	2	2	4	4	10	6	6	8	8	8	10	10	10
8	University of Canberra Stars LLT	0	2	2	2	2	5	4	2	4	4	4	4	4	4	5
9	Binalong Jersey Girls	0	0	2	2	2	2	2	2	2	3	2	2	2	2	3
10	Burrangong Bears LLT	0	0	0	0	0	0	0	0	0	1	0	0	0	0	1

=== Season results ===
==== Round 1 ====
Home	Score	Away	Match information
Home	Score	Away	Date and time	Venue	Referee
Boorowa Roverettes	32 – 0	University of Canberra Stars	Friday, 30 April, 7:00pm	Boorowa Showground	Noah Dal-Molin
Binalong Jersey Girls	0 – 40	Cootamundra Bullettes	Saturday, 1 May, 12:45pm	Binalong Recreation Ground	Jessica Charman
North Canberra Bears	0 – 42	Harden Hawkettes	Saturday, 1 May, 1:15pm	Kaleen Enclosed Oval	Michael Bayley
Crookwell She Devils	12 – 12	Bungendore Tigerettes	Saturday, 1 May, 1:20pm	Crookwell Memorial Oval	Liam Richardson
Gunning Rooettes	24 – 0	Burrangong Bears	Saturday, 1 May, 2:30pm	Gunning Showground	Mario Prpic

==== Round 2 ====
Home	Score	Away	Match information
Home	Score	Away	Date and time	Venue	Referee
Gunning Rooettes	0 – 32	Bungendore Tigerettes	Saturday, 8 May, 11:30am	Boomanulla Oval	Jason Severs
Binalong Jersey Girls	0 – 68	Harden Hawkettes	Saturday, 8 May, 12:45pm	Binalong Recreation Ground	Geordie Doherty
Boorowa Roverettes	16 – 12	Crookwell She Devils	Saturday, 8 May, 1:15pm	Boorowa Showground	Luke Barrow
University of Canberra Stars	24 – 0	Burrangong Bears	Saturday, 8 May, 1:20pm	Raiders Belconnen	Joseph Lui
Cootamundra Bullettes	22 – 12	North Canberra Bears	Saturday, 8 May, 1:30pm	Les Boyd Oval	David Charman

==== Round 3 ====
Home	Score	Away	Match information
Home	Score	Away	Date and time	Venue	Referee
Burrangong Bears	0 – 28	Binalong Jersey Girls	Saturday, 22 May, 12:40pm	Cranfield Oval	Jason Severs
Bungendore Tigerettes	4 – 8	Boorowa Roverettes	Saturday, 22 May, 1:15pm	Mick Sherd Oval	Katherine Nightingale
North Canberra Bears	16 – 4	University of Canberra Stars	Saturday, 22 May, 1:20pm	Kaleen Enclosed Oval	Heather Hall
Crookwell She Devils	18 – 34	Cootamundra Bullettes	Saturday, 22 May, 1:30pm	Crookwell Memorial Oval	Jack Black
Harden Hawkettes	40 – 0	Gunning Rooettes	Saturday, 22 May, 2:00pm	McLean Oval	David Charman

==== Round 4 ====
Home	Score	Away	Match information
Home	Score	Away	Date and time	Venue	Referee
Gunning Rooettes	6 – 24	North Canberra Bears	Saturday, 29 May, 11:30am	Boomanulla Oval	Christopher Nightingale
Binalong Jersey Girls	0 – 26	Bungendore Tigerettes	Saturday, 29 May, 12:45pm	Binalong Recreation Ground	Jack Black
Boorowa Roverettes	58 – 0	Burrangong Bears	Saturday, 29 May, 1:15pm	Boorowa Showground	Aidan Richardson
Cootamundra Bullettes	48 – 0	University of Canberra Stars	Saturday, 29 May, 1:30pm	Les Boyd Oval	Jason Severs
Harden Hawkettes	54 – 6	Crookwell She Devils	Saturday, 29 May, 2:00pm	McLean Oval	Luke Barrow

==== Round 5 ====
Home	Score	Away	Match information
Home	Score	Away	Date and time	Venue	Referee
University of Canberra Stars	8 – 14	Gunning Rooettes	Saturday, 5 June, 12:00pm	Raiders Belconnen	Mario Prpic
Burrangong Bears	0 – 96	Harden Hawkettes	Saturday, 5 June, 12:40pm	Cranfield Oval	Noah Dal Molin
Binalong Jersey Girls	4 – 32	Crookwell She Devils	Saturday, 5 June, 12:45pm	Binalong Recreation Ground	Michael Bayley
North Canberra Bears	14 – 10	Bungendore Tigerettes	Saturday, 5 June, 1:20pm	Kaleen Enclosed Oval	Christopher Nightingale
Cootamundra Bullettes	26 – 0	Boorowa Roverettes	Saturday, 5 June, 1:30pm	Les Boyd Oval	David Charman

==== Round 6 ====
Home	Score	Away	Match information
Home	Score	Away	Date and time	Venue	Referee
Boorowa Roverettes	24 – 0	Binalong Jersey Girls	Saturday, 19 June, 1:15pm	Boorowa Showground	Andrew Wheeler
Crookwell She Devils	24 – 8	North Canberra Bears	Saturday, 19 June, 1:15pm	Crookwell Memorial Oval	Benjamin Munroe
Bungendore Tigerettes	82 – 0	Burrangong Bears	Saturday, 19 June, 1:20pm	Mick Sherd Oval	Christopher Nightingale
Cootamundra Bullettes	50 – 0	Gunning Rooettes	Saturday, 19 June, 1:30pm	Les Boyd Oval	Jack Black
University of Canberra Stars	0 – 0	Harden Hawkettes	Wednesday, 18 August, 6:30pm	Raiders Belconnen	N/A

==== Round 7 ====
Home	Score	Away	Match information
Home	Score	Away	Date and time	Venue	Referee
Burrangong Bears	0 – 64	Cootamundra Bullettes	Saturday, 26 June, 12:40pm	Cranfield Oval	Noah Dal Molin
Boorowa Roverettes	14 – 6	North Canberra Bears	Saturday, 26 June, 1:15pm	Boorowa Showground	Heather Hall
Harden Hawkettes	28 – 0	Bungendore Tigerettes	Saturday, 26 June, 2:00pm	McLean Oval	Jessica Charman
Gunning Rooettes	6 – 4	Binalong Jersey Girls	Saturday, 26 June, 2:30pm	Gunning Showground	Jack Black
University of Canberra Stars	0 – 25*	Crookwell She Devils	Wednesday, 11 August, 7:30pm	NSWRL HQ Bruce	N/A

==== Round 8 ====
Home	Score	Away	Match information
Home	Score	Away	Date and time	Venue	Referee
Burrangong Bears	6 – 60	Crookwell She Devils	Saturday, 3 July, 12:40pm	Cranfield Oval	Noah Dal Molin
Binalong Jersey Girls	6 – 22	North Canberra Bears	Saturday, 3 July, 12:45pm	Binalong Recreation Ground	Tristan Brooker
Gunning Rooettes	0 – 32	Boorowa Roverettes	Saturday, 3 July, 1:00pm	Gunning Showground	James Gould
Bungendore Tigerettes	22 – 0	University of Canberra Stars	Saturday, 3 July, 1:20pm	Mick Sherd Oval	Mario Prpic
Cootamundra Bullettes	0 – 38	Harden Hawkettes	Saturday, 3 July, 1:45pm	Les Boyd Oval	Gage Miles

==== Round 9 ====
Home	Score	Away	Match information
Home	Score	Away	Date and time	Venue	Referee
University of Canberra Stars	20 – 10	Binalong Jersey Girls	Saturday, 10 July, 12:00pm	Raiders Belconnen	Thomas Rynehart
Gunning Rooettes	0 – 38	Crookwell She Devils	Saturday, 10 July, 12:45pm	Crookwell Memorial Oval	Nathan Gauci
North Canberra Bears	68 – 0	Burrangong Bears	Saturday, 10 July, 1:20pm	Kaleen Enclosed Oval	Christopher Nightingale
Cootamundra Bullettes	14 – 0	Bungendore Tigerettes	Saturday, 10 July, 1:30pm	Les Boyd Oval	David Charman
Harden Hawkettes	36 – 4	Boorowa Roverettes	Saturday, 10 July, 2:00pm	McLean Oval	Jack Black

==== Round 10 ====
Home	Score	Away	Match information
Home	Score	Away	Date and time	Venue	Referee
Gunning Rooettes	8 – 0	University of Canberra Stars	Saturday, 17 July, 11:30am	Keith Tournier Memorial Oval	Thomas Rynehart
Boorowa Roverettes	12 – 0	Bungendore Tigerettes	Saturday, 17 July, 1:15pm	Boorowa Showground	Liam Richardson
Cootamundra Bullettes	20 – 16	Crookwell She Devils	Saturday, 17 July, 1:45pm	Les Boyd Oval	Nathan Gauci
Harden Hawkettes	14 – 0	North Canberra Bears	Saturday, 17 July, 2:00pm	McLean Oval	Joseph Lui
Binalong Jersey Girls	0 – 0	Burrangong Bears	Postponed	Binalong Recreation Ground	N/A

==== Round 11 ====
Home	Score	Away	Match information
Home	Score	Away	Date and time	Venue	Referee
Burrangong Bears	Washout	University of Canberra Stars	Saturday, 24 July, 12:40pm	Cranfield Oval	N/A
Binalong Jersey Girls	Washout	Boorowa Roverettes	Saturday, 24 July, 12:45pm	Binalong Recreation Ground	N/A
North Canberra Bears	Washout	Cootamundra Bullettes	Saturday, 24 July, 1:20pm	Kaleen Enclosed Oval	N/A
Bungendore Tigerettes	Washout	Gunning Rooettes	Saturday, 24 July, 1:20pm	Mick Sherd Oval	N/A
Crookwell She Devils	Washout	Harden Hawkettes	Saturday, 24 July, 2:00pm	Crookwell Memorial Oval	N/A

==== Round 12 ====
Home	Score	Away	Match information
Home	Score	Away	Date and time	Venue	Referee
University of Canberra Stars	6 – 60	Bungendore Tigerettes	Saturday, 31 July, 12:00pm	Mick Sherd Oval	Jessica Charman
Burrangong Bears	4 – 58	Boorowa Roverettes	Saturday, 31 July, 12:40pm	Cranfield Oval	Brock Sing
Harden Hawkettes	32 – 0	Cootamundra Bullettes	Saturday, 31 July, 1:00pm	McLean Oval	Eleanor Drury
Crookwell She Devils	44 – 4	Binalong Jersey Girls	Saturday, 31 July, 1:15pm	Crookwell Memorial Oval	William Perrott
North Canberra Bears	18 – 6	Gunning Rooettes	Saturday, 31 July, 1:20pm	Kaleen Enclosed Oval	Heather Hall

==== Round 13 ====
Home	Score	Away	Match information
Home	Score	Away	Date and time	Venue	Referee
University of Canberra Stars	4 – 16	North Canberra Bears	Saturday, 7 August, 12:00pm	Raiders Belconnen	Thomas Rynehart
Burrangong Bears	6 – 22	Gunning Rooettes	Saturday, 7 August, 12:40pm	Cranfield Oval	Noah Dal Molin
Boorowa Roverettes	0 – 42	Harden Hawkettes	Saturday, 7 August, 1:15pm	Boorowa Showground	Liam Richardson
Bungendore Tigerettes	22 – 22	Crookwell She Devils	Saturday, 7 August, 1:20pm	Mick Sherd Oval	William Perrott
Cootamundra Bullettes	32 – 0	Binalong Jersey Girls	Saturday, 7 August, 1:30pm	Les Boyd Oval	Jessica Charman

==== Round 14 ====
Home	Score	Away	Match information
Home	Score	Away	Date and time	Venue	Referee
Bungendore Tigerettes	Cancelled	North Canberra Bears	Saturday, 14 August, 12:00pm	Mick Sherd Oval	N/A
Binalong Jersey Girls	Cancelled	University of Canberra Stars	Saturday, 14 August, 12:45pm	Binalong Recreation Ground	N/A
Boorowa Roverettes	Cancelled	Cootamundra Bullettes	Saturday, 14 August, 1:15pm	Boorowa Showground	N/A
Harden Hawkettes	Cancelled	Burrangong Bears	Saturday, 14 August, 3:40pm	McLean Oval	N/A
Crookwell She Devils	Cancelled	Gunning Rooettes	Sunday, 15 August, 12:45pm	Gunning Showground	N/A

==== Round 15 ====
Home	Score	Away	Match information
Home	Score	Away	Date and time	Venue	Referee
University of Canberra Stars	Cancelled	Boorowa Roverettes	Saturday, 21 August, 12:00pm	Raiders Belconnen	N/A
North Canberra Bears	Cancelled	Binalong Jersey Girls	Saturday, 21 August, 1:20pm	Kaleen Enclosed Oval	N/A
Bungendore Tigerettes	Cancelled	Harden Hawkettes	Saturday, 21 August, 1:20pm	Mick Sherd Oval	N/A
Gunning Rooettes	Cancelled	Cootamundra Bullettes	Saturday, 21 August, 2:30pm	Gunning Showground	N/A
Crookwell She Devils	Cancelled	Burrangong Bears	Sunday, 22 August, 1:15pm	Crookwell Memorial Oval	N/A

==== Finals series ====
Qualifying/elimination finals
2	Cootamundra
3	Boorowa
4	Crookwell
5	North Canberra

Minor and major semi-finals
1	Harden
2	Cootamundra
3	Boorowa
4	Crookwell

Preliminary final
1/2
2/3/4

Grand final
1/2
1/2/3/4

Home	Score	Away	Match information
Home	Score	Away	Date and time	Venue	Referee
Qualifying/elimination finals
Cootamundra Bullettes	Cancelled	Boorowa Roverettes	28/29 August	TBD	N/A
Crookwell She Devils	Cancelled	North Canberra Bears	28/29 August	TBD	N/A
Minor and major semi-finals
Harden Hawkettes	Cancelled	Cootamundra Bullettes	4/5 September	TBD	TBD
Boorowa Roverettes	Cancelled	Crookwell She Devils	4/5 September	TBD	TBD
Preliminary final
Major SF loser	Cancelled	Minor SF winner	11/12 September	TBD	TBD
Grand final
Major SF winner	Cancelled	PF winner	18/19 September	TBD	TBD
