= 2017 Canberra Rugby League =

2017 Canberra Raiders Cup
- Teams: 9
- Premiers: Queanbeyan United Blues (21st title)
- Minor premiers: Queanbeyan United Blues
- Wooden spoon: Belconnen United Sharks
- Matches played: 72
- Points scored: 3,824
- Top points scorer: Brent Crisp (186)
- Player of the year: Brent Crisp
- Top try-scorer: Brent Crisp (16)

The 2017 Canberra Raiders Cup will be the 20th season of the cup, and the 94th season of domestic rugby league in Canberra. The 2017 Canberra Raiders Cup will consist of 18 regular season rounds that will begin on 1 April and end on 13 August. There will be 3 playoff rounds, beginning on 19 August with the major semi-final, and ending on 3 September with the grand final.

== Teams ==
9 Teams will compete in the first grade competition in 2017.

Colours	Team	Home Ground	Coach(s)	Captain(s)
	Belconnen United Sharks	O'Connor	Scott Logan	
	Goulburn Workers Bulldogs	Workers Arena	Michael Picker	Michael Picker
	Gungahlin Bulls	Gungahlin Enclosed Oval	Lincoln Withers David Howell	Lincoln Withers
	Queanbeyan United Blues	Seiffert Oval	Terry Campese	Terry Campese
	Queanbeyan Kangaroos	Seears Workwear Oval	Aaron Gorrell	Aaron Gorrell
	Tuggeranong Bushrangers	Greenway Oval	Justin Giteau	Josh Mitchell
	West Belconnen Warriors	Raiders Belconnen	Troy Thompson Adam Peters	Ryan McQueen
	Woden Valley Rams	Phillip District	Ash Barnes	Steve Ferry
	Yass Magpies	Walker Park	Steve Naughton Scott Naughton	Steve Naughton Scott Naughton

== Venues ==
=== Australian Capital Territory ===
Belconnen	Belconnen	Gungahlin	Tuggeranong	Woden Valley
O'Connor	Raiders Belconnen	Gungahlin Enclosed Oval	Greenway Oval	Phillip District
2017 Canberra Rugby League is located in Australian Capital Territory

=== New South Wales ===
Goulburn	Queanbeyan	Queanbeyan	Yass
Workers Arena	Seears Workwear Oval	Seiffert Oval	Walker Park
		Capacity: 15,000	
2017 Canberra Rugby League is located in New South Wales

== Ladder ==
=== First Grade ===
Pos	Team	Pld	W	D	L	B	PF	PA	PD	Pts
1	Queanbeyan United Blues	16	14	0	2	2	572	281	291	32
2	Queanbeyan Kangaroos	16	12	0	4	2	621	300	321	28
3	Yass Magpies	16	9	1	6	2	417	351	64	23
4	Tuggeranong Bushrangers	16	8	2	6	2	472	364	108	22
5	West Belconnen Warriors	16	9	0	7	2	393	368	25	22
6	Goulburn Workers Bulldogs	16	7	0	9	2	402	493	-89	18
7	Woden Valley Rams	16	5	3	8	2	353	419	-66	17
8	Gungahlin Bulls	16	4	0	12	2	350	512	-162	12
9	Belconnen United Sharks	16	1	0	15	2	242	730	-478	6

- Teams highlighted in green have qualified for the finals
- The team highlighted in blue have clinched the minor premiership
- The team highlighted in red have clinched the wooden spoon

== First Grade Season results ==
=== Round 1 ===
	First Grade
Saturday, 1 April (2:00 pm)	Gungahlin 24	def.	12 West Belconnen	Gungahlin Enclosed Oval
Saturday, 1 April (2:00 pm)	Belconnen United 6	def. by	68 Queanbeyan United	O'Connor
Sunday, 2 April (2:00 pm)	Goulburn 22	def. by	23 Woden	Workers Arena
Sunday, 2 April (3:00 pm)	Queanbeyan 32	def.	16 Tuggeranong	Seears Workwear Oval
	Bye; Yass

=== Round 2 ===
	First Grade
Saturday, 8 April (3:00 pm)	Tuggeranong 34	def.	8 Gungahlin	Greenway Oval
Saturday, 8 April (3:00 pm)	West Belconnen 28	def.	12 Goulburn	Raiders Belconnen
Saturday, 8 April (3:00 pm)	Queanbeyan United 36	def.	26 Queanbeyan	Seiffert Oval
Saturday, 8 April (3:00 pm)	Yass 58	def.	10 Belconnen United	Walker Park
	Bye; Woden

=== Round 3 ===
	First Grade
Saturday, 22 April (3:00 pm)	Belconnen United 22	def. by	26 Woden	O'Connor
Saturday, 22 April (3:00 pm)	West Belconnen 14	def. by	18 Yass	Raiders Belconnen
Saturday, 22 April (3:00 pm)	Queanbeyan 32	def.	8 Gungahlin	Seears Workwear Oval
Saturday, 22 April (3:00 pm)	Queanbeyan United 44	def.	18 Goulburn	Seiffert Oval
	Bye; Tuggeranong

=== Round 4 ===
	First Grade
Saturday, 29 April (3:00 pm)	Gungahlin 18	def. by	34 Queanbeyan United	Gungahlin Enclosed Oval
Saturday, 29 April (3:00 pm)	Queanbeyan 50	def.	10 Belconnen United	Seears Workwear Oval
Sunday, 30 April (2:00 pm)	Goulburn 30	def.	22 Tuggeranong	Workers Arena
Sunday, 30 April (3:00 pm)	Woden 24	drew with	24 Yass	Phillip District
	Bye; West Belconnen

=== Round 5 ===
	First Grade
Saturday, 6 May (3:00 pm)	Belconnen United 18	def. by	36 Gungahlin	O'Connor
Saturday, 6 May (3:00 pm)	Woden 22	def. by	30 West Belconnen	Phillip District
Saturday, 6 May (3:00 pm)	Yass 16	def. by	26 Tuggeranong	Walker Park
Sunday, 7 May (2:00 pm)	Goulburn 8	def. by	58 Queanbeyan	Workers Arena
	Bye; Queanbeyan United

=== Round 6 ===
	First Grade
Saturday, 13 May (3:00 pm)	Tuggeranong 16	drew with	16 Woden	Greenway Oval
Saturday, 13 May (3:00 pm)	Gungahlin 24	def. by	32 Goulburn	Gungahlin Enclosed Oval
Saturday, 13 May (3:00 pm)	West Belconnen 20	def. by	34 Belconnen United	Raiders Belconnen
Saturday, 13 May (3:00 pm)	Queanbeyan United 20	def.	4 Yass	Seiffert Oval
	Bye; Queanbeyan

=== Round 7 ===
	First Grade
Saturday, 20 May (3:00 pm)	Tuggeranong 26	def. by	36 West Belconnen	Greenway Oval
Saturday, 20 May (3:00 pm)	Woden 16	def. by	34 Queanbeyan United	Phillip District
Saturday, 20 May (3:00 pm)	Yass 12	def. by	37 Queanbeyan	Walker Park
Sunday, 21 May (2:00 pm)	Goulburn 28	def.	14 Belconnen United	Workers Arena
	Bye; Gungahlin

=== Round 8 ===
	First Grade
Saturday, 27 May (3:00 pm)	Gungahlin 18	def. by	24 Yass	Gungahlin Enclosed Oval
Saturday, 27 May (3:00 pm)	Belconnen United 24	def. by	44 Tuggeranong	O'Connor
Saturday, 27 May (3:00 pm)	Queanbeyan 40	def.	14 Woden	Seears Workwear Oval
Saturday, 27 May (3:00 pm)	Queanbeyan United 26	def.	16 West Belconnen	Seiffert Oval
	Bye; Goulburn

=== Round 9 ===
	First Grade
Saturday, 3 June (3:00 pm)	Tuggeranong 12	def. by	34 Queanbeyan United	Greenway Oval
Saturday, 3 June (3:00 pm)	Woden 12	def. by	52 Gungahlin	Phillip District
Saturday, 3 June (3:00 pm)	Yass 34	def.	22 Goulburn	Walker Park
Sunday, 4 June (3:00 pm)	West Belconnen 18	def. by	64 Queanbeyan	Raiders Belconnen
	Bye; Belconnen United

=== Round 10 ===
	First Grade
Saturday, 17 June (2:15 pm)	Tuggeranong 12	def. by	32 Queanbeyan	Greenway Oval
Saturday, 17 June (3:00 pm)	Queanbeyan United 46	def.	12 Belconnen United	Seiffert Oval
Sunday, 18 June (3:00 pm)	Woden 16	def. by	26 Goulburn	Phillip District
Sunday, 18 June (3:15 pm)	West Belconnen 18	def.	16 Gungahlin	Raiders Belconnen
	Bye; Yass

=== Round 11 ===
	First Grade
Saturday, 24 June (2:00 pm)	Belconnen United 12	def. by	46 Yass	O'Connor
Saturday, 24 June (2:00 pm)	Queanbeyan 20	def. by	24 Queanbeyan United	Seears Workwear Oval
Sunday, 25 June (2:00 pm)	Goulburn 28	def.	20 West Belconnen	Workers Arena
Sunday, 25 June (3:00 pm)	Gungahlin 22	def. by	38 Tuggeranong	Gungahlin Enclosed Oval
	Bye; Woden

=== Round 12 ===
	First Grade
Saturday, 1 July (2:00 pm)	Belconnen United 22	def. by	40 Queanbeyan	O'Connor
Saturday, 1 July (2:00 pm)	Queanbeyan United 46	def.	16 Gungahlin	Seiffert Oval
Saturday, 1 July (2:00 pm)	Yass 21	def.	20 Woden	Walker Park
Sunday, 2 July (2:15 pm)	Tuggeranong 30	def.	22 Goulburn	Greenway Oval
	Bye; West Belconnen

=== Round 13 ===
	First Grade
Saturday, 8 July (3:00 pm)	Gungahlin 20	def. by	58 Queanbeyan	Gungahlin Enclosed Oval
Saturday, 8 July (3:00 pm)	Woden 32	def.	18 Belconnen United	Phillip District
Saturday, 8 July (3:00 pm)	Yass 10	def. by	12 West Belconnen	Walker Park
Sunday, 9 July (2:00 pm)	Goulburn 24	def. by	46 Queanbeyan United	Workers Arena
	Bye; Tuggeranong

=== Round 14 ===
	First Grade
Saturday, 15 July (2:15 pm)	Tuggeranong 22	def. by	24 Yass	Greenway Oval
Saturday, 15 July (3:00 pm)	Gungahlin 48	def.	24 Belconnen United	Gungahlin Enclosed Oval
Saturday, 15 July (3:00 pm)	West Belconnen 30	def.	16 Woden	Raiders Belconnen
Saturday, 15 July (3:00 pm)	Queanbeyan 60	def.	6 Goulburn	Seears Workwear Oval
	Bye; Queanbeyan United

=== Round 15 ===
	First Grade
Saturday, 22 July (2:00 pm)	Belconnen United 0	def. by	60 West Belconnen	O'Connor
Saturday, 22 July (2:00 pm)	Yass 6	def. by	52 Queanbeyan United	Walker Palk
Sunday, 23 July (2:00 pm)	Goulburn 48	def.	22 Gungahlin	Workers Arena
Sunday, 23 July (3:00 pm)	Woden 24	drew with	24 Tuggeranong	Phillip District
	Bye; Queanbeyan

=== Round 16 ===
	First Grade
Saturday, 29 July (3:00 pm)	Belconnen United 4	def. by	54 Goulburn	O'Connor
Saturday, 29 July (3:00 pm)	Queanbeyan 36	def.	28 Yass	Seears Workwear Oval
Saturday, 29 July (3:00 pm)	Queanbeyan United 20	def.	14 Woden	Seiffert Oval
Sunday, 30 July (3:00 pm)	West Belconnen 18	def. by	34 Tuggeranong	Raiders Belconnen
	Bye; Gungahlin

=== Round 17 ===
	First Grade
Saturday, 5 August (2:15 pm)	Tuggeranong 74	def.	12 Belconnen United	Greenway Oval
Saturday, 5 August (3:00 pm)	Woden 36	def.	26 Queanbeyan	Philip District
Saturday, 5 August (3:00 pm)	Yass 44	def.	4 Gungahlin	Walker Park
Sunday, 6 August (3:00 pm)	West Belconnen 31	def.	28 Queanbeyan United	Raiders Belconnen
	Bye; Goulburn

=== Round 18 ===
	First Grade
Saturday, 12 August (3:00 pm)	Queanbeyan 10	def. by	30 West Belconnen	Seears Workwear Oval
Saturday, 12 August (3:00 pm)	Queanbeyan United 14	def. by	42 Tuggeranong	Seiffert Oval
Saturday, 12 August (3:00 pm)	Gungahlin 14	def. by	42 Woden	Gungahlin Enclosed Oval
Sunday, 13 August (2:00 pm)	Goulburn 22	def. by	48 Yass	Workers Arena
	Bye; Belconnen United

== First Grade Finals series ==
=== Bracket ===
Qualifying finals
1	Queanbeyan United	24
2	Queanbeyan	48
3	Yass	32
4	Tuggeranong	18

Preliminary final
Queanbeyan United	30
Yass	0

Grand final
Queanbeyan	6
Queanbeyan United	13

=== Results ===
Home	Score	Away	Match Information
Home	Score	Away	Date and Time	Venue	Referee
QUALIFYING & ELIMINATION FINAL
Queanbeyan United Blues	24 – 48	Queanbeyan Kangaroos	19 August 3:00 pm	Seiffert Oval	Oliver Levido
Yass Magpies	32 – 18	Tuggeranong Bushrangers	20 August 3:00 pm	Raiders Belconnen	Adam Williams
PRELIMINARY FINAL
Queanbeyan United Blues	30 – 0	Yass Magpies	27 August 3:30 pm	Seiffert Oval	Oliver Levido
GRAND FINAL
Queanbeyan Kangaroos	6 – 13	Queanbeyan United Blues	3 September 3:30 pm	Seiffert Oval	Oliver Levido

=== Match details ===
==== Major semi-final ====
Saturday, 19 August
3:00pm

Queanbeyan United Blues	24 – 48	Queanbeyan Kangaroos
Tries: George Stewart (33', 44') 2 Jake Wheeler (47', 76') 2 Thomas Ruediger (66') 1 Goals: Terry Campese 2/5 (48', 77')	1st: 4 – 30; 2nd: 20 – 18	Tries: 3 (4', 15', 70') Brent Crisp; 2 (20', 52') Jedidiah Simbiken; 1 (11') Aaron Gorrell; 1 (25') Mitchell Connolly; 1 (60') Bryan Cronan; Goals: 8/8 Brent Crisp (5', 12', 17', 21', 26', 54', 62', 72')

Seiffert Oval
Referee: Oliver Levido
Player of the Match: Brent Crisp

==== Minor semi-final ====
Sunday, 20 August
3:00pm

Yass Magpies	32 – 18	Tuggeranong Bushrangers
Tries: Junior Vatikani (37', 67') 2 Shaun Davis (22') 1 Jesse Collins (28') 1 Saipani Aiolupo (31') 1 Jai Smith (60') 1 Goals: Shaun Davis 4/7 (24', 33', 69', 75' pen)	1st: 20 – 6; 2nd: 12 – 12	Tries: 1 (17') John Papalii; 1 (49') Isileli Afemui; 1 (57') Atunaisa Tupou; Goals: 3/3 Josh Mitchell (18', 50', 59')

Raiders Belconnen
Referee: Adam Williams
Player of the Match: Junior Vatikani

==== Preliminary final ====
Sunday, 27 August
3:30pm

Queanbeyan United Blues	30 – 0	Yass Magpies
Tries: Michael Cullen (3', 8') 2 Aaron McInnes (33') 1 Thomas Ruediger (59') 1 Brendon Taueki (64') 1 Goals: Terry Campese 5/5 (4', 10', 28' pen, 34', 61'); Jake Wheeler 0/1	1st 20 – 0; 2nd: 10 – 0

Seiffert Oval
Referee: Oliver Levido
Player of the Match: Terry Campese

==== Grand final ====
Sunday, 3 September
3:30pm

Queanbeyan Kangaroos	6 – 13	Queanbeyan United Blues
Tries: Tolokano Aroha-Tuinauvai (19') 1 Goals: Brent Crisp 1/1 (20')	1st: 6 – 6; 2nd: 0 – 7	Tries: 1 (13') Adam Misios; 1 (65') Kyle O'Donnell; Goals: 2/2 Terry Campese (15', 66'); Field goals: 1 (56') Terry Campese

Seiffert Oval
Referee: Oliver Levido
Player of the Match: Terry Campese

== Other CRC Finals results ==
=== Reserve Grade ===
Home	Score	Away	Match Information
Home	Score	Away	Date and Time	Venue	Referee
QUALIFYING & ELIMINATION Finals
Queanbeyan United Blues	14 – 6	West Belconnen Warriors	19 August 1:10 pm	Seiffert Oval	Tyson Flynn
Queanbeyan Kangaroos	24 – 16	Yass Magpies	20 August 1:10 pm	Raiders Belconnen	Luke Barrow
PRELIMINARY FINAL
West Belconnen Warriors	12 – 8	Queanbeyan Kangaroos	27 August 1:40 pm	Seiffert Oval	Tyson Flynn
GRAND FINAL
Queanbeyan United Blues	16 – 18	West Belconnen Warriors	3 September 1:40 pm	Seiffert Oval	Adam Williams

=== Under 18's ===
Home	Score	Away	Match Information
Home	Score	Away	Date and Time	Venue	Referee
QUALIFYING & ELIMINATION Finals
Queanbeyan Kangaroos	10 – 22	Woden Valley Rams	19 August 11:45 am	Seiffert Oval	Andrew Nightingale
West Belconnen Warriors	14 – 36	Goulburn Workers Bulldogs	20 August 11:45 am	Raiders Belconnen	Luke Snowie
PRELIMINARY FINAL
Queanbeyan Kangaroos	6 – 24	Goulburn Workers Bulldogs	27 August 10:40 am	Seiffert Oval	Andrew Nightingale
GRAND FINAL
Woden Valley Rams	20 – 16	Goulburn Workers Bulldogs	3 September 10:40 am	Seiffert Oval	Andrew Nightingale

=== Ladies League Tag ===
Home	Score	Away	Match Information
Home	Score	Away	Date and Time	Venue	Referee
QUALIFYING & ELIMINATION Finals
West Belconnen Warriors	20 – 18	Yass Girl Pies	19 August 10:30 am	Seiffert Oval	Elijah Fernance
Goulburn Workers Bulldogs	16 – 10	Belconnen United Sharks	20 August 10:30 am	Raiders Belconnen	Shannon Castle
PRELIMINARY FINAL
Yass Girl Pies	4 – 12	Goulburn Workers Bulldogs	27 August 9:25 am	Seiffert Oval	Jake Bolton
GRAND FINAL
West Belconnen Warriors	14 – 8	Goulburn Workers Bulldogs	3 September 9:25 am	Seiffert Oval	Jake Bolton

== George Tooke Shield Finals results ==
=== Bracket ===
Qualifying finals
2	Harden	42
3	Boorowa	16
4	North Canberra	26
5	Binalong	12

Semi-finals
1	Crookwell	25
2	Harden	24
3	Boorowa	16
4	North Canberra	28

Preliminary final
2	Harden	20
4	North Canberra	14

Grand final
1	Crookwell	20
2	Harden	24

=== Results ===
Home	Score	Away	Match Information
Home	Score	Away	Date and Time	Venue	Referee
QUALIFIERS
North Canberra Bears	26 – 12	Binalong Brahmahs	19 August 1:35 pm	McLean Oval	Robert Moore
Harden Hawks	42 – 16	Boorowa Rovers	19 August 3:15 pm	McLean Oval	James Gould
QUALIFYING & ELIMINATION Finals
Boorowa Rovers	16 – 28	North Canberra Bears	26 August 2:45 pm	Boorowa Showground	Luke Barrow
Crookwell Green Devils	25 – 24	Harden Hawks	27 August 2:45 pm	Crookwell Memorial Showground	James Gould
PRELIMINARY FINAL
Harden Hawks	20 – 14	North Canberra Bears	2 September 2:45 pm	McLean Oval	Tyson Flynn
GRAND FINAL
Crookwell Green Devils	20 – 24	Harden Hawks	9 September 2:45 pm	Crookwell Memorial Showground	Tyson Flynn

== Other GTS Finals results ==
=== Youth League ===
Home	Score	Away	Match Information
Home	Score	Away	Date and Time	Venue	Referee
QUALIFIERS
Crookwell Green Devils	20 – 6	Tuggeranong Bushrangers	19 August 9:30 am	McLean Oval	Garth Widdowson
North Canberra Bears	46 – 6	Bungendore Tigers	20 August 9:00 am	Raiders Belconnen	Houshyar Fallah
QUALIFYING & ELIMINATION Finals
Tuggeranong Bushrangers	4 – 40	North Canberra Bears	26 August noon	Boorowa Showground	Garth Widdowson
Harden Hawks	40 – 22	Crookwell Green Devils	27 August noon	Crookwell Memorial Showground	Luke Snowie
PRELIMINARY FINAL
Crookwell Green Devils	14 – 32	North Canberra Bears	2 September noon	McLean Oval	Luke Barrow
GRAND FINAL
Harden Hawks	36 – 0	North Canberra Bears	9 September noon	Crookwell Memorial Showground	Luke Barrow

=== George Tooke Shield Ladies League Tag ===
Home	Score	Away	Match Information
Home	Score	Away	Date and Time	Venue	Referee
QUALIFIERS
Crookwell She Devils	22 – 20	Boorowa Roveretts	19 August 10:55 am	McLean Oval	James Martin
Harden Hawketts	22 – 8	Boomanulla Raiderettes	19 August 12:15 pm	McLean Oval	Andrew O'Brian
QUALIFYING & ELIMINATION Finals
Boomanulla Raiderettes	0 – 4	Crookwell She Devils	26 August 1:30 pm	Boorowa Showground	James Martin
Bungendore Tigerettes	26 – 14	Harden Hawketts	27 August 1:30 pm	Crookwell Memorial Showground	Shannon Castle
PRELIMINARY FINAL
Harden Hawketts	26 – 0	Crookwell She Devils	2 September 1:30 pm	McLean Oval	Andrew O'Brian
GRAND FINAL
Bungendore Tigerettes	28 – 16	Harden Hawketts	9 September 1:30 pm	Crookwell Memorial Showground	Andrew O'Brian
