= Canberra Rugby League =

Rugby league in Australia

Canberra Region Rugby League
- Current season or competition: 2026 Canberra Rugby League
- Sport: Rugby league
- Formerly known as: Group 8 (1932–66, 1971–80); Group 8/9 (1967–70); Group 19 (1974–79); CDRL (1980–81); ACTRL (1981–02)
- Instituted: 1932
- Inaugural season: 1998
- Number of teams: 9
- Country: Australia
- Premiers: Queanbeyan Kangaroos (2026)
- Most titles: Queanbeyan United Blues (26 titles)
- Broadcast partner: BarTV Sports
- Related competition: George Tooke Shield

The Canberra Region Rugby League competition is more commonly known as the Canberra Raiders Cup, covering the Australian Capital Territory and surrounding New South Wales towns Queanbeyan, Goulburn and Yass. The competition is run under the auspices of the Country Rugby League and players are eligible for selection in the Canberra Division of the CRL Tier 1 Divisional Championships. The Canberra district competition has an under 19s, reserve and first grade competitions.

== History ==
After the establishment of Rugby League in Sydney in 1909, the game slowly made its way south, reaching the Canberra District in the late 1910s. During those years and into the 1920s and 30s Challenge Cup football was the most popular form of competition, with a cup being donated as a prize for a game between 2 teams. The winning team would then have to defend the cup against all challengers. The most notable Challenge Cups in the Canberra region at the time were the Massey and Carr Cups which began in 1930 and 1933 respectively.

The first organised round robin competition was run in 1928 by Federal Capital Territory and District Rugby League. The winners of inaugural competition were the Acton Rovers and the next four years saw four different winners. The competition ran through until 1937 when interest in League began to dwindle.

The Group 8 Premiership began in 1932 and was strong enough to continue while interest in the game waned. Teams from Canberra, Yass, Queanbeyan and Goulburn competed for the title of premiers up until 1941, when all League competitions in the region were suspended due to the war. Competition resumed in 1946, with the Massey and Carr Cups only lasting the one season before being retired, while the Group 8 Premiership continued on strongly and was duly supported by ACT District Rugby League who ran a second division competition.

Some of the teams to compete during this period included Captains Flat, Crookwell, Braidwood, Goulburn Workers, Goulburn United, Queanbeyan and Yass in the Group 8 Competition while in the ACTDRL Second Division competition there were teams such as Ainslie, Causeway, Eastlake, Hall, R.A.A.F, R.M.C, South City and West City.

It was through the Second Division competition that the Molonglo Shield was established, first being played for in 1964 with Harman/NAVY taking out the inaugural title over the Canberra Rovers.

In 1967 Group 8 joined with part of Group 9 to form Group 8/9 or Zone 2. This was due to a CRL boundaries dispute in the Riverina, and saw Harden, Young and Wyangala Dam join the district competition. The Zone 2 format lasted until 1970 when CRL returned the boundaries in the Riverina to their original positions and Group 8 was restored.

In 1974 CRL officially recognised the Molonglo Shield as its own competition and gave it a Group number, Group 19. It was at this point in time that both Group 8 and Group 19 were strong enough to run first and second division competitions. The first division clubs ran firsts, reserves and Under 18's while the second division sides ran just one team.

Group 8 First Division consisted mainly of the teams which play Canberra Raiders Cup today, with the addition of Crookwell and Goulburn United. Group 8 Second Division was primarily for towns from around the Goulburn District including Taralga, Marulan, Bigga and Argyle. Braidwood also fielded a side in the competition.

Group 19 First Division comprised teams from around Canberra including Kambah, South Woden, Belconnen United and North Canberra. Batemans Bay also competed in Group 19 until 1977. Second Division was much like George Tooke Shield is today, with teams from Harman, Bungendore, Weston Creek and Captains Flat all competing for the title.

In 1980 Group 19 changed its name to ACTRL while in 1981 Group 8 changed to CDRL. In 1982 CDRL was granted entry into the NSWRL as the Canberra Raiders so the ACTRL took over the running of senior league in the district, combining the two groups to form 3 new competitions. The premier division still played for the Molonglo Shield, while the second division competition was split into North and South according to location within the District. In 1986 the two second division competitions were merged to form the Canberra Cup, which ran through until 1998.

In the meantime, a move by regional towns saw the establishment of the George Tooke Shield in 1995, which was aimed at clubs that wished to field firsts and under 18s but were not competitive enough for Molonglo Shield. In its first year 5 teams competed: East Canberra, Braidwood, Yass, Crookwell and Goulburn Exchange. While the Under 18s side of the competition only lasted 2 years, the George Tooke Shield has continued to expand, 9 clubs now competing for the title.

In 1998, after 35 years, the Molonglo Shield was retired and the Canberra Raiders Cup became the prize the first grade clubs competed for over a season. It is still that way today and the Shield still has its place in the game, awarded to the First Grade Minor Premiers.

== Clubs ==
=== 2027 Senior Clubs ===
==== First Grade ====
Club	Colours	City/Suburb	Home venue	Est.	FG Seasons	FG Premierships	
Club	Colours	City/Suburb	Home venue	Est.	FG Seasons	Total	Recent
Belconnen United Sharks		Canberra (Bruce)	NSWRL HQ Bruce	2016	2016–19, 2021–present	0	—
Goulburn Stockmen		Goulburn	Workers Arena	1996	1996–04, 2027–present	0	—
Gungahlin Bulls		Canberra (Gungahlin)	Gungahlin Enclosed Oval	1994	1994–present	2	2001
Queanbeyan Kangaroos		Queanbeyan (Crestwood)	Seears Workwear Oval	1966	1968–19, 2021–present	11	2026
Queanbeyan United Blues		Queanbeyan (Queanbeyan East)	Seiffert Oval	1928	1932–33, 1935–39, 1947–present	26	2019
Tuggeranong Valley Bushrangers		Canberra (Greenway)	Greenway Oval	2003	2003–19, 2021–present	0	—
West Belconnen Warriors		Canberra (Holt)	Raiders Belconnen	1975	1975–19, 2021–present	12	2022
Woden Valley Rams		Canberra (Phillip)	Phillip Oval	1967	1971–present	3	2018
Yass United Magpies		Yass	Walker Park	1919	1932–33, 1935–39, 1947–50, 1952–85, 1988–89, 1992–94, 2001–07, 2009–12, 2016–19, 2021–present	6	2006

==== Second Division ====
Club	Colours	City/Suburb	Home venue	Est.	Second Division Seasons	Second Division Premierships	
Club	Colours	City/Suburb	Home venue	Est.	Second Division Seasons	Total	Most recent
Binalong Brahmans		Binalong	Binalong Recreation Ground	1930	2000–05, 2007, 2010–11, 2013–14, 2017–19, 2021–2025	3	2014
Boorowa Rovers		Boorowa	Boorowa Showground	1998	2005–06, 2010–19, 2021–present	1	2023
Bungendore Tigers		Bungendore	Mick Sherd Oval	1952	1952, 1955–70, 1977–81, 1988–present	9	2025
Crookwell Green Devils		Crookwell	Crookwell Memorial Oval	1925	1994–19, 2021–present	5	2022
Googong Goannas		Googong	Duncan Playing Fields	2024	2025–present	0	—
Harden-Murrumburrah Hawks		Harden	McLean Oval	1920	2009–19, 2021–present	3	2026
North Canberra Bears		Canberra (Kaleen)	Kaleen Enclosed Oval	1971	1982, 1984–88, 2016–19, 2021–present	3	2019
Snowy River Bears		Jindabyne	JJ Connors Oval	1977	1997–02, 2025–present	0	—
University of Canberra Stars		Canberra (Holt)	Raiders Belconnen	2010	2013, 2017–19, 2021–present	0	—

== Former clubs ==
Club	Colours	City	First Grade Seasons	Reason	FG Premierships	
Club	Colours	City	First Grade Seasons	Reason	Total	Last
Group 8 Championship (1932–39)
Adaminaby		Adaminaby	1933			
Bargo Bunnies		Bargo	1932–33			
Berrima		Berrima	1937, 1939			
Bombala Blue Heelers		Bombala	1937–39			
Boorowa Rovers		Boorowa	1932, 1935–36, 1938			
Bowral Blues		Bowral	1935–38			
Bungendore Tigers		Bungendore	1932, 1938			
Cooma		Cooma	1932–33, 1937, 1939			
Cooma All Blacks		Cooma	1932–33			
Cooma Greens		Cooma	1932			
Jamberoo Superoos		Jamberoo	1935			
Kiama Knights		Kiama	1935–36			
Mount Keira		Wollongong	1936			
Mount Kembla Lowries		Wollongong	1936			
Nowra Warriors		Nowra	1935			
Port Kembla Blacks		Wollongong	1936–38			
Southern Monaro			1933			
Taralga Tigers		Taralga	1932			
Wollongong Bulls		Wollongong	1936			
Group 8 Premiership (1947–66)
Braidwood Bears		Braidwood	1947, 1955–58, 1961–64	Moved to Second Division		
Burrinjuck		Burrinjuck	1954	Merged with Binalong to form Burrinjuck-Binalong		
Burrinjuck-Binalong		Burrinjuck	1955	Folded		
Canberra Workmen Dragons		Canberra	1959–70	Merged with Ainslie-Campbell to form Canberra-Ainslie-Campbell		
Canberra United		Canberra	1932–33, 1935–39, 1947–59	Folded		
Goulburn		Goulburn	1932–33, 1935–39, 1947–57	Folded; Succeeded by Goulburn United & Goulburn Workers		
Grabben Gullen Blues		Grabben Gullen	1963–64	Moved to Second Division		
Gunning Roos		Gunning	1932, 1959–61	Entered Recess; Moved to Second Division		
North Canberra		Canberra	1949–52	Folded		
North City		Canberra	1954	Moved to Second Division		
Group 8/9 Premiership (1967–70)
Harden-Murrumburrah Hawks		Harden	1967–70	Joined from Group 9 as part of the Group 8/9 Premiership during the schism of the 1960s when Group 9 was divided, later rejoined Group 9		
Wyangala Dam		Wyangala	1967	Joined from Group 9 as part of the Group 8/9 Premiership during the schism of the 1960s when Group 9 was divided, then folded		
Young Cherrypickers		Young	1967–70	Joined from Group 9 as part of the Group 8/9 Premiership during the schism of the 1960s when Group 9 was divided, later rejoined Group 9		
Group 8/CDRL Premiership (1971–81)
North Canberra Bears		Canberra	1974–81	Moved to Second Division		
Group 19/ACTRL Premiership (1974–81)
Batemans Bay Tigers		Batemans Bay	1974–77	Moved to Group 7		
Captains Flat Redmen		Captains Flat	1938–39, 1947–61, 1974–75	Folded		
East Canberra United		Canberra	1971–75, 1978–81	Recess; Merged with Canberra to form East Canberra Tigers		
Koorie United (Boomanulla)		Canberra	1980	Moved to Second Division		
South Canberra		Canberra	1974–76	Folded		
South Woden Saints		Canberra	1974–79	Folded		
Tuggeranong-South Woden		Canberra	1980	Folded		
West Canberra Magpies		Canberra	1974	Folded		
Weston Creek Rabbitohs		Canberra	1978–81	Moved to Second Division		
Molonglo Shield (1982–97)
Belconnen United Panthers		Canberra	1974–87	Merged with Lakes United to form Belconnen United Sharks		
Belconnen United Sharks		Canberra	1988–93	Folded; Succeeded by Ginninderra Bulls		
Canberra Tigers		Canberra	1971–84	Merged with East Canberra to form East Canberra Tigers		
Crookwell Green Devils		Crookwell	1932–33, 1935, 1937–38, 1953, 1955–61, 1965, 1970–89, 1991–93	Moved to Second Division		
Goulburn City		Goulburn	1987	Folded		
Goulburn Gladiators		Goulburn	1991–95	Merged with Kenmore to form Goulburn Stockmen		
Goulburn United Roosters		Goulburn	1958–86	Folded; Succeeded by Goulburn City		
Gungahlin Gallopers		Canberra	1978–81, 1988–92	Folded		
Jerrabomberra Diggers		Queanbeyan	1991–92	Moved to Second Division		
Lakes United Sharks		Canberra	1974–79, 1983–84	Merged with Belconnen United to form Belconnen United Sharks		
Canberra Raiders Cup (1998–19)
Belconnen United Scholars		Canberra	2006–15	Folded; Succeeded by Belconnen United Sharks		
Cooma United Stallions		Cooma	1997–00	Moved to Group 16		
East Canberra Tigers		Canberra	1989–93, 1996–98	Moved to Second Division		
Goulburn Workers Bulldogs		Goulburn	1958–84, 2008–19	Succeeded Goulburn Stockmen after their return from Group 6 in 2008. Folded 2019; Succeeded by Goulburn City Bulldogs		
Goulburn City Bulldogs		Goulburn	2021–26	Changed name back to Goulburn Stockmen		
Tuggeranong United Buffaloes		Canberra	1976–79, 1981–02	Merged with Valley Dragons and South Tuggeranong to form Tuggeranong Bushrangers		
Valley Dragons		Canberra	1994–98, 2002	Merged with Tuggeranong United and South Tuggeranong to form Tuggeranong Bushrangers		
CRRL Cup (2020)
Canberra Raiders U20s		Canberra	2020	Competed in COVID-19 affected season		

== First Grade Grand Finals ==
Year	Premiers	Score	Runners-up	Match Information
Year	Premiers	Score	Runners-up	Date	Venue	Referee
Group 8 Championship (1932–39)
1932	Queanbeyan United Blues	13 – 0	Canberra	11 September 1932	Queanbeyan Showground, Queanbeyan	B. Fry
1933	Goulburn	7 – 2	Canberra	20 August 1933	League Park, Goulburn
1934	No Group Competition
1935	Canberra	3 – 3	Goulburn* (2)	6 October 1935	Queanbeyan Showground, Queanbeyan	J. Murphy
1936	(2) Queanbeyan United Blues	19 – 9	Goulburn	4 October 1936	League Park, Goulburn	L. Deane
1937	(3) Queanbeyan United Blues	25 – 12	Goulburn	19 September 1937	League Park, Goulburn	L. Deane
1937	(3) Queanbeyan United Blues	29 – 7	Goulburn	3 October 1937	Queanbeyan Showground, Queanbeyan	A. Spankie
1938	(4) Queanbeyan United Blues	7 – 2	Canberra	25 September 1938	League Park, Goulburn
1939	Yass United Magpies	14 – 11	Canberra	17 September 1939	Victoria Park, Yass
1940	No Group Competition Due to World War II
1941	No Group Competition Due to World War II
1942	No Group Competition Due to World War II
1943	No Group Competition Due to World War II
1944	No Group Competition Due to World War II
1945	No Group Competition Due to World War II
1946	No Group Competition Due to World War II
Group 8 Premiership (1947–66, 1971–79)
1947	(2) Canberra	13 – 2	Queanbeyan United Blues	7 September 1947	Queanbeyan Showground, Queanbeyan	T. Knight
1948	(2) Yass United Magpies	13 – 9	Queanbeyan United Blues	5 September 1948	League Park, Goulburn	T. Knight
1949	(3) Goulburn	11 – 3	Queanbeyan United Blues	18 September 1949	Queanbeyan Showground, Queanbeyan	L. Lees
1950	Captains Flat Redmen	9 – 5	Goulburn	24 September 1950	Queanbeyan Showground, Queanbeyan	R. Nicholls
1951	(5) Queanbeyan United Blues	15 – 10	Goulburn	30 September 1951	Queanbeyan Showground, Queanbeyan	A. Nicholls
1952	(2) Captains Flat Redmen	9 – 2	Yass United Magpies	10 August 1952	Queanbeyan Showground, Queanbeyan	A. Nicholls
1953	(3) Captains Flat Redmen	17 – 4	Queanbeyan United Blues	6 September 1953	Queanbeyan Showground, Queanbeyan	R. Nicholls
1954	(3) Yass United Magpies	7 – 0	North City	26 September 1954	Victoria Park, Yass	A. Nicholls
1955	Crookwell Green's	18 – 13	Goulburn	4 September 1955	Crookwell Memorial Oval, Crookwell	R. Nicholls
1956	(4) Yass United Magpies	8 – 3	Captains Flat Redmen	9 September 1956	Queanbeyan Showground, Queanbeyan	A. Nicholls
1957	(4) Captains Flat Redmen	27 – 8	Queanbeyan United Blues	8 September 1957	Manuka Oval, Canberra	J. Jewell
1958	Goulburn Workers	9 – 5	Captains Flat Redmen	12 October 1958	League Park, Goulburn	J. Jewell
1959	(5) Yass United Magpies	13 – 3	Crookwell Green's	20 September 1959	Queanbeyan Showground, Queanbeyan	J. Jewell
1960	(2) Goulburn Workers	20 – 5	Yass United Magpies	25 September 1960	Queanbeyan Showground, Queanbeyan	B. Ison
1961	(3) Goulburn Workers	16 – 4	Yass United Magpies	3 September 1961	Queanbeyan Showground, Queanbeyan	T. Reynolds
1962	Goulburn United Roosters	18 – 11	Goulburn Workers	9 September 1962	League Park, Goulburn	B. Chapman
1963	(2) Goulburn United Roosters	17 – 2	Canberra Workmen	29 September 1963	League Park, Goulburn	M. Whitby
1964	(4) Goulburn Workers	10 – 3	Queanbeyan United Blues	6 September 1964	Queanbeyan Showground, Queanbeyan	A. Hutton
1965	(6) Queanbeyan United Blues	17 – 7	Goulburn Workers	3 October 1965	League Park, Goulburn	B. Ison
1966	(7) Queanbeyan United Blues	14 – 0	Goulburn Workers	2 October 1966	Manuka Oval, Canberra	K. Lyons
Group 8/9 Premiership (1967–70)
1967	(8) Queanbeyan United Blues	14 – 6	Goulburn United Roosters	24 September 1967	Seiffert Oval, Queanbeyan	B. Chapman
1968	Young Cherrypickers	9 – 8	Queanbeyan United Blues	22 September 1968	Seiffert Oval, Queanbeyan	K. Lyons
1969	Queanbeyan Kangaroos	8 – 2	Queanbeyan United Blues	14 September 1969	Seiffert Oval, Queanbeyan	B. Chapman
1970	(2) Queanbeyan Kangaroos	12 – 0	Queanbeyan United Blues	27 September 1970	Seiffert Oval, Queanbeyan	B. Chapman
Group 8 Premiership (1947–66, 1971–79)
1971	(3) Queanbeyan Kangaroos	16 – 8	Queanbeyan United Blues	12 September 1971	Seiffert Oval, Queanbeyan	B. Chapman
1972	(5) Goulburn Workers	12 – 10	Queanbeyan Kangaroos	24 September 1972	Seiffert Oval, Queanbeyan	B. Chapman
1973	Canberra Tigers	17 – 8	Queanbeyan United Blues	16 September 1973	Seiffert Oval, Queanbeyan	B. Chapman
1974	(9) Queanbeyan United Blues	16 – 15	Canberra Tigers	22 September 1974	Seiffert Oval, Queanbeyan	N. Bissett
1975	(10) Queanbeyan United Blues	18 – 7	Goulburn United Roosters	31 August 1975	Seiffert Oval, Queanbeyan	N. Bissett
1976	(2) Canberra Tigers	12 – 11	Queanbeyan United Blues	19 September 1976	Seiffert Oval, Queanbeyan	N. Bissett
1977	(3) Goulburn United Roosters	34 – 16	Queanbeyan United Blues	21 August 1977	Seiffert Oval, Queanbeyan	N. Bissett
1978	(11) Queanbeyan United Blues	16 – 14	Queanbeyan Kangaroos	24 September 1978	Seiffert Oval, Queanbeyan	N. Bissett
1979	(12) Queanbeyan United Blues	11 – 4	Queanbeyan Kangaroos	16 September 1979	Seiffert Oval, Queanbeyan	N. Bissett
Group 19 Premiership (1974–79)
1974	North Canberra Bears	12 – 9	Batemans Bay Tigers	8 September 1974	Manuka Oval, Canberra	B. Foran
1975	Belconnen United Panthers	17 – 11	South Woden Saints	14 September 1975	Manuka Oval, Canberra	N. Bissett
1976	(2) Belconnen United Panthers	22 – 5	West Belconnen Warriors	29 August 1976	Northbourne Oval, Canberra	N. Bissett
1977	(3) Belconnen United Panthers	24 – 14	West Belconnen Warriors	4 September 1977	Manuka Oval, Canberra	B. Foran
1978	(4) Belconnen United Panthers	22 – 13	Lakes United Sharks	3 September 1978	Northbourne Oval, Canberra	N. Bissett
1979	(5) Belconnen United Panthers	20 – 18	Canberra Gallopers	23 September 1979	Northbourne Oval, Canberra	K. Pickard
CDRL Premiership (1980–81)
1980	(13) Queanbeyan United Blues	17 – 0	North Canberra Bears	28 September 1980	Seiffert Oval, Queanbeyan	N. Bissett
1981	(14) Queanbeyan United Blues	20 – 8	Queanbeyan Kangaroos	13 September 1981	Seiffert Oval, Queanbeyan	N. Bissett
ACTRL Premiership (1980–81)
1980	Canberra Gallopers	30 – 16	East Canberra United	28 September 1980	Seiffert Oval, Queanbeyan	K. Pickard
1981	(6) Belconnen United Panthers	13 – 2	Yass United Magpies	6 September 1981	Northbourne Oval, Canberra	K. Pickard
Molonglo Shield (1982–97)
1982	(6) Goulburn Workers	14 – 5	Goulburn United Roosters	19 September 1982	Workers Arena, Goulburn	J. Mahoney
1983	(4) Queanbeyan Kangaroos	16 – 10	Queanbeyan United Blues	18 September 1983	Seiffert Oval, Queanbeyan	G. Jones
1984	(7) Goulburn Bulldogs	10 – 8	Queanbeyan Kangaroos	16 September 1984	Northbourne Oval, Canberra	B. Lloyd
1985	(5) Queanbeyan Kangaroos	11 – 0	West Belconnen Warriors	8 September 1985	Northbourne Oval, Canberra	G. Jones
1986	West Belconnen Warriors	17 – 0	Woden Valley Rams	7 September 1986	Northbourne Oval, Canberra	J. Mahoney
1987	(15) Queanbeyan United Blues	6 – 4	Queanbeyan Kangaroos	30 August 1987	Northbourne Oval, Canberra	J. Mahoney
1988	Woden Valley Rams	23 – 18	West Belconnen Warriors	28 August 1988	Northbourne Oval, Canberra	J. Mahoney
1989	(2) West Belconnen Warriors	26 – 4	Woden Valley Rams	17 September 1989	Northbourne Oval, Canberra	J. Mahoney
1990	(3) West Belconnen Warriors	21 – 13	Woden Valley Rams	15 September 1990	Seiffert Oval, Queanbeyan	J. Mahoney
1991	(4) West Belconnen Warriors	14 – 4	Woden Valley Rams	14 September 1991	Seiffert Oval, Queanbeyan	J. Mahoney
1992	(16) Queanbeyan United Blues	9 – 6	West Belconnen Warriors	13 September 1992	Seiffert Oval, Queanbeyan	J. Mahoney
1993	(5) West Belconnen Warriors	30 – 20	Queanbeyan United Blues	12 September 1993	Seiffert Oval, Queanbeyan	A. Thompson
1994	(17) Queanbeyan United Blues	17 – 16	West Belconnen Warriors	4 September 1994	Seiffert Oval, Queanbeyan	R. Terry
1995	(6) West Belconnen Warriors	26 – 14	Queanbeyan United Blues	10 September 1995	Seiffert Oval, Queanbeyan	R. Terry
1996	(2) Woden Valley Rams	14 – 10	West Belconnen Warriors	8 September 1996	Seiffert Oval, Queanbeyan	M. Harradine
1997	(7) West Belconnen Warriors	26 – 8	Goulburn Stockmen	16 September 1997	Seiffert Oval, Queanbeyan	J. Elliott
Canberra Raiders Cup (1998–19, 2021–Present)
1998	(8) West Belconnen Warriors	44 – 14	Queanbeyan United Blues	13 September 1998	Seiffert Oval, Queanbeyan	M. Harradine
1999	Gungahlin Bulls	42 – 28	Queanbeyan United Blues	12 September 1999	Seiffert Oval, Queanbeyan	M. Harradine
2000	(18) Queanbeyan United Blues	44 – 12	Gungahlin Bulls	13 August 2000	Margaret Donoghoe Oval, Queanbeyan	C. Wilson
2001	(2) Gungahlin Bulls	18 – 4	Queanbeyan United Blues	26 August 2001	Seiffert Oval, Queanbeyan	C. Wilson
2002	(19) Queanbeyan United Blues	34 – 20	West Belconnen Warriors	15 September 2002	Seiffert Oval, Queanbeyan	C. Wilson
2003	(20) Queanbeyan United Blues	30 – 28	West Belconnen Warriors	31 August 2003	Seiffert Oval, Queanbeyan	R. Cranston
2004	(9) West Belconnen Warriors	38 – 10	Queanbeyan United Blues	29 August 2004	Seiffert Oval, Queanbeyan	R. Cranston
2005	(21) Queanbeyan United Blues	38 – 34	West Belconnen Warriors	28 August 2005	Seiffert Oval, Queanbeyan	M. Laverty
2006	(6) Yass United Magpies	44 – 18	Queanbeyan United Blues	3 September 2006	Seiffert Oval, Queanbeyan	M. Laverty
2007	(10) West Belconnen Warriors	24 – 10	Tuggeranong Valley Bushrangers	9 September 2007	Seiffert Oval, Queanbeyan	M. Laverty
2008	(22) Queanbeyan United Blues	46 – 18	Gungahlin Bulls	28 September 2008	Seiffert Oval, Queanbeyan	R. Cranston
2009	(8) Goulburn Workers Bulldogs	29 – 24	West Belconnen Warriors	27 September 2009	Seiffert Oval, Queanbeyan	R. Cranston
2010	(6) Queanbeyan Kangaroos	41 – 16	Belconnen United Scholars	19 September 2010	Seiffert Oval, Queanbeyan	R. Cranston
2011	(7) Queanbeyan Kangaroos	20 – 16	Queanbeyan United Blues	11 September 2011	Seiffert Oval, Queanbeyan	R. Cranston
2012	Belconnen United Scholars	38 – 26	Queanbeyan Kangaroos	23 September 2012	Seiffert Oval, Queanbeyan	R. Cranston
2013	(8) Queanbeyan Kangaroos	21 – 20	Queanbeyan United Blues	1 September 2013	Seiffert Oval, Queanbeyan	H. Fallah
2014	(23) Queanbeyan United Blues	24 – 20	Goulburn Workers Bulldogs	7 September 2014	Seiffert Oval, Queanbeyan	M. Jones
2015	(24) Queanbeyan United Blues	24 – 14	Goulburn Workers Bulldogs	6 September 2015	Seiffert Oval, Queanbeyan	M. Jones
2016	(11) West Belconnen Warriors	26 – 24	Queanbeyan Kangaroos	11 September 2016	Seiffert Oval, Queanbeyan	J. West
2017	(25) Queanbeyan United Blues	13 – 6	Queanbeyan Kangaroos	3 September 2017	Seiffert Oval, Queanbeyan	O. Levido
2018	(3) Woden Valley Rams	31 – 30	Tuggeranong Valley Bushrangers	2 September 2018	Seiffert Oval, Queanbeyan	O. Levido
2019	(26) Queanbeyan United Blues	34 – 14	Goulburn Workers Bulldogs	8 September 2019	Seiffert Oval, Queanbeyan	A. Wheeler
CRRL Cup (2020)
2020	Canberra Raiders (U20s)	66 – 10	Gungahlin Bulls	27 September 2020	Seiffert Oval, Queanbeyan	A. Nightingale
Canberra Raiders Cup (1998–19, 2021–Present)
2021	Competition Suspended Due to Covid-19
2022	(12) West Belconnen Warriors	38 – 24	Queanbeyan United Blues	18 September 2022	Seiffert Oval, Queanbeyan	A. Nightingale
2023	(9) Queanbeyan Kangaroos	34 – 6	Tuggeranong Valley Bushrangers	17 September 2023	Seiffert Oval, Queanbeyan	A. Nightingale
2024	(10) Queanbeyan Kangaroos	18 – 10	Queanbeyan United Blues	8 September 2024	Seiffert Oval, Queanbeyan	J. McManus
2025	(27) Queanbeyan United Blues	28 – 26	Queanbeyan Kangaroos	13 September 2025	Seiffert Oval, Queanbeyan	O. Levido
2026	(11) Queanbeyan Kangaroos	28 – 16	Queanbeyan United Blues	19 September 2026	Seiffert Oval, Queanbeyan	O. Levido

- * = Joint Premiers

=== Team performance ===
Team	Winners	Runners-up	Years won	Years runner-up
Queanbeyan United Blues	27	26	1932, 1936, 1937, 1938, 1951, 1965, 1966, 1967, 1974, 1975, 1978, 1979, 1980, 1981, 1987, 1992, 1994, 2000, 2002, 2003, 2005, 2008, 2014, 2015, 2017, 2019, 2025	1947, 1948, 1949, 1953, 1957, 1964, 1968, 1969, 1970, 1971, 1973, 1976, 1977, 1983, 1993, 1995, 1998, 1999, 2001, 2004, 2006, 2011, 2013, 2022, 2024, 2026
West Belconnen Warriors	12	11	1986, 1989, 1990, 1991, 1993, 1995, 1997, 1998, 2004, 2007, 2016, 2022	1976, 1977, 1985, 1988, 1992, 1994, 1996, 2002, 2003, 2005, 2009
Queanbeyan Kangaroos	11	10	1969, 1970, 1971, 1983, 1985, 2010, 2011, 2013, 2023, 2024, 2026	1972, 1978, 1979, 1981, 1984, 1987, 2012, 2016, 2017, 2025
Goulburn Workers Bulldogs	8	7	1958, 1960, 1961, 1964, 1972, 1982, 1984, 2009	1962, 1965, 1966, 2014, 2015, 2019
Yass United Magpies	6	4	1939, 1948, 1954, 1956, 1959, 2006	1952, 1960, 1961, 1981
Belconnen United Panthers	6	0	1975, 1976, 1977, 1978, 1979, 1981	–
Captains Flat Redmen	4	2	1950, 1952, 1953, 1957	1956, 1958
Goulburn	3	5	1933, 1935, 1949	1936, 1937, 1950, 1951, 1955
Woden Valley Rams	3	4	1988, 1996, 2018	1986, 1989, 1990, 1991
Goulburn United Roosters	3	3	1962, 1963, 1977	1967, 1975, 1982
Canberra United	2	4	1935, 1947	1932, 1933, 1938, 1939
Gungahlin Bulls	2	3	1999, 2001	2000, 2008, 2020
Canberra Tigers	2	1	1973, 1976	1974
Crookwell Green Devils	1	1	1955	1959
North Canberra Bears	1	1	1974	1980
Gungahlin Gallopers	1	1	1980	1979
Belconnen United Scholars	1	1	2012	2010
Young Cherrypickers	1	0	1968	–
Canberra Raiders (U20s)	1	0	2020	–
Tuggeranong Valley Bushrangers	0	3	–	2007, 2018, 2023
North City	0	1	–	1954
Canberra Workmen Dragons	0	1	–	1963
Batemans Bay Tigers	0	1	–	1974
South Woden Saints	0	1	–	1975
Lakes United Sharks	0	1	–	1978
East Canberra United	0	1	–	1980
Goulburn Stockmen	0	1	–	1997

== Reserve Grade Grand Finals ==
Year	Premiers	Score	Runners-up	Match Information
Year	Premiers	Score	Runners-up	Date	Venue	Referee
Group 8 Reserve Grade (1948–66, 1971–79)
1948	Queanbeyan United Blues (R)	8 – 4	Goulburn (R)	25 July 1948	Northbourne Oval, Canberra	A. Corcoran
1949	No Reserve Grade Competition
1950	Braidwood Bears	7 – 6	Bungendore Tigers	13 August 1950	Braidwood Showground, Braidwood	Peck
1951	No Reserve Grade Competition
1952	No Reserve Grade Competition
1953	Grabben Gullen Blues	10 – 9	Yass United Magpies (R)	20 September 1953	Crookwell Memorial Oval, Crookwell	V. Ryan
1954	Yass United Magpies (R)	11 – 2	Burrinjuck (R)	6 September 1954	Victoria Park, Yass	V. Ryan
1955	Crookwell Green's (R)	19 – 14	Goulburn (R)	4 September 1955	Crookwell Memorial Oval, Crookwell
1956	Captains Flat Redmen (R)	11 – 3	Goulburn (R)	2 September 1956	Queanbeyan Showground, Queanbeyan
1957	Northern Suburbs (R)	19 – 0	Captains Flat Redmen (R)	21 July 1957	Narrabundah Oval, Canberra	A. Nicholls
1958	Goulburn United Roosters (R)	13 – 9	Yass United Magpies (R)	12 October 1958	League Park, Goulburn	H. Eisler
1959	(2) Captains Flat Redmen (R)	20 – 9	Yass United Magpies (R)	20 September 1959	Queanbeyan Showground, Queanbeyan
1960	(2) Yass United Magpies (R)	32 – 0	Captains Flat Redmen (R)	25 September 1960	Queanbeyan Showground, Queanbeyan	T. Reynolds
1961	(2) Goulburn United Roosters (R)	12 – 0	Queanbeyan United Blues (R)	3 September 1961	Queanbeyan Showground, Queanbeyan
1962	Goulburn Workers (R)	11 – 2	Goulburn United Roosters (R)	9 September 1962	League Park, Goulburn
1963	(2) Goulburn Workers (R)	10 – 8	Bungendore Tigers	29 September 1963	League Park, Goulburn	T. Reynolds
1964	(2) Queanbeyan United Blues (R)	27 – 0	Goulburn United Roosters (R)	6 September 1964	Queanbeyan Showground, Queanbeyan	B. Chapman
1965	(3) Goulburn Workers (R)	9 – 2	Queanbeyan United Blues (R)	3 October 1965	League Park, Goulburn	B. Chapman
1966	(3) Queanbeyan United Blues (R)	26 – 2	Goulburn Workers (R)	2 October 1966	Manuka Oval, Canberra	B. Chapman
Group 8/9 Reserve Grade (1967–70)
1967	(4) Queanbeyan United Blues (R)	22 – 14	Goulburn Workers (R)	24 September 1967	Seiffert Oval, Queanbeyan	K. Lyons
1968	(5) Queanbeyan United Blues (R)	18 – 5	Goulburn Workers (R)	22 September 1968	Seiffert Oval, Queanbeyan
1969	Queanbeyan Kangaroos (R)	6 – 0	Yass United Magpies (R)	14 September 1969	Seiffert Oval, Queanbeyan	B. Cranston
1970	(6) Queanbeyan United Blues (R)	12 – 0	Queanbeyan Kangaroos (R)	27 September 1970	Seiffert Oval, Queanbeyan
Group 8 Reserve Grade (1948–66, 1971–79)
1971	(2) Queanbeyan Kangaroos (R)	10 – 5	Queanbeyan United Blues (R)	12 September 1971	Seiffert Oval, Queanbeyan	L. Petherbridge
1972	(7) Queanbeyan United Blues (R)	28 – 7	Canberra-Ainslie-Campbell Tigers (R)	24 September 1972	Seiffert Oval, Queanbeyan	L. Petherbridge
1973	(3) Goulburn United Roosters (R)	24 – 17	Queanbeyan United Blues (R)	16 September 1973	Seiffert Oval, Queanbeyan
1974	(8) Queanbeyan United Blues (R)	34 – 2	East Canberra United (R)	22 September 1974	Seiffert Oval, Queanbeyan
1975	Woden Valley Rams (R)	19 – 9	Queanbeyan United Blues (R)	31 August 1975	Seiffert Oval, Queanbeyan
1976	(9) Queanbeyan United Blues (R)	9 – 8	Woden Valley Rams (R)	19 September 1976	Seiffert Oval, Queanbeyan
1977	(10) Queanbeyan United Blues (R)	13 – 2	Canberra Tigers (R)	27 August 1977	Seiffert Oval, Queanbeyan
1978	(4) Goulburn United Roosters (R)	21 – 12	Queanbeyan United Blues (R)	24 September 1978	Seiffert Oval, Queanbeyan
1979	(11) Queanbeyan United Blues (R)	20 – 16	Goulburn Workers (R)	16 September 1979	Seiffert Oval, Queanbeyan	N. Wardle
Group 19 Reserve Grade (1974–79)
1974	South Woden Saints (R)	16 – 10	North Canberra Bears (R)	8 September 1974	Manuka Oval, Canberra
1975	(2) South Woden Saints (R)	18 – 13	Lakes United Sharks (R)	14 September 1975	Manuka Oval, Canberra
1976	Lakes United Sharks (R)	22 – 7	Belconnen United Panthers (R)	29 August 1976	Northbourne Oval, Canberra
1977	(2) Lakes United Sharks (R)	8 – 7	Weston Creek Rabbitohs (R)	4 September 1977	Manuka Oval, Canberra
1978	Belconnen United Panthers (R)	12 – 8	Lakes United Sharks (R)	3 September 1978	Northbourne Oval, Canberra
1979	Canberra Gallopers (R)	22 – 3	South Woden Saints (R)	23 September 1979	Northbourne Oval, Canberra
CDRL Reserve Grade (1980–81)
1980	(12) Queanbeyan United Blues (R)	25 – 15	Queanbeyan Kangaroos (R)	28 September 1980	Seiffert Oval, Queanbeyan	J. Ellis
1981	West Belconnen Warriors (R)	17 – 5	Queanbeyan United Blues (R)	13 September 1981	Seiffert Oval, Queanbeyan
ACTRL Reserve Grade (1980–81)
1980	(2) Belconnen United Panthers (R)	36 – 4	Lakes United Sharks (R)	28 September 1980	Seiffert Oval, Queanbeyan	L. Regent
1981	Canberra Tigers (R)	19 – 8	Yass United Magpies (R)	6 September 1981	Northbourne Oval, Canberra	L. Regent
Molonglo Shield Reserve Grade (1982–97)
1982	(2) West Belconnen Warriors (R)	10 – 9	Goulburn Workers (R)	19 September 1982	Workers Arena, Goulburn	P. Frazer
1983	(2) Crookwell Green Devils (R)	14 – 6	Queanbeyan United Blues (R)	18 September 1983	Seiffert Oval, Queanbeyan	J. Mahoney
1984	(3) Queanbeyan Kangaroos (R)	22 – 11	West Belconnen Warriors (R)	16 September 1984	Northbourne Oval, Canberra	I. Quinton
1985	(2) Woden Valley Rams (R)	16 – 4	Queanbeyan Kangaroos (R)	8 September 1985	Northbourne Oval, Canberra	J. Mahoney
1986	(13) Queanbeyan United Blues (R)	31 – 6	Woden Valley Rams (R)	7 September 1986	Northbourne Oval, Canberra	D. Sparks
1987	(14) Queanbeyan United Blues (R)	20 – 6	Queanbeyan Kangaroos (R)	30 August 1987	Northbourne Oval, Canberra	G. Eade
1988	(4) Queanbeyan Kangaroos (R)	22 – 10	Woden Valley Rams (R)	28 August 1988	Northbourne Oval, Canberra	N. Maher
1989	(5) Queanbeyan Kangaroos (R)	21 – 10	Queanbeyan United Blues (R)	17 September 1989	Northbourne Oval, Canberra	G. Henderson
1990	(6) Queanbeyan Kangaroos (R)	6 – 2	West Belconnen Warriors (R)	15 September 1990	Seiffert Oval, Queanbeyan	N. Maher
1991	(15) Queanbeyan United Blues (R)	14 – 8	Queanbeyan Kangaroos (R)	14 September 1991	Seiffert Oval, Queanbeyan	W. Close
1992	Goulburn Gladiators (R)	13 – 0	Queanbeyan Kangaroos (R)	13 September 1992	Seiffert Oval, Queanbeyan	W. Close
1993	(3) Woden Valley Rams (R)	22 – 12	West Belconnen Warriors (R)	12 September 1993	Seiffert Oval, Queanbeyan	P. John
1994	(3) West Belconnen Warriors (R)	20 – 16	Ginninderra Bulls (R)	4 September 1994	Seiffert Oval, Queanbeyan	R. Cranston
1995	(4) West Belconnen Warriors (R)	22 – 10	Queanbeyan United Blues (R)	17 September 1995	Seiffert Oval, Queanbeyan	J. Elliott
1996	Tuggeranong United Buffaloes (R)	16 – 12	West Belconnen Warriors (R)	8 September 1996	Seiffert Oval, Queanbeyan	J. Elliott
1997	(2) Tuggeranong United Buffaloes (R)	14 – 0	Queanbeyan Kangaroos (R)	16 September 1997	Seiffert Oval, Queanbeyan	B. Cummins
Canberra Raiders Cup Reserve Grade (1998–19, 2021–Present)
1998	Goulburn Stockmen (R)	18 – 16	West Belconnen Warriors (R)	13 September 1998	Seiffert Oval, Queanbeyan	B. Cummins
1999	(5) West Belconnen Warriors (R)	40 – 8	Woden Valley Rams (R)	12 September 1999	Seiffert Oval, Queanbeyan	R. Gallacher
2000	(16) Queanbeyan United Blues (R)	24 – 12	West Belconnen Warriors (R)	13 August 2000	Margaret Donoghoe Oval, Queanbeyan	R. Gallacher
2001	(17) Queanbeyan United Blues (R)	6 – 4	West Belconnen Warriors (R)	26 August 2001	Seiffert Oval, Queanbeyan	B. Cummins
2002	(7) Queanbeyan Kangaroos (R)	34 – 20	West Belconnen Warriors (R)	15 September 2002	Seiffert Oval, Queanbeyan	R. Cranston
2003	(18) Queanbeyan United Blues (R)	46 – 10	Tuggeranong Valley Bushrangers (R)	31 August 2003	Seiffert Oval, Queanbeyan	M. Laverty
2004	(19) Queanbeyan United Blues (R)	32 – 12	Queanbeyan Kangaroos (R)	29 August 2004	Seiffert Oval, Queanbeyan	M. Harradine
2005	(6) West Belconnen Warriors (R)	26 – 20	Queanbeyan United Blues (R)	28 August 2005	Seiffert Oval, Queanbeyan	N. Hill
2006	(7) West Belconnen Warriors (R)	34 – 12	Queanbeyan United Blues (R)	3 September 2006	Seiffert Oval, Queanbeyan	N. Hill
2007	(8) West Belconnen Warriors (R)	34 – 10	Tuggeranong Valley Bushrangers (R)	9 September 2007	Seiffert Oval, Queanbeyan	P. Henderson
2008	(9) West Belconnen Warriors (R)	30 – 14	Tuggeranong Valley Bushrangers (R)	28 September 2008	Seiffert Oval, Queanbeyan	R. Moore
2009	(10) West Belconnen Warriors (R)	36 – 10	Goulburn Workers Bulldogs (R)	27 September 2009	Seiffert Oval, Queanbeyan	T. Flynn
2010	(11) West Belconnen Warriors (R)	24 – 16	Queanbeyan United Blues (R)	19 September 2010	Seiffert Oval, Queanbeyan	T. Flynn
2011	(4) Woden Valley Rams (R)	18 – 12	Yass United Magpies (R)	11 September 2011	Seiffert Oval, Queanbeyan	T. Flynn
2012	(20) Queanbeyan United Blues (R)	26 – 22	Goulburn Workers Bulldogs (R)	23 September 2012	Seiffert Oval, Queanbeyan	H. Fallah
2013	(8) Queanbeyan Kangaroos (R)	20 – 10	Queanbeyan United Blues (R)	1 September 2013	Seiffert Oval, Queanbeyan	J. West
2014	(21) Queanbeyan United Blues (R)	22 – 14	West Belconnen Warriors (R)	7 September 2014	Seiffert Oval, Queanbeyan	J. West
2015	Tuggeranong Valley Bushrangers (R)	20 – 16	Queanbeyan United Blues (R)	6 September 2015	Seiffert Oval, Queanbeyan	J. West
2016	(22) Queanbeyan United Blues (R)	34 – 16	Tuggeranong Valley Bushrangers (R)	11 September 2016	Seiffert Oval, Queanbeyan	O. Levido
2017	(12) West Belconnen Warriors (R)	18 – 16	Queanbeyan United Blues (R)	3 September 2017	Seiffert Oval, Queanbeyan	A. Williams
2018	(13) West Belconnen Warriors (R)	24 – 16	Queanbeyan United Blues (R)	2 September 2018	Seiffert Oval, Queanbeyan	A. Williams
2019	(14) West Belconnen Warriors (R)	20 – 16	Queanbeyan Kangaroos (R)	8 September 2019	Seiffert Oval, Queanbeyan	A. Nightingale
CRRL Cup Reserve Grade (2020)
2020	(5) Woden Valley Rams (R)	22 – 4	University of Canberra Stars	27 September 2020	Seiffert Oval, Queanbeyan	A. Wheeler
Canberra Raiders Cup Reserve Grade (1998–19, 2021–Present)
2021	Competition Suspended Due to Covid-19
2022	(9) Queanbeyan Kangaroos (R)	24 – 22	Gungahlin Bulls (R)	18 September 2022	Seiffert Oval, Queanbeyan	B. McIntosh
2023	Gungahlin Bulls (R)	36 – 20	Tuggeranong Valley Bushrangers (R)	17 September 2023	Seiffert Oval, Queanbeyan	J. McManus
2024	(6) Woden Valley Rams (R)	32 – 26	Gungahlin Bulls (R)	8 September 2024	Seiffert Oval, Queanbeyan	O. Levido
2025	(2) Gungahlin Bulls (R)	14 – 4	Yass United Magpies (R)	13 September 2025	Seiffert Oval, Queanbeyan	A. Richardson
2026	(3) Yass United Magpies (R)	24 – 18	West Belconnen Warriors (R)	19 September 2026	Seiffert Oval, Queanbeyan	A. Richardson

=== Team performance ===
Team	Winners	Runners-up	Years won	Years runner-up
Queanbeyan United Blues (R)	22	17	1948, 1964, 1966, 1967, 1968, 1970, 1972, 1974, 1976, 1977, 1979, 1980, 1986, 1987, 1991, 2000, 2001, 2003, 2004, 2012, 2014, 2016	1961, 1965, 1971, 1973, 1975, 1978, 1981, 1983, 1989, 1995, 2005, 2006, 2010, 2013, 2015, 2017, 2018
West Belconnen Warriors (R)	14	10	1981, 1982, 1994, 1995, 1999, 2005, 2006, 2007, 2008, 2009, 2010, 2017, 2018, 2019	1984, 1990, 1993, 1996, 1998, 2000, 2001, 2002, 2014, 2026
Queanbeyan Kangaroos (R)	9	8	1969, 1971, 1984, 1988, 1989, 1990, 2002, 2013, 2022	1970, 1980, 1985, 1987, 1991, 1992, 1997, 2004, 2019
Woden Valley Rams (R)	6	4	1975, 1985, 1993, 2011, 2020, 2024	1976, 1986, 1988, 1999
Goulburn United Roosters (R)	4	2	1958, 1961, 1973, 1978	1962, 1964
Yass United Magpies (R)	3	7	1954, 1960, 2026	1953, 1958, 1959, 1969, 1981, 2011, 2025
Goulburn Workers Bulldogs (R)	3	7	1962, 1963, 1965	1966, 1967, 1968, 1979, 1982, 2009, 2012
Lakes United Sharks (R)	2	3	1976, 1977	1975, 1978, 1980
Gungahlin Bulls (R)	2	3	2023, 2025	1994, 2022, 2024
Captains Flat Redmen (R)	2	2	1956, 1959	1957, 1960
South Woden Saints (R)	2	1	1974, 1975	1979
Belconnen United Panthers (R)	2	1	1978, 1980	1976
Crookwell Green Devils (R)	2	0	1955, 1983	–
Tuggeranong United Buffaloes (R)	2	0	1996, 1997	–
Tuggeranong Valley Bushrangers (R)	1	5	2015	2003, 2007, 2008, 2016, 2023
Canberra Tigers (R)	1	2	1981	1972, 1977
Braidwood Bears	1	0	1950	–
Grabben Gullen Blues (R)	1	0	1953	–
North City (R)	1	0	1957	–
Gungahlin Gallopers (R)	1	0	1979	–
Goulburn Gladiators (R)	1	0	1992	–
Goulburn Stockmen (R)	1	0	1998	–
Goulburn (R)	0	3	–	1948, 1955, 1956,
Bungendore Tigers	0	2	–	1950, 1963
Burrinjuck (R)	0	1	–	1954
East Canberra United (R)	0	1	–	1974
North Canberra Bears (R)	0	1	–	1974
Weston Creek Rabbitohs (R)	0	1	–	1977
University of Canberra Stars	0	1	–	2020

== Under 18/19s Grand Final ==
Year	Premiers	Score	Runners-up	Match Information
Year	Premiers	Score	Runners-up	Date	Venue	Referee
Group 8 Junior Grade (1957–66)
1957	Captains Flat Redmen (U18s)	32 – 8	Goulburn (U18s)	8 September 1957	Manuka Oval, Canberra	J. McKie
1958	Queanbeyan United Blues (U18s)	11 – 10	Goulburn Workers (U18s)	12 October 1958	League Park, Goulburn	B. Ison
1959	Goulburn Workers (U18s)	7 – 0	Captains Flat Redmen (U18s)	27 September 1959	Gunning Showground, Gunning
1960	Goulburn United Roosters (U18s)	10 – 5	Queanbeyan United Blues (U18s)	25 September 1960	Queanbeyan Showground, Queanbeyan	J. McKie
1961	(2) Goulburn United Roosters (U18s)	8 – 7	Goulburn Workers (U18s)		Queanbeyan Showground, Queanbeyan
1962	(2) Goulburn Workers (U18s)	15 – 4	Goulburn United Roosters (U18s)	9 September 1962	League Park, Goulburn
1963	(3) Goulburn Workers (U18s)	14 – 3	Goulburn United Roosters (U18s)	29 September 1963	League Park, Goulburn	B. Chapman
1964	Canberra Workmen (U18s)	11 – 8	Goulburn United Roosters (U18s)	6 September 1964	Queanbeyan Showground, Queanbeyan	L. Boyton
1965	(3) Goulburn United Roosters (U18s)	15 – 5	Canberra Workmen (U18s)	3 October 1965	League Park, Goulburn	M. Whitby
1966	(4) Goulburn United Roosters (U18s)	17 – 6	Queanbeyan United Blues (U18s)	2 October 1966	Manuka Oval, Canberra	C. Keane
Group 8/9 Junior Grade (1967–70)
1967	(5) Goulburn United Roosters (U18s)	17 – 8	Young Cherrypickers (U18s)	24 September 1967	Seiffert Oval, Queanbeyan
1968	Young Cherrypickers (U18s)	7 – 2	Yass United Magpies (U18s)	22 September 1968	Seiffert Oval, Queanbeyan
1969	(2) Young Cherrypickers (U18s)	18 – 10	Goulburn United Roosters (U18s)	14 September 1969	Seiffert Oval, Queanbeyan	D. Tarbuck
1970	(3) Young Cherrypickers (U18s)	11 – 0	Queanbeyan United Blues (U18s)	27 September 1970	Seiffert Oval, Queanbeyan
Group 8 Under 19s (1971–73)
1971	(6) Goulburn United Roosters (U19s)	6 – 5	Canberra-Ainslie-Campbell Tigers (U19s)	12 September 1971	Seiffert Oval, Queanbeyan	M. Whitby
1972	(2) Queanbeyan United Blues (U19s)	17 – 14	East Canberra United (U19s)	24 September 1972	Seiffert Oval, Queanbeyan	N. Bissett
1973	(7) Goulburn United Roosters (U19s)	11 – 8	Queanbeyan United Blues (U19s)	16 September 1973	Seiffert Oval, Queanbeyan
Group 8 Under 18s (1974–79)
1974	(3) Queanbeyan United Blues (U18s)	19 – 9	Yass United Magpies (U18s)	22 September 1974	Seiffert Oval, Queanbeyan
1975	Yass United Magpies (U18s)	20 – 15	Queanbeyan United Blues (U18s)	31 August 1975	Seiffert Oval, Queanbeyan
1976	(8) Goulburn United Roosters (U18s)	20 – 14	Queanbeyan United Blues (U18s)	19 September 1976	Seiffert Oval, Queanbeyan
1977	(4) Queanbeyan United Blues (U18s)	13 – 12	Goulburn Workers (U18s)	21 August 1977	Seiffert Oval, Queanbeyan
1978	(5) Queanbeyan United Blues (U18s)	16 – 7	Crookwell Green Devils (U18s)	24 September 1978	Seiffert Oval, Queanbeyan
1979	West Belconnen Warriors (U18s)	22 – 15	Yass United Magpies (U18s)	16 September 1979	Seiffert Oval, Queanbeyan	D. Corey
Group 19 Under 18s (1975–79)
1975	Lakes United Sharks (U18s)	5 – 3	Belconnen United Panthers (U18s)	14 September 1975	Manuka Oval, Canberra
1976	(2) Lakes United Sharks (U18s)	26 – 2	Batemans Bay Tigers (U18s)	29 August 1976	Northbourne Oval, Canberra
1977	(3) Lakes United Sharks (U18s)	26 – 3	North Canberra Bears (U18s)	4 September 1977	Manuka Oval, Canberra
1978	No Competition
1979	Belconnen United Panthers (U18s)	24 – 5	Canberra Gallopers (U18s)	23 September 1979	Northbourne Oval, Canberra
CDRL Under 18s (1980–81)
1980	(9) Goulburn United Roosters (U18s)	14 – 12	West Belconnen Warriors (U18s)	27 September 1980	Northbourne Oval, Canberra	B. Jolly
1981	(2) West Belconnen Warriors (U18s)	32 – 0	Goulburn United Roosters (U18s)	13 September 1981	Seiffert Oval, Queanbeyan
ACTRL Under 18s (1980–81)
1980	Canberra Tigers (U18s)	22 – 7	Canberra Gallopers (U18s)	27 September 1980	Northbourne Oval, Canberra	C. Law
1981	(2) Canberra Tigers (U18s)	25 – 6	Yass United Magpies (U18s)	6 September 1981	Northbourne Oval, Canberra	B. Jolly
Molonglo Shield Under 18s (1982–85)
1982	Valleys United (U18s)	28 – 13	West Belconnen Warriors (U18s)	19 September 1982	Workers Arena, Goulburn	G. Jones
1983	(3) West Belconnen Warriors (U18s)	6 – 2	Goulburn United Roosters (U18s)	18 September 1983	Seiffert Oval, Queanbeyan	M. Sparks
1984	(2) Belconnen United Panthers (U18s)	16 – 12	Queanbeyan Kangaroos (U18s)	16 September 1984	Northbourne Oval, Canberra	J. Press
1985	Woden Valley Rams (U18s)	11 – 8	Queanbeyan Kangaroos (U18s)	8 September 1985	Northbourne Oval, Canberra	M. Sparks
Molonglo Shield Under 19s (1986–97)
1986	(3) Belconnen United Panthers (U19s)	12 – 0	Queanbeyan United Blues (U19s)	7 September 1986	Northbourne Oval, Canberra	P. Stuart
1987	(4) West Belconnen Warriors (U19s)	18 – 0	Woden Valley Rams (U19s)	30 August 1987	Northbourne Oval, Canberra	B. Keeley
1988	Belconnen United Sharks (U19s)	13 – 0	Queanbeyan United Blues (U19s)	28 August 1988	Northbourne Oval, Canberra	G. Eade
1989	(5) West Belconnen Warriors (U19s)	32 – 10	Queanbeyan Kangaroos (U19s)	17 September 1989	Northbourne Oval, Canberra	G. Jones
1990	(2) Belconnen United Sharks (U19s)	18 – 6	Queanbeyan Kangaroos (U19s)	15 September 1990	Seiffert Oval, Queanbeyan	G. Henderson
1991	(3) Belconnen United Sharks (U19s)	26 – 4	West Belconnen Warriors (U19s)	14 September 1991	Seiffert Oval, Queanbeyan	J. Elliott
1992	(6) West Belconnen Warriors (U19s)	16 – 4	Yass United Magpies (U19s)	13 September 1992	Seiffert Oval, Queanbeyan	S. Hart
1993	(7) West Belconnen Warriors (U19s)	21 – 8	Goulburn Gladiators (U19s)	12 September 1993	Seiffert Oval, Queanbeyan	B. Cummins
1994	Ginninderra Bulls (U19s)	16 – 8	Woden Valley Rams (U19s)	4 September 1994	Seiffert Oval, Queanbeyan	M. Harradine
1995	Valley Dragons (U19s)	16 – 12	West Belconnen Warriors (U19s)	17 September 1995	Seiffert Oval, Queanbeyan	M. Harradine
1996	(6) Queanbeyan United Blues (U19s)	26 – 16	Tuggeranong United Buffaloes (U19s)	8 September 1996	Seiffert Oval, Queanbeyan	C. Wilson
1997	Tuggeranong United Buffaloes (U19s)	16 – 6	West Belconnen Warriors (U19s)	16 September 1997	Seiffert Oval, Queanbeyan	M. Harradine
Canberra Raiders Cup Under 19s (1998–01, 2023–Present)
1998	(2) Tuggeranong United Buffaloes (U19s)	26 – 6	Queanbeyan Kangaroos (U19s)	13 September 1998	Seiffert Oval, Queanbeyan	B. Cobb
1999	Queanbeyan Kangaroos (U19s)	36 – 8	Tuggeranong United Buffaloes (U19s)	12 September 1999	Seiffert Oval, Queanbeyan	C. Wilson
2000	(7) Queanbeyan United Blues (U19s)	12 – 2	West Belconnen Warriors (U19s)	13 August 2000	Margaret Donoghoe Oval, Queanbeyan	C. Bonanno
2001	(8) West Belconnen Warriors (U19s)	22 – 10	Queanbeyan United Blues (U19s)	26 August 2001	Seiffert Oval, Queanbeyan	M. Laverty
Canberra Raiders Cup Under 18s (2002–10, 2016–18)
2002	Goulburn Stockmen (U18s)	21 – 20	Queanbeyan United Blues (U18s)	15 September 2002	Seiffert Oval, Queanbeyan	D. Feenan
2003	(2) Goulburn Stockmen (U18s)	44 – 12	Gungahlin Bulls (U18s)	31 August 2003	Seiffert Oval, Queanbeyan	R. Moore
2004	Tuggeranong Valley Bushrangers (U18s)	32 – 12	Gungahlin Bulls (U18s)	29 August 2004	Seiffert Oval, Queanbeyan	S. Johnson
2005	(8) Queanbeyan United Blues (U18s)	26 – 20	Yass United Magpies (U18s)	28 August 2005	Seiffert Oval, Queanbeyan	R. Moore
2006	(2) Tuggeranong Valley Bushrangers (U18s)	34 – 12	West Belconnen Warriors (U18s)	3 September 2006	Seiffert Oval, Queanbeyan	P. Henderson
2007	(9) Queanbeyan United Blues (U18s)	34 – 16	Tuggeranong Valley Bushrangers (U18s)	9 September 2007	Seiffert Oval, Queanbeyan	T. Flynn
2008	Gungahlin Bulls (U18s)	18 – 8	Tuggeranong Valley Bushrangers (U18s)	28 September 2008	Seiffert Oval, Queanbeyan	J. Tennent
2009	(4) Goulburn Workers Bulldogs (U18s)	26 – 24	Gungahlin Bulls (U18s)	27 September 2009	Seiffert Oval, Queanbeyan	P. Flynn
2010	(3) Tuggeranong Valley Bushrangers (U18s)	26 – 12	Belconnen United Scholars (U18s)	19 September 2010	Seiffert Oval, Queanbeyan	A. Williams
Canberra Raiders Cup Under 18s Division 1 (2011–15)
2011	(4) Tuggeranong Valley Bushrangers (U18s)	8 – 4	Belconnen United Scholars (U18s)	11 September 2011	Seiffert Oval, Queanbeyan	J. West
2012	Belconnen United Scholars (U18s)	26 – 20	Tuggeranong Valley Bushrangers (U18s)	23 September 2012	Seiffert Oval, Queanbeyan	M. Jones
2013	(5) Goulburn Workers Bulldogs (U18s)	36 – 20	Woden Valley Rams (U18s)	1 September 2013	Seiffert Oval, Queanbeyan	J. Gould
2014	(5) Tuggeranong Valley Bushrangers (U18s)	30 – 4	Belconnen United Scholars (U18s)	7 September 2014	Seiffert Oval, Queanbeyan	L. Wild
2015	(2) Woden Valley Rams (U18s)	24 – 14	West Belconnen Warriors (U18s)	6 September 2015	Seiffert Oval, Queanbeyan	O. Levido
Canberra Raiders Cup Under 18s (2002–10, 2016–18)
2016	(6) Tuggeranong Valley Bushrangers (U18s)	16 – 12	West Belconnen Warriors (U18s)	11 September 2016	Seiffert Oval, Queanbeyan	B. Savona
2017	(3) Woden Valley Rams (U18s)	18 – 16	Goulburn Workers Bulldogs (U18s)	3 September 2017	Seiffert Oval, Queanbeyan	A. Nightingale
2018	(10) Queanbeyan United Blues (U18s)	28 – 18	Goulburn Workers Bulldogs (U18s)	2 September 2018	Seiffert Oval, Queanbeyan	B. Seppala
Canberra Raiders Cup Under 19s Division 1 (2019–2022)
2019	(11) Queanbeyan United Blues (U19s)	26 – 10	Goulburn Workers Bulldogs (U19s)	8 September 2019	Seiffert Oval, Queanbeyan	E. Fernance
2020	No Competition Due to Covid-19
2021	Competition Suspended Due to Covid-19
2022	(12) Queanbeyan United Blues (U19s)	18 – 16	Gungahlin Bulls (U19s)	18 September 2022	Seiffert Oval, Queanbeyan	G. Miles
Canberra Raiders Cup Under 19s (1998–01, 2023–Present)
2023	(4) Woden Valley Rams (U19s)	42 – 18	West Belconnen Warriors (U19s)	17 September 2023	Seiffert Oval, Queanbeyan	T. Brooker
2024	(5) Woden Valley Rams (U19s)	34 – 12	Goulburn City Bulldogs (U19s)	8 September 2024	Seiffert Oval, Queanbeyan	L. Richardson
2025	Goulburn City Bulldogs (U19s)	22 – 4	Gungahlin Bulls (U19s)	13 September 2025	Seiffert Oval, Queanbeyan	H. Hall
2026	(9) West Belconnen Warriors (U19s)	46 – 12	Tuggeranong Valley Bushrangers (U19s)	19 September 2026	Seiffert Oval, Queanbeyan	B. Perrott

=== Team performance ===
Team	Winners	Runners-up	Years won	Years runner-up
Queanbeyan United Blues (U19s, U18s)	12	11	1958, 1972, 1974, 1977, 1978, 1996, 2000, 2005, 2007, 2018, 2019, 2022	1960, 1966, 1970, 1973, 1975, 1976, 1986, 1988, 2001, 2002, 2008
West Belconnen Warriors (U19s, U18s)	9	10	1979, 1981, 1983, 1987, 1989, 1992, 1993, 2001, 2026	1980, 1982, 1991, 1995, 1997, 2000, 2006, 2015, 2016, 2023
Goulburn United Roosters (U19s, U18s)	9	6	1960, 1961, 1965, 1966, 1967, 1971, 1973, 1976, 1980	1962, 1963, 1964, 1969, 1981, 1983
Tuggeranong Valley Bushrangers (U18s)	6	3	2004, 2006, 2010, 2011, 2014, 2016	2007, 2012, 2026
Goulburn Workers Bulldogs (U19s, U18s)	5	6	1959, 1962, 1963, 2009, 2013	1958, 1961, 1977, 2017, 2018, 2019
Woden Valley Rams (U19s, U18s)	5	3	1985, 2015, 2017, 2023, 2024	1987, 1994, 2013
Canberra Tigers (U19s, U18s)	3	2	1964, 1980, 1981	1965, 1971
Tuggeranong United Buffaloes (U19s, U18s)	3	2	1982, 1997, 1998	1996, 1999
Young Cherrypickers (U18s)	3	1	1968, 1969, 1970	1967
Belconnen United Panthers (U19s, U18s)	3	1	1979, 1984, 1986	1975
Lakes United Sharks (U18s)	3	0	1975, 1976, 1977	–
Belconnen United Sharks (1987–93) (U19s)	3	0	1988, 1990, 1991	–
Gungahlin Bulls (U19s, U18s)	2	5	1994, 2008	2003, 2004, 2009, 2022, 2025
Goulburn Stockmen (U18s)	2	0	2002, 2003	–
Yass United Magpies (U19s, U18s)	1	6	1975	1968, 1974, 1979, 1981, 1992, 2005
Queanbeyan Kangaroos (U19s, U18s)	1	5	1999	1984, 1985, 1989, 1990, 1998
Belconnen United Scholars (U18s)	1	3	2012	2010, 2011, 2014
Captains Flat Redmen (U18s)	1	1	1957	1959
Goulburn City Bulldogs (U19s)	1	1	2025	2024
Valley Dragons (U19s)	1	0	1995	–
Gungahlin Gallopers (U19s, U18s)	0	2	–	1979, 1980
Goulburn (U18s)	0	1	–	1957
Canberra Workmen Dragons (U18s)	0	1	–	1965
East Canberra United (U19s)	0	1	–	1972
Batemans Bay Tigers (U18s)	0	1	–	1976
North Canberra Bears (U18s)	0	1	–	1977
Crookwell Green Devils (U18s)	0	1	–	1978
Goulburn Gladiators (U19s)	0	1	–	1993

== Ladies League Tag Grand Finals ==
Year	Premiers	Score	Runners-up	Match Information
Year	Premiers	Score	Runners-up	Date	Venue	Referee
Canberra Raiders Cup Ladies League Tag (2016–19, 2021–Present)
2016	Belconnen United Sharks (LLT)	20 – 4	Tuggeranong Valley Bushrangers (LLT)	11 September 2016	Seiffert Oval, Queanbeyan	S. Cameron
2017	West Belconnen Warriors (LLT)	14 – 8	Goulburn Workers Bulldogs (LLT)	3 September 2017	Seiffert Oval, Queanbeyan	J. Bolton
2018	(2) West Belconnen Warriors (LLT)	10 – 4	Goulburn Workers Bulldogs (LLT)	2 September 2018	Seiffert Oval, Queanbeyan	A. Richardson
2019	(3) West Belconnen Warriors (LLT)	8 – 6	Goulburn Workers Bulldogs (LLT)	8 September 2019	Seiffert Oval, Queanbeyan	G. Miles
CRRL Cup Ladies League Tag (2020)
2020	Queanbeyan United Blues (LLT)	18 – 14	Gungahlin Bulls (LLT)	27 September 2020	Seiffert Oval, Queanbeyan	G. Miles
Canberra Raiders Cup Ladies League Tag (2016–19, 2021–Present)
2021	Competition Suspended Due to Covid-19
2022	Woden Valley Rams (LLT)	14 – 4	West Belconnen Warriors (LLT)	18 September 2022	Seiffert Oval, Queanbeyan	W. Perrott
2023	(2) Woden Valley Rams (LLT)	18 – 4	Gungahlin Bulls (LLT)	17 September 2023	Seiffert Oval, Queanbeyan	W. Perrott
2024	(3) Woden Valley Rams (LLT)	16 – 14	Gungahlin Bulls (LLT)	8 September 2024	Seiffert Oval, Queanbeyan	T. Herath
2025	Gungahlin Bulls (LLT)	10 – 0	Woden Valley Rams (LLT)	13 September 2025	Seiffert Oval, Queanbeyan	D. Elliott
2026	Gungahlin Bulls (LLT)	28 – 4	Woden Valley Rams (LLT)	19 September 2026	Seiffert Oval, Queanbeyan	B.Erickson

=== Team performance ===
Team	Winners	Runners-up	Years won	Years runner-up
West Belconnen Warriors (LLT)	3	1	2017, 2018, 2019	2022
Woden Valley Rams (LLT)	3	2	2022, 2023, 2024	2025, 2026
Gungahlin Bulls (LLT)	2	3	2025, 2026	2020, 2023, 2024
Belconnen United Sharks (LLT)	1	0	2016	–
Queanbeyan United Blues (LLT)	1	0	2020	–
Goulburn Workers Bulldogs (LLT)	0	3	–	2017, 2018, 2019
Tuggeranong Valley Bushrangers (LLT)	0	1	–	2016

== Women's Tackle Grand Finals ==
Year	Premiers	Score	Runners-up	Match Information
Year	Premiers	Score	Runners-up	Date	Venue	Referee
ACT Women's Premiership (1991–03)
1991	East Canberra Tigers (W)	16 – 0	Gungahlin Gallopers (W)	14 September 1991	Seiffert Oval, Queanbeyan	L. Hart
1992	(2) East Canberra Tigers (W)	24 – 6	Woden Valley Rams (W)	13 September 1992	Seiffert Oval, Queanbeyan	R. Luke
1993	(3) East Canberra Tigers (W)	42 – 0	West Belconnen Warriors (W)	12 September 1993	Seiffert Oval, Queanbeyan	R. Luke
1994	Canberra Breakaways (W)	14 – 8	Valley Dragons (W)	4 September 1994	Seiffert Oval, Queanbeyan	K. Hopkins
1995	Tuggeranong Castaways (W)	8 – 4	Woden Valley Rams (W)	2 September 1995	Seiffert Oval, Queanbeyan	B. Chapman
1996			Woden Valley Rams (W)			R. Luke
1997	Woden Valley Rams (W)	28 – 0	Sails Pirates (W)	30 August 1997	Boomanulla Oval, Canberra	D. Hall
1998	(2) Woden Valley Rams (W)	26 – 4	Northside Women's (W)	29 August 1998	Boomanulla Oval, Canberra	C. Nightingale
1999	Gungahlin Bulls (W)			12 September 1999	Seiffert Oval, Queanbeyan	D. Hall
2000	(2) Gungahlin Bulls (W)	def	Roos Castaways (W)	13 August 2000	Margaret Donohoe Oval, Queanbeyan	D. Hall
2001	(3) Gungahlin Bulls (W)	def	Queanbeyan Kangaroos (W)	26 August 2001	Seiffert Oval, Queanbeyan	K. Hopkins
2002	(4) Gungahlin Bulls (W)	14 – 12	Queanbeyan United Blues (W)	14 September 2002	Boomanulla Oval, Canberra	C. Nightingale
2003				31 August 2003	Seiffert Oval, Queanbeyan	B. Lane
2004	No Women's Competition
2005	No Women's Competition
2006	No Women's Competition
2007	No Women's Competition
2008	No Women's Competition
2009	No Women's Competition
2010	No Women's Competition
2011	No Women's Competition
2012	No Women's Competition
2013	No Women's Competition
2014	No Women's Competition
2015	No Women's Competition
2016	No Women's Competition
Katrina Fanning Shield (2017–present)
2017	Queanbeyan United Blues (W)	26 – 16	Goulburn Stockmen (W)	3 September 2017	Seiffert Oval, Queanbeyan	C. Nightingale
2018	Goulburn Stockmen (W)	20 – 8	Yass United Magpies (W)	2 September 2018	Seiffert Oval, Queanbeyan	E. Fernance
2019	Yass United Magpies (W)	18 – 8	Valley Dragons (W)	7 September 2019	GIO Stadium, Canberra	A. Blackman
2020	Bushpies (W)	22 – 12	Queanbeyan United Blues (W)	27 September 2020	Seiffert Oval, Queanbeyan	A. Blackman
2021	Competition Suspended Due to COVID-19
2022	(2) Yass United Magpies (W)	36 – 12	Woden Valley Rams (W)	18 September 2022	Seiffert Oval, Queanbeyan	K. Nightingale
2023	West Belconnen Warriors (W)	24 – 22	Yass United Magpies (W)	17 September 2023	Seiffert Oval, Queanbeyan	O. Levido
2024	(3) Yass United Magpies (W)	28 – 10	Gungahlin Bulls (W)	8 September 2024	Seiffert Oval, Queanbeyan	A. Blackman
2025	(2) West Belconnen Warriors (W)	40 – 6	Belconnen United Sharks (W)	13 September 2025	Seiffert Oval, Queanbeyan	W. Perrott
2026	Belconnen United Sharks (W)	20 – 14	Gungahlin Bulls (W)	19 September 2026	Seiffert Oval, Queanbeyan	T. Herath

=== Team performance ===
Team	Winners	Runners-up	Years won	Years runner-up
Gungahlin Bulls (W)	4	2	1999, 2000, 2001, 2002	2024, 2026
Yass United Magpies (W)	3	2	2019, 2022, 2024	2018, 2023
East Canberra Tigers (W)	3	0	1991, 1992, 1993	–
Woden Valley Rams (W)	2	3	1997, 1998	1992, 1995, 2022
West Belconnen Warriors (W)	2	1	2023, 2025	1993
Queanbeyan United Blues (W)	1	2	2017	2002, 2020
Goulburn Stockmen (W)	1	1	2018	2017
Belconnen United Sharks (W)	1	1	2026	2025
Canberra Breakaways (W)	1	0	1994	–
Tuggeranong Castaways (W)	1	0	1995	–
Bushpies (W)	1	0	2020	–
Valley Dragons (W)	0	2	–	1994, 2019
Gungahlin Gallopers (W)	0	1	–	1991
Sails Pirates (W)	0	1	–	1997
Northside Women's (W)	0	1	–	1998
Roos Castaways (W)	0	1	–	2000
Queanbeyan Kangaroos (W)	0	1	–	2001

== McIntyre Medal Winners (First Grade Player of the Year) ==
=== Award winners ===
Year	Player	Club
1986	Brett Coombs	West Belconnen Warriors
1987	Ian Baker	Queanbeyan Kangaroos
1988	Clyde Chatfield	Yass United Magpies
1989	Gary Kingham	West Belconnen Warriors
1990	Glenn Wood	East Canberra Tigers
1991	Tony Adam	West Belconnen Warriors
1991	Scott Griffiths	Belconnen United Sharks
1992	Scott Griffiths	Queanbeyan United Blues
1993	Chris Cuthbertson	Queanbeyan United Blues
1994	Michael Mantelli	Queanbeyan Kangaroos
1995	David Gray	Queanbeyan United Blues
1995	Craig Breen	West Belconnen Warriors
1995	Troy Clear	West Belconnen Warriors
1996	Brendan Norton	Woden Valley Rams
1997	Robert Daniel	Woden Valley Rams
1998	Dallas Yow Yeh	Queanbeyan United Blues
1999	Nick Stanton	Tuggeranong United Buffaloes
1999	Andrew Theuma	Cooma United Stallions
2000	Nick Stanton	Tuggeranong United Buffaloes
2001	Nick Stanton	Gungahlin Bulls
2002	Adam Peters	West Belconnen Warriors
2003	Richie Allan	Gungahlin Bulls
2004	Michael Mondo	Tuggeranong Valley Bushrangers
2005	Brenton Lawrence	Tuggeranong Valley Bushrangers
2006	Tim Donovan	North Belconnen Scholars
2007	Ben Nicoll	Tuggeranong Valley Bushrangers
2007	Luke Gray	West Belconnen Warriors
2008	Michael Dodson	Goulburn Workers Bulldogs
2008	Brenton Lawrence	Woden Valley Rams
2009	Liam Taylor	West Belconnen Warriors
2010	Mathew Gafa	Belconnen United Scholars
2011	Steve McLean	Queanbeyan United Blues
2012	Brent Crisp	Belconnen United Scholars
2012	Michael Dodson	Goulburn Workers Bulldogs
2013	Daniel York	Goulburn Workers Bulldogs
2014	Jordan Macey	Queanbeyan Kangaroos
2015	Jack Miller	Queanbeyan Kangaroos
2016	Robert Roberts	West Belconnen Warriors
2017	Brent Crisp	Queanbeyan Kangaroos
2018	Tom Warner	Yass United Magpies
2018	Michael Gilmour	Woden Valley Rams
2019	Mitchell Cornish	Goulburn Workers Bulldogs
2020	Mitchel Souter	Canberra Raiders (U20s)
2020	Jordan Williams	Canberra Raiders (U20s)
2020	Brayden Robertson	Woden Valley Rams
2021	Joshua Ayers	West Belconnen Warriors
2021	Tre Holten-Williams	Gungahlin Bulls
2022	Terry Campese	Queanbeyan United Blues
2023	Sam Williams	Queanbeyan Kangaroos
2024	Dylan McLachlan	Queanbeyan United Blues
2025	Darby Medlyn	Tuggeranong Valley Bushrangers
2026	Jamie Mazzarol Kotz	Queanbeyan United Blues

==== Multiple Winners ====
Player	Won	Club(s)	Years
Nick Stanton	3	Tuggeranong United Buffaloes	1999, 2000
Nick Stanton	3	Gungahlin Bulls	2001
Scott Griffiths	2	Belconnen United Sharks	1991
Scott Griffiths	2	Queanbeyan United Blues	1992
Brenton Lawrence	2	Tuggeranong Valley Bushrangers	2005
Brenton Lawrence	2	Woden Valley Rams	2008
Michael Dodson	2	Goulburn Workers Bulldogs	2008, 2012
Brent Crisp	2	Belconnen United Scholars	2012
Brent Crisp	2	Queanbeyan Kangaroos	2017

=== Seasons ===
- 2016 Canberra Rugby League
- 2017 Canberra Rugby League
- 2018 Canberra Rugby League
- 2019 Canberra Rugby League
- 2020 Canberra Rugby League
- 2021 Canberra Rugby League

== Historic Competitions ==
=== Group 8 Second Division/Crookwell RL ===
==== Clubs ====
- Argyle
- Bigga
- Binda
- Braidwood
- Grabben Gullen
- Gunning
- Laggan
- Marulan
- Taralga

== See also ==
- George Tooke Shield
