= Buser =

Buser is a surname. Notable people with the surname include:

- Alfred L. Buser (1888–1956), American football player and coach
- Eduard Buser (1913–?), Swiss footballer
- Felix Buser (born 1957), Swiss sprint canoer
- Gustav Buser, Swiss footballer
- Hans Buser (1513–1544), Swiss nobleman
- James Buser (born 1979), Australian rugby league footballer
- Johan Büser (born 1983). Swedish politician
- Jürg Peter Buser (born 1946), Swiss mathematician
- Martin Buser (born 1958), Swiss-born American sled dog racer
- Michael Buser (born 1952), American judge
- Paul Buser (born 1934), Swiss sports shooter
- Walter Buser (1926–2019), Swiss politician

== See also ==
- Butzer (surname), another surname
