= 2020 Canberra Rugby League =

Canberra Rugby League 2020

2020 Canberra Raiders Cup
- Duration: 25 July – 27 September 2020
- Teams: 4
- Broadcast partners: Bar TV Sports

The 2020 Canberra Rugby League will be the 1st season of the cup, the top division Rugby League club competition in Canberra. The 2020 competition was renamed due to the competition being given amateur status for 2020. The 2020 CRRL Cup will consist of 9 regular season rounds that will begin on the 25th of July and end on the 20th of September. There will be a Grand Final to decide the premiers, which will be played on the 27th of September. Queanbeyan United Blues are the defending premiers.

== Teams ==
There will be 4 teams playing in 2020, 5 less than 2019 due to the COVID-19 pandemic. there will be 3 teams from Canberra and 1 from Queanbeyan

Colours	Club	Season	Home ground(s)	Head coach
	Canberra Raiders U20s	1st season	N/A	Ash Barnes
	Gungahlin Bulls	27th season	Gungahlin Enclosed Oval, Nicholls Oval	Neil Bijorac
	Queanbeyan United Blues	81st season	Seiffert Oval	Terry Campese
	Woden Valley Rams	50th season	Phillip Oval	Ken Nagas

3 of the 4 clubs will field a team in the reserve grade competition.

=== Ladder ===
Pos	Team	Pld	W	D	L	PF	PA	PD	Pts
1	Canberra Raiders U20s	8	7	0	1	256	134	+122	14
2	Gungahlin Bulls	8	4	0	4	216	177	+39	8
3	Woden Valley Rams	8	3	0	5	177	186	−9	6
4	Queanbeyan United Blues	8	2	0	6	135	287	−152	4

Updated to match(es) played on 19 September. Source:
Rules for classification: 1) points; 2) point difference; 3) points scored

==== Ladder Progression ====
- Numbers highlighted in green indicate that the team finished the round inside the top 2.
- Numbers highlighted in blue indicates the team finished first on the ladder in that round.
- Numbers highlighted in red indicates the team finished last place on the ladder in that round.

Pos	Team	1	2	3	4	5	6	7	8	9
1	Canberra Raiders U20s	2	4	6	8	8	8	10	12	14
2	Gungahlin Bulls	0	0	0	2	2	4	6	8	8
3	Woden Valley Rams	0	2	2	2	2	4	4	4	6
4	Queanbeyan United Blues	2	2	4	4	4	4	4	4	4

=== Season Results ===
==== Round 1 ====
Home	Score	Away	Match Information
Home	Score	Away	Date and Time	Venue	Referee
Queanbeyan United Blues	25 – 18	Gungahlin Bulls	Saturday, 25 July 3:00pm	Seiffert Oval	James Charman
Woden Valley Rams	16 – 28	Canberra Raiders U20s	Saturday, 25 July 3:00pm	Phillip Oval	James Gould

==== Round 2 ====
Home	Score	Away	Match Information
Home	Score	Away	Date and Time	Venue	Referee
Queanbeyan United Blues	12 – 38	Canberra Raiders U20s	Saturday, 1 August 2:00pm	Seiffert Oval	Andrew Nightingale
Gungahlin Bulls	8 – 16	Woden Valley Rams	Saturday, 1 August 2:00pm	Gungahlin Enclosed Oval	James Gould

==== Round 3 ====
Home	Score	Away	Match Information
Home	Score	Away	Date and Time	Venue	Referee
Gungahlin Bulls	8 – 28	Canberra Raiders U20s	Saturday, 8 August 3:00pm	Nicholls Oval	Andrew Nightingale
Woden Valley Rams	14 – 18	Queanbeyan United Blues	Saturday, 8 August 3:00pm	Phillip Oval	Andrew Wheeler

==== Round 4 ====
Home	Score	Away	Match Information
Home	Score	Away	Date and Time	Venue	Referee
Gungahlin Bulls	32 – 10	Queanbeyan United Blues	Saturday, 15 August 3:00pm	Gungahlin Enclosed Oval	James Gould
Woden Valley Rams	8 – 20	Canberra Raiders U20s	Saturday, 15 August 3:00pm	Phillip Oval	Housh Fallah

==== Round 5 ====
Home	Score	Away	Match Information
Home	Score	Away	Date and Time	Venue	Referee
Woden Valley Rams	Cancelled	Gungahlin Bulls	Saturday, 22 August 3:00pm	Old Raiders HQ	N/A
Queanbeyan United Blues	Cancelled	Canberra Raiders U20s	Saturday, 22 August 3:00pm	Seiffert Oval	N/A

==== Round 6 ====
Home	Score	Away	Match Information
Home	Score	Away	Date and Time	Venue	Referee
Gungahlin Bulls	34 – 18	Canberra Raiders U20s	Saturday, 29 August 3:00pm	Raiders Belconnen	Andrew Nightingale
Woden Valley Rams	52 – 30	Queanbeyan United Blues	Sunday, 30 August 3:00pm	Phillip Oval	Andrew Wheeler

==== Round 7 ====
Home	Score	Away	Match Information
Home	Score	Away	Date and Time	Venue	Referee
Queanbeyan United Blues	14 – 54	Gungahlin Bulls	Saturday, 5 September 3:00pm	Seiffert Oval	Andrew Nightingale
Woden Valley Rams	22 – 28	Canberra Raiders U20s	Saturday, 5 September 3:00pm	Phillip Oval	James Gould

==== Round 8 ====
Home	Score	Away	Match Information
Home	Score	Away	Date and Time	Venue	Referee
Gungahlin Bulls	34 – 20	Woden Valley Rams	Saturday, 12 September 3:00pm	Gungahlin Enclosed Oval	Housh Fallah
Queanbeyan United Blues	6 – 50	Canberra Raiders U20s	Saturday, 12 September 3:00pm	Seiffert Oval	Andrew Nightingale

==== Round 9 ====
Home	Score	Away	Match Information
Home	Score	Away	Date and Time	Venue	Referee
Gungahlin Bulls	28 – 46	Canberra Raiders U20s	Saturday, 19 September 3:00pm	Gungahlin Enclosed Oval	Andrew Nightingale
Queanbeyan United Blues	20 – 29	Woden Valley Rams	Saturday, 19 September 3:00pm	Seiffert Oval	Andrew Wheeler

==== Grand Final ====
Home	Score	Away	Match Information
Home	Score	Away	Date and Time	Venue	Referee
Grand Final
Canberra Raiders U20s	66 – 10	Gungahlin Bulls	Sunday, 27 September 3:00pm	Seiffert Oval	Andrew Nightingale

== George Tooke Shield (Second Division) ==
=== Teams ===
2020 George Tooke Shield
- Duration: 25 July – 27 September 2020
- Teams: 4
- Broadcast partners: Bar TV Sports

Colours	Club	Season	Home ground(s)	Head coach
	Bungendore Tigers	55th season	Mick Sherd Oval	Mark Hogan
	Burrangong Bears	1st season	Cranfield Oval, Boorowa Showground	Barry Edwards
	Gordon Highlanders	6th season	North Park	John Sykes
	Gunning Roos	23rd season	Gunning Showground	Paul Loughhead

=== Ladder ===
Pos	Team	Pld	W	D	L	PF	PA	PD	Pts
1	Bungendore Tigers	9	6	2	1	224	110	+114	14
2	Gordon Highlanders	9	5	2	2	166	76	+90	12
3	Gunning Roos	9	5	0	4	210	110	+100	10
4	Burrangong Bears	9	0	0	9	42	346	−304	0

Updated to match(es) played on 19 September. Source:
Rules for classification: 1) points; 2) point difference; 3) points scored

==== Ladder Progression ====
- Numbers highlighted in green indicate that the team finished the round inside the top 2.
- Numbers highlighted in blue indicates the team finished first on the ladder in that round.
- Numbers highlighted in red indicates the team finished last place on the ladder in that round.

Pos	Team	1	2	3	4	5	6	7	8	9
1	Bungendore Tigers	2	4	5	7	7	8	10	12	14
2	Gordon Highlanders	2	4	5	7	9	10	10	12	12
3	Gunning Roos	0	0	2	2	4	6	8	8	10
4	Burrangong Bears	0	0	0	0	0	0	0	0	0

=== Season Results ===
==== Round 1 ====
Home	Score	Away	Match Information
Home	Score	Away	Date and Time	Venue	Referee
Bungendore Tigers	72 – 12	Burrangong Bears	Saturday, 25 July 2:30pm	Mick Sherd Oval	Jason McManus
Gordon Highlanders	22 – 14	Gunning Roos	Sunday, 26 July 2:00pm	North Park	Steve Brain

==== Round 2 ====
Home	Score	Away	Match Information
Home	Score	Away	Date and Time	Venue	Referee
Burrangong Bears	0 – 74	Gordon Highlanders	Saturday, 1 August 2:00pm	Cranfield Oval	Michael Madgwick
Gunning Roos	12 – 24	Bungendore Tigers	Saturday, 1 August 2:00pm	Gunning Showground	Garth Widdowson

==== Round 3 ====
Home	Score	Away	Match Information
Home	Score	Away	Date and Time	Venue	Referee
Gunning Roos	46 – 0	Burrangong Bears	Saturday, 8 August 2:00pm	Gunning Showground	Luke Barrow
Gordon Highlanders	Cancelled	Bungendore Tigers	Sunday, 9 August 2:00pm	North Park	N/A

==== Round 4 ====
Home	Score	Away	Match Information
Home	Score	Away	Date and Time	Venue	Referee
Burrangong Bears	8 – 20	Bungendore Tigers	Saturday, 15 August 2:00pm	Boorowa Showground	Dave Charman
Gordon Highlanders	10 – 8	Gunning Roos	Sunday, 16 August 3:00pm	North Park	Jason McManus

==== Round 5 ====
Home	Score	Away	Match Information
Home	Score	Away	Date and Time	Venue	Referee
Bungendore Tigers	10 – 14	Gunning Roos	Saturday, 22 August 2:30pm	Mick Sherd Oval	Luke Barrow
Burrangong Bears	0 – 6	Gordon Highlanders	Sunday, 23 August 2:00pm	Boorowa Showground	Timothy Bailey

==== Round 6 ====
Home	Score	Away	Match Information
Home	Score	Away	Date and Time	Venue	Referee
Gunning Roos	50 – 10	Burrangong Bears	Saturday, 29 August 2:00pm	Boorowa Showground	James Charman
Bungendore Tigers	24 – 24	Gordon Highlanders	Saturday, 29 August 2:30pm	Mick Sherd Oval	Garth Widdowson

==== Round 7 ====
Home	Score	Away	Match Information
Home	Score	Away	Date and Time	Venue	Referee
Burrangong Bears	12 – 36	Bungendore Tigers	Saturday, 5 September 2:00pm	Cranfield Oval	Troy Newham
Gunning Roos	14 – 12	Gordon Highlanders	Saturday, 5 September 2:00pm	Gunning Showground	Dave Charman

==== Round 8 ====
Home	Score	Away	Match Information
Home	Score	Away	Date and Time	Venue	Referee
Gunning Roos	16 – 22	Bungendore Tigers	Saturday, 12 September 2:00pm	Gunning Showground	Luke Barrow
Gordon Highlanders	6 – 0*	Burrangong Bears	Sunday, 13 September 2:00pm	North Park	N/A

==== Round 9 ====
Home	Score	Away	Match Information
Home	Score	Away	Date and Time	Venue	Referee
Bungendore Tigers	16 – 12	Gordon Highlanders	Saturday, 19 September 2:00pm	Mick Sherd Oval	Luke Barrow
Burrangong Bears	0 – 36	Gunning Roos	Saturday, 19 September 2:00pm	Cranfield Oval	Michael Madgwick

==== Grand Final ====
Home	Score	Away	Match Information
Home	Score	Away	Date and Time	Venue	Referee
Grand Final
Bungendore Tigers	10 – 24	Gordon Highlanders	Saturday, 26 September 1:15pm	Mick Sherd Oval	Luke Barrow

== Lower Grade Competition Results ==
=== Reserve Grade ===
==== Ladder ====
Pos	Team	Pld	W	D	L	PF	PA	PD	Pts
1	Woden Valley Rams RG	8	6	0	2	134	90	+44	12
2	University of Canberra Stars	8	5	0	3	174	100	+74	10
3	Queanbeyan United Blues RG	8	4	0	4	130	98	+32	8
4	Gungahlin Bulls RG	8	1	0	7	68	218	−150	2

Updated to match(es) played on 19 September. Source:
Rules for classification: 1) points; 2) point difference; 3) points scored

==== Grand Final ====
Home	Score	Away	Match Information
Home	Score	Away	Date and Time	Venue	Referee
Grand Final
Woden Valley Rams RG	22 – 6	University of Canberra Stars	Sunday, 27 September 1:15pm	Seiffert Oval	Andrew Wheeler

=== Ladies League Tag ===
==== Ladder ====
Pos	Team	Pld	W	D	L	PF	PA	PD	Pts
1	Gungahlin Bulls LLT	8	7	0	1	274	32	+242	14
2	Queanbeyan United Blues LLT	8	6	0	2	169	88	+81	12
3	Woden Valley Rams LLT	8	3	0	5	138	111	+27	6
4	University of Canberra Stars LLT	8	0	0	8	8	358	−350	0

Updated to match(es) played on 19 September. Source:
Rules for classification: 1) points; 2) point difference; 3) points scored

==== Grand Final ====
Home	Score	Away	Match Information
Home	Score	Away	Date and Time	Venue	Referee
Grand Final
Gungahlin Bulls LLT	14 – 18	Queanbeyan United Blues LLT	Sunday, 27 September 9:45am	Seiffert Oval	Gage Miles

=== Ladies League Tag Second Division ===
==== Ladder ====
Pos	Team	Pld	W	D	L	PF	PA	PD	Pts
1	Bungendore Tigerettes 1	9	9	0	0	270	61	+209	18
2	Burrangong Bears LLT	9	6	0	3	185	140	+45	12
3	Gunning Rooettes	9	3	0	6	108	172	−64	6
4	Bungendore Tigerettes 2	9	0	0	9	60	250	−190	0

Updated to match(es) played on 19 September. Source:
Rules for classification: 1) points; 2) point difference; 3) points scored

==== Grand Final ====
Home	Score	Away	Match Information
Home	Score	Away	Date and Time	Venue	Referee
Grand Final
Bungendore Tigerettes 1	14 – 20	Burrangong Bears LLT	Saturday, 26 September 11:45am	Mick Sherd Oval	Aidan Richardson

=== Women's ===
==== Ladder ====
Pos	Team	Pld	W	D	L	PF	PA	PD	Pts
1	Queanbeyan United Blues W	8	7	0	1	274	60	+214	14
2	Bushpies	8	6	0	2	204	60	+144	12
3	Tuggeranong Buffaloes W	8	3	0	5	130	134	−4	6
4	West Belconnen Warriors W	8	0	0	8	0	354	−354	0

Updated to match(es) played on 19 September. Source:
Rules for classification: 1) points; 2) point difference; 3) points scored

==== Grand Final ====
Home	Score	Away	Match Information
Home	Score	Away	Date and Time	Venue	Referee
Grand Final
Queanbeyan United Blues W	12 – 22	Bushpies	Sunday, 27 September 11:30am	Seiffert Oval	Angus Blackman

== Junior Competition Results ==
Competition	Home	Score	Away	Match Information
Competition	Home	Score	Away	Date and Time	Venue	Referee
Grand finals
Under 18's: Girls	Goulburn Stockmen U18s Girls	24 – 4	Gungahlin Bulls U18s Girls	Friday, 25 September 6:00pm	Workers Arena	Geordie Doherty
Under 17's	Queanbeyan United Blues U17s	26 – 14	Goulburn Stockmen U17s	Friday, 25 September 7:30pm	Seiffert Oval	Gage Miles
Under 16's: Division 1	Belconnen United Sharks U16s	12 – 14	Woden Weston Rams U16s	Friday, 25 September 6:00pm	Seiffert Oval	Dave Charman
Under 16's: Division 2	Goulburn Stockmen U16s	30 – 6	Cooma Colts U16s	Friday, 25 September 7:30pm	Workers Arena	Liam Richardson
Under 15's: Division 1	Woden Weston Rams U15s Blue	38 – 4	Yass Magpies U15s	Sunday, 27 September 10:15am	Curtin Playing Fields	Aidan Richardson
Under 15's: Division 2	West Belconnen Warriors U15s	18 – 26	Gungahlin Bulls U15s	Sunday, 27 September 2:00pm	Higgins Oval	Daniel Wheeler
Under 15's: Girls	Cooma Colts U15s Girls	14 – 4	West Belconnen Warriors U15s Girls	Sunday, 27 September 12:45pm	Melba Playing Fields	Mario Prpic
Under 14's: Division 1	Belconnen United Sharks U14s	32 – 10	Queanbeyan United Blues U14s	Sunday, 27 September 10:15am	Melba Playing Fields	Jason Severs
Under 14's: Division 2	Woden Weston Rams U14s	12 – 18	West Belconnen Warriors U14s Green	Sunday, 27 September 9:00am	Curtin Playing Fields	Juliana Donaldson
Under 13's: Division 1	Goulburn Stockmen U13s Blue	38 – 6	Gungahlin Bulls U13s	Sunday, 27 September 12:45pm	Higgins Oval	Isaac McCook
Under 13's: Division 2	West Belconnen Warriors U13s Blue	22 – 24	Cooma Colts U13s	Sunday, 27 September 10:15am	Higgins Oval	Jessica Charman
Under 13's: Division 3	Crookwell Green Devils U13s	36 – 22	Yass Magpies U13s	Sunday, 27 September 9:00am	Higgins Oval	Michael Bayley
