= Boser =

Boser is a surname of German origin. Notable people with the surname include:

- Friedrich Boser (1811–1881), German artist
- Sandra Boser (born 1976), German politician
- Tanner Boser (born 1991), Canadian mixed martial arts fighter

== See also ==
- Buser
