= Butzer (surname) =

Butzer is a German surname. Notable people with the surname include:

- Martin Bucer or Butzer (1491–1551), Protestant reformer
- André Butzer (born 1973), German artist
- Karl Butzer (1934–2016), American geographer
- Paul Butzer (1928–2026), German mathematician

== See also ==
- Butz
- Butser (disambiguation)
- Putzer, a surname
- Stefan Bützer (born 1965), Swiss footballer
