= Putzer =

Putzer or Pützer is a German language habitational surname. Notable people with the name include:

- Friedrich Pützer (1871–1922), German architect and urban planner
- Joseph Putzer (1836–1904), Austrian Redemptorist theologian
- Karen Putzer (1978), former Italian alpine skier
