= James Buser =

Australian rugby league footballer

Personal information
- Born: 30 August 1979 (age 45)

Playing information
Club
Years	Team	Pld	T	G	FG	P
2002	Canberra Raiders	2	1	0	0	4

James Buser (born 30 August 1979) is an Australian former professional rugby league footballer who played for the Canberra Raiders in the National Rugby League.

== Playing career ==
Buser made two first-grade appearances for Canberra, both in the 2002 NRL season. A West Belconnen player, he debuted in Canberra's round 16 win over the Penrith Panthers at Bruce Stadium, coming off the bench to score a try. He played again in the following round, a loss to the Sydney Roosters at Sydney Football Stadium.
