= Anthony Konings =

Anthony Konings (24 August 1821 in Helmond, Netherlands – 30 June 1884) was a Redemptorist professor, who wrote works of theology which influenced Catholic life in late nineteenth century America.

== Biography ==
After a course in humanities he entered the diocesan seminary. Feeling a call to the monastic life, after mature deliberation he entered in 1842 the Redemptorist novitiate at St. Trond, Belgium, and was permitted to make his religious profession on 6 November 1845. His superiors sent him at once to the house of higher studies to afford him time to prepare for the work of teaching. He was ordained priest in Wittem, on 21 December 1884 (1854??). After being engaged for some time as teacher of humanities in the preparatory college of the congregation, he was called to fill the chair of moral theology and later that of canon law. Whilst holding these posts, he was appointed prefect of students, a most important office in the congregation.

For some time he was also master of novices, and accompanied the provincial, Victor-Auguste-Isidor Deschamps, to Rome. Later he visited Rome a second time to take part in the general chapter of 1855, which united all the different provinces and decided upon Rome as the residence of the Superior General of the order. Konings was appointed rector of Amsterdam, and in 1860 of the house of studies at Wittem, which post he continued to occupy until 1865, when he was appointed Provincial of Holland. In 1870 he was sent to the province of Baltimore to take up the work of teaching moral theology and canon law to the young clerics of the Redemptorist house of studies at Ilchester, Maryland. As professor of moral theology he soon felt the need of a suitable textbook, less voluminous than the old manuals and one more adapted to the peculiar conditions existing in North America. Konings thereupon undertook the task of writing such a handbook, which he subsequently published in two volumes (Boston, 1874).

This work, based on the moral theology of Jean-Pierre Gury, was greeted with approval on its appearance, for the simplicity of its language and its presentation of the ideas of theologian Alphonsus Liguori, founder of the Redemptorists. He was the first to give a methodical exposition of the views of Liguori regarding what the latter called "equiprobabilism". He also applied his knowledge of American law to the subject. Later, at the suggestion of Tobias Mullen, Bishop of Erie, Pennsylvania, he published a commentary on episcopal faculties (intended for the United States), a work which was afterwards revised and enlarged by Joseph Putzer. In addition to these works he published several smaller books on various theological subjects. De Absolutione Parentibus, etc., his pamphlet, despite strong opposition, was taken by the Holy Office as the basis of an Instruction to the bishops of the United States. As a matter of fact the very words of Konings were employed in the Instruction sent by the Pope and incorporated in the Acts et Decreta Concilii Plenarii Baltimorensis tertii (a document for the third of the Plenary Councils of Baltimore). This Instruction absolved Catholic parents in the US who sent their children to the public schools - a tricky issue at the time. The gist of his pamphlet is found in his Moral Theology.

Konings was consulted by prelates and priests from the entire United States; he was invited to examine candidates for degrees in theology and canon law, and was summoned as an expert in trials touching ecclesiastical questions, especially in the celebrated trial resulting from the financial difficulties of the Archbishop of Cincinnati, J. B. Purcell. His last charge was that of prefect of the second novitiate, in which the Redemptorist priests immediately after ordination were trained for the Apostolic work of the missions. Whilst occupying this post, he fell seriously ill and died. His obituary in the Freeman's Journal (12 July 1884) described him as "a profound theologian, and a true exponent of St. Alphonsus."

== Published works ==
- Theologia Moralis, two editions by Konings and two by H. Kuper, C.SS.R.;
- Commentarium in Facultates Apostolicas (New York, 1884);
- De Absolutione Parentibus qui prolem scholis publicis seu promiscuis instituendam tradunt neganda necne (Boston, 1874);
- Bulla Jubilæi 1875 cum notis practicis (New York, 1875);
- SS. D. N. Leonis XIII Litteræ Apostolicæ quibus extraordinarium Jubilæum indicitur in usum cleri notis practicis illustratæ (2 editions, New York, 1881);
- General Confession Made Easy (New York, 1879), and in German Die Generalbeichte erleichtert;
- Theologia Moralis Fundamentalis seu Tractatus de Actibus Humanis (New York, 1882);
- Verordningen voor de Missien en andere apostolische Werkzaamheden
- Left in manuscript: Introductio in Jus Canonicum (Introduction to Canon Law); Compendium Juris Canonici; De Jure Regularium; and a complete set of cases in moral theology (Latin) for American students, some of which were published over the initial "R" in The Pastor, edited by W.J. Wiseman.
