= Joseph Putzer =

Austrian Redemptorist theologian and canonist

Joseph Putzer (4 March 1836, Rodeneck, County of Tyrol, Austrian Empire - 15 May 1904, Ilchester, Maryland, USA) was an Austrian Redemptorist theologian and canonist.

== Life ==
He entered the Congregation of the Most Holy Redeemer and made his religious profession, 14 August 1856. Having finished his theological studies at Mautern, Austria, he was ordained 7 August 1859.

He arrived in New York, 7 August 1876, was assigned to St. Alphonsus', Baltimore, until 1880, and was occupied in parish work at St. Michael's church until 1884, when he was chosen Superior of St. Mary's, Buffalo, New York. In 1887, he was called to Ilchester, Maryland, to occupy the chair of moral theology and canon law.

His opinion was constantly sought on questions of theology and canon law; he wrote frequently for periodicals and journals, generally signing his articles: "J.P."

== Works ==
He is best known by his Commentarium in Facultates Apostolicas, five editions, first undertaken by Anthony Konings. Putzer revised and enlarged it into practically a new work. On its appearance the "Civiltà Cattolica" (7 Oct., 1893) and "Il Monitore" (31 Aug., 1897) among others praised its clearness, depth, precision, and learning.

Putzer also published an Instructio de confessariis religiosorum exemptorum (two editions) and Jubilæum anni 1901 — Commentarium. He left many unpublished manuscripts.

== Footnotes ==
- Provincial and Domestic Chronicles; American Ecclesiastical Review (Philadelphia, 1904), XXX, 614.
- The Catholic Church in the U.S. (New York, 1908) I, 239.
- Mader, Die Redemptoristen in Oesterreich (Vienna, 1887).
- Nord Amerika (Philadelphia, 26 May 1904).
