= Michael Buser =

American judge

Judge of the Kansas Court of Appeals
- In office January 2005 – January 31, 2022
- Governor: Kathleen Sebelius
- Succeeded by: Angela D. Coble

Personal details
- Born: Michael B. Buser; January 10, 1952 (age 73); Kansas City, Missouri, U.S.
- Children: 2
- Education: Georgetown University; University of Kansas School of Law (JD)
- Profession: Judge

Michael B. Buser (born January 10, 1952) is a judge of the Kansas Court of Appeals. He was appointed to this position in January 2005 by Governor Sebelius.

== Biography ==
Judge Buser was born on January 10, 1952, in Kansas City, Missouri. He graduated from Georgetown University in 1974 with degrees in theology and American government. He went on to receive his J.D. degree from the University of Kansas School of Law in 1977. He is now married and has two sons.

== Legal career ==
Judge Buser began his legal career in 1977 as an assistant district attorney in Johnson County. In 1988, he became the general attorney for the Union Pacific Railroad. He then joined the law firm Shook, Hardy and Bacon in 1991 and worked in the firm's tort and pharmaceutical practice groups until his appointment to the Court of Appeals.
