= Butser =

Butser may refer to

- Butser Hill
- Butser Ancient Farm
