= Queanbeyan Showground =

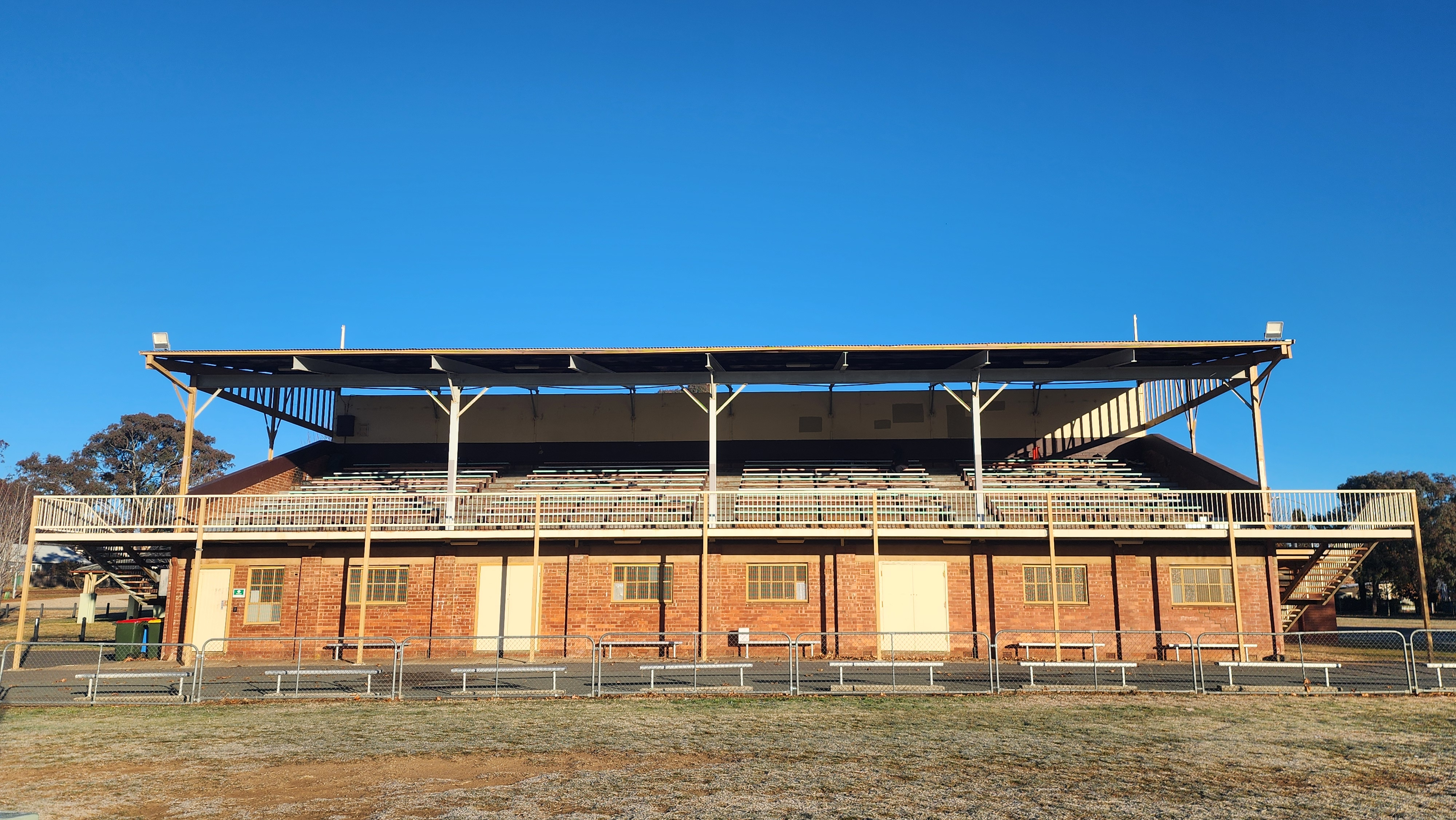
- Grandstand

- Location within New South Wales Location within Australia
- 35.3566°S 149.2307°E
- Location: 19-41 Farrer Place, Queanbeyan, Queanbeyan-Palerang Region, New South Wales, Australia

Site notes
- Owner: Queanbeyan City Council

New South Wales Heritage Register
- Official name: Queanbeyan Showground
- Type: state heritage (complex / group)
- Designated: 15 March 2013
- Reference no.: 1890
- Type: Other - Landscape - Cultural
- Category: Aboriginal

Queanbeyan Showground is a heritage-listed showground at 19-41 Farrer Place, Queanbeyan, Queanbeyan-Palerang Region, New South Wales, Australia. The property is owned by Queanbeyan-Palerang Regional Council. It was added to the New South Wales State Heritage Register on 15 March 2013.

== History ==
In the 19th century names associated with Aboriginal groups in the district around Weereewaa (Lake George) were the Kamberri, Kgamberry, Nganbra and the Nganbra-Pialligo. In the 1820s the first Europeans travelled beyond Weereewaa (Lake George) in search of the Murrumbidgee River and "discovered" the Molonglo Plains. Severe drought during the 1820s impelled colonists to search for more pasture land and in 1828 Major H. C. Antill from Picton sent his cattle and sheep to Molonglo Plains.

The town of Queanbeyan grew up on the lands owned by innkeeper Timothy Beard, who had a collection of huts on the banks of Molonglo River. The town centre later shifted to the Queanbeyan River about one mile east and was officially proclaimed as a township in 1838 with a population of 50. From 1861 onwards new waves of British and European migrants arrived in the district to take advantage of the Robertson Land Acts and take up small allotments. Queanbeyan Aboriginal groups continued to host regular gatherings and corroborees and began to align these events with the annual government distribution of blankets.

Archaeological evidence and historical records show that the Queanbeyan Showground site was a traditional gathering place and burial place for Aboriginal people. Aborigines are first recorded camping on the site some time in the period 1846-50. The memoirs of W. Davis Wright describe a group of Aboriginals camping on lands in Farrer Place across the street from the showground. Records show blanket distribution took place in 1841, 1844, and 1861. The 1861 gathering took place in early April and is specifically associated with the annual distribution of blankets to the Aborigines in preparation for winter. A larger gathering is recorded in Queanbeyan in 1859 and another annual visit in 1861. The showground is specifically mentioned as the site of an 1862 gathering of tribes from Braidwood, Yass and Bland Plains. The gatherings of 1859 and 1862 which took place in June and April respectively were probably also connected with blanket distribution. Up until 1861 the blankets were distributed from the police station and court house located across Queanbeyan River; this seems to indicate the gatherings and camping took place at the showground site because it was a traditional location rather than for access to blankets.

The available evidence suggests that the gatherings served a much more significant purpose than the acquisition of blankets. The visits of large numbers of Aborigines from distant areas and the holding of corroborees are recorded in connection with the 1859, 1861 and 1862 gatherings. Local tradition maintains that corroborees were held on the current showground reserve around this time. Indeed, the reserve was the site of the last Aboriginal corroboree held in the Queanbeyan district in 1862. Held over many weeks, the corroboree was attended by many hundreds of Aborigines. Tribes gathered from as far as the coast and the regions of the lower Lachlan and Murrumbidgee Rivers (Australian Heritage Database). Visiting groups included the Moolingoolah from Captains Flat and the upper Molonglo, Queanbeyan and Shoalhaven River districts, the Tinderry Mountains and Bungendore; Ngambri and Ngurma groups from Tumut, Brungle, Tuggeranong, Wanniassa, Pialligo, Yarralumla, Ginninderra, the Murrumbidgee regions and other parts of their extensive country; and even groups from Parramatta and Liverpool

The tribes congregated at or around the same time each year for celebratory and ceremonial purposes, with the current showground reserve serving as one of the important sites for these events. Among local Aboriginal people there is an oral tradition that the showground was formerly a camping ground for their ancestors.

Part of the showground and some land to the south of it was also reputedly an Aboriginal burial ground. In his memoirs W. Davis Wright described the death of an Aboriginal man in a fight at a gathering on the current reserve in the period 1846-50 and that this person was buried on or near the site. According to AHIMS Site Card 57-2-65 in 1866, a local Queanbeyan resident discovered an Aboriginal skull, bones, a spear, a carved parrying shield and other Aboriginal implements on the showground: artefacts of a kind that were customarily buried with their deceased Aboriginal owners. The shield is said to have been given to the Historical Society. The site card also refers to an incident in 1935 where workmen digging a trench discovered the remains of an Aboriginal person buried in a sitting position on the northern side of West Avenue, approximately 80m south of the showground. In the Queanbeyan Showground Heritage Study historian Brendan O'Keefe refers to the 1935 find in West Avenue as well as the discovery of a burial during construction of the grandstand in 1939; the burial in the latter case was left in-situ and covered over.

Most of the present showground reserve was included in a large area that was designated by 1862 as a Recreation Ground for the people of Queanbeyan. The ground was located on the south-western edge of the original square mile grid of streets laid out by Government of New South Wales Surveyor, James Larmer, in 1838. In 1883 the Queanbeyan Pastoral, Agricultural and Horticultural Association succeeded in having part of the Recreation Ground resumed and a 3.7 ha portion of it dedicated as a showground. Agricultural shows were held on the ground from this date. By 1906 the showground was expanded by approximately 4 hectares. This area had also been part of the original Recreation Ground. A segment of the showground reserve on its north-eastern side (part of Lot 6, Section 56) was sold to the Catholic Church in 1920 so that it could erect a church and school on the site. With the money realised by this sale a 1.5 ha strip of land along the southern boundary was added to the showground reserve. In 1939 the Council became the trustee of both the body of the showground and of the extension along Glebe Avenue.

From its inception in 1893, the annual Queanbeyan Show developed into one of the most important community events in the Queanbeyan social calendar. Over the years the showground also became the venue for a variety of other activities. Trotting having become one of the main attractions of the annual shows, it was decided to construct a proper harness racing track on the ground in 1927. Until 1968 the showground track was one of New South Wales's most important venues for regular trotting meetings up. The showground also hosted carnivals, circuses and poultry exhibitions. Greyhound racing commenced in the early 1930s on a properly constructed coursing track. The racing continued until the 1990s. At the outbreak of World War II, the showground was used as the drill ground by the Canberra troop of light horse. On many occasions, the showground has served as an emergency caravan park when the Queanbeyan River has been in flood.

At the Lowe Street entrance to the reserve there is a set of memorial gates erected in March 1934 to the memory of Thomas Collett, a Queanbeyan businessman, council alderman and founding member of the Queanbeyan Pastoral and Agricultural Association.

The grandstand was built c. 1939.

The annual show continued to be popular after World War Two and continued to be a successful event until at least the early 1970s. After this time the show's fortunes began to decline and pressure to develop the showground increased. The site was seen by a majority of Queanbeyan City Council, the New South Wales Department of Lands and some local businesspeople as a valuable and underutilised piece of real estate close to the commercial heart of the city. In 1988, the council issued development plans for the showground. The development proposals roused considerable opposition in the city from various individuals and groups, including the Show Society, the Ngunnawal Land Council, the Monaro Conservation Society, the Queanbeyan and District Historical Society, the Coursing Club, the Trotting Association and a group specially formed to campaign for the retention of the showground, the Friends of Queanbeyan Showground. The council and Department of Lands pressed ahead and in mid-1989 twenty-four lots on Glebe Avenue were resumed. Following action by members of the Queanbeyan community, the New South Wales Legislative Council disallowed the resumption. The protracted dispute over the proposed development of the showground generated a great deal of publicity and a revival of interest in the ground. In the last few years, the annual show has undergone a strong resurgence.

== Description ==
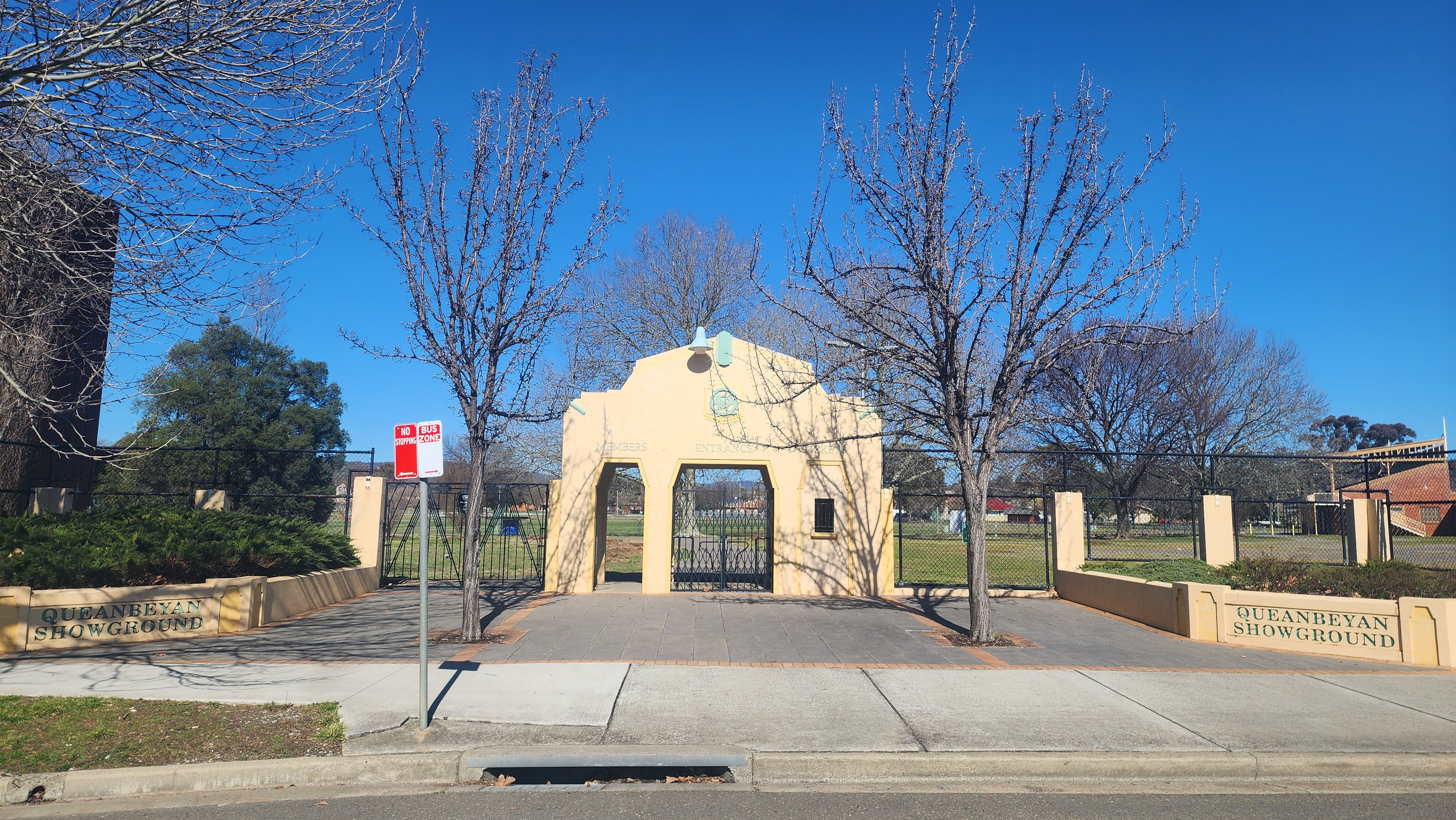
Gateway on Monaro Street (2025)

The following is an extract from the National Heritage Database: "The Queanbeyan Showground Reserve comprises a roughly triangular area of approximately 8.78ha (about 22 acres) in central Queanbeyan. The body of the reserve is composed of Lot 6 DP 1116082 and Lot 4, section 56, DP 758862 while a strip of land along Glebe Avenue consisting of Lots 1 to 24, DP 13963, contributes another 1.5ha to the ground. The whole of the area is Crown Land dedicated for showground purposes. The principal feature of the reserve is the showground arena, which has a trotting track on its perimeter and is overlooked by a grandstand. The grandstand is a brick building with a corrugated iron awning roof. A walkway runs across the front of the grandstand at the foot of the seating area and above the ground floor hall; the walkway, which has a balustrade, is accessed by stairways (not original) at each end of the building. The hall extends to the rear in a lean to form." Also located on the grounds are other ancillary structures relating to the various uses of the showground. At the Farrer Place entrance to the site is a gateway constructed in 1934 as a memorial to J.T Collett, a Queanbeyan businessman, Council alderman and founder of the Agricultural Association. The gateway is a rendered masonry art-deco style parapet with two single pedestrian arches flanking a wider vehicular entrance archway. There is another matching gateway on Lowe Street.

There are several mature trees on the ground, mainly at its western (Cameron Road) end. Archaeological finds and a burial have been recorded on the site.

The structures and buildings on the site relate to the use of the reserve as a showground and as a place with various uses associated with recreation. The grandstand and other historic elements such as the original gates have local heritage value. There are no structures or buildings on the site which relate to the State significant Aboriginal history of the site.

The site is intact as a showground. The cultural and historical significance are embodied in the place.
