= Brent Crisp =

Australian rugby league footballer

Personal information
- Full name: Brent Crisp
- Born: 10 September 1986 (age 40) Canberra, Australian Capital Territory, Australia
- Height: 189 cm (6 ft 2 in)
- Weight: 100 kg (15 st 10 lb)

Playing information
- Position: Fullback
Club
Years	Team	Pld	T	G	FG	P
2008	Canterbury-Bankstown	7	2	3	0	14
- Source: As of 17 January 2019

Brent Crisp (born 10 September 1986) is a former professional rugby league footballer who last played for the Central Queensland Capras in the Intrust Super Cup. Crisp formerly played for the Canterbury-Bankstown Bulldogs. Crisp primarily played at fullback and could also play on the wing.

== Background ==
Crisp was born in Canberra, ACT, Australia.

== Playing career ==
Crisp made his first-grade debut against the Manly-Warringah Sea Eagles at Brookvale Oval in round 7 of 2008. Crisp played a total of seven matches for Canterbury in the 2008 NRL season as the club finished with the Wooden Spoon.

Crisp is a former Aussie rules junior who played in the Goldfields Football League with the Railways club. On his return to the A.C.T., Crisp attended Canberra's Dickson College and gained a position in the Raider's Jersey Flegg team whilst playing at West Belconnen Warriors. In 2012, Crisp was banned from representative football for two years after an incident at a Queensland pub however his club at the time Young Cherrypickers did not terminate his contract. In 2013, Crisp played for Gladstone in Queensland before signing with Queensland Cup side the Central Queensland Capras for the 2014 season. In 2021, Crisp made the move to the Northern Territory A-Grade competition with the Nightcliff Dragons.
