= West Belconnen Warriors =

Australian rugby league football club

Club information
- Full name: West Belconnen Warriors Rugby League Football Club
- Colours: Dark blue Sky blue Yellow
- Founded: 1975
- Website: Official website

Current details
- Ground: Raiders Belconnen
- Coach: Adam Peters
- Competition: Canberra Raiders Cup
- 2018 Season: 4th (Lost Preliminary Final)

Records
- Premierships: 11 (1986, 1989, 1990, 1991, 1993, 1995, 1997, 1998, 2004, 2007, 2016, 2022)
- Runners-up: 11 (1976, 1977, 1985, 1988, 1992, 1994, 1996, 2002, 2003, 2005, 2009)
- Reserve Grade Premierships: 10 (1995, 1999, 2005, 2006, 2007, 2008, 2009, 2010, 2017, 2018)
- Under 18/19s Premierships: 3 (1987, 1989, 2001)
- Ladies League Tag Premierships: 2 (2017, 2018)

West Belconnen Warriors Rugby League Club is an Australian rugby league football club based in Belconnen, Australian Capital Territory formed in the mid 1970s. They conduct teams for both junior and senior teams.

== Notable Juniors ==
- Bradley Clyde (1988-00 Canberra Raiders & Canterbury Bulldogs)
- Troy Thompson (2001-11 Canberra Raiders & Melbourne Storm)
- Nick Kouparitsas (2006-11 Canterbury Bulldogs, Sydney Roosters & London Broncos)
- Brent Crisp (2008 Canterbury Bulldogs)
- Matt Frawley (2017- Canterbury Bulldogs)
- Bailey Simonsson (2019- Canberra Raiders & Canberra Raiders)
