= Seiffert Oval =

Sports ground of Queanbeyan, Australia

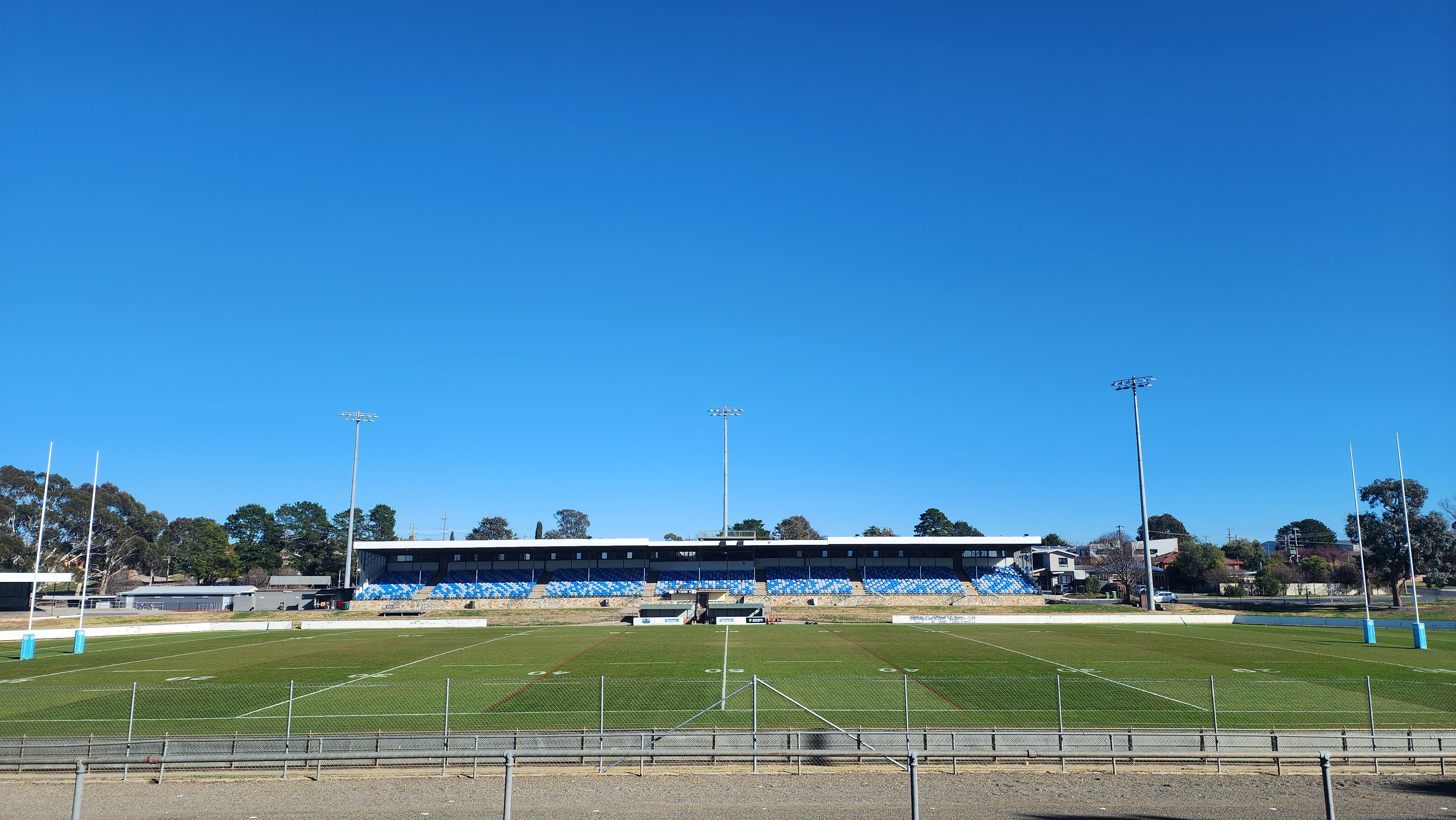
- Interactive map of Seiffert Oval
- Location: Queanbeyan, New South Wales
- Coordinates: 35°20′43″S 149°14′34″E
- Capacity: 15,000
- Surface: Grass

Tenants
- Canberra Raiders (1982–1989) / Trials (2015-2017, 2021, 2024, 2026); Inter Monaro SC (NSL) (1985–1986); Queanbeyan Blues; Canberra United FC (2018)

Seiffert Oval is an enclosed rectangular playing field in Queanbeyan, New South Wales, Australia. It has a grass playing surface and an official capacity of 15,000, 1,500 of which is seated capacity in the grandstand. The oval has been used for rugby league, soccer, and rugby union, and is currently the home ground for the Queanbeyan Blues.

The oval is owned and managed by the Queanbeyan–Palerang Regional Council.

The ground record crowd was set on 18 June 1989 when 18,272 fans turned out in Round 12 of the 1989 NSWRL season to see the Canberra Raiders defeat the Brisbane Broncos 27–6.

== Rugby League ==
Seiffert Oval served as the base of the Canberra Raiders for the first eight seasons of its existence (1982–1989). The Raiders' first game at Seiffert was in Round 2 of the 1982 NSWRFL season against the Western Suburbs Magpies. In front of 6,769 fans, Wests ran out 33–4 winners, with the home side failing to score a try against their opponents' seven. Canberra's first win at the ground, which was also their first ever competition win, would come in Round 8 of the 1982 season when 9,982 fans saw the "Green Machine" run out 12–11 winners over the Newtown Jets.

The ground hosted an 'international' rugby league match during the 1988 Great Britain Lions tour when an Australian Prime Minister's XIII, including Raiders Glenn Lazarus and Mal Meninga, defeated the tourists 24–16 on a wet day in front of 6,037 fans. It also hosted an international rugby union match when the British and Irish Lions defeated the ACTRU 41–25 in 1989.

The Canberra Raiders final premiership game at Seiffert Oval was on 20 August 1989. On the day the Raiders (who won their first premiership that year becoming the first non-Sydney premiers) defeated the Illawarra Steelers 16–6 in front of 6,161 fans. The Steelers had also joined the competition in 1982. After winning the 1989 premiership, the Raiders moved to the larger Bruce Stadium in the Canberra suburb of Bruce where they have remained since the beginning of the 1990 season.

The Canberra Raiders made a return to Seiffert Oval for pre-season trial games against the Newcastle Knights on 21 February 2015 and 18 February 2017. The Raiders also returned to Seiffert Oval on 27 February 2021 for a trial match against Sydney Roosters.
