= 2022 Canberra Rugby League =

2022 Canberra Raiders Cup
- Duration: 2 April – 18 September 2022
- Teams: 9
- Broadcast partners: Bar TV Sports

The 2022 Canberra Raiders Cup will be the 24th season of the cup, the top division Rugby League club competition in Canberra. The 2022 Canberra Raiders Cup will consist of 18 regular season rounds that will begin on 2 April and end on 27 August. There will be 3 playoff rounds, beginning on 3 September with the first semi-final, and ending on 18 September with the Grand Final.

== Canberra Raiders Cup (First Grade) ==
=== Teams ===
There will be 9 teams playing in 2022. 5 teams from Canberra, 2 from Queanbeyan, 1 from Yass, and 1 from Goulburn.

Colours	Club	Season	Home ground(s)	Head coach
	Belconnen United Sharks	6th season	NSWRL HQ Bruce	Scott Logan
	Goulburn City Bulldogs	2nd season	Workers Arena	Tyson Greenwood
	Gungahlin Bulls	29th season	Gungahlin Enclosed Oval	Neil Bijorac
	Queanbeyan Kangaroos	53rd season	Seears Workwear Oval	Adam Taylor
	Queanbeyan United Blues	83rd season	Seiffert Oval	Terry Campese
	Tuggeranong Bushrangers	19th season	Greenway Oval	Jason Kelly
	West Belconnen Warriors	47th season	Raiders Belconnen	Tim Sloman
	Woden Valley Rams	52nd season	Phillip Oval	William Thomson
	Yass Magpies	69th season	Walker Park	Cameron Hardy

=== Ladder ===
Pos	Team	Pld	W	D	L	B	PF	PA	PD	Pts
1	West Belconnen Warriors	16	11	1	4	2	409	320	+89	27
2	Woden Valley Rams	16	11	0	5	2	388	342	+46	26
3	Tuggeranong Bushrangers	16	10	1	5	2	468	299	+169	25
4	Queanbeyan United Blues	16	11	0	5	2	550	364	+186	23
5	Belconnen United Sharks	16	8	0	8	2	420	469	−49	20
6	Queanbeyan Kangaroos	16	8	0	8	2	376	432	−56	20
7	Goulburn City Bulldogs	16	6	0	10	2	370	453	−83	16
8	Gungahlin Bulls	16	4	0	12	2	372	444	−72	12
9	Yass Magpies	16	2	0	14	2	266	496	−230	8

Updated to match(es) played on 27 August. Source:
Rules for classification: 1) points; 2) point difference; 3) points scored

==== Ladder progression ====
- Numbers highlighted in green indicate that the team finished the round inside the top 4.
- Numbers highlighted in blue indicates the team finished first on the ladder in that round.
- Numbers highlighted in red indicates the team finished last place on the ladder in that round.
- Underlined numbers indicate that the team had a bye during that round.

Pos	Team	1	2	3	4	5	6	7	8	9	10	11	12	13	14	15	16	17	18
1	West Belconnen Warriors	2	4	6	8	10	11	13	15	15	17	19	21	23	23	23	25	25	27
2	Woden Valley Rams	2	4	4	6	6	8	10	12	14	14	16	18	18	20	22	24	24	26
3	Tuggeranong Bushrangers	2	2	4	6	8	9	11	13	15	15	15	15	17	19	21	23	25	25
4	Queanbeyan United Blues	0	2	2	4	6	8	10	12	14	16	18	20	22	22	22	24	23*	23
5	Belconnen United Sharks	0	2	2	2	4	4	4	6	8	10	10	12	12	14	16	16	18	20
6	Queanbeyan Kangaroos	0	0	2	2	2	4	6	6	6	8	10	10	12	14	14	16	18	20
7	Goulburn City Bulldogs	2	4	6	6	8	8	8	8	10	10	12	12	14	16	16	16	16	16
8	Gungahlin Bulls	0	0	2	2	2	4	4	4	4	4	4	6	6	6	8	8	10	12
9	Yass Magpies	2	2	2	4	4	4	4	4	4	6	6	6	6	6	8	8	8	8

- = Ahead of their round 17 match, Queanbeyan United was stripped of three competition points for salary cap breaches.

=== Season results ===
==== Round 1 ====
Home	Score	Away	Match Information
Home	Score	Away	Date and Time	Venue	Referee
Woden Valley Rams	16 – 6	Queanbeyan United Blues	Saturday, 2 April, 3:00pm	Phillip Oval	Andrew Nightingale
Tuggeranong Bushrangers	40 – 6	Queanbeyan Kangaroos	Saturday, 2 April, 3:00pm	Greenway Oval	David Charman
Gungahlin Bulls	30 – 33	West Belconnen Warriors	Saturday, 2 April, 3:00pm	Gungahlin Enclosed Oval	Andrew Wheeler
Belconnen United Sharks	14 – 38	Goulburn City Bulldogs	Saturday, 2 April, 3:00pm	NSWRL HQ Bruce	James Charman
Yass Magpies		BYE

==== Round 2 ====
Home	Score	Away	Match Information
Home	Score	Away	Date and Time	Venue	Referee
Yass Magpies	22 – 40	Woden Valley Rams	Saturday, 9 April, 3:00pm	Walker Park	Luke Barrow
Queanbeyan United Blues	32 – 20	Tuggeranong Bushrangers	Saturday, 9 April, 3:00pm	Seiffert Oval	David Charman
Goulburn City Bulldogs	48 – 16	Gungahlin Bulls	Saturday, 9 April, 3:00pm	Workers Arena	Andrew Wheeler
Belconnen United Sharks	26 – 10	Queanbeyan Kangaroos	Saturday, 9 April, 3:00pm	NSWRL HQ Bruce	Braiden McIntosh
West Belconnen Warriors		BYE

==== Round 3 ====
Home	Score	Away	Match Information
Home	Score	Away	Date and Time	Venue	Referee
Woden Valley Rams	6 – 36	Tuggeranong Bushrangers	Saturday, 23 April, 3:00pm	Phillip Oval	Andrew Wheeler
Gungahlin Bulls	44 – 16	Queanbeyan United Blues	Saturday, 23 April, 3:00pm	Gungahlin Enclosed Oval	Braiden McIntosh
Goulburn City Bulldogs	36 – 6	Yass Magpies	Sunday, 24 April, 3:00pm	Workers Arena	Jason McManus
West Belconnen Warriors	52 – 6	Belconnen United Sharks	Sunday, 24 April, 5:00pm	Raiders Belconnen	Andrew Nightingale
Queanbeyan Kangaroos		BYE

==== Round 4 ====
Home	Score	Away	Match Information
Home	Score	Away	Date and Time	Venue	Referee
Yass Magpies	34 – 16	Gungahlin Bulls	Saturday, 30 April, 3:00pm	Walker Park	David Charman
West Belconnen Warriors	37 – 30	Goulburn City Bulldogs	Saturday, 30 April, 3:00pm	Raiders Belconnen	Braiden McIntosh
Tuggeranong Bushrangers	52 – 16	Belconnen United Sharks	Saturday, 30 April, 3:00pm	Greenway Oval	James Charman
Queanbeyan Kangaroos	28 – 34	Woden Valley Rams	Saturday, 30 April, 3:00pm	Seears Workwear Oval	Jason McManus
Queanbeyan United Blues		BYE

==== Round 5 ====
Home	Score	Away	Match Information
Home	Score	Away	Date and Time	Venue	Referee
Yass Magpies	10 – 30	Tuggeranong Bushrangers	Saturday, 7 May, 3:00pm	Walker Park	Luke Barrow
Woden Valley Rams	20 – 36	West Belconnen Warriors	Saturday, 7 May, 3:00pm	Phillip Oval	Andrew Nightingale
Queanbeyan United Blues	64 – 10	Queanbeyan Kangaroos	Saturday, 7 May, 3:00pm	Seiffert Oval	Braiden McIntosh
Belconnen United Sharks	30 – 28	Gungahlin Bulls	Saturday, 7 May, 3:00pm	NSWRL HQ Bruce	Jason McManus
Goulburn City Bulldogs		BYE

==== Round 6 ====
Home	Score	Away	Match Information
Home	Score	Away	Date and Time	Venue	Referee
Tuggeranong Bushrangers	26 – 26	West Belconnen Warriors	Saturday, 21 May, 3:00pm	Greenway Oval	Braiden McIntosh
Queanbeyan Kangaroos	20 – 12	Yass Magpies	Saturday, 21 May, 3:00pm	Seears Workwear Oval	James Charman
Belconnen United Sharks	16 – 42	Queanbeyan United Blues	Saturday, 21 May, 3:00pm	NSWRL HQ Bruce	David Charman
Goulburn City Bulldogs	16 – 34	Woden Valley Rams	Saturday, 21 May, 3:00pm	Workers Arena	Andrew Nightingale
Gungahlin Bulls		BYE

==== Round 7 ====
Home	Score	Away	Match Information
Home	Score	Away	Date and Time	Venue	Referee
Yass Magpies	18 – 26	West Belconnen Warriors	Saturday, 28 May, 3:00pm	Walker Park	David Charman
Woden Valley Rams	28 – 18	Belconnen United Sharks	Saturday, 28 May, 3:00pm	Phillip Oval	Luke Barrow
Queanbeyan United Blues	41 – 28	Goulburn City Bulldogs	Saturday, 28 May, 3:00pm	Seiffert Oval	Braiden McIntosh
Gungahlin Bulls	22 – 24	Queanbeyan Kangaroos	Saturday, 28 May, 3:00pm	Gungahlin Enclosed Oval	James Charman
Tuggeranong Bushrangers		BYE

==== Round 8 ====
Home	Score	Away	Match Information
Home	Score	Away	Date and Time	Venue	Referee
West Belconnen Warriors	16 – 10	Queanbeyan Kangaroos	Saturday, 4 June, 3:00pm	Raiders Belconnen	Luke Barrow
Queanbeyan United Blues	62 – 18	Yass Magpies	Saturday, 4 June, 3:00pm	Seiffert Oval	Andrew Nightingale
Woden Valley Rams	22 – 14	Gungahlin Bulls	Sunday, 5 June, 3:00pm	Phillip Oval	Braiden McIntosh
Goulburn City Bulldogs	12 – 24	Tuggeranong Bushrangers	Sunday, 5 June, 3:00pm	Workers Arena	James Charman
Belconnen United Sharks		BYE

==== Round 9 ====
Home	Score	Away	Match Information
Home	Score	Away	Date and Time	Venue	Referee
Yass Magpies	8 – 32	Belconnen United Sharks	Saturday, 18 June, 3:00pm	Walker Park	Jason McManus
Tuggeranong Bushrangers	18 – 16	Gungahlin Bulls	Saturday, 18 June, 3:00pm	Greenway Oval	James Charman
Queanbeyan Kangaroos	18 – 38	Goulburn City Bulldogs	Saturday, 18 June, 3:00pm	Seears Workwear Oval	Andrew Nightingale
West Belconnen Warriors	18 – 46	Queanbeyan United Blues	Sunday, 19 June, 3:00pm	Raiders Belconnen	Braiden McIntosh
Woden Valley Rams		BYE

==== Round 10 ====
Home	Score	Away	Match Information
Home	Score	Away	Date and Time	Venue	Referee
West Belconnen Warriors	23 – 12	Gungahlin Bulls	Saturday, 25 June, 3:00pm	Raiders Belconnen	Luke Barrow
Queanbeyan United Blues	26 – 16	Woden Valley Rams	Saturday, 25 June, 3:00pm	Seiffert Oval	Andrew Nightingale
Queanbeyan Kangaroos	27 – 18	Tuggeranong Bushrangers	Saturday, 25 June, 3:00pm	Seears Workwear Oval	Braiden McIntosh
Goulburn City Bulldogs	10 – 54	Belconnen United Sharks	Sunday, 26 June, 3:00pm	Workers Arena	Jason McManus
Yass Magpies		BYE

==== Round 11 ====
Home	Score	Away	Match Information
Home	Score	Away	Date and Time	Venue	Referee
Woden Valley Rams	32 – 8	Yass Magpies	Saturday, 2 July, 3:00pm	Phillip Oval	James Charman
Tuggeranong Bushrangers	10 – 36	Queanbeyan United Blues	Saturday, 2 July, 3:00pm	Greenway Oval	Andrew Nightingale
Queanbeyan Kangaroos	31 – 24	Belconnen United Sharks	Saturday, 2 July, 3:00pm	Seears Workwear Oval	Luke Barrow
Gungahlin Bulls	8 – 12	Goulburn City Bulldogs	Saturday, 2 July, 3:00pm	Gungahlin Enclosed Oval	David Charman
West Belconnen Warriors		BYE

==== Round 12 ====
Home	Score	Away	Match Information
Home	Score	Away	Date and Time	Venue	Referee
Woden Valley Rams	34 – 30	Queanbeyan Kangaroos	Saturday, 9 July, 3:00pm	Phillip Oval	Braiden McIntosh
Gungahlin Bulls	18 – 16	Yass Magpies	Saturday, 9 July, 3:00pm	Gungahlin Enclosed Oval	David Charman
Belconnen United Sharks	22 – 16	Tuggeranong Bushrangers	Saturday, 9 July, 3:00pm	NSWRL HQ Bruce	Luke Barrow
Goulburn City Bulldogs	10 – 16	West Belconnen Warriors	Sunday, 10 July, 3:00pm	Workers Arena	Andrew Nightingale
Queanbeyan United Blues		BYE

==== Round 13 ====
Home	Score	Away	Match Information
Home	Score	Away	Date and Time	Venue	Referee
Yass Magpies	22 – 36	Goulburn City Bulldogs	Saturday, 16 July, 3:00pm	Walker Park	David Charman
Tuggeranong Bushrangers	30 – 16	Woden Valley Rams	Saturday, 16 July, 3:00pm	Greenway Oval	Braiden McIntosh
Queanbeyan United Blues	50 – 24	Gungahlin Bulls	Saturday, 16 July, 3:00pm	Seiffert Oval	Gage Miles
Belconnen United Sharks	18 – 22	West Belconnen Warriors	Saturday, 16 July, 3:00pm	NSWRL HQ Bruce	Jason McManus
Queanbeyan Kangaroos		BYE

==== Round 14 ====
Home	Score	Away	Match Information
Home	Score	Away	Date and Time	Venue	Referee
Tuggeranong Bushrangers	28 – 10	Yass Magpies	Saturday, 23 July, 3:00pm	Greenway Oval	Gage Miles
Queanbeyan Kangaroos	38 – 22	Queanbeyan United Blues	Saturday, 23 July, 3:00pm	Seears Workwear Oval	Luke Barrow
Gungahlin Bulls	28 – 44	Belconnen United Sharks	Saturday, 23 July, 3:00pm	Gungahlin Enclosed Oval	James Charman
West Belconnen Warriors	12 – 22	Woden Valley Rams	Sunday, 24 July, 3:00pm	Raiders Belconnen	Andrew Nightingale
Goulburn City Bulldogs		BYE

==== Round 15 ====
Home	Score	Away	Match Information
Home	Score	Away	Date and Time	Venue	Referee
Yass Magpies	22 – 18	Queanbeyan Kangaroos	Saturday, 30 July, 3:00pm	Walker Park	David Charman
Woden Valley Rams	20 – 10	Goulburn City Bulldogs	Saturday, 30 July, 3:00pm	Phillip Oval	Luke Barrow
Queanbeyan United Blues	36 – 44	Belconnen United Sharks	Saturday, 30 July, 3:00pm	Seiffert Oval	Gage Miles
West Belconnen Warriors	12 – 26	Tuggeranong Bushrangers	Sunday, 31 July, 3:00pm	Raiders Belconnen	Braiden McIntosh
Gungahlin Bulls		BYE

==== Round 16 ====
Home	Score	Away	Match Information
Home	Score	Away	Date and Time	Venue	Referee
West Belconnen Warriors	34 – 14	Yass Magpies	Saturday, 13 August, 3:00pm	Raiders Belconnen	James Charman
Queanbeyan Kangaroos	30 – 26	Gungahlin Bulls	Saturday, 13 August, 3:00pm	Seears Workwear Oval	Gage Miles
Belconnen United Sharks	22 – 36	Woden Valley Rams	Saturday, 13 August, 3:00pm	NSWRL HQ Bruce	Braiden McIntosh
Goulburn City Bulldogs	22 – 27	Queanbeyan United Blues	Saturday, 13 August, 3:00pm	Workers Arena	Jason McManus
Tuggeranong Bushrangers		BYE

==== Round 17 ====
Home	Score	Away	Match Information
Home	Score	Away	Date and Time	Venue	Referee
Yass Magpies	14 – 34	Queanbeyan United Blues	Saturday, 20 August, 3:00pm	Walker Park	Luke Barrow
Tuggeranong Bushrangers	62 – 10	Goulburn City Bulldogs	Saturday, 20 August, 3:00pm	Greenway Oval	Braiden McIntosh
Queanbeyan Kangaroos	22 – 20	West Belconnen Warriors	Saturday, 20 August, 3:00pm	Seears Workwear Oval	James Charman
Gungahlin Bulls	28 – 12	Woden Valley Rams	Sunday, 21 August, 3:00pm	Gungahlin Enclosed Oval	Andrew Nightingale
Belconnen United Sharks		BYE

==== Round 18 ====
Home	Score	Away	Match Information
Home	Score	Away	Date and Time	Venue	Referee
Queanbeyan United Blues	10 – 26	West Belconnen Warriors	Saturday, 27 August, 3:00pm	Seiffert Oval	Braiden McIntosh
Gungahlin Bulls	42 – 32	Tuggeranong Bushrangers	Saturday, 27 August, 3:00pm	Gungahlin Enclosed Oval	James Charman
Goulburn City Bulldogs	14 – 54	Queanbeyan Kangaroos	Saturday, 27 August, 3:00pm	Workers Arena	Luke Barrow
Belconnen United Sharks	34 – 32	Yass Magpies	Saturday, 27 August, 3:00pm	NSWRL HQ Bruce	Gage Miles
Woden Valley Rams		BYE

=== Finals Series ===
Minor & Major Semi-Finals
1	West Belconnen	46
2	Woden Valley	10
3	Tuggeranong	14
4	Queanbeyan United	32

Preliminary Final
2	Woden Valley	22
4	Queanbeyan United	36

Grand Final
1	West Belconnen
4	Queanbeyan United

Home	Score	Away	Match Information
Home	Score	Away	Date and Time	Venue	Referee
Minor & Major Semi-Finals
Tuggeranong Bushrangers	14 – 32	Queanbeyan United Blues	Saturday, 3 September, 3:00pm	Greenway Oval	Braiden McIntosh
West Belconnen Warriors	46 – 10	Woden Valley Rams	Sunday, 4 September, 3:00pm	Raiders Belconnen	Andrew Nightingale
Preliminary Final
Woden Valley Rams	22 – 36	Queanbeyan United Blues	Sunday, 11 September, 3:00pm	Gungahlin Enclosed Oval	Andrew Nightingale
Grand Final
West Belconnen Warriors	V	Queanbeyan United Blues	Sunday, 18 September, 3:20pm	Seiffert Oval	Andrew Nightingale

=== Grand Final ===
Sunday, 18 September
3:20pm

West Belconnen Warriors	v	Queanbeyan United Blues

Seiffert Oval, Queanbeyan
Referee: Andrew Nightingale

Team lists:

FB	1	Ryan McQueen
WG	2	Kylan Edwards
CE	3	Ryley Thomas
CE	20	William Peace
WG	5	Brandon Withers
FE	6	Bayley Graham
HB	7	Robert Roberts
PR	8	Thomas Bethke
HK	9	Harry Brown
PR	10	Manu Vanisi
SR	11	Arthur Brown
SR	12	Timothy Middleton
LK	13	David White
Substitutes:
IC	14	Logan Reis
IC	21	Mitchell Shaw
IC	16	Harrison Whatman
IC	19	Kirren Roughley
Concussion Substitute:
RE	17	Luke Ashlin
Coach:
Tim Sloman

Officials:

Andrew Nightingale (Referee)

James Charman (Touch Judge)

Luke Barrow (Touch Judge)

FB	1	Mathew Parsons
WG	2	George Morseu
CE	3	Jake Butler-Fleming
CE	4	Tristan Eldridge
WG	16	Bryce Lee
FE	6	Terry Campese
HB	7	Charlie Woolford
PR	8	Romann Leota
HK	9	Joshua Mitchell
PR	10	Atunaisa Tupou
SR	11	Joshua Baker
SR	12	Cyprian Ale
LK	13	Bradley Buckley
Substitutes:
IC	14	Adam Misios
IC	15	Brent Lamb
IC	17	Jayden Svager
IC	19	John Papalii
Concussion Substitute:
RE	18	Ropata Doherty
Coach:
Ronald Hoare

== Reserve Grade ==
=== Teams ===
Colours	Club	Home ground(s)	Head coach
	Belconnen United Sharks	NSWRL HQ Bruce	Joshua Butz
	Goulburn City Bulldogs	Workers Arena	John Sykes
	Gungahlin Bulls	Gungahlin Enclosed Oval	Benjamin Flynn
	Queanbeyan Kangaroos	Seears Workwear Oval	Troy Whiley
	Queanbeyan United Blues	Seiffert Oval	Scott Heritage
	Tuggeranong Bushrangers	Greenway Oval	Joel Glover
	West Belconnen Warriors	Raiders Belconnen	Matthew Corscadden
	Woden Valley Rams	Phillip Oval	Albert Camilleri
	Yass Magpies	Walker Park	Christopher Rawlinson

=== Ladder ===
Pos	Team	Pld	W	D	L	B	PF	PA	PD	Pts
1	Gungahlin Bulls RG	16	12	1	3	2	490	215	+275	29
2	Queanbeyan Kangaroos RG	16	10	0	6	2	359	268	+91	24
3	Yass Magpies RG	16	9	0	7	2	384	277	+97	22
4	West Belconnen Warriors RG	16	9	0	7	2	318	286	+32	22
5	Goulburn City Bulldogs RG	16	8	2	6	2	331	306	+25	22
6	Queanbeyan United Blues RG	16	8	2	6	2	440	262	+178	20
7	Woden Valley Rams RG	16	7	2	7	2	390	298	+92	20
8	Tuggeranong Bushrangers RG	16	5	1	10	2	290	442	−152	15
9	Belconnen United Sharks RG	16	0	0	16	2	132	770	−638	4

Updated to match(es) played on 27 August. Source:
Rules for classification: 1) points; 2) point difference; 3) points scored

==== Ladder progression ====
- Numbers highlighted in green indicate that the team finished the round inside the top 4.
- Numbers highlighted in blue indicates the team finished first on the ladder in that round.
- Numbers highlighted in red indicates the team finished last place on the ladder in that round.
- Underlined numbers indicate that the team had a bye during that round.

Pos	Team	1	2	3	4	5	6	7	8	9	10	11	12	13	14	15	16	17	18
1	Gungahlin Bulls RG	2	2	4	4	6	8	8	9	11	13	15	17	19	21	23	25	27	29
2	Queanbeyan Kangaroos RG	2	4	6	8	8	10	12	12	12	14	16	18	20	22	22	22	22	24
3	Yass Magpies RG	2	2	2	4	6	6	8	8	10	12	12	12	14	16	18	18	20	22
4	West Belconnen Warriors RG	0	2	4	4	4	6	6	8	10	10	12	12	14	16	18	20	22	22
5	Goulburn City Bulldogs RG	2	4	6	8	10	10	10	11	13	15	15	17	17	19	21	22	22	22
6	Queanbeyan United Blues RG	1	3	1*	3	5	7	9	11	11	13	13	15	15	15	17	18	18	20
7	Woden Valley Rams RG	1	3	5	5	7	9	11	12	14	14	16	16	16	16	16	18	18	20
8	Tuggeranong Bushrangers RG	0	0	0	2	2	2	4	5	5	5	7	9	11	11	11	13	15	15
9	Belconnen United Sharks RG	0	0	0	0	0	0	0	2	2	2	2	2	2	2	2	2	4	4

- = After their round 3 match, Queanbeyan United was stripped of two competition points for on-field conduct.

=== Season results ===
==== Round 1 ====
Home	Score	Away	Match Information
Home	Score	Away	Date and Time	Venue	Referee
Woden Valley Rams	14 – 14	Queanbeyan United Blues	Saturday, 2 April, 1:20pm	Phillip Oval	Jason Severs
Tuggeranong Bushrangers	16 – 18	Queanbeyan Kangaroos	Saturday, 2 April, 1:20pm	Greenway Oval	Katherine Nightingale
Gungahlin Bulls	48 – 0	West Belconnen Warriors	Saturday, 2 April, 1:20pm	Gungahlin Enclosed Oval	Luke Barrow
Belconnen United Sharks	4 – 40	Goulburn City Bulldogs	Saturday, 2 April, 1:20pm	NSWRL HQ Bruce	Daniel Wheeler
Yass Magpies		BYE

==== Round 2 ====
Home	Score	Away	Match Information
Home	Score	Away	Date and Time	Venue	Referee
Yass Magpies	14 – 18	Woden Valley Rams	Saturday, 9 April, 1:20pm	Walker Park	Nathan Gauci
Queanbeyan United Blues	28 – 10	Tuggeranong Bushrangers	Saturday, 9 April, 1:20pm	Seiffert Oval	Jason Severs
Goulburn City Bulldogs	30 – 22	Gungahlin Bulls	Saturday, 9 April, 1:20pm	Workers Arena	Jason McManus
Belconnen United Sharks	14 – 40	Queanbeyan Kangaroos	Saturday, 9 April, 1:20pm	NSWRL HQ Bruce	Jack Black
West Belconnen Warriors		BYE

==== Round 3 ====
Home	Score	Away	Match Information
Home	Score	Away	Date and Time	Venue	Referee
Woden Valley Rams	30 – 18	Tuggeranong Bushrangers	Saturday, 23 April, 1:20pm	Phillip Oval	Luke Barrow
Gungahlin Bulls	26 – 10	Queanbeyan United Blues	Saturday, 23 April, 1:20pm	Gungahlin Enclosed Oval	Tristan Brooker
Goulburn City Bulldogs	25 – 0	Yass Magpies	Sunday, 24 April, 1:20pm	Workers Arena	James Charman
West Belconnen Warriors	20 – 12	Belconnen United Sharks	Sunday, 24 April, 3:20pm	Raiders Belconnen	Jason Severs
Queanbeyan Kangaroos		BYE

==== Round 4 ====
Home	Score	Away	Match Information
Home	Score	Away	Date and Time	Venue	Referee
Yass Magpies	16 – 14	Gungahlin Bulls	Saturday, 30 April, 1:20pm	Walker Park	Tristan Brooker
West Belconnen Warriors	10 – 22	Goulburn City Bulldogs	Saturday, 30 April, 1:20pm	Raiders Belconnen	Nathan Gauci
Tuggeranong Bushrangers	46 – 16	Belconnen United Sharks	Saturday, 30 April, 1:20pm	Greenway Oval	Michael Bayley
Queanbeyan Kangaroos	28 – 10	Woden Valley Rams	Saturday, 30 April, 1:20pm	Seears Workwear Oval	Geordie Doherty
Queanbeyan United Blues		BYE

==== Round 5 ====
Home	Score	Away	Match Information
Home	Score	Away	Date and Time	Venue	Referee
Yass Magpies	36 – 4	Tuggeranong Bushrangers	Saturday, 7 May, 1:20pm	Walker Park	Liam Richardson
Woden Valley Rams	26 – 16	West Belconnen Warriors	Saturday, 7 May, 1:20pm	Phillip Oval	Gage Miles
Queanbeyan United Blues	14 – 8	Queanbeyan Kangaroos	Saturday, 7 May, 1:20pm	Seiffert Oval	Nathan Gauci
Belconnen United Sharks	4 – 40	Gungahlin Bulls	Saturday, 7 May, 1:20pm	NSWRL HQ Bruce	Tristan Brooker
Goulburn City Bulldogs		BYE

==== Round 6 ====
Home	Score	Away	Match Information
Home	Score	Away	Date and Time	Venue	Referee
Tuggeranong Bushrangers	8 – 34	West Belconnen Warriors	Saturday, 21 May, 1:20pm	Greenway Oval	Katherine Nightingale
Queanbeyan Kangaroos	32 – 26	Yass Magpies	Saturday, 21 May, 1:20pm	Seears Workwear Oval	Jason McManus
Belconnen United Sharks	0 – 74	Queanbeyan United Blues	Saturday, 21 May, 1:20pm	NSWRL HQ Bruce	Jack Black
Goulburn City Bulldogs	6 – 46	Woden Valley Rams	Saturday, 21 May, 1:20pm	Workers Arena	James Gould
Gungahlin Bulls		BYE

==== Round 7 ====
Home	Score	Away	Match Information
Home	Score	Away	Date and Time	Venue	Referee
Yass Magpies	22 – 6	West Belconnen Warriors	Saturday, 28 May, 1:20pm	Walker Park	Michael Bayley
Woden Valley Rams	76 – 6	Belconnen United Sharks	Saturday, 28 May, 1:20pm	Phillip Oval	Jack Black
Queanbeyan United Blues	44 – 18	Goulburn City Bulldogs	Saturday, 28 May, 1:20pm	Seiffert Oval	Tristan Brooker
Gungahlin Bulls	14 – 23	Queanbeyan Kangaroos	Saturday, 28 May, 1:20pm	Gungahlin Enclosed Oval	Liam Richardson
Tuggeranong Bushrangers		BYE

==== Round 8 ====
Home	Score	Away	Match Information
Home	Score	Away	Date and Time	Venue	Referee
West Belconnen Warriors	22 – 14	Queanbeyan Kangaroos	Saturday, 4 June, 1:20pm	Raiders Belconnen	Jason McManus
Queanbeyan United Blues	22 – 6	Yass Magpies	Saturday, 4 June, 1:20pm	Seiffert Oval	Tristan Brooker
Woden Valley Rams	18 – 18	Gungahlin Bulls	Sunday, 5 June, 1:20pm	Phillip Oval	Liam Richardson
Goulburn City Bulldogs	20 – 20	Tuggeranong Bushrangers	Sunday, 5 June, 1:20pm	Workers Arena	David Charman
Belconnen United Sharks		BYE

==== Round 9 ====
Home	Score	Away	Match Information
Home	Score	Away	Date and Time	Venue	Referee
Yass Magpies	38 – 8	Belconnen United Sharks	Saturday, 18 June, 1:20pm	Walker Park	Luke Barrow
Tuggeranong Bushrangers	6 – 34	Gungahlin Bulls	Saturday, 18 June, 1:20pm	Greenway Oval	Michael Bayley
Queanbeyan Kangaroos	8 – 18	Goulburn City Bulldogs	Saturday, 18 June, 1:20pm	Seears Workwear Oval	Jack Black
West Belconnen Warriors	32 – 12	Queanbeyan United Blues	Sunday, 19 June, 1:20pm	Raiders Belconnen	Jason Severs
Woden Valley Rams		BYE

==== Round 10 ====
Home	Score	Away	Match Information
Home	Score	Away	Date and Time	Venue	Referee
West Belconnen Warriors	6 – 18	Gungahlin Bulls	Saturday, 25 June, 1:20pm	Raiders Belconnen	Tristan Brooker
Queanbeyan United Blues	16 – 10	Woden Valley Rams	Saturday, 25 June, 1:20pm	Seiffert Oval	Jack Black
Queanbeyan Kangaroos	54 – 6	Tuggeranong Bushrangers	Saturday, 25 June, 1:20pm	Seears Workwear Oval	James Charman
Goulburn City Bulldogs	42 – 10	Belconnen United Sharks	Sunday, 26 June, 1:20pm	Workers Arena	Liam Richardson
Yass Magpies		BYE

==== Round 11 ====
Home	Score	Away	Match Information
Home	Score	Away	Date and Time	Venue	Referee
Woden Valley Rams	22 – 18	Yass Magpies	Saturday, 2 July, 1:20pm	Phillip Oval	Andrew Wheeler
Tuggeranong Bushrangers	20 – 18	Queanbeyan United Blues	Saturday, 2 July, 1:20pm	Greenway Oval	Tristan Brooker
Queanbeyan Kangaroos	36 – 4	Belconnen United Sharks	Saturday, 2 July, 1:20pm	Seears Workwear Oval	Jason McManus
Gungahlin Bulls	16 – 14	Goulburn City Bulldogs	Saturday, 2 July, 1:20pm	Gungahlin Enclosed Oval	Jack Black
West Belconnen Warriors		BYE

==== Round 12 ====
Home	Score	Away	Match Information
Home	Score	Away	Date and Time	Venue	Referee
Woden Valley Rams	16 – 20	Queanbeyan Kangaroos	Saturday, 9 July, 1:20pm	Phillip Oval	Jason McManus
Gungahlin Bulls	46 – 14	Yass Magpies	Saturday, 9 July, 1:20pm	Gungahlin Enclosed Oval	Tristan Brooker
Belconnen United Sharks	0 – 44	Tuggeranong Bushrangers	Saturday, 9 July, 1:20pm	NSWRL HQ Bruce	Jack Black
Goulburn City Bulldogs	18 – 16	West Belconnen Warriors	Sunday, 10 July, 1:20pm	Workers Arena	James Charman
Queanbeyan United Blues		BYE

==== Round 13 ====
Home	Score	Away	Match Information
Home	Score	Away	Date and Time	Venue	Referee
Yass Magpies	20 – 6	Goulburn City Bulldogs	Saturday, 16 July, 1:20pm	Walker Park	Andrew Wheeler
Tuggeranong Bushrangers	26 – 10	Woden Valley Rams	Saturday, 16 July, 1:20pm	Greenway Oval	Liam Richardson
Queanbeyan United Blues	22 – 34	Gungahlin Bulls	Saturday, 16 July, 1:20pm	Seiffert Oval	Jason Severs
Belconnen United Sharks	10 – 38	West Belconnen Warriors	Saturday, 16 July, 1:20pm	NSWRL HQ Bruce	Tristan Brooker
Queanbeyan Kangaroos		BYE

==== Round 14 ====
Home	Score	Away	Match Information
Home	Score	Away	Date and Time	Venue	Referee
Tuggeranong Bushrangers	24 – 48	Yass Magpies	Saturday, 23 July, 1:20pm	Greenway Oval	Katherine Nightingale
Queanbeyan Kangaroos	14 – 10	Queanbeyan United Blues	Saturday, 23 July, 1:20pm	Seears Workwear Oval	Jason McManus
Gungahlin Bulls	56 – 8	Belconnen United Sharks	Saturday, 23 July, 1:20pm	Gungahlin Enclosed Oval	Tristan Brooker
West Belconnen Warriors	16 – 8	Woden Valley Rams	Sunday, 24 July, 1:20pm	Raiders Belconnen	David Charman
Goulburn City Bulldogs		BYE

==== Round 15 ====
Home	Score	Away	Match Information
Home	Score	Away	Date and Time	Venue	Referee
Yass Magpies	38 – 10	Queanbeyan Kangaroos	Saturday, 30 July, 1:20pm	Walker Park	Katherine Nightingale
Woden Valley Rams	10 – 24	Goulburn City Bulldogs	Saturday, 30 July, 1:20pm	Phillip Oval	Tristan Brooker
Queanbeyan United Blues	74 – 6	Belconnen United Sharks	Saturday, 30 July, 1:20pm	Seiffert Oval	Jack Black
West Belconnen Warriors	42 – 0	Tuggeranong Bushrangers	Sunday, 31 July, 1:20pm	Raiders Belconnen	James Charman
Gungahlin Bulls		BYE

==== Round 16 ====
Home	Score	Away	Match Information
Home	Score	Away	Date and Time	Venue	Referee
West Belconnen Warriors	18 – 10	Yass Magpies	Saturday, 13 August, 1:20pm	Raiders Belconnen	Luke Barrow
Queanbeyan Kangaroos	14 – 32	Gungahlin Bulls	Saturday, 13 August, 1:20pm	Seears Workwear Oval	Tristan Brooker
Belconnen United Sharks	24 – 56	Woden Valley Rams	Saturday, 13 August, 1:20pm	NSWRL HQ Bruce	Liam Richardson
Goulburn City Bulldogs	24 – 24	Queanbeyan United Blues	Saturday, 13 August, 1:20pm	Workers Arena	Jason Severs
Tuggeranong Bushrangers		BYE

==== Round 17 ====
Home	Score	Away	Match Information
Home	Score	Away	Date and Time	Venue	Referee
Yass Magpies	18 – 16	Queanbeyan United Blues	Saturday, 20 August, 1:20pm	Walker Park	Tristan Brooker
Tuggeranong Bushrangers	32 – 16	Goulburn City Bulldogs	Saturday, 20 August, 1:20pm	Greenway Oval	Katherine Nightingale
Queanbeyan Kangaroos	16 – 20	West Belconnen Warriors	Saturday, 20 August, 1:20pm	Seears Workwear Oval	Jason Severs
Gungahlin Bulls	34 – 20	Woden Valley Rams	Sunday, 21 August, 1:20pm	Gungahlin Enclosed Oval	Gage Miles
Belconnen United Sharks		BYE

==== Round 18 ====
Home	Score	Away	Match Information
Home	Score	Away	Date and Time	Venue	Referee
Queanbeyan United Blues	42 – 22	West Belconnen Warriors	Saturday, 27 August, 1:20pm	Seiffert Oval	Tristan Brooker
Gungahlin Bulls	38 – 10	Tuggeranong Bushrangers	Saturday, 27 August, 1:20pm	Gungahlin Enclosed Oval	Daniel Wheeler
Goulburn City Bulldogs	8 – 24	Queanbeyan Kangaroos	Saturday, 27 August, 1:20pm	Workers Arena	Liam Richardson
Belconnen United Sharks	6 – 50	Yass Magpies	Saturday, 27 August, 1:20pm	NSWRL HQ Bruce	Jason Severs
Woden Valley Rams		BYE

=== Finals Series ===
Minor & Major Semi-Finals
1	Gungahlin	24
2	Queanbeyan	20
3	Yass	18
4	West Belconnen	10

Preliminary Final
2	Queanbeyan	23
3	Yass	10

Grand Final
1	Gungahlin
2	Queanbeyan

Home	Score	Away	Match Information
Home	Score	Away	Date and Time	Venue	Referee
Minor & Major Semi-Finals
Yass Magpies	18 – 10	West Belconnen Warriors	Saturday, 3 September, 1:20pm	Greenway Oval	Luke Barrow
Gungahlin Bulls	24 – 20	Queanbeyan Kangaroos	Sunday, 4 September, 1:20pm	Raiders Belconnen	James Charman
Preliminary Final
Queanbeyan Kangaroos	23 – 10	Yass Magpies	Sunday, 11 September, 1:20pm	Gungahlin Enclosed Oval	Braiden McIntosh
Grand Final
Gungahlin Bulls	V	Queanbeyan Kangaroos	Sunday, 18 September, 1:40pm	Seiffert Oval	Braiden McIntosh

=== Grand Final ===
Sunday, 18 September
1:40pm

Gungahlin Bulls	v	Queanbeyan Kangaroos

Seiffert Oval, Queanbeyan
Referee: Braiden McIntosh

Team lists:

FB	1
WG	2
CE	3
CE	4
WG	5
FE	6
HB	7
PR	8
HK	9
PR	10
SR	11
SR	12
LK	13
Substitutes:
IC	14
IC	15
IC	16
IC	17
IC	18
IC	19
IC	20
IC	21
IC	22
Coach:

Officials:

Braiden McIntosh (Referee)

Jason McManus (Touch Judge)

Jason Severs (Touch Judge)

FB	1
WG	2
CE	3
CE	4
WG	5
FE	6
HB	7
PR	8
HK	9
PR	10
SR	11
SR	12
LK	13
Substitutes:
IC	14
IC	15
IC	16
IC	18
IC	19
IC	20
IC	22
IC	23
Coach:

== George Tooke Shield (Second Division) ==
There will be 9 teams playing in 2022. 3 teams from Canberra. 6 teams from New South Wales towns surrounding Canberra.

2022 George Tooke Shield
- Duration: 2 April – 3 September
- Teams: 9
- Broadcast partners: Bar TV Sports

Colours	Club	Season	Home ground(s)	Head coach
	Binalong Brahmans	16th season	Binalong Recreation Ground	James Croyden
	Boomanulla Raiders	36th season	Boomanulla Oval	Nathan King
	Boorowa Rovers	14th season	Boorowa Showground	Michael Elkins
	Bungendore Tigers	57th season	Mick Sherd Oval	Jack Bramley
	Cootamundra Bulldogs	2nd season	Les Boyd Oval	Jordyn Ballard
	Crookwell Green Devils	29th season	Crookwell Memorial Oval	Brian Gray
	Harden Hawks	13th season	McLean Oval	Nicholas Hall
	North Canberra Bears	12th season	Kaleen Enclosed Oval	Richard Thorley
	University of Canberra Stars	6th season	Raiders Belconnen	Jack Lemon

=== Ladder ===
Pos	Team	Pld	W	D	L	B	PF	PA	PS	W%
1	Bungendore Tigers	12	9	1	2	2	414	137	75.1	79.1
2	Crookwell Green Devils	12	9	0	3	2	332	150	68.8	75.0
3	Cootamundra Bulldogs	12	9	0	3	2	424	200	67.9	75.0
4	Harden Hawks	13	9	0	4	1	377	242	60.9	69.2
5	North Canberra Bears	13	7	1	5	1	316	214	59.6	57.6
6	Boorowa Rovers	12	6	0	6	2	256	248	50.7	50.0
7	University of Canberra Stars	13	5	0	8	1	268	326	45.1	38.4
8	Binalong Brahmans	12	1	0	11	2	110	414	20.9	8.3
9	Boomanulla Raiders	13	0	0	13	1	100	656	13.2	0.0

Updated to match(es) played on 31 July. Source:
Rules for classification: 1) win percentage; 2) percentage of scoring; 3) points scored

==== Ladder Progression ====
- Numbers highlighted in green indicate that the team finished the round inside the top 5.
- Numbers highlighted in blue indicates the team finished first on the ladder in that round.
- Numbers highlighted in red indicates the team finished last place on the ladder in that round.
- Underlined numbers indicate that the team had a bye during that round.

Pos	Team	1	2	3	4	5	6	7	8	9	10	11	12	13	14	15
1	Bungendore Tigers	100.0	75.0	83.3	87.5	87.5	90.0	91.6	92.8	81.2	83.3	85.0	77.2	77.2	79.1	79.1
2	Crookwell Green Devils	0.0	50.0	66.6	50.0	60.0	50.0	57.1	62.5	62.5	66.6	70.0	72.7	75.0	75.0	75.0
3	Cootamundra Bulldogs	100.0	100.0	100.0	66.6	75.0	60.0	66.6	57.1	62.5	62.5	66.6	70.0	72.7	75.0	75.0
4	Harden Hawks	100.0	100.0	66.6	75.0	60.0	66.6	66.6	71.4	75.0	66.6	70.0	63.6	66.6	69.2	69.2
5	North Canberra Bears	100.0	75.0	50.0	50.0	62.5	70.0	58.3	50.0	56.2	50.0	45.0	50.0	54.1	57.6	57.6
6	Boorowa Rovers	0.0	0.0	50.0	66.6	50.0	60.0	50.0	57.1	62.5	66.6	60.0	60.0	54.5	50.0	50.0
7	University of Canberra Stars	0.0	0.0	0.0	33.3	50.0	40.0	50.0	42.8	37.5	44.4	40.0	45.4	41.6	38.4	38.4
8	Binalong Brahmans	0.0	50.0	33.3	25.0	20.0	16.6	14.2	14.2	12.5	11.1	11.1	10.0	9.0	8.3	8.3
9	Boomanulla Raiders	0.0	0.0	0.0	0.0	0.0	0.0	0.0	0.0	0.0	0.0	0.0	0.0	0.0	0.0	0.0

=== Season Results ===
==== Round 1 ====
Home	Score	Away	Match Information
Home	Score	Away	Date and Time	Venue	Referee
Binalong Brahmans	16 – 26	North Canberra Bears	Saturday, 2 April, 2:15pm	Binalong Recreation Oval	Jack Black
University of Canberra Stars	12 – 26	Harden Hawks	Saturday, 2 April, 2:30pm	Raiders Belconnen	Nathan Gauci
Cootamundra Bulldogs	36 – 14	Boomanulla Raiders	Saturday, 2 April, 2:30pm	Les Boyd Oval	Timothy Bailey
Bungendore Tigers	26 – 0	Crookwell Green Devils	Saturday, 2 April, 2:30pm	Mick Sherd Oval	Houshyar Fallah
Boorowa Rovers		BYE

==== Round 2 ====
Home	Score	Away	Match Information
Home	Score	Away	Date and Time	Venue	Referee
Crookwell Green Devils	28 – 10	University of Canberra Stars	Saturday, 9 April, 1:30pm	Crookwell Memorial Oval	Katherine Nightingale
North Canberra Bears	0 – 0*	Bungendore Tigers	Saturday, 9 April, 2:30pm	Kaleen Enclosed Oval	N/A
Boomanulla Raiders	12 – 24	Binalong Brahmans	Saturday, 9 April, 2:30pm	Boomanulla Oval	Daniel Wheeler
Harden Hawks	24 – 12	Boorowa Rovers	Saturday, 9 April, 3:00pm	McLean Oval	Tristan Brooker
Cootamundra Bulldogs		BYE

==== Round 3 ====
Home	Score	Away	Match Information
Home	Score	Away	Date and Time	Venue	Referee
Binalong Brahmans	6 – 48	Cootamundra Bulldogs	Saturday, 23 April, 2:15pm	Binalong Recreation Oval	Michael Bayley
Bungendore Tigers	44 – 20	Harden Hawks	Saturday, 23 April, 2:30pm	Mick Sherd Oval	David Charman
Boorowa Rovers	50 – 6	Boomanulla Raiders	Saturday, 23 April, 2:30pm	Boorowa Showground	Nathan Gauci
Crookwell Green Devils	32 – 6	North Canberra Bears	Sunday, 24 April, 2:30pm	Crookwell Memorial Oval	James Gould
University of Canberra Stars		BYE

==== Round 4 ====
Home	Score	Away	Match Information
Home	Score	Away	Date and Time	Venue	Referee
Boorowa Rovers	18 – 0	Binalong Brahmans	Friday, 29 April, 8:10pm	Boorowa Showground	James Gould
Cootamundra Bulldogs	18 – 22	University of Canberra Stars	Saturday, 30 April, 2:30pm	Les Boyd Oval	Houshyar Fallah
Boomanulla Raiders	0 – 82	Bungendore Tigers	Saturday, 30 April, 2:30pm	Boomanulla Oval	Scott Jopling
Harden Hawks	26 – 24	Crookwell Green Devils	Saturday, 30 April, 3:00pm	McLean Oval	Timothy Maloney
North Canberra Bears		BYE

==== Round 5 ====
Home	Score	Away	Match Information
Home	Score	Away	Date and Time	Venue	Referee
University of Canberra Stars	46 – 4	Boomanulla Raiders	Saturday, 7 May, 2:30pm	Raiders Belconnen	Scott Jopling
North Canberra Bears	38 – 12	Harden Hawks	Saturday, 7 May, 2:30pm	Kaleen Enclosed Oval	David Charman
Crookwell Green Devils	42 – 6	Binalong Brahmans	Saturday, 7 May, 2:30pm	Crookwell Memorial Oval	Jason Severs
Cootamundra Bulldogs	38 – 34	Boorowa Rovers	Saturday, 7 May, 2:30pm	Les Boyd Oval	Jack Black
Bungendore Tigers		BYE

==== Round 6 ====
Home	Score	Away	Match Information
Home	Score	Away	Date and Time	Venue	Referee
Binalong Brahmans	10 – 28	Bungendore Tigers	Saturday, 21 May, 2:15pm	Binalong Recreation Oval	Tristan Brooker
North Canberra Bears	36 – 12	University of Canberra Stars	Saturday, 21 May, 2:30pm	Kaleen Enclosed Oval	Daniel Wheeler
Boorowa Rovers	20 – 10	Crookwell Green Devils	Saturday, 21 May, 2:30pm	Boorowa Showground	Nathan Gauci
Harden Hawks	24 – 16	Cootamundra Bulldogs	Saturday, 21 May, 3:00pm	McLean Oval	Houshyar Fallah
Boomanulla Raiders		BYE

==== Round 7 ====
Home	Score	Away	Match Information
Home	Score	Away	Date and Time	Venue	Referee
University of Canberra Stars	22 – 12	Binalong Brahmans	Saturday, 28 May, 2:30pm	Raiders Belconnen	Daniel Wheeler
Cootamundra Bulldogs	26 – 4	North Canberra Bears	Saturday, 28 May, 2:30pm	Les Boyd Oval	Andrew Nightingale
Bungendore Tigers	56 – 0	Boorowa Rovers	Saturday, 28 May, 2:30pm	Mick Sherd Oval	Nathan Gauci
Crookwell Green Devils	38 – 6	Boomanulla Raiders	Sunday, 29 May, 2:30pm	Crookwell Memorial Oval	Jason Severs
Harden Hawks		BYE

==== Round 8 ====
Home	Score	Away	Match Information
Home	Score	Away	Date and Time	Venue	Referee
Bungendore Tigers	22 – 14	University of Canberra Stars	Saturday, 4 June, 2:30pm	Mick Sherd Oval	Jack Black
Boomanulla Raiders	0 – 76	Harden Hawks	Saturday, 4 June, 2:30pm	Boomanulla Oval	Daniel Wheeler
Boorowa Rovers	18 – 12	North Canberra Bears	Saturday, 4 June, 3:30pm	Boorowa Showground	Elijah Fernance
Crookwell Green Devils	32 – 18	Cootamundra Bulldogs	Sunday, 5 June, 2:30pm	Crookwell Memorial Oval	Jason Severs
Binalong Brahmans		BYE

==== Round 9 ====
Home	Score	Away	Match Information
Home	Score	Away	Date and Time	Venue	Referee
University of Canberra Stars	4 – 48	Boorowa Rovers	Saturday, 18 June, 2:30pm	Raiders Belconnen	Daniel Wheeler
North Canberra Bears	50 – 12	Boomanulla Raiders	Saturday, 18 June, 2:30pm	Kaleen Enclosed Oval	Tristan Brooker
Bungendore Tigers	20 – 22	Cootamundra Bulldogs	Saturday, 18 June, 2:30pm	Mick Sherd Oval	David Charman
Harden Hawks	46 – 6	Binalong Brahmans	Saturday, 18 June, 3:00pm	McLean Oval	Houshyar Fallah
Crookwell Green Devils		BYE

==== Round 10 ====
Home	Score	Away	Match Information
Home	Score	Away	Date and Time	Venue	Referee
Binalong Brahmans	16 – 24	Boorowa Rovers	Saturday, 25 June, 2:15pm	Binalong Recreation Oval	Michael Bayley
North Canberra Bears	10 – 28	Crookwell Green Devils	Saturday, 25 June, 2:30pm	Kaleen Enclosed Oval	David Charman
Boomanulla Raiders	12 – 34	University of Canberra Stars	Saturday, 25 June, 2:30pm	Boomanulla Oval	Daniel Wheeler
Harden Hawks	29 – 32	Bungendore Tigers	Saturday, 25 June, 3:00pm	McLean Oval	Houshyar Fallah
Cootamundra Bulldogs		BYE

==== Round 11 ====
Home	Score	Away	Match Information
Home	Score	Away	Date and Time	Venue	Referee
University of Canberra Stars	10 – 36	Crookwell Green Devils	Saturday, 2 July, 2:30pm	Raiders Belconnen	Daniel Wheeler
Bungendore Tigers	28 – 6	North Canberra Bears	Saturday, 2 July, 2:30pm	Mick Sherd Oval	Katherine Nightingale
Boorowa Rovers	6 – 12	Harden Hawks	Saturday, 2 July, 2:30pm	Boorowa Showground	Ross Walters
Boomanulla Raiders	12 – 70	Cootamundra Bulldogs	Saturday, 2 July, 2:30pm	Boomanulla Oval	Liam Richardson
Binalong Brahmans		BYE

==== Round 12 ====
Home	Score	Away	Match Information
Home	Score	Away	Date and Time	Venue	Referee
Binalong Brahmans	6 – 40	University of Canberra Stars	Saturday, 9 July, 2:15pm	Binalong Recreation Oval	Liam Richardson
Cootamundra Bulldogs	22 – 10	Harden Hawks	Saturday, 9 July, 2:30pm	Les Boyd Oval	Ross Walters
Boomanulla Raiders	6 – 44	North Canberra Bears	Saturday, 9 July, 2:30pm	Boomanulla Oval	Daniel Wheeler
Crookwell Green Devils	26 – 6	Bungendore Tigers	Sunday, 10 July, 2:30pm	Crookwell Memorial Oval	Gage Miles
Boorowa Rovers		BYE

==== Round 13 ====
Home	Score	Away	Match Information
Home	Score	Away	Date and Time	Venue	Referee
Binalong Brahmans	0 – 22*	Harden Hawks	Saturday, 23 July, 2:15pm	Binalong Recreation Oval	N/A
University of Canberra Stars	12 – 38	North Canberra Bears	Saturday, 23 July, 2:30pm	Raiders Belconnen	Daniel Wheeler
Boorowa Rovers	14 – 24	Cootamundra Bulldogs	Saturday, 23 July, 2:30pm	Boorowa Showground	Houshyar Fallah
Boomanulla Raiders	6 – 36	Crookwell Green Devils	Saturday, 23 July, 2:30pm	Boomanulla Oval	Jason Severs
Bungendore Tigers		BYE

==== Round 14 ====
Home	Score	Away	Match Information
Home	Score	Away	Date and Time	Venue	Referee
North Canberra Bears	46 – 12	Boorowa Rovers	Saturday, 30 July, 2:30pm	Kaleen Enclosed Oval	Ross Walters
Cootamundra Bulldogs	86 – 8	Binalong Brahmans	Saturday, 30 July, 2:30pm	Les Boyd Oval	Jason Severs
Bungendore Tigers	70 – 10	Boomanulla Raiders	Saturday, 30 July, 2:30pm	Mick Sherd Oval	Liam Richardson
Harden Hawks	40 – 30	University of Canberra Stars	Saturday, 30 July, 3:00pm	McLean Oval	Houshyar Fallah
Crookwell Green Devils		BYE

==== Round 15 ====
Home	Score	Away	Match Information
Home	Score	Away	Date and Time	Venue	Referee
Binalong Brahmans	V	Boomanulla Raiders	Cancelled	Binalong Recreation Oval	TBA
University of Canberra Stars	V	Bungendore Tigers	Cancelled	Raiders Belconnen	TBA
North Canberra Bears	V	Cootamundra Bulldogs	Cancelled	Kaleen Enclosed Oval	TBA
Crookwell Green Devils	V	Boorowa Rovers	Cancelled	Crookwell Memorial Oval	TBA
Harden Hawks		BYE

=== Finals Series ===
Qualifying Final
2	Crookwell	18
3	Cootamundra	4
4	Harden	14
5	North Canberra	10

Major Semi-Final
1	Bungendore	14
2	Crookwell	13
Minor Semi-Final
3	Cootamundra	12
4	Harden	11

Preliminary Final
2	Crookwell	32
3	Cootamundra	4

Grand Final
1	Bungendore	10
2	Crookwell	14

Home	Score	Away	Match Information
Home	Score	Away	Date and Time	Venue	Referee
Qualifying & Elimination Finals
Crookwell Green Devils	18 – 4	Cootamundra Bulldogs	Saturday, 13 August, 2:30pm	Crookwell Memorial Oval	Houshyar Fallah
Harden Hawks	14 – 10	North Canberra Bears	Saturday, 13 August, 2:30pm	McLean Oval	David Charman
Minor & Major Semi-Finals
Cootamundra Bulldogs	12 – 11	Harden Hawks	Saturday, 20 August, 3:00pm	Les Boyd Oval	Houshyar Fallah
Bungendore Tigers	14 – 13	Crookwell Green Devils	Saturday, 20 August, 3:00pm	Mick Sherd Oval	David Charman
Preliminary Final
Crookwell Green Devils	32 – 4	Cootamundra Bulldogs	Saturday, 27 August, 3:00pm	Crookwell Memorial Oval	David Charman
Grand Final
Bungendore Tigers	10 – 14	Crookwell Green Devils	Saturday, 3 September, 3:00pm	Mick Sherd Oval	David Charman

=== Grand Final ===
Saturday, 3 September
3:00pm

Bungendore Tigers	10 – 14	Crookwell Green Devils
Tries: Carl Johnson (53') 1 Luke Colquhoun (61') 1 Goals: Ryan Tuckwell 1/2 (62')	1st: 0 – 4; 2nd: 10 – 10	Tries: 1 (65') Brock Gray; Goals: 5/5 Dion Aramoana (31' pen, 35' pen, 46' pen, 67', 70' pen)

Mick Sherd Oval, Bungendore
Referee: David Charman

Team lists:

FB	1	Ryan Tuckwell
WG	2	Matt McKenna
CE	3	Luke Colquhoun
CE	4	Michael Gordon
WG	5	Dyllan Malley
FE	6	Kyle High
HB	7	Benjamin Rayner
PR	8	Patrick Pryor
HK	9	Chris Johansen
PR	10	Bradley Laurent
SR	11	Sean Beudeker
SR	12	Jack Edwards
LK	13	Brett Solomon
Substitutes:
IC	14	Cameron Guihot
IC	15	Alexander Evans
IC	16	Jason Farnhill
IC	17	Jacob Rayner
IC	18	Jason Kolber
IC	19	Peter Mortimer
IC	20	Jordan Webster
IC	21	Brendon Bassett
IC	22	Carl Johnson
Coach:
Jack Bramley

Officials:

David Charman (Referee)

Matthew Hall (Touch Judge)

Houshyar Fallah (Touch Judge)

FB	1	Charles Dawson
WG	2	Joshua Paterson
CE	3	Daniel Selmes
CE	4	Aaron Gray
WG	5	Jacob Paterson
FE	6	Jayden Aramoana
HB	7	Nathan Price
PR	8	Dion Aramoana
HK	9	Tyler Keller
PR	10	Brock Gray
SR	11	Rhys Secomb
SR	12	Jayden Eddy
LK	13	Andy Leonard
Substitutes:
IC	14	Joshua Cummins
IC	15	Joshua Waters
IC	16	Bailey Anderson
IC	18	Noah Davis
IC	19	Nicholas Selmes
IC	20	Darnell Rowles
IC	22	Luke Cummins
IC	23	Max O'Brien
Coach:
Brian Gray

== Katrina Fanning Shield (Open Women's Tackle) ==
=== Teams ===
Colours	Club	Home ground(s)	Head coach
	Boomanulla Raiders	Boomanulla Oval	Maurice Walker
	Goulburn City Bulldogs	Workers Arena	Wayne Blackwell
	Harden Worhawks	McLean Oval	Mellissa Ings
	Queanbeyan United Blues	Seiffert Blues	Blake Murray
	South Coast United Marlins	Mackay Park	Greg McEwen
	Tuggeranong Bushrangers	Greenway Oval	Jason Kelly
	University of Canberra Stars	Raiders Belconnen	Michael Kociolek
	Woden Valley Rams	Phillip Oval	Anthony Willey
	Yass Magpies	Walker Park	Brendon Housden

=== Ladder ===
Pos	Team	Pld	W	D	L	B	PF	PA	PD	Pts	Qualification
1	Yass Magpies W	11	11	0	0	2	456	34	+422	26	Qualification to Division 1 Finals Series
2	Goulburn City Bulldogs W	11	9	0	2	2	275	110	+165	22	Qualification to Division 1 Finals Series
3	Woden Valley Rams W	12	9	0	3	1	312	116	+196	20	Qualification to Division 1 Finals Series
4	Queanbeyan United Blues W	11	7	0	4	2	434	80	+354	18	Qualification to Division 1 Finals Series
5	Tuggeranong Bushrangers W	11	5	0	6	2	184	197	−13	14	Qualification to Division 1 Finals Series
6	South Coast United Marlins	11	5	0	6	2	154	185	−31	14	Qualification to Division 2 Finals Series
7	University of Canberra Stars W	11	3	0	8	2	94	382	−288	10	Qualification to Division 2 Finals Series
8	Harden Worhawks	11	1	0	10	2	68	404	−336	6	Qualification to Division 2 Finals Series
9	Boomanulla Raiders W	11	0	0	11	2	29	498	−469	4	Qualification to Division 2 Finals Series

Updated to match(es) played on 14 August. Source:
Rules for classification: 1) points; 2) point difference; 3) points scored

==== Ladder Progression ====
- Numbers highlighted in green indicate that the team finished the round inside the top 5.
- Numbers highlighted in yellow indicate that the team finished the round outside the top 5.
- Numbers highlighted in blue indicates the team finished first on the ladder in that round.
- Underlined numbers indicate that the team had a bye during that round.

Pos	Team	1	2	4	5	6	7	8	9	10	3	11	12	13	14
1	Yass Magpies W	2	4	6	8	10	12	14	16	18	20	22	24	24	26
2	Goulburn City Bulldogs W	0	2	4	6	8	10	12	14	14	16	18	20	20	22
3	Woden Valley Rams W	2	4	4	6	8	10	12	12	14	16	18	18	18	20
4	Queanbeyan United Blues W	2	4	6	6	6	8	8	10	12	14	16	18	18	18
5	Tuggeranong Bushrangers W	0	0	2	4	4	6	8	8	8	10	10	12	12	14
6	South Coast United Marlins	2	2	4	4	6	6	6	8	10	10	12	14	14	14
7	University of Canberra Stars W	0	2	2	4	4	4	6	6	6	6	8	8	8	10
8	Harden Worhawks	0	0	0	0	2	2	2	4	4	4	6	6	6	6
9	Boomanulla Raiders W	2	2	2	2	2	2	2	2	4	4	4	4	4	4

=== Season Results ===
==== Round 1 ====
Home	Score	Away	Match Information
Home	Score	Away	Date and Time	Venue	Referee
Tuggeranong Bushrangers	14 – 28	Woden Valley Rams	Saturday, 30 April, 10:45am	Greenway Oval	Heather Hall
Harden Worhawks	0 – 44	Queanbeyan United Blues	Saturday, 30 April, 11:00am	McLean Oval	Jessica Charman
South Coast United Marlins	8 – 0	University of Canberra Stars	Saturday, 30 April, 11:00am	Mackay Park	TBA
Yass Magpies	26 – 18	Goulburn City Bulldogs	Saturday, 30 April, 12:00pm	Walker Park	David Charman
Boomanulla Raiders		BYE

==== Round 2 ====
Home	Score	Away	Match Information
Home	Score	Away	Date and Time	Venue	Referee
Woden Valley Rams	46 – 0	Harden Worhawks	Saturday, 7 May, 9:30am	Phillip Oval	Jessica Charman
University of Canberra Stars	30 – 6	Boomanulla Raiders	Saturday, 7 May, 12:00pm	Raiders Belconnen	Mark Ryan
Yass Magpies	42 – 0	Tuggeranong Bushrangers	Saturday, 7 May, 12:00pm	Walker Park	Heather Hall
Queanbeyan United Blues	28 – 0	South Coast United Marlins	Saturday, 7 May, 12:00pm	Seiffert Oval	James Gould
Goulburn City Bulldogs		BYE

==== Round 3 ====
Home	Score	Away	Match Information
Home	Score	Away	Date and Time	Venue	Referee
South Coast United Marlins	0 – 47*	Woden Valley Rams	Saturday, 16 July, 1:30pm	Raiders Belconnen	N/A
University of Canberra Stars	0 – 60	Queanbeyan United Blues	Saturday, 16 July, 10:30am	Raiders Belconnen	Jessica Charman
Harden Worhawks	4 – 38	Tuggeranong Bushrangers	Saturday, 16 July, 12:00pm	Raiders Belconnen	Heather Hall
Goulburn City Bulldogs	47* – 0	Boomanulla Raiders	Saturday, 16 July, 3:00pm	Raiders Belconnen	N/A
Yass Magpies		BYE

==== Round 4 ====
Home	Score	Away	Match Information
Home	Score	Away	Date and Time	Venue	Referee
Goulburn City Bulldogs	32 – 16	Woden Valley Rams	Saturday, 21 May, 10:40am	Workers Arena	Heather Hall
Tuggeranong Bushrangers	32 – 0	University of Canberra Stars	Saturday, 21 May, 10:45am	Greenway Oval	Jessica Charman
Boomanulla Raiders	0 – 82	Yass Magpies	Saturday, 21 May, 1:10pm	Boomanulla Oval	Mark Ryan
South Coast United Marlins	22 – 10	Harden Worhawks	Sunday, 22 May, 11:00am	Mackay Park	TBA
Queanbeyan United Blues		BYE

==== Round 5 ====
Home	Score	Away	Match Information
Home	Score	Away	Date and Time	Venue	Referee
Woden Valley Rams	5* – 0	Boomanulla Raiders	Saturday, 28 May, 9:30am	Phillip Oval	N/A
University of Canberra Stars	14 – 8	Harden Worhawks	Saturday, 28 May, 12:00pm	Raiders Belconnen	Christopher Nightingale
Yass Magpies	5* – 0	South Coast United Marlins	Saturday, 28 May, 12:00pm	Walker Park	N/A
Queanbeyan United Blues	12 – 16	Goulburn City Bulldogs	Saturday, 28 May, 12:00pm	Seiffert Oval	Heather Hall
Tuggeranong Bushrangers		BYE

==== Round 6 ====
Home	Score	Away	Match Information
Home	Score	Away	Date and Time	Venue	Referee
Woden Valley Rams	20* – 0	University of Canberra Stars	Saturday, 4 June, 9:30am	Phillip Oval	N/A
Boomanulla Raiders	6 – 32	Harden Worhawks	Saturday, 4 June, 12:00pm	Boomanulla Oval	Jason Severs
Queanbeyan United Blues	6 – 8	Yass Magpies	Saturday, 4 June, 12:00pm	Seiffert Oval	Jessica Charman
Goulburn City Bulldogs	32 – 0	Tuggeranong Bushrangers	Sunday, 5 June, 10:40am	Workers Arena	Mario Prpic
South Coast United Marlins		BYE

==== Round 7 ====
Home	Score	Away	Match Information
Home	Score	Away	Date and Time	Venue	Referee
Tuggeranong Bushrangers	16 – 12	South Coast United Marlins	Saturday, 18 June, 10:40am	Greenway Oval	Mario Prpic
Yass Magpies	86 – 0	University of Canberra Stars	Saturday, 18 June, 12:00pm	Walker Park	Heather Hall
Harden Worhawks	6 – 14	Goulburn City Bulldogs	Saturday, 18 June, 12:20pm	McLean Oval	Jessica Charman
Queanbeyan United Blues	72 – 0	Boomanulla Raiders	Saturday, 18 June, 1:00pm	Kaleen Enclosed Oval	Katherine Nightingale
Woden Valley Rams		BYE

==== Round 8 ====
Home	Score	Away	Match Information
Home	Score	Away	Date and Time	Venue	Referee
Queanbeyan United Blues	16 – 22	Woden Valley Rams	Friday, 24 June, 5:30pm	GIO Stadium	Katherine Nightingale
Harden Worhawks	0 – 58	Yass Magpies	Saturday, 25 June, 12:15pm	McLean Oval	Geordie Doherty
Boomanulla Raiders	4 – 50	Tuggeranong Bushrangers	Saturday, 25 June, 1:00pm	Boomanulla Oval	Mark Ryan
Goulburn City Bulldogs	30 – 4	South Coast United Marlins	Sunday, 26 June, 10:40am	Workers Arena	Heather Hall
University of Canberra Stars		BYE

==== Round 9 ====
Home	Score	Away	Match Information
Home	Score	Away	Date and Time	Venue	Referee
Woden Valley Rams	10 – 30	Yass Magpies	Saturday, 2 July, 9:30am	Phillip Oval	Jessica Charman
Tuggeranong Bushrangers	6 – 28	Queanbeyan United Blues	Saturday, 2 July, 10:45am	Greenway Oval	Jason Severs
University of Canberra Stars	0 – 52	Goulburn City Bulldogs	Saturday, 2 July, 12:00pm	Raiders Belconnen	Geordie Doherty
Boomanulla Raiders	9 – 32	South Coast United Marlins	Saturday, 2 July, 1:00pm	Boomanulla Oval	Mario Prpic
Harden Worhawks		BYE

==== Round 10 ====
Home	Score	Away	Match Information
Home	Score	Away	Date and Time	Venue	Referee
University of Canberra Stars	10 – 32	South Coast United Marlins	Saturday, 9 July, 10:00am	Raiders Belconnen	James Gould
Woden Valley Rams	16 – 12	Tuggeranong Bushrangers	Saturday, 9 July, 11:00am	Phillip Oval	Jessica Charman
Queanbeyan United Blues	70 – 0	Harden Worhawks	Saturday, 9 July, 12:00pm	Seiffert Oval	Jason Severs
Goulburn City Bulldogs	0 – 20	Yass Magpies	Sunday, 10 July, 12:00pm	Workers Arena	Heather Hall
Boomanulla Raiders		BYE

==== Round 11 ====
Home	Score	Away	Match Information
Home	Score	Away	Date and Time	Venue	Referee
Tuggeranong Bushrangers	0 – 23*	Yass Magpies	Saturday, 23 July, 10:45am	Greenway Oval	N/A
Boomanulla Raiders	0 – 70	Woden Valley Rams	Saturday, 23 July, 1:10pm	Boomanulla Oval	Heather Hall
University of Canberra Stars	BYE	Goulburn City Bulldogs
Harden Worhawks	BYE	Queanbeyan United Blues
South Coast United Marlins	BYE

==== Round 12 ====
Home	Score	Away	Match Information
Home	Score	Away	Date and Time	Venue	Referee
Woden Valley Rams	6 – 12	Goulburn City Bulldogs	Saturday, 30 July, 9:30am	Phillip Oval	Heather Hall
Queanbeyan United Blues	78 – 6	University of Canberra Stars	Saturday, 30 July, 10:45am	Seiffert Oval	Geordie Doherty
Yass Magpies	76 – 0	Harden Worhawks	Saturday, 30 July, 12:00pm	Walker Park	Jessica Charman
South Coast United Marlins	44 – 4	Boomanulla Raiders	Sunday, 31 July, 12:45pm	Mackay Park	TBA
Tuggeranong Bushrangers		BYE

==== Round 13 ====
Home	Score	Away	Match Information
Home	Score	Away	Date and Time	Venue	Referee
South Coast United Marlins	V	Tuggeranong Bushrangers	Cancelled	Mackay Park	TBA
Harden Worhawks	V	Goulburn City Bulldogs	Cancelled	McLean Oval	TBA
Boomanulla Raiders	V	Queanbeyan United Blues	Cancelled	Boomanulla Oval	TBA
University of Canberra Stars	V	Yass Magpies	Cancelled	Raiders Belconnen	TBA
Woden Valley Rams		BYE

==== Round 14 ====
Home	Score	Away	Match Information
Home	Score	Away	Date and Time	Venue	Referee
Harden Worhawks	8 – 16	Tuggeranong Bushrangers	Saturday, 13 August, 11:45am	McLean Oval	Heather Hall
Boomanulla Raiders	0 – 34	University of Canberra Stars	Saturday, 13 August, 1:10pm	Boomanulla Oval	Jessica Charman
South Coast United Marlins	0 – 26	Woden Valley Rams	Sunday, 14 August, 11:00am	Mackay Park	TBA
Goulburn City Bulldogs	22 – 20	Queanbeyan United Blues	Sunday, 14 August, 12:05pm	GIO Stadium	Katherine Nightingale
Yass Magpies		BYE

=== Division 1 Finals Series ===
Qualifying Final
2	Goulburn City	34
3	Woden Valley	22
4	Queanbeyan United	64
5	Tuggeranong	0

Major Semi-Final
1	Yass	14
2	Goulburn City	10
Minor Semi-Final
3	Woden Valley	26
4	Queanbeyan United	14

Preliminary Final
2	Goulburn City	20
3	Woden Valley	30

Grand Final
1	Yass
3	Woden Valley

Home	Score	Away	Match Information
Home	Score	Away	Date and Time	Venue	Referee
Qualifying & Elimination Finals
Queanbeyan United Blues	64 – 0	Tuggeranong Bushrangers	Saturday, 27 August, 10:00am	Raiders Belconnen	Mark Ryan
Goulburn City Bulldogs	34 – 22	Woden Valley Rams	Saturday, 27 August, 11:30am	Raiders Belconnen	Katherine Nightingale
Minor & Major Semi-Finals
Woden Valley Rams	26 – 14	Queanbeyan United Blues	Saturday, 3 September, 12:00pm	Greenway Oval	Katherine Nightingale
Yass Magpies	14 – 10	Goulburn City Bulldogs	Sunday, 4 September, 12:00pm	Raiders Belconnen	Jason Severs
Preliminary Final
Goulburn City Bulldogs	20 – 30	Woden Valley Rams	Sunday, 11 September, 12:00pm	Gungahlin Enclosed Oval	Katherine Nightingale
Grand Final
Yass Magpies	V	Woden Valley Rams	Sunday, 18 September, 12:10pm	Seiffert Oval	Katherine Nightingale

=== Grand Final ===
Sunday, 18 September
12:10pm

Yass Magpies	v	Woden Valley Rams

Seiffert Oval, Queanbeyan
Referee: Katherine Nightingale

Team lists:

FB	1
WG	2
CE	3
CE	4
WG	5
FE	6
HB	7
PR	8
HK	9
PR	10
SR	11
SR	12
LK	13
Substitutes:
IC	14
IC	15
IC	16
IC	17
IC	18
IC	19
IC	20
IC	21
IC	22
Coach:

Officials:

Katherine Nightingale (Referee)

Jessica Charman (Touch Judge)

Heather Hall (Touch Judge)

FB	1
WG	2
CE	3
CE	4
WG	5
FE	6
HB	7
PR	8
HK	9
PR	10
SR	11
SR	12
LK	13
Substitutes:
IC	14
IC	15
IC	16
IC	18
IC	19
IC	20
IC	22
IC	23
Coach:

=== Division 2 Finals Series ===
Minor & Major Semi-Finals
6	South Coast United	32
7	University of Canberra	2
8	Harden	24
9	Boomanulla	0

Preliminary Final
7	University of Canberra	4
8	Harden	42

Grand Final
6	South Coast United	4
8	Harden	10

Home	Score	Away	Match Information
Home	Score	Away	Date and Time	Venue	Referee
Minor & Major Semi-Finals
Harden Worhawks	24 – 0	Boomanulla Raiders	Saturday, 20 August, 12:20pm	Les Boyd Oval	Jessica Charman
South Coast United Marlins	32 – 2	University of Canberra Stars	Saturday, 20 August, 1:50pm	Mick Sherd Oval	Heather Hall
Preliminary Final
University of Canberra Stars	4 – 42	Harden Worhawks	Saturday, 27 August, 12:10pm	Crookwell Memorial Oval	Michael Bayley
Grand Final
South Coast United Marlins	4 – 10	Harden Worhawks	Saturday, 3 September, 12:00pm	Mick Sherd Oval	Michael Bayley

=== Grand Final ===
Saturday, 3 September
12:00pm

South Coast United Marlins	4 – 10	Harden Worhawks
Tries: Bree-Anne Moreton (40') 1 Goals: Emma Walters 0/1	1st: 0 – 6; 2nd: 4 – 4	Tries: 1 (29') Mollie Hogan; 1 (33') Ua Ravu; Goals: 1/2 Hunter Ings (30')

Mick Sherd Oval, Bungendore
Referee: Michael Bayley

Team lists:

FB	1	Emma Walters
WG	2	Emma Stammers
CE	3	Koorinya Moreton
CE	4	Jacquiline Pele
WG	5	Jazlyn Breust
FE	6	Dzhane Lole-Ngarima
HB	7	Abbey Montgomery
PR	8	Colby Heron
HK	9	Christie Leigh Robinson
PR	10	Rachael Kincaid
SR	11	Jada Olsen-Flanagan
SR	12	Stephanie Bond
LK	13	Bree-Anne Moreton
Substitutes:
IC	14	Tayissa Brierley
IC	15	Cherie Callaghan
IC	16	Shayla Moreton-Stewart
IC	17	Emily France
IC	18	Isabella Anastasi
IC	19	Kayla Tyrrell
IC	20	Telesia Sekona
Coach:
Greg McEwen

Officials:

Michael Bayley (Referee)

Jack Black (Touch Judge)

Mario Prpic (Touch Judge)

FB	7	Hunter Ings
WG	2	Valda Kimber
CE	5	Marinda Little
CE	4	Abbie Grant
WG	3	Charleen Grant
FE	6	Ua Ravu
HB	1	Courtney-Lee Picker
PR	8	Kristy Brown
HK	9	Chloe Wade
PR	10	Jikayia Little
SR	11	Visharn Edwards
SR	12	Mollie Hogan
LK	13	Mellissa Ings
Substitutes:
IC	14	Sophie Mewton
IC	16	Jessica White
IC	18	Roshan Smith
IC	19	Loren Daley
IC	22	Alexandria Green
Coach:
Mellissa Ings

== Under 19s ==
=== Teams ===
Colours	Club	Home ground(s)	Head coach
	Belconnen United Sharks	NSWRL HQ Bruce	Matthew McIntyre
	Cootamundra Bulldogs	Les Boyd Oval	Stephen Howse
	Crookwell Green Devils	Crookwell Memorial Oval	TBA
	Goulburn City Bulldogs	Workers Arena	Shane McCallum
	Gungahlin Bulls	Gungahlin Enclosed Oval	Patrick Clark
	Queanbeyan United Blues	Seiffert Oval	Brenden Bradley
	Tuggeranong Bushrangers	Greenway Oval	Greg Bell
	Woden Valley Rams	Phillip Oval	Adam Smith

=== Ladder ===
Pos	Team	Pld	W	D	L	B	PF	PA	PD	Pts	Qualification
1	Queanbeyan United Blues U19s	13	11	0	2	0	398	194	+204	22	Qualification to Division 1 Finals Series
2	Goulburn City Bulldogs U19s	13	9	0	4	0	306	141	+165	18	Qualification to Division 1 Finals Series
3	Belconnen United Sharks U19s	13	9	0	4	0	382	222	+160	18	Qualification to Division 1 Finals Series
4	Gungahlin Bulls U19s	13	9	0	4	0	287	168	+119	18	Qualification to Division 1 Finals Series
5	Woden Valley Rams U19s	13	7	0	6	0	344	222	+122	14	Qualification to Division 2 Finals Series
6	Crookwell Green Devils U19s	13	4	0	9	0	180	304	−124	8	Qualification to Division 2 Finals Series
7	Tuggeranong Bushrangers U19s	13	3	0	10	0	202	282	−80	6	Qualification to Division 2 Finals Series
8	Cootamundra Bulldogs U19s	13	0	0	13	0	86	648	−562	0	Qualification to Division 2 Finals Series

Updated to match(es) played on 13 August. Source:
Rules for classification: 1) points; 2) point difference; 3) points scored

==== Ladder Progression ====
- Numbers highlighted in green indicate that the team finished the round inside the top 4.
- Numbers highlighted in blue indicates the team finished first on the ladder in that round.
- Numbers highlighted in red indicates the team finished last place on the ladder in that round.
- Underlined numbers indicate that the team had a bye during that round.

Pos	Team	1	2	3	4	5	6	7	8	9	10	11	12	13	14
1	Queanbeyan United Blues U19s	2	4	6	8	8	10	12	14	16	18	20	20	20	22
2	Goulburn City Bulldogs U19s	0	2	4	4	6	8	10	10	12	14	16	18	18	18
3	Belconnen United Sharks U19s	2	4	6	8	10	12	12	14	14	16	16	18	18	18
4	Gungahlin Bulls U19s	2	2	2	4	6	8	10	12	12	12	14	16	16	18
5	Woden Valley Rams U19s	2	4	4	4	4	4	4	6	8	10	12	12	12	14
6	Crookwell Green Devils U19s	0	0	0	2	4	4	4	4	4	4	4	6	6	8
7	Tuggeranong Bushrangers U19s	0	0	2	2	2	2	4	4	6	6	6	6	6	6
8	Cootamundra Bulldogs U19s	0	0	0	0	0	0	0	0	0	0	0	0	0	0

=== Season Results ===
==== Round 1 ====
Home	Score	Away	Match Information
Home	Score	Away	Date and Time	Venue	Referee
Crookwell Green Devils	0 – 26	Woden Valley Rams	Saturday, 30 April, 10:30am	Seears Workwear Oval	Andrew Nightingale
Goulburn City Bulldogs	10 – 11	Gungahlin Bulls	Saturday, 30 April, 10:30am	Walker Park	Mark Ryan
Tuggeranong Bushrangers	0 – 22	Belconnen United Sharks	Saturday, 30 April, 12:00pm	Greenway Oval	Katherine Nightingale
Cootamundra Bulldogs	10 – 48	Queanbeyan United Blues	Saturday, 30 April, 1:15pm	Les Boyd Oval	Mario Prpic

==== Round 2 ====
Home	Score	Away	Match Information
Home	Score	Away	Date and Time	Venue	Referee
Queanbeyan United Blues	28 – 16	Crookwell Green Devils	Saturday, 7 May, 10:45am	Seiffert Oval	Katherine Nightingale
Woden Valley Rams	40 – 0	Tuggeranong Bushrangers	Saturday, 7 May, 10:50am	Phillip Oval	Jason Severs
Belconnen United Sharks	20 – 16	Gungahlin Bulls	Saturday, 7 May, 12:10pm	NSWRL HQ Bruce	Michael Bayley
Cootamundra Bulldogs	12 – 48	Goulburn City Bulldogs	Saturday, 7 May, 1:15pm	Les Boyd Oval	Mario Prpic

==== Round 3 ====
Home	Score	Away	Match Information
Home	Score	Away	Date and Time	Venue	Referee
Gungahlin Bulls	12 – 28	Queanbeyan United Blues	Saturday, 21 May, 9:30am	NSWRL HQ Bruce	Andrew O'Brien
Tuggeranong Bushrangers	38 – 12	Cootamundra Bulldogs	Saturday, 21 May, 12:00pm	Greenway Oval	Jason Severs
Goulburn City Bulldogs	14 – 12	Woden Valley Rams	Saturday, 21 May, 12:00pm	Workers Arena	Mario Prpic
Belconnen United Sharks	34 – 16	Crookwell Green Devils	Saturday, 21 May, 12:10pm	NSWRL HQ Bruce	Geordie Doherty

==== Round 4 ====
Home	Score	Away	Match Information
Home	Score	Away	Date and Time	Venue	Referee
Queanbeyan United Blues	20 – 18	Goulburn City Bulldogs	Saturday, 28 May, 10:45am	Seiffert Oval	Jason Severs
Woden Valley Rams	24 – 30	Belconnen United Sharks	Saturday, 28 May, 10:50am	Phillip Oval	James Gould
Gungahlin Bulls	58 – 0	Cootamundra Bulldogs	Saturday, 28 May, 11:45am	Gungahlin Enclosed Oval	Katherine Nightingale
Crookwell Green Devils	18 – 4	Tuggeranong Bushrangers	Sunday, 29 May, 1:20pm	Crookwell Memorial Oval	Liam Richardson

==== Round 5 ====
Home	Score	Away	Match Information
Home	Score	Away	Date and Time	Venue	Referee
Woden Valley Rams	12 – 18	Gungahlin Bulls	Sunday, 5 June, 10:50am	Phillip Oval	Katherine Nightingale
Belconnen United Sharks	22 – 18	Queanbeyan United Blues	Sunday, 5 June, 11:00am	NSWRL HQ Bruce	Nathan Gauci
Crookwell Green Devils	30 – 0	Cootamundra Bulldogs	Sunday, 5 June, 12:00pm	Crookwell Memorial Oval	Luke Snowie
Goulburn City Bulldogs	24 – 12	Tuggeranong Bushrangers	Sunday, 5 June, 12:00pm	Workers Arena	Michael Bayley

==== Round 6 ====
Home	Score	Away	Match Information
Home	Score	Away	Date and Time	Venue	Referee
Tuggeranong Bushrangers	10 – 16	Gungahlin Bulls	Saturday, 18 June, 12:00pm	Greenway Oval	Jason Severs
Belconnen United Sharks	56 – 12	Cootamundra Bulldogs	Saturday, 18 June, 12:00pm	Mick Sherd Oval	Geordie Doherty
Woden Valley Rams	14 – 24	Queanbeyan United Blues	Sunday, 19 June, 10:30am	Raiders Belconnen	James Gould
Crookwell Green Devils	0 – 26	Goulburn City Bulldogs	Sunday, 19 June, 1:30pm	Crookwell Memorial Oval	Jack Black

==== Round 7 ====
Home	Score	Away	Match Information
Home	Score	Away	Date and Time	Venue	Referee
Queanbeyan United Blues	40 – 28	Woden Valley Rams	Saturday, 25 June, 9:30am	Seiffert Oval	Nathan Gauci
Crookwell Green Devils	12 – 28	Gungahlin Bulls	Saturday, 25 June, 12:00pm	Crookwell Memorial Oval	Mario Prpic
Cootamundra Bulldogs	0 – 52	Tuggeranong Bushrangers	Saturday, 25 June, 1:15pm	Les Boyd Oval	Liam Richardson
Goulburn City Bulldogs	20 – 14	Belconnen United Sharks	Sunday, 26 June, 12:00pm	Workers Arena	James Gould

==== Round 8 ====
Home	Score	Away	Match Information
Home	Score	Away	Date and Time	Venue	Referee
Crookwell Green Devils	6 – 32	Belconnen United Sharks	Saturday, 2 July, 10:45am	Seears Workwear Oval	Gage Miles
Woden Valley Rams	66 – 6	Cootamundra Bulldogs	Saturday, 2 July, 12:00pm	Phillip Oval	James Gould
Tuggeranong Bushrangers	10 – 22	Queanbeyan United Blues	Saturday, 2 July, 12:00pm	Greenway Oval	Jason Severs
Gungahlin Bulls	18 – 12	Goulburn City Bulldogs	Saturday, 2 July, 12:00pm	Gungahlin Enclosed Oval	Michael Bayley

==== Round 9 ====
Home	Score	Away	Match Information
Home	Score	Away	Date and Time	Venue	Referee
Gungahlin Bulls	4 – 10	Woden Valley Rams	Saturday, 9 July, 12:00pm	Gungahlin Enclosed Oval	Michael Bayley
Belconnen United Sharks	16 – 24	Tuggeranong Bushrangers	Saturday, 9 July, 12:10pm	NSWRL HQ Bruce	Katherine Nightingale
Crookwell Green Devils	10 – 42	Queanbeyan United Blues	Sunday, 10 July, 12:00pm	Crookwell Memorial Oval	Andrew Wheeler
Goulburn City Bulldogs	42* – 0	Cootamundra Bulldogs	Sunday, 10 July, 12:00pm	Workers Arena	N/A

==== Round 10 ====
Home	Score	Away	Match Information
Home	Score	Away	Date and Time	Venue	Referee
Queanbeyan United Blues	16 – 4	Gungahlin Bulls	Saturday, 16 July, 10:45am	Seiffert Oval	Katherine Nightingale
Crookwell Green Devils	0 – 18*	Goulburn City Bulldogs	Saturday, 16 July, 11:45am	Walker Park	N/A
Tuggeranong Bushrangers	14 – 32	Woden Valley Rams	Saturday, 16 July, 12:00pm	Greenway Oval	Michael Bayley
Belconnen United Sharks	76 – 6	Cootamundra Bulldogs	Saturday, 16 July, 12:10pm	NSWRL HQ Bruce	Geordie Doherty

==== Round 11 ====
Home	Score	Away	Match Information
Home	Score	Away	Date and Time	Venue	Referee
Cootamundra Bulldogs	10 – 68	Queanbeyan United Blues	Saturday, 23 July, 10:30am	Seears Workwear Oval	Mario Prpic
Tuggeranong Bushrangers	6 – 30	Goulburn City Bulldogs	Saturday, 23 July, 12:00pm	Greenway Oval	Geordie Doherty
Gungahlin Bulls	34 – 16	Belconnen United Sharks	Saturday, 23 July, 12:00pm	Gungahlin Enclosed Oval	Jack Black
Crookwell Green Devils	24 – 42	Woden Valley Rams	Sunday, 24 July, 12:20pm	Crookwell Memorial Oval	James Gould

==== Round 12 ====
Home	Score	Away	Match Information
Home	Score	Away	Date and Time	Venue	Referee
Woden Valley Rams	14 – 28	Goulburn City Bulldogs	Saturday, 30 July, 10:50am	Phillip Oval	Daniel Wheeler
Queanbeyan United Blues	22 – 24	Belconnen United Sharks	Saturday, 30 July, 12:00pm	Seiffert Oval	Michael Bayley
Cootamundra Bulldogs	12 – 40	Gungahlin Bulls	Saturday, 30 July, 1:15pm	Les Boyd Oval	Mario Prpic
Crookwell Green Devils	22 – 18	Tuggeranong Bushrangers	Sunday, 31 July, 1:30pm	Gunning Showground	Mario Prpic

==== Round 13 ====
Home	Score	Away	Match Information
Home	Score	Away	Date and Time	Venue	Referee
Gungahlin Bulls	V	Crookwell Green Devils	Cancelled	NSWRL HQ Bruce	TBA
Woden Valley Rams	V	Cootamundra Bulldogs	Cancelled	NSWRL HQ Bruce	TBA
Queanbeyan United Blues	V	Tuggeranong Bushrangers	Cancelled	NSWRL HQ Bruce	TBA
Belconnen United Sharks	V	Goulburn City Bulldogs	Cancelled	NSWRL HQ Bruce	TBA

==== Round 14 ====
Home	Score	Away	Match Information
Home	Score	Away	Date and Time	Venue	Referee
Cootamundra Bulldogs	6 – 26	Crookwell Green Devils	Saturday, 13 August, 11:45am	Crookwell Memorial Oval	Michael Bayley
Tuggeranong Bushrangers	10 – 28	Gungahlin Bulls	Saturday, 13 August, 12:00pm	Seears Workwear Oval	Mario Prpic
Goulburn City Bulldogs	16 – 22	Queanbeyan United Blues	Saturday, 13 August, 12:00pm	Workers Arena	Jack Black
Belconnen United Sharks	20 – 24	Woden Valley Rams	Saturday, 13 August, 12:10pm	NSWRL HQ Bruce	Daniel Wheeler

=== Division 1 Finals Series ===
Minor & Major Semi-Finals
1	Queanbeyan United	22
2	Goulburn City	0
3	Belconnen United	16
4	Gungahlin	42

Preliminary Final
2	Goulburn City	10
4	Gungahlin	18

Grand Final
1	Queanbeyan United
4	Gungahlin

Home	Score	Away	Match Information
Home	Score	Away	Date and Time	Venue	Referee
Minor & Major Semi-Finals
Belconnen United Sharks	16 – 42	Gungahlin Bulls	Saturday, 3 September, 10:40am	Greenway Oval	Gage Miles
Queanbeyan United Blues	22 – 0	Goulburn City Bulldogs	Sunday, 4 September, 10:40am	Raiders Belconnen	Tristan Brooker
Preliminary Final
Goulburn City Bulldogs	10 – 18	Gungahlin Bulls	Sunday, 11 September, 10:40am	Gungahlin Enclosed Oval	Gage Miles
Grand Final
Queanbeyan United Blues	V	Gungahlin Bulls	Sunday, 18 September, 10:40am	Seiffert Oval	Gage Miles

=== Grand Final ===
Sunday, 18 September
10:40am

Queanbeyan United Blues	v	Gungahlin Bulls

Seiffert Oval, Queanbeyan
Referee: Gage Miles

Team lists:

FB	1
WG	2
CE	3
CE	4
WG	5
FE	6
HB	7
PR	8
HK	9
PR	10
SR	11
SR	12
LK	13
Substitutes:
IC	14
IC	15
IC	16
IC	17
IC	18
IC	19
IC	20
IC	21
IC	22
Coach:

Officials:

Gage Miles (Referee)

Tristan Brooker (Touch Judge)

Daniel Wheeler (Touch Judge)

FB	1
WG	2
CE	3
CE	4
WG	5
FE	6
HB	7
PR	8
HK	9
PR	10
SR	11
SR	12
LK	13
Substitutes:
IC	14
IC	15
IC	16
IC	18
IC	19
IC	20
IC	22
IC	23
Coach:

=== Division 2 Finals Series ===
Minor & Major Semi-Finals
5	Woden Valley	28
6	Crookwell	0
7	Tuggeranong	32
8	Cootamundra	8

Preliminary Final
6	Crookwell	12
7	Tuggeranong	16

Grand Final
5	Woden Valley	34
7	Tuggeranong	14

Home	Score	Away	Match Information
Home	Score	Away	Date and Time	Venue	Referee
Minor & Major Semi-Finals
Woden Valley Rams	28 – 0	Crookwell Green Devils	Saturday, 20 August, 12:20pm	Mick Sherd Oval	Michael Bayley
Tuggeranong Bushrangers	32 – 8	Cootamundra Bulldogs	Saturday, 20 August, 1:50pm	Les Boyd Oval	Jack Black
Preliminary Final
Crookwell Green Devils	12 – 16	Tuggeranong Bushrangers	Saturday, 27 August, 10:40am	Crookwell Memorial Oval	Jack Black
Grand Final
Woden Valley Rams	34 – 14	Tuggeranong Bushrangers	Saturday, 3 September, 10:30am	Mick Sherd Oval	Jack Black

=== Grand Final ===
Saturday, 3 September
10:30am

Woden Valley Rams	34 – 14	Tuggeranong Bushrangers
Tries: Harley Young (8', 21') 2 Ethan Lawrence (1') 1 Samuel Gash (32') 1 Joshua Jenkins (52') 1 Paula Monta (55') 1 Goals: Samuel Gash 5/6 (10', 22', 33', 53', 57')	1st: 16 – 6; 2nd: 18 – 8	Tries: 2 (25', 37') Tyler Evans; 1 (35') James Andrew; Goals: 1/3 Eamonn Kennedy (26')

Mick Sherd Oval, Bungendore
Referee: Jack Black

Team lists:

FB	1	Samuel Gash
WG	2	Ethan Lawrence
CE	3	Clay Wheeler
CE	4	Charlie Wykes
WG	5	James Smith
FE	6	Joshua Jenkins
HB	7	Harry Lyons
PR	8	Harley Young
HK	9	Cambell Willey
PR	10	Paula Monta
SR	11	William Hill
SR	12	Benjamin McSpadden
LK	13	Samuel Cooper
Substitutes:
IC	14	Kaya Irfan
IC	15	Riley Searl
IC	16	Riley Serafin
IC	23	Jesse Eljuga
Coach:
Adam Smith

Officials:

Jack Black (Referee)

Mario Prpic (Touch Judge)

Liam Richardson (Touch Judge)

FB	1	Samuel Norris
WG	2	Alby Locus
CE	3	Christopher Hazell
CE	4	Ethan Hall
WG	5	Tyler Evans
FE	6	Samuel Clothier
HB	7	Eamonn Kennedy
PR	8	Mason Uttley
HK	9	Benjamin Drayton
PR	10	Alexander Nanesa
SR	19	James Bell
SR	12	Jason Ayun
LK	13	James Andrew
Substitutes:
IC	25	Nicholas Navarro
IC	18	Nicholas Glover
IC	15	Michael Irvin
IC	14	Thomas Bell
Coach:
Greg Bell

== Canberra Raiders Cup Ladies League Tag ==
=== Teams ===
Colours	Club	Home ground(s)	Head coach
	Belconnen United Sharks	NSWRL HQ Bruce	Mark Hankinson
	Goulburn City Bulldogs	Workers Arena	Vaughan Winnel
	Gungahlin Bulls	Gungahlin Enclosed Oval	Darren Grocott
	Queanbeyan Kangaroos	Seears Workwear Oval	Leslie Abel
	Queanbeyan United Blues	Seiffert Oval	Byce Lee
	Tuggeranong Bushrangers	Greenway Oval	Peter Zasiadczyk
	West Belconnen Warriors	Raiders Belconnen	Adrian Grayson
	Woden Valley Rams	Phillip Oval	Bryce Lloyd

=== Ladder ===
Pos	Team	Pld	W	D	L	B	PF	PA	PD	Pts
1	West Belconnen Warriors LLT	14	12	1	1	4	350	64	+286	33
2	Gungahlin Bulls LLT	14	12	1	1	4	378	96	+282	33
3	Woden Valley Rams LLT	14	10	2	2	4	444	72	+372	30
4	Belconnen United Sharks LLT	14	7	0	7	4	214	110	+104	22
5	Goulburn City Bulldogs LLT	14	7	0	7	4	178	222	−44	22
6	Queanbeyan United Blues LLT	14	3	1	10	4	110	354	−244	15
7	Queanbeyan Kangaroos LLT	14	1	1	12	4	56	418	−362	11
8	Tuggeranong Bushrangers LLT	14	0	2	12	4	60	454	−394	10

Updated to match(es) played on 27 August. Source:
Rules for classification: 1) points; 2) point difference; 3) points scored

==== Ladder progression ====
- Numbers highlighted in green indicate that the team finished the round inside the top 4.
- Numbers highlighted in blue indicates the team finished first on the ladder in that round.
- Numbers highlighted in red indicates the team finished last place on the ladder in that round.
- Underlined numbers indicate that the team had a bye during that round.

Pos	Team	1	2	3	4	5	6	7	8	9	10	11	12	13	14	15	16	17	18
1	West Belconnen Warriors LLT	0	2	4	6	8	10	12	14	16	18	20	22	24	25	27	29	31	33
2	Gungahlin Bulls LLT	2	4	6	8	10	12	14	16	18	18	20	22	24	26	28	30	31	33
3	Woden Valley Rams LLT	2	4	6	8	8	10	12	12	14	16	18	20	22	23	25	27	28	30
4	Belconnen United Sharks LLT	2	4	4	6	6	8	8	10	12	12	14	16	16	16	18	18	20	22
5	Goulburn City Bulldogs LLT	0	0	2	2	4	4	6	8	10	12	12	12	14	16	16	18	20	22
6	Queanbeyan United Blues LLT	0	2	2	4	6	6	6	8	8	8	9	11	11	13	13	13	15	15
7	Queanbeyan Kangaroos LLT	2	2	4	4	4	6	6	6	6	7	7	7	9	9	11	11	11	11
8	Tuggeranong Bushrangers LLT	0	0	0	0	2	2	4	4	4	5	6	6	6	8	8	10	10	10

=== Season results ===
==== Round 1 ====
Home	Score	Away	Match Information
Home	Score	Away	Date and Time	Venue	Referee
Tuggeranong Bushrangers	0 – 8	Queanbeyan Kangaroos	Saturday, 2 April, 12:00pm	Greenway Oval	Christopher Nightingale
Gungahlin Bulls	16 – 12	West Belconnen Warriors	Saturday, 2 April, 12:00pm	Gungahlin Enclosed Oval	Atticus Batten
Belconnen United Sharks	26 – 4	Goulburn City Bulldogs	Saturday, 2 April, 12:00pm	NSWRL HQ Bruce	William Perrott
Woden Valley Rams	30 – 6	Queanbeyan United Blues	Saturday, 2 April, 12:00pm	Phillip Oval	Sean Ehlers

==== Round 2 ====
Home	Score	Away	Match Information
Home	Score	Away	Date and Time	Venue	Referee
Goulburn City Bulldogs	4 – 28	Gungahlin Bulls	Saturday, 9 April, 12:00pm	Workers Arena	William Perrott
Queanbeyan United Blues	20 – 14	Tuggeranong Bushrangers	Saturday, 9 April, 12:00pm	Seiffert Oval	Atticus Batten
Belconnen United Sharks	34 – 0	Queanbeyan Kangaroos	Saturday, 9 April, 12:00pm	NSWRL HQ Bruce	Jessica Charman
Woden Valley Rams	BYE	West Belconnen Warriors

==== Round 3 ====
Home	Score	Away	Match Information
Home	Score	Away	Date and Time	Venue	Referee
Gungahlin Bulls	22 – 0	Queanbeyan United Blues	Saturday, 23 April, 12:00pm	Gungahlin Enclosed Oval	Heather Hall
Woden Valley Rams	62 – 0	Tuggeranong Bushrangers	Saturday, 23 April, 12:00pm	Phillip Oval	William Perrott
West Belconnen Warriors	10 – 6	Belconnen United Sharks	Sunday, 24 April, 2:00pm	Raiders Belconnen	Atticus Batten
Goulburn City Bulldogs	BYE	Queanbeyan Kangaroos

==== Round 4 ====
Home	Score	Away	Match Information
Home	Score	Away	Date and Time	Venue	Referee
Tuggeranong Bushrangers	4 – 24	Belconnen United Sharks	Saturday, 30 April, 9:30am	Greenway Oval	Christopher Nightingale
West Belconnen Warriors	38 – 6	Goulburn City Bulldogs	Saturday, 30 April, 12:00pm	Raiders Belconnen	Thomas Rynehart
Queanbeyan Kangaroos	0 – 46	Woden Valley Rams	Saturday, 30 April, 12:00pm	Seears Workwear Oval	William Perrott
Gungahlin Bulls	BYE	Queanbeyan United Blues

==== Round 5 ====
Home	Score	Away	Match Information
Home	Score	Away	Date and Time	Venue	Referee
Queanbeyan United Blues	18 – 10	Queanbeyan Kangaroos	Saturday, 7 May, 10:45am	Seiffert Oval	Thomas Rynehart
Belconnen United Sharks	6 – 10	Gungahlin Bulls	Saturday, 7 May, 10:50am	NSWRL HQ Bruce	Michael Lean
Woden Valley Rams	8 – 14	West Belconnen Warriors	Saturday, 7 May, 12:00pm	Phillip Oval	William Perrott
Tuggeranong Bushrangers	BYE	Goulburn City Bulldogs

==== Round 6 ====
Home	Score	Away	Match Information
Home	Score	Away	Date and Time	Venue	Referee
Tuggeranong Bushrangers	0 – 42	West Belconnen Warriors	Saturday, 21 May, 9:30am	Greenway Oval	William Perrott
Goulburn City Bulldogs	6 – 18	Woden Valley Rams	Saturday, 21 May, 9:30am	Workers Arena	Michael Lean
Belconnen United Sharks	24 – 4	Queanbeyan United Blues	Saturday, 21 May, 10:50am	NSWRL HQ Bruce	Thomas Rynehart
Queanbeyan Kangaroos	BYE	Gungahlin Bulls

==== Round 7 ====
Home	Score	Away	Match Information
Home	Score	Away	Date and Time	Venue	Referee
Gungahlin Bulls	34 – 0	Queanbeyan Kangaroos	Saturday, 28 May, 10:40am	Gungahlin Enclosed Oval	Thomas Rynehart
Queanbeyan United Blues	4 – 14	Goulburn City Bulldogs	Saturday, 28 May, 10:45am	Seiffert Oval	Heather Hall
Woden Valley Rams	18 – 0	Belconnen United Sharks	Saturday, 28 May, 12:00pm	Phillip Oval	William Perrott
West Belconnen Warriors	BYE	Tuggeranong Bushrangers

==== Round 8 ====
Home	Score	Away	Match Information
Home	Score	Away	Date and Time	Venue	Referee
West Belconnen Warriors	28 – 8	Queanbeyan Kangaroos	Saturday, 4 June, 12:00pm	Raiders Belconnen	Thomas Rynehart
Goulburn City Bulldogs	34 – 8	Tuggeranong Bushrangers	Sunday, 5 June, 9:30am	Workers Arena	Mario Prpic
Woden Valley Rams	10 – 14	Gungahlin Bulls	Sunday, 5 June, 12:00pm	Phillip Oval	William Perrott
Queanbeyan United Blues	BYE	Belconnen United Sharks

==== Round 9 ====
Home	Score	Away	Match Information
Home	Score	Away	Date and Time	Venue	Referee
Tuggeranong Bushrangers	4 – 48	Gungahlin Bulls	Saturday, 18 June, 9:30am	Greenway Oval	Thomas Rynehart
Queanbeyan Kangaroos	4 – 12	Goulburn City Bulldogs	Saturday, 18 June, 12:00pm	Seears Workwear Oval	William Perrott
West Belconnen Warriors	32 – 0	Queanbeyan United Blues	Sunday, 19 June, 12:00pm	Raiders Belconnen	Thomas Rynehart
Belconnen United Sharks	BYE	Woden Valley Rams

==== Round 10 ====
Home	Score	Away	Match Information
Home	Score	Away	Date and Time	Venue	Referee
Queanbeyan United Blues	0 – 50	Woden Valley Rams	Saturday, 25 June, 10:45am	Seiffert Oval	Christopher Nightingale
West Belconnen Warriors	26 – 0	Gungahlin Bulls	Saturday, 25 June, 12:00pm	Raiders Belconnen	Jason Severs
Queanbeyan Kangaroos	12 – 12	Tuggeranong Bushrangers	Saturday, 25 June, 12:00pm	Seears Workwear Oval	William Perrott
Goulburn City Bulldogs	8 – 4	Belconnen United Sharks	Sunday, 26 June, 9:30am	Workers Arena	Heather Hall

==== Round 11 ====
Home	Score	Away	Match Information
Home	Score	Away	Date and Time	Venue	Referee
Tuggeranong Bushrangers	8 – 8	Queanbeyan United Blues	Saturday, 2 July, 9:30am	Greenway Oval	William Perrott
Gungahlin Bulls	34 – 12	Goulburn City Bulldogs	Saturday, 2 July, 10:40am	Gungahlin Enclosed Oval	Jack Black
Queanbeyan Kangaroos	4 – 12	Belconnen United Sharks	Saturday, 2 July, 12:00pm	Seears Workwear Oval	Atticus Batten
Woden Valley Rams	BYE	West Belconnen Warriors

==== Round 12 ====
Home	Score	Away	Match Information
Home	Score	Away	Date and Time	Venue	Referee
Belconnen United Sharks	32 – 4	Tuggeranong Bushrangers	Saturday, 9 July, 10:50am	NSWRL HQ Bruce	Thomas Rynehart
Woden Valley Rams	56 – 0	Queanbeyan Kangaroos	Saturday, 9 July, 12:00pm	Phillip Oval	Atticus Batten
Goulburn City Bulldogs	4 – 10	West Belconnen Warriors	Sunday, 10 July, 9:30am	Workers Arena	William Perrott
Queanbeyan United Blues	BYE	Gungahlin Bulls

==== Round 13 ====
Home	Score	Away	Match Information
Home	Score	Away	Date and Time	Venue	Referee
Tuggeranong Bushrangers	0 – 72	Woden Valley Rams	Saturday, 16 July, 9:30am	Greenway Oval	William Perrott
Belconnen United Sharks	0 – 2	West Belconnen Warriors	Saturday, 16 July, 10:50am	NSWRL HQ Bruce	Thomas Rynehart
Queanbeyan United Blues	8 – 42	Gungahlin Bulls	Saturday, 16 July, 12:00pm	Seiffert Oval	Michael Lean
Goulburn City Bulldogs	BYE	Queanbeyan Kangaroos

==== Round 14 ====
Home	Score	Away	Match Information
Home	Score	Away	Date and Time	Venue	Referee
Gungahlin Bulls	18 – 8	Belconnen United Sharks	Saturday, 23 July, 10:40am	Gungahlin Enclosed Oval	William Perrott
Queanbeyan Kangaroos	6 – 32	Queanbeyan United Blues	Saturday, 23 July, 12:00pm	Seears Workwear Oval	Jessica Charman
West Belconnen Warriors	10 – 10	Woden Valley Rams	Sunday, 24 July, 12:00pm	Raiders Belconnen	Heather Hall
Tuggeranong Bushrangers	BYE	Goulburn City Bulldogs

==== Round 15 ====
Home	Score	Away	Match Information
Home	Score	Away	Date and Time	Venue	Referee
Queanbeyan United Blues	10 – 32	Belconnen United Sharks	Saturday, 30 July, 10:45am	Seiffert Oval	Atticus Batten
Woden Valley Rams	44 – 10	Goulburn City Bulldogs	Saturday, 30 July, 12:00pm	Phillip Oval	Thomas Rynehart
West Belconnen Warriors	22 – 6	Tuggeranong Bushrangers	Sunday, 31 July, 12:00pm	Raiders Belconnen	Michael Lean
Queanbeyan Kangaroos	BYE	Gungahlin Bulls

==== Round 16 ====
Home	Score	Away	Match Information
Home	Score	Away	Date and Time	Venue	Referee
Belconnen United Sharks	6 – 14	Woden Valley Rams	Saturday, 13 August, 10:50am	NSWRL HQ Bruce	Thomas Rynehart
Goulburn City Bulldogs	16 – 0	Queanbeyan United Blues	Saturday, 13 August, 9:30am	Workers Arena	Christopher Nightingale
Queanbeyan Kangaroos	0 – 52	Gungahlin Bulls	Saturday, 13 August, 12:00pm	Seears Workwear Oval	Atticus Batten
West Belconnen Warriors	BYE	Tuggeranong Bushrangers

==== Round 17 ====
Home	Score	Away	Match Information
Home	Score	Away	Date and Time	Venue	Referee
Tuggeranong Bushrangers	0 – 16	Goulburn City Bulldogs	Saturday, 20 August, 12:00pm	Greenway Oval	Christopher Nightingale
Queanbeyan Kangaroos	0 – 50	West Belconnen Warriors	Saturday, 20 August, 12:00pm	Seears Workwear Oval	Geordie Doherty
Gungahlin Bulls	6 – 6	Woden Valley Rams	Sunday, 21 August, 12:00pm	Gungahlin Enclosed Oval	William Perrott
Queanbeyan United Blues	BYE	Belconnen United Sharks

==== Round 18 ====
Home	Score	Away	Match Information
Home	Score	Away	Date and Time	Venue	Referee
Goulburn City Bulldogs	32 – 4	Queanbeyan Kangaroos	Saturday, 27 August, 9:30am	Workers Arena	Mario Prpic
Gungahlin Bulls	54 – 0	Tuggeranong Bushrangers	Saturday, 27 August, 10:40am	Gungahlin Enclosed Oval	Thomas Rynehart
Queanbeyan United Blues	0 – 54	West Belconnen Warriors	Saturday, 27 August, 10:45am	Seiffert Oval	William Perrott
Belconnen United Sharks	BYE	Woden Valley Rams

=== Finals Series ===
Minor & Major Semi-Finals
1	West Belconnen	14
2	Gungahlin	10
3	Woden Valley	26
4	Belconnen United	6

Preliminary Final
2	Gungahlin	4
3	Woden Valley	14

Grand Final
1	West Belconnen
3	Woden Valley

Home	Score	Away	Match Information
Home	Score	Away	Date and Time	Venue	Referee
Minor & Major Semi-Finals
Woden Valley Rams	26 – 6	Belconnen United Sharks	Saturday, 3 September, 9:30am	Greenway Oval	William Perrott
West Belconnen Warriors	14 – 10	Gungahlin Bulls	Sunday, 4 September, 9:30am	Raiders Belconnen	Atticus Batten
Preliminary Final
Gungahlin Bulls	4 – 14	Woden Valley Rams	Sunday, 11 September, 9:30am	Gungahlin Enclosed Oval	William Perrott
Grand Final
West Belconnen Warriors	V	Woden Valley Rams	Sunday, 18 September, 9:15am	Seiffert Oval	William Perrott

=== Grand Final ===
Sunday, 18 September
9:15am

West Belconnen Warriors	v	Woden Valley Rams

Seiffert Oval, Queanbeyan
Referee: William Perrott

Team lists:

FB	1
WG	2
CE	3
CE	4
WG	5
FE	6
HB	7
PR	8
HK	9
PR	10
SR	11
SR	12
LK	13
Substitutes:
IC	14
IC	15
IC	16
IC	17
IC	18
IC	19
IC	20
IC	21
IC	22
Coach:

Officials:

William Perrott (Referee)

Ashley Hayek-Kuchel (Touch Judge)

Michael Lean (Touch Judge)

FB	1
WG	2
CE	3
CE	4
WG	5
FE	6
HB	7
PR	8
HK	9
PR	10
SR	11
SR	12
LK	13
Substitutes:
IC	14
IC	15
IC	16
IC	18
IC	19
IC	20
IC	22
IC	23
Coach:

== Second Division Ladies League Tag ==
=== Teams ===
Colours	Club	Home ground(s)	Head coach
	Binalong Jersey Girls	Binalong Recreation Ground	Marnie Pack
	Boorowa Roverettes	Boorowa Showground	Byron Campbell
	Bungendore Tigerettes	Mick Sherd Oval	Jack Bramley
	Cootamundra Bullettes	Les Boyd Oval	John Murray
	Crookwell She Devils	Crookwell Memorial Oval	Christopher Chudleigh
	Gunning Rooettes	Gunning Showground	Thomas Johnson
	Harden Hawkettes	McLean Oval	Jason Pollard
	North Canberra Bears	Kaleen Enclosed Oval	Hayley Kemp
	University of Canberra Stars	Raiders Belconnen	Dylan Barton

=== Ladder ===
Pos	Team	Pld	W	D	L	B	PF	PA	PS	W%
1	Harden Hawkettes	13	13	0	0	1	602	12	98.0	100.0
2	Boorowa Roverettes	13	10	0	3	1	302	118	71.9	76.9
3	North Canberra Bears LLT	12	8	0	4	2	222	144	60.6	66.6
4	Bungendore Tigerettes	12	8	0	4	2	246	256	49.0	66.6
5	Cootamundra Bullettes	12	7	0	5	2	288	198	59.2	58.3
6	Crookwell She Devils	12	5	0	7	2	182	260	41.1	41.6
7	Binalong Jersey Girls	13	3	0	10	1	58	416	12.2	23.0
8	University of Canberra Stars LLT	12	2	0	10	2	74	272	21.3	16.6
9	Gunning Rooettes	13	0	0	13	1	68	366	15.6	0.0

Updated to match(es) played on 31 July. Source:
Rules for classification: 1) win percentage; 2) percentage of scoring; 3) points scored

==== Ladder Progression ====
- Numbers highlighted in green indicate that the team finished the round inside the top 5.
- Numbers highlighted in blue indicates the team finished first on the ladder in that round.
- Numbers highlighted in red indicates the team finished last place on the ladder in that round.
- Underlined numbers indicate that the team had a bye during that round.

Pos	Team	1	2	3	4	5	6	7	8	9	10	11	12	13	14	15
1	Harden Hawkettes	100.0	100.0	100.0	100.0	100.0	100.0	100.0	100.0	100.0	100.0	100.0	100.0	100.0	100.0	100.0
2	Boorowa Roverettes	100.0	50.0	50.0	66.6	75.0	80.0	83.3	85.7	87.5	88.8	80.0	81.8	75.0	76.9	76.9
3	North Canberra Bears LLT	100.0	100.0	100.0	100.0	80.0	83.3	85.7	75.0	75.0	77.7	70.0	70.0	72.7	66.6	66.6
4	Bungendore Tigerettes	100.0	50.0	33.3	33.3	50.0	60.0	50.0	57.1	62.5	55.5	60.0	63.6	66.6	66.6	66.6
5	Cootamundra Bullettes	0.0	100.0	100.0	100.0	75.0	60.0	50.0	57.1	50.0	55.5	55.5	50.0	54.5	58.3	58.3
6	Crookwell She Devils	0.0	50.0	33.3	25.0	40.0	33.3	33.3	28.5	37.5	33.3	40.0	36.3	36.3	41.6	41.6
7	Binalong Jersey Girls	0.0	0.0	0.0	0.0	0.0	0.0	16.6	28.5	25.0	22.2	30.0	27.2	25.0	23.0	23.0
8	University of Canberra Stars LLT	0.0	0.0	33.3	25.0	25.0	20.0	16.6	14.2	12.5	12.5	11.1	20.0	18.1	16.6	16.6
9	Gunning Rooettes	0.0	0.0	0.0	0.0	0.0	0.0	0.0	0.0	0.0	0.0	0.0	0.0	0.0	0.0	0.0

=== Season Results ===
==== Round 1 ====
Home	Score	Away	Match Information
Home	Score	Away	Date and Time	Venue	Referee
Binalong Jersey Girls	4 – 40	North Canberra Bears	Saturday, 2 April, 1:00pm	Binalong Recreation Oval	Jack Black
University of Canberra Stars	0 – 46	Harden Hawkettes	Saturday, 2 April, 1:15pm	Raiders Belconnen	Michael Lean
Boorowa Roverettes	58 – 0	Gunning Rooettes	Saturday, 2 April, 1:15pm	Boorowa Showground	Noah Dal Molin
Bungendore Tigerettes	16 – 0	Crookwell She Devils	Saturday, 2 April, 1:20pm	Mick Sherd Oval	Andrew O'Brien
Cootamundra Bullettes		BYE

==== Round 2 ====
Home	Score	Away	Match Information
Home	Score	Away	Date and Time	Venue	Referee
Crookwell She Devils	20 – 12	University of Canberra Stars	Saturday, 9 April, 12:15pm	Crookwell Memorial Oval	Mario Prpic
Gunning Rooettes	0 – 36	Cootamundra Bullettes	Saturday, 9 April, 12:30pm	Gunning Showground	Andrew O'Brien
North Canberra Bears	40 – 18	Bungendore Tigerettes	Saturday, 9 April, 1:15pm	Kaleen Enclosed Oval	Michael Lean
Harden Hawkettes	26 – 0	Boorowa Roverettes	Saturday, 9 April, 1:50pm	McLean Oval	Tristan Brooker
Binalong Jersey Girls		BYE

==== Round 3 ====
Home	Score	Away	Match Information
Home	Score	Away	Date and Time	Venue	Referee
Binalong Jersey Girls	0 – 42	Cootamundra Bullettes	Saturday, 23 April, 1:00pm	Binalong Recreation Oval	Michael Bayley
Bungendore Tigerettes	4 – 36	Harden Hawkettes	Saturday, 23 April, 1:20pm	Mick Sherd Oval	Jessica Charman
University of Canberra Stars	16 – 10	Gunning Rooettes	Saturday, 23 April, 3:00pm	Raiders Belconnen	Thomas Rynehart
Crookwell She Devils	10 – 20	North Canberra Bears	Sunday, 24 April, 1:20pm	Crookwell Memorial Oval	Andrew O'Brien
Boorowa Roverettes		BYE

==== Round 4 ====
Home	Score	Away	Match Information
Home	Score	Away	Date and Time	Venue	Referee
Boorowa Roverettes	36 – 0	Binalong Jersey Girls	Friday, 29 April, 7:00pm	Boorowa Showground	James Gould
Cootamundra Bullettes	28 – 12	University of Canberra Stars	Saturday, 30 April, 12:00pm	Les Boyd Oval	Mario Prpic
Gunning Rooettes	0 – 16	North Canberra Bears	Saturday, 30 April, 12:30pm	Gunning Showground	Michael Lean
Harden Hawkettes	54 – 4	Crookwell She Devils	Saturday, 30 April, 1:50pm	McLean Oval	Jessica Charman
Bungendore Tigerettes		BYE

==== Round 5 ====
Home	Score	Away	Match Information
Home	Score	Away	Date and Time	Venue	Referee
Cootamundra Bullettes	12 – 22	Boorowa Roverettes	Saturday, 7 May, 12:00pm	Les Boyd Oval	Mario Prpic
North Canberra Bears	0 – 30	Harden Hawkettes	Saturday, 7 May, 1:15pm	Kaleen Enclosed Oval	Geordie Doherty
Bungendore Tigerettes	28 – 8	Gunning Rooettes	Saturday, 7 May, 1:20pm	Mick Sherd Oval	Christopher Nightingale
Crookwell She Devils	36 – 12	Binalong Jersey Girls	Saturday, 7 May, 1:20pm	Crookwell Memorial Oval	Luke Snowie
University of Canberra Stars		BYE

==== Round 6 ====
Home	Score	Away	Match Information
Home	Score	Away	Date and Time	Venue	Referee
Binalong Jersey Girls	0 – 48	Bungendore Tigerettes	Saturday, 21 May, 1:00pm	Binalong Recreation Oval	Tristan Brooker
North Canberra Bears	16 – 10	University of Canberra Stars	Saturday, 21 May, 1:15pm	Kaleen Enclosed Oval	Christopher Nightingale
Boorowa Roverettes	32 – 12	Crookwell She Devils	Saturday, 21 May, 1:15pm	Boorowa Showground	Nathan Gauci
Harden Hawkettes	44 – 4	Cootamundra Bullettes	Saturday, 21 May, 1:50pm	McLean Oval	Houshyar Fallah
Gunning Rooettes		BYE

==== Round 7 ====
Home	Score	Away	Match Information
Home	Score	Away	Date and Time	Venue	Referee
University of Canberra Stars	4 – 18	Binalong Jersey Girls	Saturday, 28 May, 12:00pm	Raiders Belconnen	Atticus Batten
Cootamundra Bullettes	12 – 22	North Canberra Bears	Saturday, 28 May, 12:00pm	Les Boyd Oval	Andrew Nightingale
Gunning Rooettes	0 – 60	Harden Hawkettes	Saturday, 28 May, 12:30pm	Gunning Showground	Andrew O'Brien
Bungendore Tigerettes	14 – 26	Boorowa Roverettes	Saturday, 28 May, 1:20pm	Mick Sherd Oval	Nathan Gauci
Crookwell She Devils		BYE

==== Round 8 ====
Home	Score	Away	Match Information
Home	Score	Away	Date and Time	Venue	Referee
Gunning Rooettes	8 – 12	Binalong Jersey Girls	Saturday, 4 June, 12:30pm	Gunning Showground	Michael Lean
Bungendore Tigerettes	34 – 8	University of Canberra Stars	Saturday, 4 June, 1:20pm	Mick Sherd Oval	Jack Black
Boorowa Roverettes	16 – 6	North Canberra Bears	Saturday, 4 June, 2:20pm	Boorowa Showground	Elijah Fernance
Crookwell She Devils	22 – 32	Cootamundra Bullettes	Sunday, 5 June, 1:20pm	Crookwell Memorial Oval	Jason Severs
Harden Hawkettes		BYE

==== Round 9 ====
Home	Score	Away	Match Information
Home	Score	Away	Date and Time	Venue	Referee
University of Canberra Stars	4 – 14	Boorowa Roverettes	Saturday, 18 June, 12:00pm	Raiders Belconnen	James Gould
Bungendore Tigerettes	16 – 12	Cootamundra Bullettes	Saturday, 18 June, 1:20pm	Mick Sherd Oval	Christopher Nightingale
Harden Hawkettes	54 – 0	Binalong Jersey Girls	Saturday, 18 June, 1:50pm	McLean Oval	Jessica Charman
Crookwell She Devils	26 – 18	Gunning Rooettes	Sunday, 19 June, 1:20pm	Crookwell Memorial Oval	Jack Black
North Canberra Bears		BYE

==== Round 10 ====
Home	Score	Away	Match Information
Home	Score	Away	Date and Time	Venue	Referee
Cootamundra Bullettes	56 – 0	Gunning Rooettes	Saturday, 25 June, 12:00pm	Les Boyd Oval	Liam Richardson
Binalong Jersey Girls	0 – 52	Boorowa Roverettes	Saturday, 25 June, 1:00pm	Binalong Recreation Oval	Michael Bayley
North Canberra Bears	28 – 4	Crookwell She Devils	Saturday, 25 June, 1:15pm	Kaleen Enclosed Oval	Michael Lean
Harden Hawkettes	80 – 0	Bungendore Tigerettes	Saturday, 25 June, 1:50pm	McLean Oval	Geordie Doherty
University of Canberra Stars		BYE

==== Round 11 ====
Home	Score	Away	Match Information
Home	Score	Away	Date and Time	Venue	Referee
University of Canberra Stars	0 – 8	Crookwell She Devils	Saturday, 2 July, 12:00pm	Raiders Belconnen	Geordie Doherty
Binalong Jersey Girls	12 – 4	Gunning Rooettes	Saturday, 2 July, 1:00pm	Binalong Recreation Oval	Michael Lean
Boorowa Roverettes	0 – 10	Harden Hawkettes	Saturday, 2 July, 1:15pm	Boorowa Showground	Ross Walters
Bungendore Tigerettes	24 – 12	North Canberra Bears	Saturday, 2 July, 1:20pm	Mick Sherd Oval	Christopher Nightingale
Cootamundra Bullettes		BYE

==== Round 12 ====
Home	Score	Away	Match Information
Home	Score	Away	Date and Time	Venue	Referee
Cootamundra Bullettes	0 – 46	Harden Hawkettes	Saturday, 9 July, 12:00pm	Les Boyd Oval	Ross Walters
Gunning Rooettes	4 – 16	Boorowa Roverettes	Saturday, 9 July, 12:30pm	Gunning Showground	Michael Lean
Binalong Jersey Girls	0 – 8	University of Canberra Stars	Saturday, 9 July, 1:00pm	Binalong Recreation Oval	Liam Richardson
Crookwell She Devils	26 – 28	Bungendore Tigerettes	Sunday, 10 July, 1:20pm	Crookwell Memorial Oval	Gage Miles
North Canberra Bears		BYE

==== Round 13 ====
Home	Score	Away	Match Information
Home	Score	Away	Date and Time	Venue	Referee
University of Canberra Stars	0 – 14	North Canberra Bears	Saturday, 23 July, 12:00pm	Raiders Belconnen	Thomas Rynehart
Gunning Rooettes	8 – 16	Bungendore Tigerettes	Saturday, 23 July, 12:30pm	Gunning Showground	Michael Lean
Binalong Jersey Girls	0 – 52	Harden Hawkettes	Saturday, 23 July, 1:00pm	Binalong Recreation Oval	Ross Walters
Boorowa Roverettes	14 – 22	Cootamundra Bullettes	Saturday, 23 July, 1:15pm	Boorowa Showground	Houshyar Fallah
Crookwell She Devils		BYE

==== Round 14 ====
Home	Score	Away	Match Information
Home	Score	Away	Date and Time	Venue	Referee
Cootamundra Bullettes	32 – 0	Binalong Jersey Girls	Saturday, 30 July, 12:00pm	Les Boyd Oval	Mario Prpic
North Canberra Bears	8 – 16	Boorowa Roverettes	Saturday, 30 July, 1:15pm	Kaleen Enclosed Oval	Ross Walters
Harden Hawkettes	64 – 0	University of Canberra Stars	Saturday, 30 July, 1:50pm	McLean Oval	Houshyar Fallah
Gunning Rooettes	8 – 14	Crookwell She Devils	Sunday, 31 July, 12:30pm	Gunning Showground	Mario Prpic
Bungendore Tigerettes		BYE

==== Round 15 ====
Home	Score	Away	Match Information
Home	Score	Away	Date and Time	Venue	Referee
University of Canberra Stars	V	Bungendore Tigerettes	Cancelled	Raiders Belconnen	TBA
North Canberra Bears	V	Cootamundra Bullettes	Cancelled	Kaleen Enclosed Oval	TBA
Harden Hawkettes	V	Gunning Rooettes	Cancelled	McLean Oval	TBA
Crookwell She Devils	V	Boorowa Roverettes	Cancelled	Crookwell Memorial Oval	TBA
Binalong Jersey Girls		BYE

=== Finals Series ===
Qualifying Final
2	Boorowa	12
3	North Canberra	6
4	Bungendore	20
5	Cootamundra	24

Major Semi-Final
1	Harden	27
2	Boorowa	0
Minor Semi-Final
3	North Canberra	0
5	Cootamundra	12

Preliminary Final
2	Boorowa	14
5	Cootamundra	12

Grand Final
1	Harden	28
2	Boorowa	2

Home	Score	Away	Match Information
Home	Score	Away	Date and Time	Venue	Referee
Qualifying & Elimination Finals
Bungendore Tigerettes	20 – 24	Cootamundra Bullettes	Saturday, 13 August, 1:15pm	Crookwell Memorial Oval	William Perrott
Boorowa Roverettes	12 – 6	North Canberra Bears	Saturday, 13 August, 1:15pm	McLean Oval	Ross Walters
Minor & Major Semi-Finals
Harden Hawkettes	27 – 0	Boorowa Roverettes	Saturday, 20 August, 10:50am	Mick Sherd Oval	Thomas Rynehart
North Canberra Bears	0 – 12	Cootamundra Bullettes	Saturday, 20 August, 1:50pm	Les Boyd Oval	William Perrott
Preliminary Final
Boorowa Roverettes	14 – 12	Cootamundra Bullettes	Saturday, 27 August, 1:40pm	Crookwell Memorial Oval	Ross Walters
Grand Final
Harden Hawkettes	28 – 2	Boorowa Roverettes	Saturday, 3 September, 1:30pm	Mick Sherd Oval	Geordie Doherty

=== Grand Final ===
Saturday, 3 September
1:30pm

Harden Hawkettes	28 – 2	Boorowa Roverettes
Tries: Georgia Smith (23', 38') 2 Courtney Barratt (31') 1 Clare Smith (41') 1 Marylouise Minehan (50') 1 Goals: Emma James 4/5 (25', 32', 39', 42')	1st: 6 – 2; 2nd: 22 – 0	Goals: 1/1 Kirsten Hewitt (16' pen)

Mick Sherd Oval, Bungendore
Referee: Geordie Doherty

Team lists:

FB	1	Grace Smith
WG	2	Marylouise Minehan
CE	3	Clare Smith
CE	4	Georgia Smith
WG	15	Erin Boxsell
FE	6	Emma James
HB	5	Abbie Grant
LK	23	Jasmin Chesworth
HK	19	Eliza Butt
SR	9	Kate Menz
SR	21	Courtney Barratt
Substitutes:
IC	8	Kate Menz
IC	13	Chloe Muggleton
IC	11	Maddison Douglass
IC	12	Cailin Ebbott
IC	17	Jamie Stephenson
Coach:
Jason Pollard

Officials:

Geordie Doherty (Referee)

Jorja Charman (Touch Judge)

Michael Bayley (Touch Judge)

FB	1	Grace Barker
WG	2	Cheyenne Grocott-Robins
CE	3	Molly Thakeray
CE	4	Lucy Woods
WG	5	Cherrae Smith
FE	6	Mackella Pye
HB	7	Rachel Corkery
LK	8	Mikaela-Rae Anderson
HK	9	Imogen Pye
SR	10	Molly Stephens
LK	11	Kirsten Hewitt
Substitutes:
IC	12	Kathleen Cusack
IC	14	Kiara Shean
IC	15	Clare Flick
IC	17	Genevieve Carmody
IC	18	Chelsea Jones
IC	19	Victoria Hegyi
IC	20	Sarah Dwyer
Coach:
Byron Campbell
