= 2023 Canberra Rugby League =

2023 Canberra Raiders Cup
- Duration: 15 April – 17 September 2023
- Teams: 9
- Broadcast partners: Bar TV Sports

The 2023 Canberra Raiders Cup will be the 25th season of the cup, the top division Rugby League club competition in Canberra. The 2023 Canberra Raiders Cup will consist of 18 regular season rounds that will begin on 15 April and end on 26 August. There will be 3 playoff rounds, beginning on 2 September with the first semi-final, and ending on 17 September with the Grand Final.

== Canberra Raiders Cup (First Grade) ==
=== Teams ===
There will be 9 teams playing in 2023. 5 teams from Canberra, 2 from Queanbeyan, 1 from Yass, and 1 from Goulburn.

Colours	Club	Season	Home ground(s)	Head coach
	Belconnen United Sharks	7th season	NSWRL HQ Bruce	Zac Patch
	Goulburn City Bulldogs	3rd season	Workers Arena	Shane McCallum
	Gungahlin Bulls	30th season	Gungahlin Enclosed Oval	Tre Holten-Williams
	Queanbeyan Kangaroos	54th season	Seears Workwear Oval	Sam Williams
	Queanbeyan United Blues	84th season	Seiffert Oval	Simon Woolford
	Tuggeranong Valley Bushrangers	20th season	Greenway Oval	Jason Kelly
	West Belconnen Warriors	48th season	Raiders Belconnen	Tim Sloman
	Woden Valley Rams	53rd season	Phillip Oval	William Thomson
	Yass United Magpies	70th season	Walker Park	Adam Kyle

=== Ladder ===
Pos	Team	Pld	W	D	L	B	PF	PA	PD	Pts
1	Queanbeyan Kangaroos	16	15	0	1	2	625	184	+441	34
2	Tuggeranong Valley Bushrangers	16	10	2	4	2	458	351	+107	26
3	West Belconnen Warriors	16	10	1	5	2	380	322	+58	25
4	Belconnen United Sharks	16	10	0	6	2	355	358	–3	24
5	Goulburn City Bulldogs	16	8	0	8	2	476	366	+110	20
6	Woden Valley Rams	16	8	0	8	2	384	381	+3	20
7	Queanbeyan United Blues	16	3	1	12	2	304	530	–226	11
8	Gungahlin Bulls	16	3	0	13	2	329	540	–211	10
9	Yass United Magpies	16	3	0	13	2	300	579	–279	10

Updated to match(es) played on 27 August 2023. Source:
Rules for classification: 1) points; 2) point difference; 3) points scored

==== Ladder progression ====
- Numbers highlighted in green indicate that the team finished the round inside the top 4.
- Numbers highlighted in blue indicates the team finished first on the ladder in that round.
- Numbers highlighted in red indicates the team finished last place on the ladder in that round.
- Underlined numbers indicate that the team had a bye during that round.

Pos	Team	1	2	3	4	5	6	7	8	9	10	11	12	13	14	15	16	17	18
1	Queanbeyan Kangaroos	2	4	6	8	10	12	14	16	18	20	22	24	26	28	28	30	32	34
2	Tuggeranong Valley Bushrangers	2	4	4	6	6	8	10	10	10	11	13	14	16	18	20	22	24	26
3	West Belconnen Warriors	2	4	6	6	6	8	10	10	10	12	14	15	17	17	19	21	23	25
4	Belconnen United Sharks	2	4	6	6	8	8	8	10	12	14	16	18	18	20	22	24	24	24
5	Goulburn City Bulldogs	0	0	2	4	4	6	8	10	12	12	12	14	14	14	16	18	20	20
6	Woden Valley Rams	2	2	2	4	6	6	8	10	12	14	14	14	16	18	20	20	20	20
7	Queanbeyan United Blues	0	2	2	4	4	4	4	6	6	7	7	7	9	9	9	9	11	11
8	Gungahlin Bulls	0	0	0	0	2	4	4	4	6	6	6	8	8	8	8	8	8	10
9	Yass United Magpies	0	0	2	2	4	4	4	4	4	4	6	6	6	8	8	8	8	10

=== Season results ===
==== Round 1 ====
Home	Score	Away	Match Information
Home	Score	Away	Date and Time	Venue	Referee	Video
Tuggeranong Valley Bushrangers	38 – 12	Queanbeyan United Blues	Saturday, 15 April, 2:00pm	Greenway Oval	D. Charman
Yass United Magpies	36 – 38	Woden Valley Rams	Saturday, 15 April, 3:00pm	Walker Park	T. Brooker
Goulburn City Bulldogs	20 – 36	Queanbeyan Kangaroos	Saturday, 15 April, 3:00pm	Workers Arena	J. McManus
Gungahlin Bulls	16 – 34	Belconnen United Sharks	Saturday, 15 April, 3:00pm	Gungahlin Enclosed Oval	A. Nightingale	★
West Belconnen Warriors		BYE

==== Round 2 ====
Home	Score	Away	Match Information
Home	Score	Away	Date and Time	Venue	Referee	Video
Woden Valley Rams	10 – 40	Queanbeyan Kangaroos	Saturday, 22 April, 3:00pm	Phillip Oval	A. Nightingale	★
Queanbeyan United Blues	34 – 22	Yass United Magpies	Saturday, 22 April, 3:00pm	Seiffert Oval	T. Brooker
Goulburn City Bulldogs	30 – 32	Tuggeranong Valley Bushrangers	Saturday, 22 April, 3:00pm	Workers Arena	J. McManus
Gungahlin Bulls	22 – 36	West Belconnen Warriors	Saturday, 22 April, 3:00pm	Gungahlin Enclosed Oval	D. Charman
Belconnen United Sharks		BYE

==== Round 3 ====
Home	Score	Away	Match Information
Home	Score	Away	Date and Time	Venue	Referee	Video
Tuggeranong Valley Bushrangers	4 – 16	West Belconnen Warriors	Saturday, 29 April, 3:00pm	Greenway Oval	J. Charman
Woden Valley Rams	6 – 20	Goulburn City Bulldogs	Saturday, 29 April, 3:00pm	Phillip Oval	T. Brooker
Queanbeyan United Blues	10 – 28	Belconnen United Sharks	Saturday, 29 April, 3:00pm	Seiffert Oval	J. McManus
Yass United Magpies	30 – 10	Gungahlin Bulls	Saturday, 29 April, 3:00pm	Walker Park	L. Barrow	★
Queanbeyan Kangaroos		BYE

==== Round 4 ====
Home	Score	Away	Match Information
Home	Score	Away	Date and Time	Venue	Referee	Video
Belconnen United Sharks	22 – 28	Tuggeranong Valley Bushrangers	Saturday, 6 May, 3:00pm	NSWRL HQ Bruce	J. McManus
West Belconnen Warriors	18 – 32	Goulburn City Bulldogs	Saturday, 6 May, 3:00pm	Raiders Belconnen	L. Barrow	★
Queanbeyan Kangaroos	24 – 16	Yass United Magpies	Saturday, 6 May, 3:00pm	Seears Workwear Oval	O. Levido
Gungahlin Bulls	10 – 12	Woden Valley Rams	Saturday, 6 May, 4:15pm	Gungahlin Enclosed Oval	J. Charman
Queanbeyan United Blues		BYE

==== Round 5 ====
Home	Score	Away	Match Information
Home	Score	Away	Date and Time	Venue	Referee	Video
Tuggeranong Valley Bushrangers	16 – 42	Gungahlin Bulls	Saturday, 13 May, 3:00pm	Greenway Oval	J. Charman
Woden Valley Rams	26 – 16	Queanbeyan United Blues	Saturday, 13 May, 3:00pm	Phillip Oval	J. McManus
Queanbeyan Kangaroos	44 – 6	West Belconnen Warriors	Saturday, 13 May, 3:00pm	Seears Workwear Oval	A. Nightingale
Goulburn City Bulldogs	24 – 28	Belconnen United Sharks	Saturday, 13 May, 3:00pm	Workers Arena	O. Levido	★
Yass United Magpies		BYE

==== Round 6 ====
Home	Score	Away	Match Information
Home	Score	Away	Date and Time	Venue	Referee	Video
Belconnen United Sharks	6 – 46	Queanbeyan Kangaroos	Saturday, 20 May, 3:00pm	NSWRL HQ Bruce	A. Nightingale	★
Yass United Magpies	16 – 22	Tuggeranong Valley Bushrangers	Saturday, 20 May, 3:00pm	Walker Park	J. McManus
Gungahlin Bulls	46 – 26	Queanbeyan United Blues	Saturday, 20 May, 3:00pm	Gungahlin Enclosed Oval	G. Miles
West Belconnen Warriors	22 – 12	Woden Valley Rams	Sunday, 21 May, 3:00pm	Raiders Belconnen	O. Levido	★
Goulburn City Bulldogs		BYE

==== Round 7 ====
Home	Score	Away	Match Information
Home	Score	Away	Date and Time	Venue	Referee	Video
Woden Valley Rams	32 – 4	Belconnen United Sharks	Saturday, 27 May, 3:00pm	Phillip Oval	A. Nightingale
Queanbeyan Kangaroos	30 – 0	Gungahlin Bulls	Saturday, 27 May, 3:00pm	Seears Workwear Oval	O. Levido
Queanbeyan United Blues	26 – 46	Goulburn City Bulldogs	Saturday, 27 May, 3:00pm	Seiffert Oval	L. Richardson	★
Yass United Magpies	0 – 48	West Belconnen Warriors	Saturday, 27 May, 3:00pm	Walker Park	G. Miles
Tuggeranong Valley Bushrangers		BYE

==== Round 8 ====
Home	Score	Away	Match Information
Home	Score	Away	Date and Time	Venue	Referee	Video
Belconnen United Sharks	42 – 14	Yass United Magpies	Saturday, 3 June, 3:00pm	NSWRL HQ Bruce	L. Richardson
West Belconnen Warriors	18 – 20	Queanbeyan United Blues	Saturday, 3 June, 3:00pm	Raiders Belconnen	G. Miles
Queanbeyan Kangaroos	44 – 10	Tuggeranong Valley Bushrangers	Saturday, 3 June, 3:00pm	Seears Workwear Oval	J. McManus	★
Gungahlin Bulls	10 – 52	Goulburn City Bulldogs	Saturday, 3 June, 4:15pm	Gungahlin Enclosed Oval	A. Nightingale
Woden Valley Rams		BYE

==== Round 9 ====
Home	Score	Away	Match Information
Home	Score	Away	Date and Time	Venue	Referee	Video
Tuggeranong Valley Bushrangers	22 – 24	Woden Valley Rams	Saturday, 17 June, 3:00pm	Greenway Oval	O. Levido	★
Belconnen United Sharks	26 – 10	West Belconnen Warriors	Saturday, 17 June, 3:00pm	NSWRL HQ Bruce	A. Nightingale
Queanbeyan United Blues	10 – 34	Queanbeyan Kangaroos	Saturday, 17 June, 3:00pm	Seiffert Oval	L. Barrow
Goulburn City Bulldogs	44 – 30	Yass United Magpies	Saturday, 17 June, 3:00pm	Workers Arena	G. Miles
Gungahlin Bulls		BYE

==== Round 10 ====
Home	Score	Away	Match Information
Home	Score	Away	Date and Time	Venue	Referee	Video
Belconnen United Sharks	34 – 32	Gungahlin Bulls	Saturday, 24 June, 3:00pm	NSWRL HQ Bruce	O. Levido
Woden Valley Rams	46 – 6	Yass United Magpies	Saturday, 24 June, 3:00pm	Phillip Oval	D. Charman
Queanbeyan Kangaroos	32 – 10	Goulburn City Bulldogs	Saturday, 24 June, 3:00pm	Seears Workwear Oval	A. Nightingale	★
Queanbeyan United Blues	32 – 32	Tuggeranong Valley Bushrangers	Saturday, 24 June, 3:00pm	Seiffert Oval	J. Charman
West Belconnen Warriors		BYE

==== Round 11 ====
Home	Score	Away	Match Information
Home	Score	Away	Date and Time	Venue	Referee	Video
Tuggeranong Valley Bushrangers	46 – 6	Goulburn City Bulldogs	Sunday, 2 July, 3:00pm	Greenway Oval	A. Nightingale
Yass United Magpies	36 – 20	Queanbeyan United Blues	Sunday, 2 July, 3:00pm	Walker Park	J. McManus	★
West Belconnen Warriors	32 – 18	Gungahlin Bulls	Sunday, 2 July, 3:00pm	Raiders Belconnen	D. Charman
Queanbeyan Kangaroos	40 – 18	Woden Valley Rams	Sunday, 2 July, 3:00pm	Seears Workwear Oval	T. Brooker
Belconnen United Sharks		BYE

==== Round 12 ====
Home	Score	Away	Match Information
Home	Score	Away	Date and Time	Venue	Referee	Video
Belconnen United Sharks	19* – 0	Queanbeyan United Blues	Saturday, 8 July, 1:30pm	NSWRL HQ Bruce	N/A
Goulburn City Bulldogs	24 – 6	Woden Valley Rams	Saturday, 8 July, 3:00pm	Workers Arena	A. Nightingale
Gungahlin Bulls	28 – 12	Yass United Magpies	Saturday, 8 July, 4:00pm	Gungahlin Enclosed Oval	T. Brooker
West Belconnen Warriors	22 – 22	Tuggeranong Valley Bushrangers	Sunday, 9 July, 3:00pm	Raiders Belconnen	J. McManus	★
Queanbeyan Kangaroos		BYE

==== Round 13 ====
Home	Score	Away	Match Information
Home	Score	Away	Date and Time	Venue	Referee	Video
Tuggeranong Valley Bushrangers	30 – 14	Belconnen United Sharks	Saturday, 15 July, 3:00pm	Greenway Oval	J. McManus	★
Woden Valley Rams	50 – 28	Gungahlin Bulls	Saturday, 15 July, 3:00pm	Phillip Oval	L. Barrow
Yass United Magpies	10 – 64	Queanbeyan Kangaroos	Saturday, 15 July, 3:00pm	Walker Park	G. Miles
Goulburn City Bulldogs	18 – 24	West Belconnen Warriors	Saturday, 15 July, 3:00pm	Workers Arena	L. Neilsen
Queanbeyan United Blues		BYE

==== Round 14 ====
Home	Score	Away	Match Information
Home	Score	Away	Date and Time	Venue	Referee	Video
Belconnen United Sharks	24 – 16	Goulburn City Bulldogs	Saturday, 22 July, 3:00pm	NSWRL HQ Bruce	A. Nightingale	★
West Belconnen Warriors	16 – 26	Queanbeyan Kangaroos	Saturday, 22 July, 3:00pm	Raiders Belconnen	J. McManus
Queanbeyan United Blues	26 – 28	Woden Valley Rams	Saturday, 22 July, 3:00pm	Seiffert Oval	J. Charman
Gungahlin Bulls	16 – 32	Tuggeranong Valley Bushrangers	Saturday, 22 July, 4:00pm	Gungahlin Enclosed Oval	G. Miles
Yass United Magpies		BYE

==== Round 15 ====
Home	Score	Away	Match Information
Home	Score	Away	Date and Time	Venue	Referee	Video
Tuggeranong Valley Bushrangers	18 – 17	Queanbeyan Kangaroos	Saturday, 5 August, 3:00pm	Greenway Oval	A. Nightingale	★
Queanbeyan United Blues	18 – 24	West Belconnen Warriors	Saturday, 5 August, 3:00pm	Seiffert Oval	J. Charman
Yass United Magpies	16 – 28	Belconnen United Sharks	Saturday, 5 August, 3:00pm	Walker Park	L. Barrow
Goulburn City Bulldogs	50 – 4	Gungahlin Bulls	Saturday, 5 August, 3:00pm	Workers Arena	J. McManus
Woden Valley Rams		BYE

==== Round 16 ====
Home	Score	Away	Match Information
Home	Score	Away	Date and Time	Venue	Referee	Video
Goulburn City Bulldogs	54 – 6	Queanbeyan United Blues	Saturday, 12 August, 2:00pm	Workers Arena	A. Nightingale
Belconnen United Sharks	20 – 14	Woden Valley Rams	Saturday, 12 August, 3:00pm	NSWRL HQ Bruce	J. McManus	★
Gungahlin Bulls	14 – 58	Queanbeyan Kangaroos	Saturday, 12 August, 4:00pm	Gungahlin Enclosed Oval	T. Brooker
West Belconnen Warriors	35 – 18	Yass United Magpies	Sunday, 13 August, 3:00pm	Raiders Belconnen	D. Charman
Tuggeranong Valley Bushrangers		BYE

==== Round 17 ====
Home	Score	Away	Match Information
Home	Score	Away	Date and Time	Venue	Referee	Video
Tuggeranong Valley Bushrangers	66 – 0	Yass United Magpies	Saturday, 19 August, 3:00pm	Greenway Oval	G. Miles
Woden Valley Rams	24 – 27	West Belconnen Warriors	Saturday, 19 August, 3:00pm	Phillip Oval	A. Nightingale	★
Queanbeyan Kangaroos	44 – 8	Belconnen United Sharks	Saturday, 19 August, 3:00pm	Seears Workwear Oval	J. McManus
Queanbeyan United Blues	36 – 33	Gungahlin Bulls	Saturday, 19 August, 3:00pm	Seiffert Oval	T. Brooker
Goulburn City Bulldogs		BYE

==== Round 18 ====
Home	Score	Away	Match Information
Home	Score	Away	Date and Time	Venue	Referee	Video
Queanbeyan Kangaroos	46 – 12	Queanbeyan United Blues	Saturday, 26 August, 2:00pm	Seears Workwear Oval	J. Charman
Woden Valley Rams	38 – 40	Tuggeranong Valley Bushrangers	Saturday, 26 August, 3:00pm	Phillip Oval	J. McManus
West Belconnen Warriors	26 – 18	Belconnen United Sharks	Saturday, 26 August, 3:00pm	Raiders Belconnen	A. Nightingale	★
Yass United Magpies	38 – 30	Goulburn City Bulldogs	Saturday, 26 August, 3:00pm	Walker Park	T. Brooker
Gungahlin Bulls		BYE

=== Finals Series ===
Minor & Major Semi-Finals
1	Queanbeyan	13
2	Tuggeranong Valley	18
3	West Belconnen	28
4	Belconnen United	30

Preliminary Final
1	Queanbeyan	40
4	Belconnen United	10

Grand Final
2	Tuggeranong Valley	6
1	Queanbeyan	34

Home	Score	Away	Match Information
Home	Score	Away	Date and Time	Venue	Referee	Video
Minor & Major Semi-Finals
West Belconnen Warriors	28 – 30	Belconnen United Sharks	Saturday, 2 September, 3:00pm	Raiders Belconnen	A. Nightingale
Queanbeyan Kangaroos	13 – 18	Tuggeranong Valley Bushrangers	Sunday, 3 September, 3:00pm	Seears Workwear Oval	J. McManus	★
Preliminary Final
Queanbeyan Kangaroos	40 – 10	Belconnen United Sharks	Sunday, 10 September, 3:20pm	Raiders Belconnen	A. Nightingale
Grand Final
Tuggeranong Valley Bushrangers	6 – 34	Queanbeyan Kangaroos	Sunday, 17 September, 3:30pm	Seiffert Oval	A. Nightingale

== Reserve Grade ==
=== Teams ===
Colours	Club	Home ground(s)	Head coach
	Belconnen United Sharks	NSWRL HQ Bruce	TBA
	Goulburn City Bulldogs	Workers Arena	TBA
	Gungahlin Bulls	Gungahlin Enclosed Oval	TBA
	Queanbeyan Kangaroos	Seears Workwear Oval	TBA
	Tuggeranong Valley Bushrangers	Greenway Oval	TBA
	West Belconnen Warriors	Raiders Belconnen	TBA
	Woden Valley Rams	Phillip Oval	TBA
	Yass United Magpies	Walker Park	TBA

=== Ladder ===
Pos	Team	Pld	W	D	L	B	PF	PA	PD	Pts
1	Gungahlin Bulls (R)	14	14	0	0	4	556	154	+402	36
2	Yass United Magpies (R)	14	9	0	5	4	272	202	+70	26
3	Tuggeranong Valley Bushrangers (R)	14	9	0	5	4	284	294	–10	26
4	Woden Valley Rams (R)	14	8	1	5	4	278	284	–6	25
5	Queanbeyan Kangaroos (R)	14	5	1	8	4	242	330	–88	19
6	Goulburn City Bulldogs (R)	14	4	0	10	4	262	328	–66	16
7	West Belconnen Warriors (R)	14	4	0	10	4	268	358	–90	16
8	Belconnen United Sharks (R)	14	2	0	12	4	178	390	–212	12

Updated to match(es) played on 27 August 2023. Source:
Rules for classification: 1) points; 2) point difference; 3) points scored

==== Ladder progression ====
- Numbers highlighted in green indicate that the team finished the round inside the top 4.
- Numbers highlighted in blue indicates the team finished first on the ladder in that round.
- Numbers highlighted in red indicates the team finished last place on the ladder in that round.
- Underlined numbers indicate that the team had a bye during that round.

Pos	Team	1	2	3	4	5	6	7	8	9	10	11	12	13	14	15	16	17	18
1	Gungahlin Bulls (R)	2	4	6	8	10	12	14	16	18	20	22	24	26	28	30	32	34	36
2	Yass United Magpies (R)	2	4	4	6	8	10	12	14	16	16	18	18	20	22	22	24	24	26
3	Tuggeranong Valley Bushrangers (R)	2	4	6	8	8	8	10	12	12	14	14	16	18	18	20	22	24	26
4	Woden Valley Rams (R)	0	2	4	4	6	8	10	12	14	16	17	19	19	21	23	23	25	25
5	Queanbeyan Kangaroos (R)	0	0	2	2	4	6	6	6	8	10	11	13	13	15	15	15	17	19
6	Goulburn City Bulldogs (R)	2	2	2	2	4	6	8	8	8	8	10	10	10	12	12	14	16	16
7	West Belconnen Warriors (R)	2	2	2	4	4	4	4	6	8	10	10	10	12	12	14	14	14	16
8	Belconnen United Sharks (R)	0	2	4	4	4	4	4	4	4	4	6	8	8	8	10	12	12	12

=== Season results ===
==== Round 1 ====
Home	Score	Away	Match Information
Home	Score	Away	Date and Time	Venue	Referee	Video
Yass United Magpies (R)	26 – 6	Woden Valley Rams (R)	Saturday, 15 April, 1:20pm	Walker Park	J. Black
Goulburn City Bulldogs (R)	30 – 16	Queanbeyan Kangaroos (R)	Saturday, 15 April, 1:20pm	Workers Arena	G. Hewitt
Gungahlin Bulls (R)	40 – 6	Belconnen United Sharks (R)	Saturday, 15 April, 1:20pm	Gungahlin Enclosed Oval	L. Snowie
West Belconnen Warriors (R)	BYE	Tuggeranong Valley Bushrangers (R)

==== Round 2 ====
Home	Score	Away	Match Information
Home	Score	Away	Date and Time	Venue	Referee	Video
Woden Valley Rams (R)	14 – 12	Queanbeyan Kangaroos (R)	Saturday, 22 April, 1:20pm	Phillip Oval	L. Snowie
Goulburn City Bulldogs (R)	24 – 30	Tuggeranong Valley Bushrangers (R)	Saturday, 22 April, 1:20pm	Workers Arena	G. Hewitt
Gungahlin Bulls (R)	38 – 12	West Belconnen Warriors (R)	Saturday, 22 April, 1:20pm	Gungahlin Enclosed Oval	J. Severs
Belconnen United Sharks (R)	BYE	Yass United Magpies (R)

==== Round 3 ====
Home	Score	Away	Match Information
Home	Score	Away	Date and Time	Venue	Referee	Video
Tuggeranong Valley Bushrangers (R)	26 – 6	West Belconnen Warriors (R)	Saturday, 29 April, 1:20pm	Greenway Oval	O. Levido
Woden Valley Rams (R)	22 – 20	Goulburn City Bulldogs (R)	Saturday, 29 April, 1:20pm	Phillip Oval	K. Nightingale
Yass United Magpies (R)	16 – 20	Gungahlin Bulls (R)	Saturday, 29 April, 1:20pm	Walker Park	J. Black
Queanbeyan Kangaroos (R)	BYE	Belconnen United Sharks (R)

==== Round 4 ====
Home	Score	Away	Match Information
Home	Score	Away	Date and Time	Venue	Referee	Video
Belconnen United Sharks (R)	16 – 28	Tuggeranong Valley Bushrangers (R)	Saturday, 6 May, 1:20pm	NSWRL HQ Bruce	K. Nightingale
West Belconnen Warriors (R)	32 – 18	Goulburn City Bulldogs (R)	Saturday, 6 May, 1:20pm	Raiders Belconnen	M. Bayley
Queanbeyan Kangaroos (R)	6 – 30	Yass United Magpies (R)	Saturday, 6 May, 1:20pm	Seears Workwear Oval	G. Doherty
Gungahlin Bulls (R)	32 – 6	Woden Valley Rams (R)	Saturday, 6 May, 2:40pm	Gungahlin Enclosed Oval	L. Richardson

==== Round 5 ====
Home	Score	Away	Match Information
Home	Score	Away	Date and Time	Venue	Referee	Video
Tuggeranong Valley Bushrangers (R)	8 – 28	Gungahlin Bulls (R)	Saturday, 13 May, 1:20pm	Greenway Oval	J. Black
Queanbeyan Kangaroos (R)	32 – 26	West Belconnen Warriors (R)	Saturday, 13 May, 1:20pm	Seears Workwear Oval	G. Miles
Goulburn City Bulldogs (R)	26 – 8	Belconnen United Sharks (R)	Saturday, 13 May, 1:20pm	Workers Arena	L. Richardson
Yass United Magpies (R)	BYE	Woden Valley Rams (R)

==== Round 6 ====
Home	Score	Away	Match Information
Home	Score	Away	Date and Time	Venue	Referee	Video
Belconnen United Sharks (R)	16 – 32	Queanbeyan Kangaroos (R)	Saturday, 20 May, 1:20pm	NSWRL HQ Bruce	A. Richardson
Yass United Magpies (R)	26 – 6	Tuggeranong Valley Bushrangers (R)	Saturday, 20 May, 1:20pm	Walker Park	L. Richardson
West Belconnen Warriors (R)	12 – 16	Woden Valley Rams (R)	Sunday, 21 May, 1:20pm	Raiders Belconnen	J. Charman
Goulburn City Bulldogs (R)	BYE	Gungahlin Bulls (R)

==== Round 7 ====
Home	Score	Away	Match Information
Home	Score	Away	Date and Time	Venue	Referee	Video
Woden Valley Rams (R)	26 – 12	Belconnen United Sharks (R)	Saturday, 27 May, 1:20pm	Phillip Oval	J. Black
Queanbeyan Kangaroos (R)	28 – 32	Gungahlin Bulls (R)	Saturday, 27 May, 1:20pm	Seears Workwear Oval	L. Barrow
Yass United Magpies (R)	30 – 8	West Belconnen Warriors (R)	Saturday, 27 May, 1:20pm	Walker Park	J. Bain
Tuggeranong Valley Bushrangers (R)	BYE	Goulburn City Bulldogs (R)

==== Round 8 ====
Home	Score	Away	Match Information
Home	Score	Away	Date and Time	Venue	Referee	Video
Belconnen United Sharks (R)	10 – 14	Yass United Magpies (R)	Saturday, 3 June, 1:20pm	NSWRL HQ Bruce	L. Snowie
Queanbeyan Kangaroos (R)	18 – 36	Tuggeranong Valley Bushrangers (R)	Saturday, 3 June, 1:20pm	Seears Workwear Oval	O. Levido
Gungahlin Bulls (R)	36 – 22	Goulburn City Bulldogs (R)	Saturday, 3 June, 2:40pm	Gungahlin Enclosed Oval	J. Black
Woden Valley Rams (R)	BYE	West Belconnen Warriors (R)

==== Round 9 ====
Home	Score	Away	Match Information
Home	Score	Away	Date and Time	Venue	Referee	Video
Tuggeranong Valley Bushrangers (R)	8 – 32	Woden Valley Rams (R)	Saturday, 17 June, 1:20pm	Greenway Oval	T. Brooker
Belconnen United Sharks (R)	6 – 36	West Belconnen Warriors (R)	Saturday, 17 June, 1:20pm	NSWRL HQ Bruce	D. Charman
Goulburn City Bulldogs (R)	18 – 22	Yass United Magpies (R)	Saturday, 17 June, 1:20pm	Workers Arena	J. Charman
Gungahlin Bulls (R)	BYE	Queanbeyan Kangaroos (R)

==== Round 10 ====
Home	Score	Away	Match Information
Home	Score	Away	Date and Time	Venue	Referee	Video
Belconnen United Sharks (R)	10 – 40	Gungahlin Bulls (R)	Saturday, 24 June, 1:20pm	NSWRL HQ Bruce	J. Bain
Woden Valley Rams (R)	34 – 20	Yass United Magpies (R)	Saturday, 24 June, 1:20pm	Phillip Oval	B. Barrie
Queanbeyan Kangaroos (R)	18 – 6	Goulburn City Bulldogs (R)	Saturday, 24 June, 1:20pm	Seears Workwear Oval	J. Black
West Belconnen Warriors (R)	BYE	Tuggeranong Valley Bushrangers (R)

==== Round 11 ====
Home	Score	Away	Match Information
Home	Score	Away	Date and Time	Venue	Referee	Video
Tuggeranong Valley Bushrangers (R)	18 – 20	Goulburn City Bulldogs (R)	Sunday, 2 July, 1:20pm	Greenway Oval	J. Charman
West Belconnen Warriors (R)	10 – 54	Gungahlin Bulls (R)	Sunday, 2 July, 1:20pm	Raiders Belconnen	J. Black
Queanbeyan Kangaroos (R)	22 – 22	Woden Valley Rams (R)	Sunday, 2 July, 1:20pm	Seears Workwear Oval	G. Miles
Belconnen United Sharks (R)	BYE	Yass United Magpies (R)

==== Round 12 ====
Home	Score	Away	Match Information
Home	Score	Away	Date and Time	Venue	Referee	Video
Goulburn City Bulldogs (R)	16 – 20	Woden Valley Rams (R)	Saturday, 8 July, 1:30pm	Workers Arena	J. Severs
Gungahlin Bulls (R)	32 – 0	Yass United Magpies (R)	Saturday, 8 July, 2:30pm	Gungahlin Enclosed Oval	G. Miles
West Belconnen Warriors (R)	24 – 32	Tuggeranong Valley Bushrangers (R)	Sunday, 9 July, 1:20pm	Raiders Belconnen	L. Richardson
Queanbeyan Kangaroos (R)	BYE	Belconnen United Sharks (R)

==== Round 13 ====
Home	Score	Away	Match Information
Home	Score	Away	Date and Time	Venue	Referee	Video
Tuggeranong Valley Bushrangers (R)	32 – 16	Belconnen United Sharks (R)	Saturday, 15 July, 1:20pm	Greenway Oval	J. Severs
Woden Valley Rams (R)	16 – 40	Gungahlin Bulls (R)	Saturday, 15 July, 1:20pm	Phillip Oval	A. Nightingale
Yass United Magpies (R)	16 – 12	Queanbeyan Kangaroos (R)	Saturday, 15 July, 1:20pm	Walker Park	L. Richardson
Goulburn City Bulldogs (R)	18 – 32	West Belconnen Warriors (R)	Saturday, 15 July, 1:20pm	Workers Arena	A. Hayward

==== Round 14 ====
Home	Score	Away	Match Information
Home	Score	Away	Date and Time	Venue	Referee	Video
Belconnen United Sharks (R)	10 – 22	Goulburn City Bulldogs (R)	Saturday, 22 July, 1:20pm	NSWRL HQ Bruce	K. Nightingale
West Belconnen Warriors (R)	6 – 12	Queanbeyan Kangaroos (R)	Saturday, 22 July, 1:20pm	Raiders Belconnen	J. Black
Gungahlin Bulls (R)	52 – 4	Tuggeranong Valley Bushrangers (R)	Saturday, 22 July, 2:30pm	Gungahlin Enclosed Oval	T. Brooker
Yass United Magpies (R)	BYE	Woden Valley Rams (R)

==== Round 15 ====
Home	Score	Away	Match Information
Home	Score	Away	Date and Time	Venue	Referee	Video
Tuggeranong Valley Bushrangers (R)	14 – 6	Queanbeyan Kangaroos (R)	Saturday, 5 August, 1:20pm	Greenway Oval	J. Severs
Yass United Magpies (R)	8 – 14	Belconnen United Sharks (R)	Saturday, 5 August, 1:20pm	Walker Park	K. Nightingale
Goulburn City Bulldogs (R)	12 – 36	Gungahlin Bulls (R)	Saturday, 5 August, 1:20pm	Workers Arena	T. Brooker
Woden Valley Rams (R)	BYE	West Belconnen Warriors (R)

==== Round 16 ====
Home	Score	Away	Match Information
Home	Score	Away	Date and Time	Venue	Referee	Video
Belconnen United Sharks (R)	24 – 22	Woden Valley Rams (R)	Saturday, 12 August, 1:20pm	NSWRL HQ Bruce	L. Barrow
Gungahlin Bulls (R)	78 – 4	Queanbeyan Kangaroos (R)	Saturday, 12 August, 2:30pm	Gungahlin Enclosed Oval	G. Miles
West Belconnen Warriors (R)	10 – 24	Yass United Magpies (R)	Sunday, 13 August, 1:20pm	Raiders Belconnen	J. Charman
Tuggeranong Valley Bushrangers (R)	BYE	Goulburn City Bulldogs (R)

==== Round 17 ====
Home	Score	Away	Match Information
Home	Score	Away	Date and Time	Venue	Referee	Video
Tuggeranong Valley Bushrangers (R)	16 – 12	Yass United Magpies (R)	Saturday, 19 August, 1:20pm	Greenway Oval	J. Black
Woden Valley Rams (R)	26 – 14	West Belconnen Warriors (R)	Saturday, 19 August, 1:20pm	Phillip Oval	G. Doherty
Queanbeyan Kangaroos (R)	24 – 4	Belconnen United Sharks (R)	Saturday, 19 August, 1:20pm	Seears Workwear Oval	J. Severs
Goulburn City Bulldogs (R)	BYE	Gungahlin Bulls (R)

==== Round 18 ====
Home	Score	Away	Match Information
Home	Score	Away	Date and Time	Venue	Referee	Video
Woden Valley Rams (R)	16 – 26	Tuggeranong Valley Bushrangers (R)	Saturday, 26 August, 1:20pm	Phillip Oval	G. Miles
West Belconnen Warriors (R)	40 – 28	Belconnen United Sharks (R)	Saturday, 26 August, 1:20pm	Raiders Belconnen	L. Richardson
Yass United Magpies (R)	28 – 10	Goulburn City Bulldogs (R)	Saturday, 26 August, 1:20pm	Walker Park	J. Severs
Gungahlin Bulls (R)	BYE	Queanbeyan Kangaroos (R)

=== Finals Series ===
Minor & Major Semi-Finals
1	Gungahlin	22
2	Yass United	16
3	Tuggeranong Valley	24
4	Woden Valley	10

Preliminary Final
2	Yass United	18
3	Tuggeranong Valley	24

Grand Final
1	Gungahlin	36
3	Tuggeranong Valley	20

Home	Score	Away	Match Information
Home	Score	Away	Date and Time	Venue	Referee	Video
Minor & Major Semi-Finals
Tuggeranong Valley Bushrangers (R)	24 – 10	Woden Valley Rams (R)	Saturday, 2 September, 1:20pm	Raiders Belconnen	L. Barrow
Gungahlin Bulls (R)	22 – 16	Yass United Magpies (R)	Sunday, 3 September, 1:30pm	Seears Workwear Oval	J. Charman
Preliminary Final
Yass United Magpies (R)	18 – 24	Tuggeranong Valley Bushrangers (R)	Sunday, 10 September, 1:45pm	Raiders Belconnen	J. McManus
Grand Final
Gungahlin Bulls (R)	36 – 20	Tuggeranong Valley Bushrangers (R)	Sunday, 17 September, 1:40pm	Seiffert Oval	J. McManus

== George Tooke Shield (Second Division) ==
There will be 9 teams playing in 2022. 3 teams from Canberra. 6 teams from New South Wales towns surrounding Canberra.

2022 George Tooke Shield
- Duration: 2 April – 3 September
- Teams: 9
- Broadcast partners: Bar TV Sports

Colours	Club	Season	Home ground(s)	Head coach
	Boomanulla Raiders	37th season	Boomanulla Oval	TBA
	Boorowa Rovers	15th season	Boorowa Showground	TBA
	Bungendore Tigers	58th season	Mick Sherd Oval	TBA
	Burrangong Bears	3rd season	Cranfield Oval	TBA
	Cootamundra Bulldogs	3rd season	Les Boyd Oval	TBA
	Crookwell Green Devils	30th season	Crookwell Memorial Oval	TBA
	Harden-Murrumburrah Hawks	14th season	McLean Oval	TBA
	North Canberra Bears	13th season	Kaleen Enclosed Oval	TBA
	University of Canberra Stars	7th season	Raiders Belconnen	TBA

=== Ladder ===
Pos	Team	Pld	W	D	L	B	PF	PA	PD	Pts
1	Crookwell Green Devils	14	11	0	3	2	466	198	+268	26
2	Boorowa Rovers	14	11	0	3	2	350	192	+158	26
3	Bungendore Tigers	14	10	1	3	2	470	180	+290	25
4	Harden-Murrumburrah Hawks	14	10	1	3	2	404	208	+196	25
5	North Canberra Bears	14	8	0	6	2	277	274	+3	20
6	Cootamundra Bulldogs	14	7	0	7	2	346	259	+87	18
7	Boomanulla Raiders	14	3	0	11	2	176	453	–277	10
8	University of Canberra Stars	14	2	0	12	2	242	543	–301	8
9	Burrangong Bears	14	0	0	14	2	100	524	–424	4

Updated to match(es) played on 13 August 2023. Source:
Rules for classification: 1) points; 2) points difference; 3) points scored

==== Ladder Progression ====
- Numbers highlighted in green indicate that the team finished the round inside the top 5.
- Numbers highlighted in blue indicates the team finished first on the ladder in that round.
- Numbers highlighted in red indicates the team finished last place on the ladder in that round.
- Underlined numbers indicate that the team had a bye during that round.

Pos	Team	1	2	3	4	5	6	7	8	9	10	11	12	13	14	15	16
1	Crookwell Green Devils	0	2	2	2	4	6	8	10	12	14	16	18	20	22	24	26
2	Boorowa Rovers	0	2	4	6	6	8	10	12	12	14	16	18	20	22	24	26
3	Bungendore Tigers	2	4	6	8	10	12	14	15	17	19	19	19	19	21	23	25
4	Harden-Murrumburrah Hawks	2	4	6	8	10	12	14	15	17	17	19	19	21	23	25	25
5	North Canberra Bears	2	2	4	4	4	6	6	8	10	10	12	14	14	16	18	20
6	Cootamundra Bulldogs	0	2	2	4	6	6	6	8	10	12	12	14	16	16	16	18
7	Boomanulla Raiders	2	2	4	4	4	4	4	4	4	6	8	10	10	10	10	10
8	University of Canberra Stars	2	2	2	4	4	4	6	6	6	6	6	6	8	8	8	8
9	Burrangong Bears	0	0	0	0	2	2	2	2	2	2	4	4	4	4	4	4

=== Season Results ===
==== Round 1 ====
Home	Score	Away	Match Information
Home	Score	Away	Date and Time	Venue	Referee	Video
Bungendore Tigers	28 – 6	Crookwell Green Devils	Saturday, 15 April, 2:00pm	Mick Sherd Oval	M. Bayley
Burrangong Bears	16 – 30	Boomanulla Raiders	Saturday, 15 April, 2:30pm	Cranfield Oval	K. Nightingale
North Canberra Bears	16 – 8	Boorowa Rovers	Saturday, 15 April, 2:30pm	Kaleen Enclosed Oval	J. Severs
Harden-Murrumburrah Hawks	28 – 24	Cootamundra Bulldogs	Saturday, 15 April, 3:00pm	McLean Oval	L. Richardson
University of Canberra Stars		BYE

==== Round 2 ====
Home	Score	Away	Match Information
Home	Score	Away	Date and Time	Venue	Referee	Video
Cootamundra Bulldogs	32 – 12	Burrangong Bears	Friday, 21 April, 7:15pm	Les Boyd Oval	J. Black
Bungendore Tigers	36 – 10	North Canberra Bears	Saturday, 22 April, 2:00pm	Mick Sherd Oval	L. Barrow
Crookwell Green Devils	30 – 18	Boomanulla Raiders	Saturday, 22 April, 2:30pm	Crookwell Memorial Oval	M. Bayley
University of Canberra Stars	24 – 34	Boorowa Rovers	Saturday, 22 April, 2:30pm	Raiders Belconnen	J. Charman
Harden-Murrumburrah Hawks		BYE

==== Round 3 ====
Home	Score	Away	Match Information
Home	Score	Away	Date and Time	Venue	Referee	Video
North Canberra Bears	20 – 0	Burrangong Bears	Saturday, 29 April, 2:30pm	Kaleen Enclosed Oval	J. Gould
Cootamundra Bulldogs	18 – 21	Bungendore Tigers	Saturday, 29 April, 2:30pm	Les Boyd Oval	D. Charman
Harden-Murrumburrah Hawks	34 – 12	University of Canberra Stars	Saturday, 29 April, 3:00pm	McLean Oval	J. Severs
Boorowa Rovers	16 – 8	Crookwell Green Devils	Sunday, 30 April, 3:30pm	Boorowa Showground	A. Nightingale
Boomanulla Raiders		BYE

==== Round 4 ====
Home	Score	Away	Match Information
Home	Score	Away	Date and Time	Venue	Referee	Video
Crookwell Green Devils	16 – 20	Harden-Murrumburrah Hawks	Saturday, 6 May, 1:10pm	Crookwell Memorial Oval	D. Charman
Boomanulla Raiders	24 – 44	Boorowa Rovers	Saturday, 6 May, 2:00pm	Boomanulla Oval	J. Severs
Burrangong Bears	14 – 50	University of Canberra Stars	Saturday, 6 May, 2:00pm	Cranfield Oval	G. Miles
Cootamundra Bulldogs	24 – 10	North Canberra Bears	Saturday, 6 May, 2:30pm	Les Boyd Oval	H. Fallah
Bungendore Tigers		BYE

==== Round 5 ====
Home	Score	Away	Match Information
Home	Score	Away	Date and Time	Venue	Referee	Video
Boomanulla Raiders	10 – 18	Cootamundra Bulldogs	Saturday, 20 May, 2:00pm	Boomanulla Oval	L. Barrow
Boorowa Rovers	6 – 28	Harden-Murrumburrah Hawks	Saturday, 20 May, 2:30pm	Boorowa Showground	R. Walters
North Canberra Bears	6 – 50	Crookwell Green Devils	Saturday, 20 May, 2:30pm	Kaleen Enclosed Oval	D. Charman
University of Canberra Stars	6 – 30	Bungendore Tigers	Saturday, 20 May, 2:30pm	Raiders Belconnen	J. Black
Burrangong Bears		BYE

==== Round 6 ====
Home	Score	Away	Match Information
Home	Score	Away	Date and Time	Venue	Referee	Video
Burrangong Bears	6 – 28	Harden-Murrumburrah Hawks	Saturday, 27 May, 2:00pm	Cranfield Oval	J. McManus
Bungendore Tigers	42 – 10	Boomanulla Raiders	Saturday, 27 May, 2:00pm	Mick Sherd Oval	J. Severs
Crookwell Green Devils	48 – 8	University of Canberra Stars	Saturday, 27 May, 2:30pm	Crookwell Memorial Oval	T. Brooker
Cootamundra Bulldogs	10 – 20	Boorowa Rovers	Saturday, 27 May, 2:30pm	Les Boyd Oval	H. Fallah
North Canberra Bears		BYE

==== Round 7 ====
Home	Score	Away	Match Information
Home	Score	Away	Date and Time	Venue	Referee	Video
Bungendore Tigers	78 – 4	Burrangong Bears	Saturday, 3 June, 2:00pm	Mick Sherd Oval	L. Barrow
North Canberra Bears	12 – 18	Harden-Murrumburrah Hawks	Saturday, 3 June, 2:30pm	Kaleen Enclosed Oval	D. Charman
Crookwell Green Devils	26 – 8	Cootamundra Bulldogs	Sunday, 4 June, 2:00pm	Crookwell Memorial Oval	A. Richardson
Boomanulla Raiders	12 – 28	University of Canberra Stars	Sunday, 4 June, 2:30pm	Boomanulla Oval	J. Charman
Boorowa Rovers		BYE

==== Round 8 ====
Home	Score	Away	Match Information
Home	Score	Away	Date and Time	Venue	Referee	Video
Boomanulla Raiders	14 – 22	North Canberra Bears	Saturday, 17 June, 2:00pm	Boomanulla Oval	K. Nightingale
Boorowa Rovers	44 – 6	Burrangong Bears	Saturday, 17 June, 2:30pm	Boorowa Showground	R. Walters
Cootamundra Bulldogs	50 – 16	University of Canberra Stars	Saturday, 17 June, 2:30pm	Les Boyd Oval	H. Fallah
Harden-Murrumburrah Hawks	16 – 16	Bungendore Tigers	Saturday, 17 June, 3:00pm	McLean Oval	J. Black
Crookwell Green Devils		BYE

==== Round 9 ====
Home	Score	Away	Match Information
Home	Score	Away	Date and Time	Venue	Referee	Video
Bungendore Tigers	28 – 10	Boorowa Rovers	Saturday, 24 June, 2:00pm	Mick Sherd Oval	K. Nightingale
Crookwell Green Devils	46 – 6	Burrangong Bears	Saturday, 24 June, 2:30pm	Crookwell Memorial Oval	L. Barrow
North Canberra Bears	25 – 18	University of Canberra Stars	Saturday, 24 June, 2:30pm	Kaleen Enclosed Oval	J. Severs
Harden-Murrumburrah Hawks	72 – 10	Boomanulla Raiders	Saturday, 24 June, 3:00pm	McLean Oval	J. McManus
Cootamundra Bulldogs		BYE

==== Round 10 ====
Home	Score	Away	Match Information
Home	Score	Away	Date and Time	Venue	Referee	Video
University of Canberra Stars	18 – 32	Boomanulla Raiders	Saturday, 1 July, 2:00pm	Raiders Belconnen	M. Bayley
Burrangong Bears	12 – 50	Cootamundra Bulldogs	Saturday, 1 July, 2:00pm	Cranfield Oval	J. Reimer
Bungendore Tigers	36 – 10	Harden-Murrumburrah Hawks	Sunday, 2 July, 2:00pm	Mick Sherd Oval	L. Barrow
Crookwell Green Devils	42 – 12	North Canberra Bears	Sunday, 2 July, 2:30pm	Crookwell Memorial Oval	L. Richardson
Boorowa Rovers		BYE

==== Round 11 ====
Home	Score	Away	Match Information
Home	Score	Away	Date and Time	Venue	Referee	Video
Boorowa Rovers	28 – 12	Cootamundra Bulldogs	Saturday, 8 July, 2:30pm	Boorowa Showground	D. Charman
North Canberra Bears	26 – 12	Bungendore Tigers	Saturday, 8 July, 2:30pm	Kaleen Enclosed Oval	A. Richardson
University of Canberra Stars	10 – 58	Crookwell Green Devils	Saturday, 8 July, 2:30pm	Raiders Belconnen	M. Bayley
Boomanulla Raiders	BYE	Harden-Murrumburrah Hawks
Burrangong Bears	BYE

==== Round 12 ====
Home	Score	Away	Match Information
Home	Score	Away	Date and Time	Venue	Referee	Video
Boomanulla Raiders	33* – 0	Burrangong Bears	Saturday, 15 July, 2:00pm	Boomanulla Oval	N/A
Boorowa Rovers	32 – 20	Bungendore Tigers	Saturday, 15 July, 2:30pm	Boorowa Showground	D. Charman
University of Canberra Stars	4 – 32	North Canberra Bears	Saturday, 15 July, 2:30pm	Raiders Belconnen	K. Nightingale
Harden-Murrumburrah Hawks	18 – 26	Crookwell Green Devils	Saturday, 15 July, 3:00pm	McLean Oval	H. Fallah
Cootamundra Bulldogs		BYE

==== Round 13 ====
Home	Score	Away	Match Information
Home	Score	Away	Date and Time	Venue	Referee	Video
Boorowa Rovers	32 – 0	North Canberra Bears	Saturday, 22 July, 2:30pm	Boorowa Showground	L. Barrow
Cootamundra Bulldogs	36 – 6	Boomanulla Raiders	Saturday, 22 July, 2:30pm	Les Boyd Oval	M. Bayley
Harden-Murrumburrah Hawks	36 – 0	Burrangong Bears	Saturday, 22 July, 4:00pm	McLean Oval	D. Charman
Crookwell Green Devils	26 – 14	Bungendore Tigers	Sunday, 23 July, 2:30pm	Crookwell Memorial Oval	H. Fallah
University of Canberra Stars		BYE

==== Round 14 ====
Home	Score	Away	Match Information
Home	Score	Away	Date and Time	Venue	Referee	Video
Boomanulla Raiders	10 – 40	Crookwell Green Devils	Saturday, 29 July, 2:00pm	Raiders Belconnen	L. Barrow
Bungendore Tigers	76 – 6	University of Canberra Stars	Saturday, 29 July, 2:00pm	Mick Sherd Oval	M. Bayley
Cootamundra Bulldogs	12 – 20	Harden-Murrumburrah Hawks	Saturday, 29 July, 2:30pm	Les Boyd Oval	K. Nightingale	★
Burrangong Bears	0 – 33*	Boorowa Rovers	Sunday, 30 July, 2:00pm	Cranfield Oval	N/A
North Canberra Bears		BYE

==== Round 15 ====
Home	Score	Away	Match Information
Home	Score	Away	Date and Time	Venue	Referee	Video
Burrangong Bears	0 – 33*	Bungendore Tigers	Saturday, 5 August, 2:00pm	Cranfield Oval	N/A
Boorowa Rovers	23* – 0	Boomanulla Raiders	Saturday, 5 August, 2:30pm	Boorowa Showground	N/A
North Canberra Bears	22 – 16	Cootamundra Bulldogs	Saturday, 5 August, 2:30pm	Kaleen Enclosed Oval	G. Miles
University of Canberra Stars	12 – 62	Harden-Murrumburrah Hawks	Saturday, 5 August, 2:30pm	NSWRL HQ Bruce	D. Charman
Crookwell Green Devils		BYE

==== Round 16 ====
Home	Score	Away	Match Information
Home	Score	Away	Date and Time	Venue	Referee	Video
Boomanulla Raiders	0 – 64	North Canberra Bears	Saturday, 12 August, 2:00pm	Kaleen Enclosed Oval	J. Severs
Burrangong Bears	24 – 44	Crookwell Green Devils	Saturday, 12 August, 2:00pm	Cranfield Oval	J. Black
University of Canberra Stars	30 – 36	Cootamundra Bulldogs	Saturday, 12 August, 2:30pm	Raiders Belconnen	L. Richardson
Harden-Murrumburrah Hawks	16 – 20	Boorowa Rovers	Saturday, 12 August, 4:40pm	McLean Oval	H. Fallah
Bungendore Tigers		BYE

=== Finals Series ===
Qualifying Final
2	Boorowa	36
3	Bungendore	6
4	Harden-Murrumburrah	32
5	North Canberra	14

Major Semi-Final
1	Crookwell	31
2	Boorowa	30
Minor Semi-Final
3	Bungendore	24
4	Harden-Murrumburrah	10

Preliminary Final
2	Boorowa	32
3	Bungendore	22

Grand Final
1	Crookwell	8
2	Boorowa	22

Home	Score	Away	Match Information
Home	Score	Away	Date and Time	Venue	Referee	Video
Qualifying & Elimination Finals
Harden-Murrumburrah Hawks	32 – 14	North Canberra Bears	Saturday, 19 August, 2:00pm	McLean Oval	H. Fallah
Boorowa Rovers	36 – 6	Bungendore Tigers	Saturday, 19 August, 2:30pm	Boorowa Showground	D. Charman
Minor & Major Semi-Finals
Crookwell Green Devils	31 – 30	Boorowa Rovers	Saturday, 26 August, 2:15pm	Crookwell Memorial Oval	D. Charman	★
Bungendore Tigers	24 – 10	Harden-Murrumburrah Hawks	Saturday, 26 August, 2:15pm	Mick Sherd Oval	H. Fallah
Preliminary Final
Boorowa Rovers	32 – 22	Bungendore Tigers	Saturday, 2 September, 2:15pm	Boorowa Showground	D. Charman
Grand Final
Crookwell Green Devils	8 – 22	Boorowa Rovers	Saturday, 9 September, 2:30pm	Crookwell Memorial Oval	D. Charman	★

== Katrina Fanning Shield (Open Women's Tackle) ==
The 2023 Katrina Fanning Shield will feature 10 teams. There will be qualification phase, where all 10 teams play each other once. After the qualification phase, all 10 teams will be split into two different divisions. The top division will compete for the Katrina Fanning Shield and the lower division will compete for the Katrina Fanning Cup. Leading up to round 8, the University of Canberra Stars pulled out of the competition, which changed the format for the second phase. The Top 4 will play in the first division, with the bottom 5 playing in the second division.

=== Teams ===
Colours	Club	Home ground(s)	Head coach
	Goulburn City Bulldogs	Workers Arena	TBA
	Gungahlin Bulls	Gungahlin Enclosed Oval	TBA
	Harden-Murrumburrah Worhawks	McLean Oval	TBA
	Queanbeyan Kangaroos	Seears Workwear Oval	TBA
	Queanbeyan United Blues	Seiffert Oval	TBA
	Tuggeranong Valley Bushrangers	Greenway Oval	TBA
	University of Canberra Stars	Raiders Belconnen	TBA
	West Belconnen Warriors	Raiders Belconnen	TBA
	Woden Valley Rams	Phillip Oval	TBA
	Yass United Magpies	Walker Park	TBA

=== Qualifying Ladder ===
Pos	Team	Pld	W	D	L	B	PF	PA	PD	Pts	Qualification
1	Gungahlin Bulls (W)	9	9	0	0	0	357	60	+297	18	Qualification to Katrina Fanning Shield
2	Yass United Magpies (W)	9	7	1	1	0	375	72	+303	15	Qualification to Katrina Fanning Shield
3	West Belconnen Warriors (W)	9	6	1	2	0	292	60	+232	13	Qualification to Katrina Fanning Shield
4	Goulburn City Bulldogs (W)	9	6	1	2	0	245	184	+61	13	Qualification to Katrina Fanning Shield
5	Harden-Murrumburrah Worhawks	9	4	1	4	0	201	228	–27	9	Qualification to Katrina Fanning Cup
6	Tuggeranong Valley Bushrangers (W)	9	3	1	5	0	194	162	+32	7	Qualification to Katrina Fanning Cup
7	Queanbeyan United Blues (W)	9	3	1	5	0	196	195	+1	7	Qualification to Katrina Fanning Cup
8	Woden Valley Rams (W)	9	3	0	6	0	172	317	–145	6	Qualification to Katrina Fanning Cup
9	Queanbeyan Kangaroos (W)	9	1	0	8	0	70	475	–405	2	Qualification to Katrina Fanning Cup
10	University of Canberra Stars (W)	9	0	0	9	0	18	367	–349	0	

Updated to match(es) played on 9 July 2023. Source:
Rules for classification: 1) points; 2) point difference; 3) points scored

==== Qualifying Ladder progression ====
- Numbers highlighted in green indicate that the team finished the round inside the top 5 (Rounds 1-7), top 4 (Rounds 8-9)
- Numbers highlighted in yellow indicate that the team finished the round outside the top 5 (Rounds 1-7), top 4 (Rounds 8-9).

Pos	Team	1	2	3	4	5	6	7	8	9
1	Gungahlin Bulls (W)	2	4	6	8	10	12	14	16	18
2	Yass United Magpies (W)	2	4	6	7	9	11	13	15	15
3	West Belconnen Warriors (W)	0	2	4	5	7	9	11	11	13
4	Goulburn City Bulldogs (W)	2	3	5	7	7	7	9	11	13
5	Harden-Murrumburrah Worhawks	0	1	3	5	5	5	5	7	9
6	Tuggeranong Valley Bushrangers (W)	2	2	2	4	6	6	7	7	7
7	Queanbeyan United Blues (W)	2	4	4	4	4	6	7	7	7
8	Woden Valley Rams (W)	0	0	0	0	2	4	4	6	6
9	Queanbeyan Kangaroos (W)	0	0	0	0	0	0	0	0	2
10	University of Canberra Stars (W)	0	0	0	0	0	0	0	0	0

=== Qualifying Results ===
==== Round 1 ====
Home	Score	Away	Match Information
Home	Score	Away	Date and Time	Venue	Referee	Video
West Belconnen Warriors (W)	4 – 6	Goulburn City Bulldogs (W)	Saturday, 6 May, 9:20am	Raiders Belconnen	B. Munroe
Queanbeyan United Blues (W)	48 – 0	University of Canberra Stars (W)	Saturday, 6 May, 10:00am	Boomanulla Oval	J. Charman
Harden-Murrumburrah Worhawks	0 – 44*	Tuggeranong Valley Bushrangers (W)	Saturday, 6 May, 10:30am	NSWRL HQ Bruce	N/A
Queanbeyan Kangaroos (W)	0 – 86	Yass United Magpies (W)	Saturday, 6 May, 11:50am	Seears Workwear Oval	L. Snowie
Gungahlin Bulls (W)	46 – 6	Woden Valley Rams (W)	Saturday, 6 May, 1:00pm	Gungahlin Enclosed Oval	J. Bain

==== Round 2 ====
Home	Score	Away	Match Information
Home	Score	Away	Date and Time	Venue	Referee	Video
Yass United Magpies (W)	27* – 0	University of Canberra Stars (W)	Saturday, 13 May, 10:00am	N/A	N/A
Tuggeranong Valley Bushrangers (W)	12 – 38	Gungahlin Bulls (W)	Saturday, 13 May, 10:30am	Greenway Oval	M. Bayley
Goulburn City Bulldogs (W)	28 – 28	Harden-Murrumburrah Worhawks	Saturday, 13 May, 11:50am	Workers Arena	J. Bain
Queanbeyan Kangaroos (W)	6 – 64	West Belconnen Warriors (W)	Saturday, 13 May, 11:50am	Seears Workwear Oval	K. Nightingale
Woden Valley Rams (W)	12 – 34	Queanbeyan United Blues (W)	Saturday, 13 May, 12:00pm	Phillip Oval	J. Severs

==== Round 3 ====
Home	Score	Away	Match Information
Home	Score	Away	Date and Time	Venue	Referee	Video
Harden-Murrumburrah Worhawks	66 – 16	Queanbeyan Kangaroos (W)	Saturday, 20 May, 10:30am	NSWRL HQ Bruce	J. Bain
Yass United Magpies (W)	18 – 10	Tuggeranong Valley Bushrangers (W)	Saturday, 20 May, 10:50am	Walker Park	G. Doherty
University of Canberra Stars (W)	4 – 56	Goulburn City Bulldogs (W)	Saturday, 20 May, 11:50am	Raiders Belconnen	B. Munroe
Gungahlin Bulls (W)	42 – 6	Queanbeyan United Blues (W)	Saturday, 20 May, 1:20pm	Gungahlin Enclosed Oval	L. Snowie
West Belconnen Warriors (W)	37* – 0	Woden Valley Rams (W)	Sunday, 21 May, 9:20am	Raiders Belconnen	N/A

==== Round 4 ====
Home	Score	Away	Match Information
Home	Score	Away	Date and Time	Venue	Referee	Video
Woden Valley Rams (W)	20 – 32	Harden-Murrumburrah Worhawks	Saturday, 27 May, 10:30am	Phillip Oval	G. Doherty
Tuggeranong Valley Bushrangers (W)	16 – 0	University of Canberra Stars (W)	Saturday, 27 May, 10:30am	Seiffert Oval	D. Charman
Yass United Magpies (W)	26 – 26	West Belconnen Warriors (W)	Saturday, 27 May, 11:50am	Walker Park	M. Bayley
Queanbeyan Kangaroos (W)	0 – 9*	Gungahlin Bulls (W)	Saturday, 27 May, 12:00pm	Seears Workwear Oval	N/A
Queanbeyan United Blues (W)	0 – 9*	Goulburn City Bulldogs (W)	Saturday, 27 May, 12:00pm	Seiffert Oval	N/A

==== Round 5 ====
Home	Score	Away	Match Information
Home	Score	Away	Date and Time	Venue	Referee	Video
Yass United Magpies (W)	52* – 0	Harden-Murrumburrah Worhawks	Saturday, 3 June, 11:45am	North Kaleen Oval	N/A
Queanbeyan Kangaroos (W)	0 – 62	Tuggeranong Valley Bushrangers (W)	Saturday, 3 June, 11:50am	Seears Workwear Oval	K. Nightingale
West Belconnen Warriors (W)	48 – 10	Queanbeyan United Blues (W)	Saturday, 3 June, 12:00pm	Raiders Belconnen	J. Severs
Gungahlin Bulls (W)	74 – 0	Goulburn City Bulldogs (W)	Saturday, 3 June, 1:00pm	Gungahlin Enclosed Oval	M. Bayley
Woden Valley Rams (W)	42 – 10	University of Canberra Stars (W)	Sunday, 4 June, 1:00pm	Boomanulla Oval	J. Charman

==== Round 6 ====
Home	Score	Away	Match Information
Home	Score	Away	Date and Time	Venue	Referee	Video
Tuggeranong Valley Bushrangers (W)	22 – 30	Woden Valley Rams (W)	Saturday, 17 June, 10:30am	Greenway Oval	A. O'Brien
University of Canberra Stars (W)	0 – 41*	West Belconnen Warriors (W)	Saturday, 17 June, 10:30am	NSWRL HQ Bruce	N/A
Goulburn City Bulldogs (W)	0 – 50	Yass United Magpies (W)	Saturday, 17 June, 10:40am	Workers Arena	M. Ryan
Harden-Murrumburrah Worhawks	12 – 34	Gungahlin Bulls (W)	Saturday, 17 June, 11:30am	McLean Oval	J. Black
Queanbeyan United Blues (W)	82 – 0	Queanbeyan Kangaroos (W)	Saturday, 17 June, 12:00pm	Seiffert Oval	L. Snowie

==== Round 7 ====
Home	Score	Away	Match Information
Home	Score	Away	Date and Time	Venue	Referee	Video
Woden Valley Rams (W)	2 – 60	Yass United Magpies (W)	Saturday, 24 June, 9:20am	Phillip Oval	T. Lidbury
Gungahlin Bulls (W)	80 – 4	University of Canberra Stars (W)	Saturday, 24 June, 11:45am	Kaleen Enclosed Oval	J. Gould
Queanbeyan Kangaroos (W)	0 – 52	Goulburn City Bulldogs (W)	Saturday, 24 June, 11:50am	Seears Workwear Oval	L. Richardson
Queanbeyan United Blues (W)	10 – 10	Tuggeranong Valley Bushrangers (W)	Saturday, 24 June, 12:00pm	Seiffert Oval	J. Charman
Harden-Murrumburrah Worhawks	6 – 34	West Belconnen Warriors (W)	Saturday, 24 June, 1:30pm	McLean Oval	J. McManus

==== Round 8 ====
Home	Score	Away	Match Information
Home	Score	Away	Date and Time	Venue	Referee	Video
University of Canberra Stars (W)	0 – 23*	Harden-Murrumburrah Worhawks	Saturday, 1 July, 11:50am	Raiders Belconnen	N/A
West Belconnen Warriors (W)	4 – 6	Gungahlin Bulls (W)	Sunday, 2 July, 9:20am	Raiders Belconnen	M. Ryan
Tuggeranong Valley Bushrangers (W)	18 – 32	Goulburn City Bulldogs (W)	Sunday, 2 July, 10:30am	Greenway Oval	A. O'Brien
Queanbeyan Kangaroos (W)	14 – 54	Woden Valley Rams (W)	Sunday, 2 July, 11:50am	Seears Workwear Oval	D. Wheeler
Yass United Magpies (W)	40 – 6	Queanbeyan United Blues (W)	Sunday, 2 July, 1:20pm	Walker Park	J. Bain

==== Round 9 ====
Home	Score	Away	Match Information
Home	Score	Away	Date and Time	Venue	Referee	Video
Goulburn City Bulldogs (W)	62 – 6	Woden Valley Rams (W)	Saturday, 8 July, 10:40am	Workers Arena	L. Barrow
University of Canberra Stars (W)	0 – 34*	Queanbeyan Kangaroos (W)	Saturday, 8 July, 11:50am	Raiders Belconnen	N/A
Queanbeyan United Blues (W)	0 – 34*	Harden-Murrumburrah Worhawks	Saturday, 8 July, 12:00pm	NSWRL HQ Bruce	N/A
Gungahlin Bulls (W)	28 – 16	Yass United Magpies (W)	Saturday, 8 July, 1:00pm	Gungahlin Enclosed Oval	A. O'Brien
West Belconnen Warriors (W)	34* – 0	Tuggeranong Valley Bushrangers (W)	Sunday, 9 July, 9:20am	Raiders Belconnen	N/A

=== Katrina Fanning Shield Ladder ===
Pos	Team	Pld	W	D	L	B	PF	PA	PD	Pts
1	Yass United Magpies (W)	15	12	1	2	0	573	126	+447	25
2	Gungahlin Bulls (W)	15	12	0	3	0	493	186	+307	24
3	West Belconnen Warriors (W)	15	9	1	5	0	484	196	+288	19
4	Goulburn City Bulldogs (W)	15	7	1	7	0	285	434	-149	15

Updated to match(es) played on 27 August 2023. Source:
Rules for classification: 1) points; 2) point difference; 3) points scored

==== Ladder progression ====
- Numbers highlighted in green indicate that the team finished the round inside the top 4.
- Numbers highlighted in blue indicates the team finished first on the ladder in that round.

Pos	Team	1	2	3	4	5	6
1	Yass United Magpies (W)	17	19	19	21	23	25
2	Gungahlin Bulls (W)	18	20	22	22	22	24
3	West Belconnen Warriors (W)	13	13	15	17	19	19
4	Goulburn City Bulldogs (W)	15	15	15	15	15	15

=== Katrina Fanning Shield Results ===
==== Round 1 ====
Home	Score	Away	Match Information
Home	Score	Away	Date and Time	Venue	Referee	Video
Goulburn City Bulldogs (W)	24 – 22	West Belconnen Warriors (W)	Saturday, 15 July, 10:40am	Workers Arena	J. Charman
Yass United Magpies (W)	2* – 0	Gungahlin Bulls (W)	Saturday, 15 July, 11:50am	Walker Park	N/A

==== Round 2 ====
Home	Score	Away	Match Information
Home	Score	Away	Date and Time	Venue	Referee	Video
West Belconnen Warriors (W)	10 – 22	Yass United Magpies (W)	Saturday, 22 July, 10:30am	Raiders Belconnen	J. Charman
Gungahlin Bulls (W)	38 – 4	Goulburn City Bulldogs (W)	Saturday, 22 July, 1:00pm	Gungahlin Enclosed Oval	H. Hall

==== Round 3 ====
Home	Score	Away	Match Information
Home	Score	Away	Date and Time	Venue	Referee	Video
Goulburn City Bulldogs (W)	8 – 20	Gungahlin Bulls (W)	Saturday, 5 August, 10:40am	Workers Arena	J. Gould
Yass United Magpies (W)	24 – 28	West Belconnen Warriors (W)	Saturday, 5 August, 11:50am	Walker Park	M. Prpic

==== Round 4 ====
Home	Score	Away	Match Information
Home	Score	Away	Date and Time	Venue	Referee	Video
Goulburn City Bulldogs (W)	4 – 52	Yass United Magpies (W)	Saturday, 12 August, 11:10am	Workers Arena	M. Bayley
Gungahlin Bulls (W)	14 – 46	West Belconnen Warriors (W)	Saturday, 12 August, 1:00pm	Gungahlin Enclosed Oval	K. Nightingale

==== Round 5 ====
Home	Score	Away	Match Information
Home	Score	Away	Date and Time	Venue	Referee	Video
Gungahlin Bulls (W)	12 – 42	Yass United Magpies (W)	Saturday, 19 August, 9:30am	Greenway Oval	D. Wheeler
Goulburn City Bulldogs (W)	0 – 62*	West Belconnen Warriors (W)	Saturday, 19 August, 9:30am	Phillip Oval	N/A

==== Round 6 ====
Home	Score	Away	Match Information
Home	Score	Away	Date and Time	Venue	Referee	Video
West Belconnen Warriors (W)	24 – 52	Gungahlin Bulls (W)	Saturday, 26 August, 9:20am	Raiders Belconnen	J. Bain
Yass United Magpies (W)	56 – 0	Goulburn City Bulldogs (W)	Saturday, 26 August, 11:50am	Walker Park	M. Bayley

=== Finals Series ===
Minor & Major Semi-Finals
1	Yass United	22
2	Gungahlin	6
3	West Belconnen	0
4	Goulburn City	0

Preliminary Final
2	Gungahlin	20
3	West Belconnen	40

Grand Final
1	Yass United	22
3	West Belconnen	24

Home	Score	Away	Match Information
Home	Score	Away	Date and Time	Venue	Referee	Video
Minor & Major Semi-Finals
West Belconnen Warriors (W)	0* – 0	Goulburn City Bulldogs (W)	Saturday, 2 September, 12:00pm	Raiders Belconnen	N/A
Yass United Magpies (W)	22 – 6	Gungahlin Bulls (W)	Sunday, 3 September, 12:00pm	Seears Workwear Oval	J. Severs
Preliminary Final
Gungahlin Bulls (W)	20 – 40	West Belconnen Warriors (W)	Sunday, 10 September, 12:10pm	Raiders Belconnen	M. Prpic
Grand Final
Yass United Magpies (W)	22 – 24	West Belconnen Warriors (W)	Sunday, 17 September, 12:10pm	Seiffert Oval	O. Levido

=== Katrina Fanning Cup Ladder ===
Pos	Team	Pld	W	D	L	B	PF	PA	PD	Pts
1	Queanbeyan United Blues (W)	13	7	1	5	1	362	215	+147	17
2	Harden-Murrumburrah Worhawks	13	6	1	6	1	337	338	-1	15
3	Tuggeranong Valley Bushrangers (W)	13	5	1	7	1	298	230	+68	13
4	Woden Valley Rams (W)	13	5	0	8	1	300	421	-121	12
5	Queanbeyan Kangaroos (W)	12	1	0	11	1	80	717	-637	4

Updated to match(es) played on 13 August 2023. Source:
Rules for classification: 1) points; 2) point difference; 3) points scored

==== Ladder progression ====
- Numbers highlighted in green indicate that the team finished the round inside the top 5.
- Numbers highlighted in blue indicates the team finished first on the ladder in that round.
- Underlined numbers indicate that the team had a bye during that round.

Pos	Team	1	2	3	4	5
1	Queanbeyan United Blues (W)	9	11	13	15	17
2	Harden-Murrumburrah Worhawks	11	13	15	15	15
3	Tuggeranong Valley Bushrangers (W)	7	9	9	11	13
4	Woden Valley Rams (W)	6	6	8	10	12
5	Queanbeyan Kangaroos (W)	4	4	4	4	4

=== Katrina Fanning Cup Results ===
==== Round 1 ====
Home	Score	Away	Match Information
Home	Score	Away	Date and Time	Venue	Referee	Video
Tuggeranong Valley Bushrangers (W)	4 – 14	Queanbeyan United Blues (W)	Saturday, 15 July, 10:30am	Greenway Oval	D. Wheeler
Harden-Murrumburrah Worhawks	38 – 30	Woden Valley Rams (W)	Saturday, 15 July, 12:20pm	McLean Oval	J. Gould
Queanbeyan Kangaroos (W)		BYE

==== Round 2 ====
Home	Score	Away	Match Information
Home	Score	Away	Date and Time	Venue	Referee	Video
Queanbeyan Kangaroos (W)	10 – 64	Harden-Murrumburrah Worhawks	Saturday, 22 July, 10:30am	NSWRL HQ Bruce	C. Nightingale
Queanbeyan United Blues (W)	54 – 4	Woden Valley Rams (W)	Saturday, 22 July, 12:00pm	Seiffert Oval	A. O'Brien
Tuggeranong Valley Bushrangers (W)		BYE

==== Round 3 ====
Home	Score	Away	Match Information
Home	Score	Away	Date and Time	Venue	Referee	Video
Queanbeyan United Blues (W)	54 – 0	Queanbeyan Kangaroos (W)	Saturday, 29 July, 10:30am	Raiders Belconnen	M. Prpic
Woden Valley Rams (W)	32 – 12	Tuggeranong Valley Bushrangers (W)	Saturday, 29 July, 12:00pm	Raiders Belconnen	J. Charman
Harden-Murrumburrah Worhawks		BYE

==== Round 4 ====
Home	Score	Away	Match Information
Home	Score	Away	Date and Time	Venue	Referee	Video
Tuggeranong Valley Bushrangers (W)	62 – 0	Queanbeyan Kangaroos (W)	Saturday, 5 August, 12:00pm	Greenway Oval	G. Doherty
Queanbeyan United Blues (W)	44 – 12	Harden-Murrumburrah Worhawks	Saturday, 5 August, 12:00pm	Seiffert Oval	J. Bain
Woden Valley Rams (W)		BYE

==== Round 5 ====
Home	Score	Away	Match Information
Home	Score	Away	Date and Time	Venue	Referee	Video
Queanbeyan Kangaroos (W)	0 – 62*	Woden Valley Rams (W)	Saturday, 12 August, 11:50am	NSWRL HQ Bruce	N/A
Harden-Murrumburrah Worhawks	22 – 26	Tuggeranong Valley Bushrangers (W)	Saturday, 12 August, 2:00pm	McLean Oval	M. Prpic
Queanbeyan United Blues (W)		BYE

=== Finals Series ===
Qualifying Final
2	Harden-Murrumburrah	38
3	Tuggeranong Valley	6
4	Woden Valley	0
5	Queanbeyan	0

Major Semi-Final
1	Queanbeyan United	12
2	Harden-Murrumburrah	32
Minor Semi-Final
3	Tuggeranong Valley	14
4	Woden Valley	4

Preliminary Final
1	Queanbeyan United	28
3	Tuggeranong Valley	8

Grand Final
2	Harden-Murrumburrah	14
1	Queanbeyan United	32

Home	Score	Away	Match Information
Home	Score	Away	Date and Time	Venue	Referee	Video
Qualifying & Elimination Finals
Harden-Murrumburrah Worhawks	38 – 6	Tuggeranong Valley Bushrangers (W)	Saturday, 19 August, 11:30am	Boorowa Showground	M. Prpic
Woden Valley Rams (W)	0* – 0	Queanbeyan Kangaroos (W)	Saturday, 19 August, 11:30am	McLean Oval	N/A
Minor & Major Semi-Finals
Queanbeyan United Blues (W)	12 – 32	Harden-Murrumburrah Worhawks	Saturday, 26 August, 11:00am	Crookwell Memorial Oval	K. Nightingale
Tuggeranong Valley Bushrangers (W)	14 – 4	Woden Valley Rams (W)	Saturday, 26 August, 11:00am	Mick Sherd Oval	M. Prpic
Preliminary Final
Queanbeyan United Blues (W)	28 – 8	Tuggeranong Valley Bushrangers (W)	Saturday, 2 September, 11:00am	Boorowa Showground	M. Prpic
Grand Final
Harden-Murrumburrah Worhawks	14 – 32	Queanbeyan United Blues (W)	Saturday, 9 September, 10:30am	Crookwell Memorial Oval	J. Severs

== Under 19s ==
=== Teams ===
Colours	Club	Home ground(s)	Head coach
	Goulburn City Bulldogs	Workers Arena	TBA
	Gungahlin Bulls	Gungahlin Enclosed Oval	TBA
	Queanbeyan United Blues	Seiffert Oval	TBA
	Tuggeranong Valley Bushrangers	Greenway Oval	TBA
	West Belconnen Warriors	Raiders Belconnen	TBA
	Woden Valley Rams	Phillip Oval	TBA
	Yass United Magpies	Walker Park	TBA

=== Ladder ===
Pos	Team	Pld	W	D	L	B	PF	PA	PD	Pts
1	Goulburn City Bulldogs (U19s)	12	10	1	1	6	384	102	+282	33
2	Woden Valley Rams (U19s)	12	9	2	1	6	354	178	+176	32
3	West Belconnen Warriors (U19s)	12	6	3	3	6	284	298	–14	27
4	Tuggeranong Valley Bushrangers (U19s)	12	4	1	7	6	196	266	–70	21
5	Gungahlin Bulls (U19s)	12	4	0	8	6	216	236	–20	20
6	Queanbeyan United Blues (U19s)	12	3	0	9	6	176	336	-160	18
7	Yass United Magpies (U19s)	12	2	1	9	6	142	336	–194	17

Updated to match(es) played on 27 August 2023. Source:
Rules for classification: 1) points; 2) point difference; 3) points scored

==== Ladder progression ====
- Numbers highlighted in green indicate that the team finished the round inside the top 4.
- Numbers highlighted in blue indicates the team finished first on the ladder in that round.
- Numbers highlighted in red indicates the team finished last place on the ladder in that round.
- Underlined numbers indicate that the team had a bye during that round.

Pos	Team	1	2	3	4	5	6	7	8	9	10	11	12	13	14	15	16	17	18
1	Goulburn City Bulldogs (U19s)	2	4	4	5	7	9	11	13	15	17	19	21	23	25	27	29	31	33
2	Woden Valley Rams (U19s)	2	4	6	8	10	12	14	16	18	19	21	21	23	25	27	29	30	32
3	West Belconnen Warriors (U19s)	2	2	4	5	7	7	9	11	13	15	17	18	18	20	22	24	25	27
4	Tuggeranong Valley Bushrangers (U19s)	2	2	2	4	6	6	8	10	10	10	10	11	13	15	17	19	21	21
5	Gungahlin Bulls (U19s)	2	4	6	6	6	6	8	8	10	12	12	14	14	14	14	16	18	20
6	Queanbeyan United Blues (U19s)	0	0	2	4	4	6	6	6	8	10	12	14	16	16	16	16	16	18
7	Yass United Magpies (U19s)	0	2	2	4	6	8	8	10	10	11	11	11	13	15	17	17	17	17

=== Season Results ===
==== Round 1 ====
Home	Score	Away	Match Information
Home	Score	Away	Date and Time	Venue	Referee	Video
Yass United Magpies (U19s)	0 – 38	Woden Valley Rams (U19s)	Saturday, 15 April, 12:00pm	Walker Park	B. Munroe
Tuggeranong Valley Bushrangers (U19s)	30 – 4	Queanbeyan United Blues (U19s)	Saturday, 15 April, 12:30pm	Greenway Oval	M. Prpic
Goulburn City Bulldogs (U19s)	BYE	Gungahlin Bulls (U19s)
West Belconnen Warriors (U19s)	BYE

==== Round 2 ====
Home	Score	Away	Match Information
Home	Score	Away	Date and Time	Venue	Referee	Video
Gungahlin Bulls (U19s)	30 – 20	West Belconnen Warriors (U19s)	Saturday, 22 April, 11:45am	Gungahlin Enclosed Oval	M. Prpic
Goulburn City Bulldogs (U19s)	32 – 4	Tuggeranong Valley Bushrangers (U19s)	Saturday, 22 April, 12:00pm	Workers Arena	B. Munroe
Queanbeyan United Blues (U19s)	16 – 22	Yass United Magpies (U19s)	Saturday, 22 April, 1:30pm	Seiffert Oval	J. Bain
Woden Valley Rams (U19s)		BYE

==== Round 3 ====
Home	Score	Away	Match Information
Home	Score	Away	Date and Time	Venue	Referee	Video
Woden Valley Rams (U19s)	16 – 12	Goulburn City Bulldogs (U19s)	Saturday, 29 April, 10:40am	Phillip Oval	M. Prpic
Yass United Magpies (U19s)	14 – 28	Gungahlin Bulls (U19s)	Saturday, 29 April, 12:00pm	Walker Park	M. Bayley
Tuggeranong Valley Bushrangers (U19s)	20 – 32	West Belconnen Warriors (U19s)	Saturday, 29 April, 12:00pm	Greenway Oval	J. Bain
Queanbeyan United Blues (U19s)		BYE

==== Round 4 ====
Home	Score	Away	Match Information
Home	Score	Away	Date and Time	Venue	Referee	Video
Gungahlin Bulls (U19s)	20 – 34	Woden Valley Rams (U19s)	Saturday, 6 May, 11:45am	Gungahlin Enclosed Oval	A. Richardson
West Belconnen Warriors (U19s)	18 – 18	Goulburn City Bulldogs (U19s)	Saturday, 6 May, 12:00pm	Raiders Belconnen	M. Prpic
Yass United Magpies (U19s)	BYE	Queanbeyan United Blues (U19s)
Tuggeranong Valley Bushrangers (U19s)	BYE

==== Round 5 ====
Home	Score	Away	Match Information
Home	Score	Away	Date and Time	Venue	Referee	Video
Tuggeranong Valley Bushrangers (U19s)	22 – 18	Gungahlin Bulls (U19s)	Saturday, 13 May, 12:00pm	Greenway Oval	A. Richardson
Woden Valley Rams (U19s)	50 – 0	Queanbeyan United Blues (U19s)	Saturday, 13 May, 1:30pm	Phillip Oval	T. Brooker
West Belconnen Warriors (U19s)	BYE	Yass United Magpies (U19s)
Goulburn City Bulldogs (U19s)	BYE

==== Round 6 ====
Home	Score	Away	Match Information
Home	Score	Away	Date and Time	Venue	Referee	Video
Yass United Magpies (U19s)	16 – 14	Tuggeranong Valley Bushrangers (U19s)	Saturday, 20 May, 10:30am	Walker Park	M. Bayley
Gungahlin Bulls (U19s)	4 – 20	Queanbeyan United Blues (U19s)	Saturday, 20 May, 12:00pm	Gungahlin Enclosed Oval	J. Severs
West Belconnen Warriors (U19s)	12 – 38	Woden Valley Rams (U19s)	Sunday, 21 May, 10:50am	Raiders Belconnen	M. Prpic
Goulburn City Bulldogs (U19s)		BYE

==== Round 7 ====
Home	Score	Away	Match Information
Home	Score	Away	Date and Time	Venue	Referee	Video
Yass United Magpies (U19s)	12 – 32	West Belconnen Warriors (U19s)	Saturday, 27 May, 10:30am	Walker Park	K. Nightingale
Queanbeyan United Blues (U19s)	6 – 38	Goulburn City Bulldogs (U19s)	Saturday, 27 May, 1:40pm	Seiffert Oval	B. Munroe
Gungahlin Bulls (U19s)	BYE	Woden Valley Rams (U19s)
Tuggeranong Valley Bushrangers (U19s)	BYE

==== Round 8 ====
Home	Score	Away	Match Information
Home	Score	Away	Date and Time	Venue	Referee	Video
Gungahlin Bulls (U19s)	10 – 22	Goulburn City Bulldogs (U19s)	Saturday, 3 June, 11:45am	Gungahlin Enclosed Oval	M. Prpic
West Belconnen Warriors (U19s)	32 – 20	Queanbeyan United Blues (U19s)	Saturday, 3 June, 1:20pm	Raiders Belconnen	J. Bain
Woden Valley Rams (U19s)	BYE	Yass United Magpies (U19s)
Tuggeranong Valley Bushrangers (U19s)	BYE

==== Round 9 ====
Home	Score	Away	Match Information
Home	Score	Away	Date and Time	Venue	Referee	Video
Tuggeranong Valley Bushrangers (U19s)	20 – 22	Woden Valley Rams (U19s)	Saturday, 17 June, 12:00pm	Greenway Oval	M. Bayley
Goulburn City Bulldogs (U19s)	32 – 8	Yass United Magpies (U19s)	Saturday, 17 June, 12:00pm	Workers Arena	J. Severs
Queanbeyan United Blues (U19s)	BYE	West Belconnen Warriors (U19s)
Gungahlin Bulls (U19s)	BYE

==== Round 10 ====
Home	Score	Away	Match Information
Home	Score	Away	Date and Time	Venue	Referee	Video
Woden Valley Rams (U19s)	26 – 26	Yass United Magpies (U19s)	Saturday, 24 June, 11:00am	Phillip Oval	S. Daley
Queanbeyan United Blues (U19s)	22 – 20	Tuggeranong Valley Bushrangers (U19s)	Saturday, 24 June, 1:40pm	Seiffert Oval	A. O'Brien
West Belconnen Warriors (U19s)	BYE	Gungahlin Bulls (U19s)
Goulburn City Bulldogs (U19s)	BYE

==== Round 11 ====
Home	Score	Away	Match Information
Home	Score	Away	Date and Time	Venue	Referee	Video
West Belconnen Warriors (U19s)	18 – 16	Gungahlin Bulls (U19s)	Sunday, 2 July, 10:50am	Raiders Belconnen	A. Richardson
Tuggeranong Valley Bushrangers (U19s)	0 – 46	Goulburn City Bulldogs (U19s)	Sunday, 2 July, 12:00pm	Greenway Oval	K. Nightingale
Yass United Magpies (U19s)	16 – 36	Queanbeyan United Blues (U19s)	Sunday, 2 July, 12:00pm	Walker Park	J. Severs
Woden Valley Rams (U19s)		BYE

==== Round 12 ====
Home	Score	Away	Match Information
Home	Score	Away	Date and Time	Venue	Referee	Video
Gungahlin Bulls (U19s)	18 – 6	Yass United Magpies (U19s)	Saturday, 8 July, 11:40am	Gungahlin Enclosed Oval	D. Wheeler
Goulburn City Bulldogs (U19s)	26 – 4	Woden Valley Rams (U19s)	Saturday, 8 July, 12:10pm	Workers Arena	K. Nightingale
West Belconnen Warriors (U19s)	24 – 24	Tuggeranong Valley Bushrangers (U19s)	Sunday, 9 July, 10:50am	Raiders Belconnen	J. Bain
Queanbeyan United Blues (U19s)		BYE

==== Round 13 ====
Home	Score	Away	Match Information
Home	Score	Away	Date and Time	Venue	Referee	Video
Woden Valley Rams (U19s)	28 – 12	Gungahlin Bulls (U19s)	Saturday, 15 July, 10:50am	Phillip Oval	A. Richardson
Goulburn City Bulldogs (U19s)	60 – 4	West Belconnen Warriors (U19s)	Saturday, 15 July, 12:00pm	Workers Arena	C. Rigby
Queanbeyan United Blues (U19s)	BYE	Tuggeranong Valley Bushrangers (U19s)
Yass United Magpies (U19s)	BYE

==== Round 14 ====
Home	Score	Away	Match Information
Home	Score	Away	Date and Time	Venue	Referee	Video
Gungahlin Bulls (U19s)	14 – 18	Tuggeranong Valley Bushrangers (U19s)	Saturday, 22 July, 11:45am	Gungahlin Enclosed Oval	J. Severs
Queanbeyan United Blues (U19s)	12 – 42	Woden Valley Rams (U19s)	Saturday, 22 July, 1:30pm	Seiffert Oval	G. Doherty
Yass United Magpies (U19s)	BYE	Goulburn City Bulldogs (U19s)
West Belconnen Warriors (U19s)	BYE

==== Round 15 ====
Home	Score	Away	Match Information
Home	Score	Away	Date and Time	Venue	Referee	Video
Goulburn City Bulldogs (U19s)	24 – 20	Gungahlin Bulls (U19s)	Saturday, 5 August, 12:00pm	Workers Arena	J. Black
Queanbeyan United Blues (U19s)	24 – 32	West Belconnen Warriors (U19s)	Saturday, 5 August, 1:30pm	Seiffert Oval	R. Keen
Woden Valley Rams (U19s)	BYE	Yass United Magpies (U19s)
Tuggeranong Valley Bushrangers (U19s)	BYE

==== Round 16 ====
Home	Score	Away	Match Information
Home	Score	Away	Date and Time	Venue	Referee	Video
Goulburn City Bulldogs (U19s)	24 – 6	Queanbeyan United Blues (U19s)	Saturday, 12 August, 12:40pm	Workers Arena	R. Keen
West Belconnen Warriors (U19s)	34 – 10	Yass United Magpies (U19s)	Sunday, 13 August, 12:00pm	Raiders Belconnen	J. Bain
Gungahlin Bulls (U19s)	BYE	Woden Valley Rams (U19s)
Tuggeranong Valley Bushrangers (U19s)	BYE

==== Round 17 ====
Home	Score	Away	Match Information
Home	Score	Away	Date and Time	Venue	Referee	Video
Woden Valley Rams (U19s)	26 – 26	West Belconnen Warriors (U19s)	Saturday, 19 August, 11:00am	Phillip Oval	J. Bain
Tuggeranong Valley Bushrangers (U19s)	12 – 6	Yass United Magpies (U19s)	Saturday, 19 August, 12:00pm	Greenway Oval	M. Bayley
Queanbeyan United Blues (U19s)	10 – 26	Gungahlin Bulls (U19s)	Saturday, 19 August, 1:40pm	Seiffert Oval	R. Keen
Goulburn City Bulldogs (U19s)		BYE

==== Round 18 ====
Home	Score	Away	Match Information
Home	Score	Away	Date and Time	Venue	Referee	Video
Yass United Magpies (U19s)	6 – 50	Goulburn City Bulldogs (U19s)	Saturday, 26 August, 10:30am	Walker Park	J. Black
Woden Valley Rams (U19s)	30 – 12	Tuggeranong Valley Bushrangers (U19s)	Saturday, 26 August, 11:00am	Phillip Oval	R. Keen
Gungahlin Bulls (U19s)	BYE	Queanbeyan United Blues (U19s)
West Belconnen Warriors (U19s)	BYE

=== Finals Series ===
Minor & Major Semi-Finals
1	Goulburn City	10
2	Woden Valley	50
3	West Belconnen	20
4	Tuggeranong Valley	12

Preliminary Final
1	Goulburn City	14
3	West Belconnen	24

Grand Final
2	Woden Valley	42
3	West Belconnen	18

Home	Score	Away	Match Information
Home	Score	Away	Date and Time	Venue	Referee	Video
Minor & Major Semi-Finals
West Belconnen Warriors (U19s)	20 – 12	Tuggeranong Valley Bushrangers (U19s)	Saturday, 2 September, 12:00pm	Raiders Belconnen	T. Brooker
Goulburn City Bulldogs (U19s)	10 – 50	Woden Valley Rams (U19s)	Sunday, 3 September, 10:40am	Seears Workwear Oval	G. Miles
Preliminary Final
Goulburn City Bulldogs (U19s)	14 – 24	West Belconnen Warriors (U19s)	Sunday, 10 September, 10:45am	Raiders Belconnen	T. Brooker
Grand Final
Woden Valley Rams (U19s)	42 – 18	West Belconnen Warriors (U19s)	Sunday, 17 September, 10:45am	Seiffert Oval	T. Brooker

== Canberra Raiders Cup Ladies League Tag ==
=== Teams ===
Colours	Club	Home ground(s)	Head coach
	Belconnen United Sharks	NSWRL HQ Bruce	TBA
	Goulburn City Bulldogs	Workers Arena	TBA
	Gungahlin Bulls	Gungahlin Enclosed Oval	TBA
	Queanbeyan Kangaroos	Seears Workwear Oval	TBA
	Tuggeranong Valley Bushrangers	Greenway Oval	TBA
	West Belconnen Warriors	Raiders Belconnen	TBA
	Woden Valley Rams	Phillip Oval	TBA
	Yass United Magpies	Walker Park	TBA

=== Ladder ===
Pos	Team	Pld	W	D	L	B	PF	PA	PD	Pts
1	Woden Valley Rams (LLT)	14	13	0	1	4	580	64	+516	34
2	Gungahlin Bulls (LLT)	14	11	1	2	4	358	96	+262	31
3	Belconnen United Sharks (LLT)	14	8	3	3	4	256	136	+120	27
4	Goulburn City Bulldogs (LLT)	14	8	1	5	4	374	156	+218	25
5	West Belconnen Warriors (LLT)	14	6	2	6	4	156	206	–50	22
6	Yass United Magpies (LLT)	14	4	1	9	4	102	306	–204	17
7	Tuggeranong Valley Bushrangers (LLT)	14	2	0	12	4	88	370	–282	12
8	Queanbeyan Kangaroos (LLT)	14	0	0	14	4	28	608	–580	8

Updated to match(es) played on 27 August 2023. Source:
Rules for classification: 1) points; 2) point difference; 3) points scored

==== Ladder progression ====
- Numbers highlighted in green indicate that the team finished the round inside the top 4.
- Numbers highlighted in blue indicates the team finished first on the ladder in that round.
- Numbers highlighted in red indicates the team finished last place on the ladder in that round.
- Underlined numbers indicate that the team had a bye during that round.

Pos	Team	1	2	3	4	5	6	7	8	9	10	11	12	13	14	15	16	17	18
1	Woden Valley Rams (LLT)	2	4	6	6	8	10	12	14	16	18	20	22	24	26	28	30	32	34
2	Gungahlin Bulls (LLT)	1	3	5	7	9	11	13	15	17	19	21	23	23	25	25	27	29	31
3	Belconnen United Sharks (LLT)	1	3	5	7	9	11	11	12	13	13	15	17	19	21	23	23	25	27
4	Goulburn City Bulldogs (LLT)	2	4	4	5	5	7	9	9	11	13	15	15	17	17	19	21	23	25
5	West Belconnen Warriors (LLT)	2	2	4	5	7	7	9	11	12	14	14	16	16	18	20	22	22	22
6	Yass United Magpies (LLT)	0	2	2	4	6	8	8	9	9	9	11	11	13	15	15	15	17	17
7	Tuggeranong Valley Bushrangers (LLT)	2	2	2	2	2	2	4	6	6	8	8	8	8	8	10	12	12	12
8	Queanbeyan Kangaroos (LLT)	0	0	2	2	2	2	2	2	4	4	4	6	6	6	6	6	6	8

=== Season Results ===
==== Round 1 ====
Home	Score	Away	Match Information
Home	Score	Away	Date and Time	Venue	Referee	Video
Yass United Magpies (LLT)	6 – 44	Woden Valley Rams (LLT)	Saturday, 15 April, 9:40am	Walker Park	A. Batten
Goulburn City Bulldogs (LLT)	46 – 6	Queanbeyan Kangaroos (LLT)	Saturday, 15 April, 12:00pm	Workers Arena	H. Hall
Gungahlin Bulls (LLT)	8 – 8	Belconnen United Sharks (LLT)	Saturday, 15 April, 12:00pm	Gungahlin Enclosed Oval	M. Lean
West Belconnen Warriors (LLT)	BYE	Tuggeranong Valley Bushrangers (LLT)

==== Round 2 ====
Home	Score	Away	Match Information
Home	Score	Away	Date and Time	Venue	Referee	Video
Gungahlin Bulls (LLT)	42 – 0	West Belconnen Warriors (LLT)	Saturday, 22 April, 10:30am	Gungahlin Enclosed Oval	D. Skinner
Goulburn City Bulldogs (LLT)	36 – 6	Tuggeranong Valley Bushrangers (LLT)	Saturday, 22 April, 10:50am	Workers Arena	W. Perrott
Woden Valley Rams (LLT)	90 – 0	Queanbeyan Kangaroos (LLT)	Saturday, 22 April, 12:00pm	Phillip Oval	J. Charman
Belconnen United Sharks (LLT)	BYE	Yass United Magpies (LLT)

==== Round 3 ====
Home	Score	Away	Match Information
Home	Score	Away	Date and Time	Venue	Referee	Video
Yass United Magpies (LLT)	4 – 28	Gungahlin Bulls (LLT)	Saturday, 29 April, 10:40am	Walker Park	W. Perrott
Tuggeranong Valley Bushrangers (LLT)	0 – 10	West Belconnen Warriors (LLT)	Saturday, 29 April, 10:50am	Greenway Oval	M. Lean
Woden Valley Rams (LLT)	34 – 0	Goulburn City Bulldogs (LLT)	Saturday, 29 April, 12:00pm	Phillip Oval	D. Skinner
Queanbeyan Kangaroos (LLT)	BYE	Belconnen United Sharks (LLT)

==== Round 4 ====
Home	Score	Away	Match Information
Home	Score	Away	Date and Time	Venue	Referee	Video
Gungahlin Bulls (LLT)	22 – 14	Woden Valley Rams (LLT)	Saturday, 6 May, 10:30am	Gungahlin Enclosed Oval	J. Gould
Queanbeyan Kangaroos (LLT)	6 – 42	Yass United Magpies (LLT)	Saturday, 6 May, 10:40am	Seears Workwear Oval	T. Rynehart
Belconnen United Sharks (LLT)	22 – 6	Tuggeranong Valley Bushrangers (LLT)	Saturday, 6 May, 12:00pm	NSWRL HQ Bruce	W. Perrott
West Belconnen Warriors (LLT)	12 – 12	Goulburn City Bulldogs (LLT)	Saturday, 6 May, 12:00pm	Raiders Belconnen	M. Lean

==== Round 5 ====
Home	Score	Away	Match Information
Home	Score	Away	Date and Time	Venue	Referee	Video
Tuggeranong Valley Bushrangers (LLT)	4 – 32	Gungahlin Bulls (LLT)	Saturday, 13 May, 9:30am	Greenway Oval	T. Rynehart
Queanbeyan Kangaroos (LLT)	6 – 38	West Belconnen Warriors (LLT)	Saturday, 13 May, 10:30am	Seears Workwear Oval	M. Prpic
Goulburn City Bulldogs (LLT)	4 – 18	Belconnen United Sharks (LLT)	Saturday, 13 May, 10:50am	Workers Arena	M. Lean
Yass United Magpies (LLT)	BYE	Woden Valley Rams (LLT)

==== Round 6 ====
Home	Score	Away	Match Information
Home	Score	Away	Date and Time	Venue	Referee	Video
Yass United Magpies (LLT)	10 – 0	Tuggeranong Valley Bushrangers (LLT)	Saturday, 20 May, 9:20am	Walker Park	D. O'Donnell
Belconnen United Sharks (LLT)	42 – 0	Queanbeyan Kangaroos (LLT)	Saturday, 20 May, 12:00pm	NSWRL HQ Bruce	M. Lean
West Belconnen Warriors (LLT)	6 – 26	Woden Valley Rams (LLT)	Sunday, 21 May, 12:10pm	Raiders Belconnen	J. Charman
Gungahlin Bulls (LLT)	BYE	Goulburn City Bulldogs (LLT)

==== Round 7 ====
Home	Score	Away	Match Information
Home	Score	Away	Date and Time	Venue	Referee	Video
Yass United Magpies (LLT)	0 – 18	West Belconnen Warriors (LLT)	Saturday, 27 May, 9:20am	Walker Park	M. Lean
Woden Valley Rams (LLT)	34 – 10	Belconnen United Sharks (LLT)	Saturday, 27 May, 12:00pm	Phillip Oval	W. Perrott
Queanbeyan Kangaroos (LLT)	0 – 60	Gungahlin Bulls (LLT)	Saturday, 27 May, 12:00pm	Seears Workwear Oval	D. O'Donnell
Tuggeranong Valley Bushrangers (LLT)	BYE	Goulburn City Bulldogs (LLT)

==== Round 8 ====
Home	Score	Away	Match Information
Home	Score	Away	Date and Time	Venue	Referee	Video
Queanbeyan Kangaroos (LLT)	0 – 36	Tuggeranong Valley Bushrangers (LLT)	Saturday, 3 June, 10:30am	Seears Workwear Oval	T. Rynehart
Belconnen United Sharks (LLT)	4 – 4	Yass United Magpies (LLT)	Saturday, 3 June, 12:00pm	NSWRL HQ Bruce	W. Perrott
Gungahlin Bulls (LLT)	14 – 12	Goulburn City Bulldogs (LLT)	Saturday, 3 June, 1:20pm	Gungahlin Enclosed Oval	A. Batten
Woden Valley Rams (LLT)	BYE	West Belconnen Warriors (LLT)

==== Round 9 ====
Home	Score	Away	Match Information
Home	Score	Away	Date and Time	Venue	Referee	Video
Tuggeranong Valley Bushrangers (LLT)	0 – 52	Woden Valley Rams (LLT)	Saturday, 17 June, 9:30am	Greenway Oval	D. O'Donnell
Goulburn City Bulldogs (LLT)	34 – 0	Yass United Magpies (LLT)	Saturday, 17 June, 9:40am	Workers Arena	T. Herath
Belconnen United Sharks (LLT)	10 – 10	West Belconnen Warriors (LLT)	Saturday, 17 June, 12:00pm	NSWRL HQ Bruce	W. Perrott
Gungahlin Bulls (LLT)	BYE	Queanbeyan Kangaroos (LLT)

==== Round 10 ====
Home	Score	Away	Match Information
Home	Score	Away	Date and Time	Venue	Referee	Video
Belconnen United Sharks (LLT)	0 – 28	Gungahlin Bulls (LLT)	Saturday, 24 June, 12:00pm	NSWRL HQ Bruce	W. Perrott
Woden Valley Rams (LLT)	52 – 0	Yass United Magpies (LLT)	Saturday, 24 June, 12:00pm	Phillip Oval	D. Skinner
Queanbeyan Kangaroos (LLT)	0 – 68	Goulburn City Bulldogs (LLT)	Saturday, 24 June, 12:00pm	Seears Workwear Oval	T. Rynehart
West Belconnen Warriors (LLT)	BYE	Tuggeranong Valley Bushrangers (LLT)

==== Round 11 ====
Home	Score	Away	Match Information
Home	Score	Away	Date and Time	Venue	Referee	Video
Tuggeranong Valley Bushrangers (LLT)	10 – 40	Goulburn City Bulldogs (LLT)	Sunday, 2 July, 9:30am	Greenway Oval	D. Skinner
Queanbeyan Kangaroos (LLT)	0 – 64	Woden Valley Rams (LLT)	Sunday, 2 July, 10:40am	Seears Workwear Oval	M. Lean
West Belconnen Warriors (LLT)	4 – 36	Gungahlin Bulls (LLT)	Sunday, 2 July, 9:30am	Raiders Belconnen	T. Rynehart
Yass United Magpies (LLT)	BYE	Belconnen United Sharks (LLT)

==== Round 12 ====
Home	Score	Away	Match Information
Home	Score	Away	Date and Time	Venue	Referee	Video
Goulburn City Bulldogs (LLT)	12 – 26	Woden Valley Rams (LLT)	Saturday, 8 July, 9:20am	Workers Arena	M. Lean
Gungahlin Bulls (LLT)	30 – 0	Yass United Magpies (LLT)	Saturday, 8 July, 10:30am	Gungahlin Enclosed Oval	T. Rynehart
West Belconnen Warriors (LLT)	26 – 0	Tuggeranong Valley Bushrangers (LLT)	Sunday, 9 July, 12:10pm	Raiders Belconnen	W. Perrott
Queanbeyan Kangaroos (LLT)	BYE	Belconnen United Sharks (LLT)

==== Round 13 ====
Home	Score	Away	Match Information
Home	Score	Away	Date and Time	Venue	Referee	Video
Goulburn City Bulldogs (LLT)	12 – 0	West Belconnen Warriors (LLT)	Saturday, 15 July, 9:30am	Workers Arena	T. Rynehart
Yass United Magpies (LLT)	14 – 0	Queanbeyan Kangaroos (LLT)	Saturday, 15 July, 10:40am	Walker Park	M. Lean
Tuggeranong Valley Bushrangers (LLT)	0 – 36	Belconnen United Sharks (LLT)	Saturday, 15 July, 12:00pm	Greenway Oval	W. Perrott
Woden Valley Rams (LLT)	18 – 4	Gungahlin Bulls (LLT)	Saturday, 15 July, 12:10pm	Phillip Oval	D. Skinner

==== Round 14 ====
Home	Score	Away	Match Information
Home	Score	Away	Date and Time	Venue	Referee	Video
Gungahlin Bulls (LLT)	20 – 4	Tuggeranong Valley Bushrangers (LLT)	Saturday, 22 July, 10:30am	Gungahlin Enclosed Oval	M. Lean
Belconnen United Sharks (LLT)	18 – 10	Goulburn City Bulldogs (LLT)	Saturday, 22 July, 12:00pm	NSWRL HQ Bruce	W. Perrott
West Belconnen Warriors (LLT)	22 – 4	Queanbeyan Kangaroos (LLT)	Saturday, 22 July, 12:00pm	Raiders Belconnen	T. Rynehart
Yass United Magpies (LLT)	BYE	Woden Valley Rams (LLT)

==== Round 15 ====
Home	Score	Away	Match Information
Home	Score	Away	Date and Time	Venue	Referee	Video
Yass United Magpies (LLT)	4 – 16	Belconnen United Sharks (LLT)	Saturday, 5 August, 9:40am	Walker Park	A. Batten
Goulburn City Bulldogs (LLT)	28 – 8	Gungahlin Bulls (LLT)	Saturday, 5 August, 9:40am	Workers Arena	M. Lean
Tuggeranong Valley Bushrangers (LLT)	14 – 6	Queanbeyan Kangaroos (LLT)	Saturday, 5 August, 10:40am	Greenway Oval	T. Rynehart
Woden Valley Rams (LLT)	BYE	West Belconnen Warriors (LLT)

==== Round 16 ====
Home	Score	Away	Match Information
Home	Score	Away	Date and Time	Venue	Referee	Video
Gungahlin Bulls (LLT)	26 – 0	Queanbeyan Kangaroos (LLT)	Saturday, 12 August, 10:30am	Gungahlin Enclosed Oval	A. Batten
Belconnen United Sharks (LLT)	0 – 28	Woden Valley Rams (LLT)	Saturday, 12 August, 12:00pm	NSWRL HQ Bruce	W. Perrott
West Belconnen Warriors (LLT)	10 – 0	Yass United Magpies (LLT)	Sunday, 13 August, 12:00pm	Raiders Belconnen	J. Black
Tuggeranong Valley Bushrangers (LLT)	BYE	Goulburn City Bulldogs (LLT)

==== Round 17 ====
Home	Score	Away	Match Information
Home	Score	Away	Date and Time	Venue	Referee	Video
Tuggeranong Valley Bushrangers (LLT)	4 – 14	Yass United Magpies (LLT)	Saturday, 19 August, 9:30am	Greenway Oval	M. Lean
Queanbeyan Kangaroos (LLT)	0 – 46	Belconnen United Sharks (LLT)	Saturday, 19 August, 10:30am	Seears Workwear Oval	H. Hall
Woden Valley Rams (LLT)	32 – 0	West Belconnen Warriors (LLT)	Saturday, 19 August, 12:00pm	Phillip Oval	W. Perrott
Goulburn City Bulldogs (LLT)	BYE	Gungahlin Bulls (LLT)

==== Round 18 ====
Home	Score	Away	Match Information
Home	Score	Away	Date and Time	Venue	Referee	Video
Yass United Magpies (LLT)	4 – 60	Goulburn City Bulldogs (LLT)	Saturday, 26 August, 9:40am	Walker Park	A. O'Brien
Woden Valley Rams (LLT)	66 – 4	Tuggeranong Valley Bushrangers (LLT)	Saturday, 26 August, 12:00pm	Phillip Oval	W. Perrott
West Belconnen Warriors (LLT)	0 – 26	Belconnen United Sharks (LLT)	Saturday, 26 August, 12:00pm	Raiders Belconnen	M. Lean
Queanbeyan Kangaroos (LLT)	BYE	Gungahlin Bulls (LLT)

=== Finals Series ===
Minor & Major Semi-Finals
1	Woden Valley	22
2	Gungahlin	6
3	Belconnen United	8
4	Goulburn City	12

Preliminary Final
2	Gungahlin	26
4	Goulburn City	14

Grand Final
1	Woden Valley	18
2	Gungahlin	4

Home	Score	Away	Match Information
Home	Score	Away	Date and Time	Venue	Referee	Video
Minor & Major Semi-Finals
Belconnen United Sharks (LLT)	8 – 12	Goulburn City Bulldogs (LLT)	Saturday, 2 September, 10:45am	Raiders Belconnen	W. Perrott
Woden Valley Rams (LLT)	22 – 6	Gungahlin Bulls (LLT)	Sunday, 3 September, 9:30am	Seears Workwear Oval	T. Rynehart
Preliminary Final
Gungahlin Bulls (LLT)	26 – 14	Goulburn City Bulldogs (LLT)	Sunday, 10 September, 9:30am	Raiders Belconnen	W. Perrott
Grand Final
Woden Valley Rams (LLT)	18 – 4	Gungahlin Bulls (LLT)	Sunday, 17 September, 9:15am	Seiffert Oval	W. Perrott

== Second Division Ladies League Tag ==
=== Teams ===
Colours	Club	Home ground(s)	Head coach
	Boorowa Roverettes	Boorowa Showground	TBA
	Bungendore Tigerettes	Mick Sherd Oval	TBA
	Burrangong Bears	Cranfield Oval	TBA
	Cootamundra Bullettes	Les Boyd Oval	TBA
	Crookwell She Devils	Crookwell Memorial Oval	TBA
	Harden-Murrumburrah Hawkettes	McLean Oval	TBA
	North Canberra Bears	Kaleen Enclosed Oval	TBA
	University of Canberra Stars	Raiders Belconnen	TBA

=== Ladder ===
Pos	Team	Pld	W	D	L	B	PF	PA	PS	W%
1	Harden-Murrumburrah Hawkettes	13	12	0	1	3	594	70	89.4	92.3
2	Cootamundra Bullettes	12	11	0	1	4	396	54	88.0	91.6
3	Crookwell She Devils	12	8	0	4	4	326	160	67.0	66.6
4	North Canberra Bears (LLT)	12	6	0	6	4	234	176	57.0	50.0
5	Bungendore Tigerettes	13	6	0	7	3	248	258	49.0	46.1
6	Boorowa Roverettes	12	4	0	8	4	231	216	51.6	33.3
7	University of Canberra Stars (LLT)	12	2	0	10	4	98	296	24.8	16.6
8	Burrangong Bears (LLT)	12	0	0	12	4	0	897	0.0	0.0

Updated to match(es) played on 13 August 2023. Source:
Rules for classification: 1) points; 2) points difference; 3) points scored

==== Ladder Progression ====
- Numbers highlighted in green indicate that the team finished the round inside the top 5.
- Numbers highlighted in blue indicates the team finished first on the ladder in that round.
- Numbers highlighted in red indicates the team finished last place on the ladder in that round.
- Underlined numbers indicate that the team had a bye during that round.

Pos	Team	1	2	3	4	5	6	7	8	9	10	11	12	13	14	15	16
1	Harden-Murrumburrah Hawkettes	100.0	100.0	100.0	100.0	100.0	100.0	100.0	100.0	100.0	100.0	100.0	100.0	100.0	90.9	91.6	92.3
2	Cootamundra Bullettes	0.0	50.0	66.6	75.0	75.5	80.0	83.3	85.7	85.7	87.5	88.8	88.8	88.8	90.0	90.9	91.6
3	Crookwell She Devils	100.0	100.0	50.0	33.3	50.0	60.0	50.0	50.0	57.1	62.5	66.6	60.0	63.6	63.6	63.6	66.6
4	North Canberra Bears (LLT)	100.0	100.0	100.0	75.0	60.0	60.0	50.0	50.0	42.8	37.5	44.4	50.0	54.5	54.5	50.0	50.0
5	Bungendore Tigerettes	0.0	0.0	0.0	0.0	25.0	25.0	40.0	33.3	42.8	37.5	33.3	40.0	36.3	41.6	46.1	46.1
6	Boorowa Roverettes	0.0	50.0	66.6	66.6	50.0	40.0	40.0	50.0	42.8	42.8	37.5	33.3	30.0	36.3	36.3	33.3
7	University of Canberra Stars (LLT)	0.0	0.0	0.0	33.3	25.0	20.0	20.0	16.6	28.5	28.5	25.0	22.2	22.2	20.0	18.1	16.6
8	Burrangong Bears (LLT)	0.0	0.0	0.0	0.0	0.0	0.0	0.0	0.0	0.0	0.0	0.0	0.0	0.0	0.0	0.0	0.0

=== Season Results ===
==== Round 1 ====
Home	Score	Away	Match Information
Home	Score	Away	Date and Time	Venue	Referee	Video
Bungendore Tigerettes	14 – 30	Crookwell She Devils	Saturday, 15 April, 1:00pm	Mick Sherd Oval	T. Herath
North Canberra Bears (LLT)	26 – 4	Boorowa Roverettes	Saturday, 15 April, 1:15pm	Kaleen Enclosed Oval	D. Skinner
Harden-Murrumburrah Hawkettes	26 – 20	Cootamundra Bullettes	Saturday, 15 April, 1:50pm	McLean Oval	L. Richardson
University of Canberra Stars (LLT)	BYE	Burrangong Bears (LLT)

==== Round 2 ====
Home	Score	Away	Match Information
Home	Score	Away	Date and Time	Venue	Referee	Video
Cootamundra Bullettes	84 – 0	Burrangong Bears (LLT)	Friday, 21 April, 6:15pm	Les Boyd Oval	T. Bailey
Bungendore Tigerettes	0 – 30	North Canberra Bears (LLT)	Saturday, 22 April, 1:00pm	Mick Sherd Oval	M. Lean
University of Canberra Stars (LLT)	8 – 20	Boorowa Roverettes	Saturday, 22 April, 1:25pm	Raiders Belconnen	T. Herath
Harden-Murrumburrah Hawkettes	BYE	Crookwell She Devils

==== Round 3 ====
Home	Score	Away	Match Information
Home	Score	Away	Date and Time	Venue	Referee	Video
North Canberra Bears (LLT)	68 – 0	Burrangong Bears (LLT)	Saturday, 29 April, 1:15pm	Kaleen Enclosed Oval	T. Rynehart
Cootamundra Bullettes	26 – 4	Bungendore Tigerettes	Saturday, 29 April, 1:15pm	Les Boyd Oval	D. Charman
Harden-Murrumburrah Hawkettes	30 – 0	University of Canberra Stars (LLT)	Saturday, 29 April, 1:50pm	McLean Oval	J. Severs
Boorowa Roverettes	26 – 12	Crookwell She Devils	Sunday, 30 April, 2:00pm	Boorowa Showground	A. Nightingale

==== Round 4 ====
Home	Score	Away	Match Information
Home	Score	Away	Date and Time	Venue	Referee	Video
Crookwell She Devils	10 – 32	Harden-Murrumburrah Hawkettes	Saturday, 6 May, 12:00pm	Crookwell Memorial Oval	D. Charman
Cootamundra Bullettes	40 – 4	North Canberra Bears (LLT)	Saturday, 6 May, 12:30pm	Les Boyd Oval	TBA
Burrangong Bears (LLT)	0 – 36	University of Canberra Stars (LLT)	Saturday, 6 May, 1:00pm	Cranfield Oval	G. Miles
Bungendore Tigerettes	BYE	Boorowa Roverettes

==== Round 5 ====
Home	Score	Away	Match Information
Home	Score	Away	Date and Time	Venue	Referee	Video
Boorowa Roverettes	4 – 42	Harden-Murrumburrah Hawkettes	Saturday, 20 May, 1:15pm	Boorowa Showground	R. Walters
North Canberra Bears (LLT)	16 – 24	Crookwell She Devils	Saturday, 20 May, 1:15pm	Kaleen Enclosed Oval	T. Rynehart
University of Canberra Stars (LLT)	8 – 22	Bungendore Tigerettes	Saturday, 20 May, 1:25pm	Raiders Belconnen	T. Herath
Burrangong Bears (LLT)	BYE	Cootamundra Bullettes

==== Round 6 ====
Home	Score	Away	Match Information
Home	Score	Away	Date and Time	Venue	Referee	Video
Burrangong Bears (LLT)	0 – 96	Harden-Murrumburrah Hawkettes	Saturday, 27 May, 1:00pm	Cranfield Oval	J. McManus
Crookwell She Devils	30 – 0	University of Canberra Stars (LLT)	Saturday, 27 May, 1:15pm	Crookwell Memorial Oval	T. Brooker
Cootamundra Bullettes	18 – 4	Boorowa Roverettes	Saturday, 27 May, 1:15pm	Les Boyd Oval	H. Fallah
North Canberra Bears (LLT)	BYE	Bungendore Tigerettes

==== Round 7 ====
Home	Score	Away	Match Information
Home	Score	Away	Date and Time	Venue	Referee	Video
Bungendore Tigerettes	64 – 0	Burrangong Bears (LLT)	Saturday, 3 June, 1:00pm	Mick Sherd Oval	D. Skinner
North Canberra Bears (LLT)	10 – 44	Harden-Murrumburrah Hawkettes	Saturday, 3 June, 1:00pm	Kaleen Enclosed Oval	T. Herath
Crookwell She Devils	0 – 20	Cootamundra Bullettes	Sunday, 4 June, 12:45pm	Crookwell Memorial Oval	A. Richardson
Boorowa Roverettes	BYE	University of Canberra Stars (LLT)

==== Round 8 ====
Home	Score	Away	Match Information
Home	Score	Away	Date and Time	Venue	Referee	Video
Harden-Murrumburrah Hawkettes	44 – 0	Bungendore Tigerettes	Saturday, 17 June, 1:00pm	McLean Oval	M. Lean
Boorowa Roverettes	74 – 0	Burrangong Bears (LLT)	Saturday, 17 June, 1:15pm	Boorowa Showground	R. Walters
Cootamundra Bullettes	40 – 4	University of Canberra Stars (LLT)	Saturday, 17 June, 1:15pm	Les Boyd Oval	H. Fallah
Crookwell She Devils	BYE	North Canberra Bears (LLT)

==== Round 9 ====
Home	Score	Away	Match Information
Home	Score	Away	Date and Time	Venue	Referee	Video
Bungendore Tigerettes	20 – 14	Boorowa Roverettes	Saturday, 24 June, 1:00pm	Mick Sherd Oval	A. Batten
Crookwell She Devils	84 – 0	Burrangong Bears (LLT)	Saturday, 24 June, 1:15pm	Crookwell Memorial Oval	D. O'Donnell
North Canberra Bears (LLT)	12 – 20	University of Canberra Stars (LLT)	Saturday, 24 June, 1:15pm	Kaleen Enclosed Oval	T. Herath
Cootamundra Bullettes	BYE	Harden-Murrumburrah Hawkettes

==== Round 10 ====
Home	Score	Away	Match Information
Home	Score	Away	Date and Time	Venue	Referee	Video
Burrangong Bears (LLT)	0 – 76	Cootamundra Bullettes	Saturday, 1 July, 1:00pm	Cranfield Oval	J. Reimer
Bungendore Tigerettes	0 – 56	Harden-Murrumburrah Hawkettes	Saturday, 1 July, 1:45pm	Mick Sherd Oval	W. Perrott
Crookwell She Devils	10 – 8	North Canberra Bears (LLT)	Sunday, 2 July, 1:15pm	Crookwell Memorial Oval	L. Richardson
Boorowa Roverettes	BYE	University of Canberra Stars (LLT)

==== Round 11 ====
Home	Score	Away	Match Information
Home	Score	Away	Date and Time	Venue	Referee	Video
Boorowa Roverettes	0 – 20	Cootamundra Bullettes	Saturday, 8 July, 1:15pm	Boorowa Showground	S. Gay
North Canberra Bears (LLT)	18 – 8	Bungendore Tigerettes	Saturday, 8 July, 1:15pm	Kaleen Enclosed Oval	T. Herath
University of Canberra Stars (LLT)	6 – 12	Crookwell She Devils	Saturday, 8 July, 1:15pm	Raiders Belconnen	A. Batten
Harden-Murrumburrah Hawkettes	BYE	Burrangong Bears (LLT)

==== Round 12 ====
Home	Score	Away	Match Information
Home	Score	Away	Date and Time	Venue	Referee	Video
Boorowa Roverettes	4 – 22	Bungendore Tigerettes	Saturday, 15 July, 1:15pm	Boorowa Showground	D. Charman
University of Canberra Stars (LLT)	4 – 32	North Canberra Bears (LLT)	Saturday, 15 July, 1:15pm	Raiders Belconnen	A. Batten
Harden-Murrumburrah Hawkettes	26 – 12	Crookwell She Devils	Saturday, 15 July, 1:50pm	McLean Oval	J. Gould
Cootamundra Bullettes	BYE	Burrangong Bears (LLT)

==== Round 13 ====
Home	Score	Away	Match Information
Home	Score	Away	Date and Time	Venue	Referee	Video
Boorowa Roverettes	4 – 10	North Canberra Bears (LLT)	Saturday, 22 July, 1:15pm	Boorowa Showground	L. Barrow
Harden-Murrumburrah Hawkettes	108 – 0	Burrangong Bears (LLT)	Saturday, 22 July, 2:30pm	McLean Oval	T. Newham
Crookwell She Devils	20 – 12	Bungendore Tigerettes	Sunday, 23 July, 1:15pm	Crookwell Memorial Oval	H. Fallah
University of Canberra Stars (LLT)	BYE	Cootamundra Bullettes

==== Round 14 ====
Home	Score	Away	Match Information
Home	Score	Away	Date and Time	Venue	Referee	Video
Bungendore Tigerettes	30 – 8	University of Canberra Stars (LLT)	Saturday, 29 July, 1:00pm	Mick Sherd Oval	A. Batten
Cootamundra Bullettes	10 – 8	Harden-Murrumburrah Hawkettes	Saturday, 29 July, 1:15pm	Les Boyd Oval	S. Gay	★
Burrangong Bears (LLT)	0 – 73*	Boorowa Roverettes	Sunday, 30 July, 1:00pm	Cranfield Oval	N/A
North Canberra Bears (LLT)	BYE	Crookwell She Devils

==== Round 15 ====
Home	Score	Away	Match Information
Home	Score	Away	Date and Time	Venue	Referee	Video
Burrangong Bears (LLT)	0 – 52	Bungendore Tigerettes	Saturday, 5 August, 1:00pm	Cranfield Oval	H. Fallah
North Canberra Bears (LLT)	0 – 18	Cootamundra Bullettes	Saturday, 5 August, 1:00pm	Kaleen Enclosed Oval	T. Herath
University of Canberra Stars (LLT)	0 – 44	Harden-Murrumburrah Hawkettes	Saturday, 5 August, 1:25pm	NSWRL HQ Bruce	A. O'Brien
Crookwell She Devils	BYE	Boorowa Roverettes

==== Round 16 ====
Home	Score	Away	Match Information
Home	Score	Away	Date and Time	Venue	Referee	Video
Burrangong Bears (LLT)	0 – 82	Crookwell She Devils	Saturday, 12 August, 1:00pm	Cranfield Oval	J. Black
University of Canberra Stars (LLT)	4 – 24	Cootamundra Bullettes	Saturday, 12 August, 1:25pm	Raiders Belconnen	T. Herath
Harden-Murrumburrah Hawkettes	38 – 4	Boorowa Roverettes	Saturday, 12 August, 3:30pm	McLean Oval	S. Gay
Bungendore Tigerettes	BYE	North Canberra Bears (LLT)

=== Finals Series ===
Qualifying Final
2	Cootamundra	20
3	Crookwell	16
4	North Canberra	16
5	Bungendore	22

Major Semi-Final
1	Harden-Murrumburrah	36
2	Cootamundra	0
Minor Semi-Final
3	Crookwell	10
5	Bungendore	4

Preliminary Final
2	Cootamundra	30
3	Crookwell	0

Grand Final
1	Harden-Murrumburrah	10
2	Cootamundra	0

Home	Score	Away	Match Information
Home	Score	Away	Date and Time	Venue	Referee	Video
Qualifying & Elimination Finals
North Canberra Bears (LLT)	16 – 22	Bungendore Tigerettes	Saturday, 19 August, 12:45pm	McLean Oval	A. Batten
Cootamundra Bullettes	20 – 16	Crookwell She Devils	Saturday, 19 August, 1:15pm	Boorowa Showground	T. Rynehart
Minor & Major Semi-Finals
Harden-Murrumburrah Hawkettes	36 – 0	Cootamundra Bullettes	Saturday, 26 August, 12:50pm	Crookwell Memorial Oval	T. Rynehart
Crookwell She Devils	10 – 4	Bungendore Tigerettes	Saturday, 26 August, 12:50pm	Mick Sherd Oval	A. Batten
Preliminary Final
Cootamundra Bullettes	30 – 0	Crookwell She Devils	Saturday, 2 September, 12:50pm	Boorowa Showground	A. Batten
Grand Final
Harden-Murrumburrah Hawkettes	10 – 0	Cootamundra Bullettes	Saturday, 9 September, 12:50pm	Crookwell Memorial Oval	A. Batten	★
