= 2019 Canberra Rugby League =

Rugby League competition in Canberra, Australia

2019 Canberra Rugby League describes the events and results of the 2019 Canberra Rugby League of rugby in Australia in 2019.

== Canberra Raiders Cup (First Grade) ==
The 2019 Canberra Raiders Cup was the 22nd season of the cup, the top division Rugby League club competition in Canberra. The 2019 Canberra Raiders Cup consisted of 18 regular season rounds from the 7th of April until the 18th of August. There were 3 playoff rounds, beginning on the 24th of August with the first semi-final, and ending on the 8th of September with the grand final. Woden Valley Rams were the defending premiers.

=== Teams ===
2019 Canberra Raiders Cup
- Duration: 7 April 2019 – 8 September 2019
- Teams: 9
- Premiers: Queanbeyan United Blues (25th title)
- Minor premiers: Queanbeyan United Blues
- Wooden spoon: Yass Magpies
- Broadcast partners: Bar TV Sports
- Top points scorer: Christopher Hart (184)
- Player of the year: Mitchell Cornish
- Top try-scorer: Steven Cummins (19)

There will be 9 teams playing in 2019. 5 teams from Canberra, 2 from Queanbeyan, 1 from Yass, and 1 from Goulburn.

All 9 clubs will field a team in the reserve grade competition.

Colours	Team	Home Ground	Coach
	Belconnen United Sharks	O'Connor Oval	Scott Logan
	Goulburn Workers Bulldogs	Workers Arena	Adam Kyle
	Gungahlin Bulls	Gungahlin Enclosed Oval	David Howell
	Queanbeyan United Blues	Seiffert Oval	Terry Campese
	Queanbeyan Kangaroos	Seears Workwear Oval	Aaron Gorrell
	Tuggeranong Bushrangers	Greenway Oval	Jarred Teka
	West Belconnen Warriors	Raiders Belconnen	Adam Peters
	Woden Valley Rams	Phillip District Oval	Lincoln Withers
	Yass Magpies	Walker Park	Cameron Hardy

=== Ladder ===
Pos	Team	Pld	W	D	L	PF	PA	PD	Pts
1	Queanbeyan United Blues	16	11	2	3	508	326	+182	28
2	Tuggeranong Bushrangers	16	11	1	4	422	346	+76	27
3	Goulburn Workers Bulldogs	16	11	0	5	667	274	+393	26
4	Queanbeyan Kangaroos	16	10	1	5	486	303	+183	25
5	West Belconnen Warriors	16	9	0	7	455	340	+115	22
6	Woden Valley Rams	16	7	0	9	319	393	−74	18
7	Belconnen United Sharks	16	6	0	10	359	420	−61	16
8	Gungahlin Bulls	16	3	0	13	228	662	−434	10
9	Yass Magpies	16	2	0	14	206	561	−355	8

Updated to match(es) played on 18 August 2019. Source:
Rules for classification: 1) points; 2) point difference; 3) points scored

==== Ladder progression ====
- Numbers highlighted in green indicate that the team finished the round inside the top 4.
- Numbers highlighted in blue indicates the team finished first on the ladder in that round.
- Numbers highlighted in red indicates the team finished last place on the ladder in that round.
- Underlined numbers indicate that the team had a bye during that round.

Pos	Team	1	2	3	4	5	6	7	8	9	10	11	12	13	14	15	16	17	18
1	Queanbeyan United Blues	2	3	5	7	9	9	9	10	12	14	16	16	18	20	22	24	26	28
2	Tuggeranong Bushrangers	2	4	6	8	10	10	12	13	15	15	17	19	21	23	25	27	27	27
3	Goulburn Workers Bulldogs	2	4	6	6	8	8	10	12	14	14	14	16	18	20	22	22	24	26
4	Queanbeyan Kangaroos	0	1	1	3	3	5	7	9	9	11	13	15	17	19	19	21	23	25
5	West Belconnen Warriors	0	2	4	4	6	8	8	8	10	12	12	14	14	14	16	18	20	22
6	Woden Valley Rams	2	4	4	4	6	8	10	12	12	14	16	16	16	16	16	18	18	18
7	Belconnen United Sharks	0	0	0	2	2	4	6	6	8	8	10	10	12	12	14	14	16	16
8	Gungahlin Bulls	2	2	2	4	4	6	6	6	6	8	8	8	8	10	10	10	10	10
9	Yass Magpies	0	0	2	2	2	2	2	4	4	4	4	6	6	6	6	6	6	8

=== Round 1 ===
Home	Score	Away	Match Information
Home	Score	Away	Date and Time	Venue	Referee
Goulburn Workers Bulldogs	34 – 14	Queanbeyan Kangaroos	Sunday, 7 April 2:15pm	Workers Arena	B. Seppala
Tuggeranong Bushrangers	32 – 22	West Belconnen Warriors	Sunday, 7 April 3:00pm	Greenway Oval	J. Gould
Woden Valley Rams	33 – 16	Yass Magpies	Sunday, 7 April 3:00pm	Phillip District Oval	F. Aiono-Fatu
Queanbeyan United Blues	50 – 12	Belconnen United Sharks	Sunday, 7 April 3:00pm	Seiffert Oval	A. Wheeler
Gungahlin Bulls		BYE

=== Round 2 ===
Home	Score	Away	Match Information
Home	Score	Away	Date and Time	Venue	Referee
Gungahlin Bulls	18 – 60	West Belconnen Warriors	Saturday, 13 April 3:00pm	Gungahlin Enclosed Oval	J. Gould
Belconnen United Sharks	10 – 26	Woden Valley Rams	Saturday, 13 April 3:00pm	O'Connor Oval	F. Aiono-Fatu
Queanbeyan United Blues	28 – 28	Queanbeyan Kangaroos	Saturday, 13 April 3:00pm	Seiffert Oval	A. Wheeler
Goulburn Workers Bulldogs	56 – 12	Yass Magpies	Sunday, 14 April 2:15pm	Workers Arena	L. Barrow
Tuggeranong Bushrangers		BYE

=== Round 3 ===
Home	Score	Away	Match Information
Home	Score	Away	Date and Time	Venue	Referee
Belconnen United Sharks	24 – 26	Tuggeranong Bushrangers	Saturday, 27 April 3:00pm	O'Connor Oval	H. Fallah
Woden Valley Rams	24 – 44	Goulburn Workers Bulldogs	Saturday, 27 April 3:00pm	Phillip District Oval	A. Wheeler
Queanbeyan Kangaroos	30 – 32	West Belconnen Warriors	Saturday, 27 April 3:00pm	Seears Workwear Oval	L. Barrow
Yass Magpies	48 – 14	Gungahlin Bulls	Saturday, 27 April 3:00pm	Walker Park	J. Wharehinga
Queanbeyan United Blues		BYE

=== Round 4 ===
Home	Score	Away	Match Information
Home	Score	Away	Date and Time	Venue	Referee
Tuggeranong Bushrangers	24 – 18	Goulburn Workers Bulldogs	Saturday, 4 May 3:00pm	Greenway Oval	A. Wheeler
Gungahlin Bulls	24 – 22	Woden Valley Rams	Saturday, 4 May 3:00pm	Gungahlin Enclosed Oval	J. Charman
Queanbeyan Kangaroos	54 – 10	Yass Magpies	Saturday, 4 May 3:00pm	Seears Workwear Oval	J. Gould
West Belconnen Warriors	22 – 42	Queanbeyan United Blues	Sunday, 5 May 3:00pm	Raiders Belconnen	B. Seppala
Belconnen United Sharks		BYE

=== Round 5 ===
Home	Score	Away	Match Information
Home	Score	Away	Date and Time	Venue	Referee
Tuggeranong Bushrangers	26 – 6	Gungahlin Bulls	Saturday, 11 May 2:00pm	Greenway Oval	J. Gould
Goulburn Workers Bulldogs	60 – 20	Belconnen United Sharks	Saturday, 11 May 2:15pm	Workers Arena	J. Charman
Woden Valley Rams	24 – 22	Queanbeyan Kangaroos	Saturday, 11 May 3:00pm	Phillip District Oval	A. Wheeler
Queanbeyan United Blues	60 – 10	Yass Magpies	Saturday, 11 May 3:00pm	Seiffert Oval	F. Aiono-Fatu
West Belconnen Warriors		BYE

=== Round 6 ===
Home	Score	Away	Match Information
Home	Score	Away	Date and Time	Venue	Referee
Tuggeranong Bushrangers	18 – 26	Woden Valley Rams	Saturday, 18 May 3:00pm	Greenway Oval	J. Gould
Belconnen United Sharks	18 – 6	Yass Magpies	Saturday, 18 May 3:00pm	O'Connor Oval	J. Charman
West Belconnen Warriors	38 – 22	Goulburn Workers Bulldogs	Saturday, 18 May 3:00pm	Raiders Belconnen	F. Aiono-Fatu
Gungahlin Bulls	24 – 22	Queanbeyan United Blues	Sunday, 19 May 3:00pm	Gungahlin Enclosed Oval	L. Barrow
Queanbeyan Kangaroos		BYE

=== Round 7 ===
Home	Score	Away	Match Information
Home	Score	Away	Date and Time	Venue	Referee
Goulburn Workers Bulldogs	36 – 24	Queanbeyan United Blues	Sunday, 27 May 2:15pm	Workers Arena	A. Wheeler
West Belconnen Warriors	12 – 26	Belconnen United Sharks	Sunday, 27 May 3:00pm	Raiders Belconnen	H. Fallah
Queanbeyan Kangaroos	52 – 10	Gungahlin Bulls	Sunday, 27 May 3:00pm	Seears Workwear Oval	J. Gould
Yass Magpies	16 – 28	Tuggeranong Bushrangers	Sunday, 27 May 3:00pm	Walker Park	F. Aiono-Fatu
Woden Valley Rams		BYE

=== Round 8 ===
Home	Score	Away	Match Information
Home	Score	Away	Date and Time	Venue	Referee
Gungahlin Bulls	4 – 56	Goulburn Workers Bulldogs	Saturday, 1 June 3:00pm	Gungahlin Enclosed Oval	J. Gould
Belconnen United Sharks	21 – 22	Queanbeyan Kangaroos	Saturday, 1 June 3:00pm	O'Connor Oval	J. Charman
Woden Valley Rams	12 – 8	West Belconnen Warriors	Saturday, 1 June 3:00pm	Phillip District Oval	A. Wheeler
Queanbeyan United Blues	34 – 34	Tuggeranong Bushrangers	Saturday, 1 June 3:30pm	Seiffert Oval	B. Seppala
Yass Magpies		BYE

=== Round 9 ===
Home	Score	Away	Match Information
Home	Score	Away	Date and Time	Venue	Referee
Tuggeranong Bushrangers	28 – 16	Queanbeyan Kangaroos	Saturday, 15 June 2:00pm	Greenway Oval	J. Gould
Gungahlin Bulls	28 – 44	Belconnen United Sharks	Saturday, 15 June 3:00pm	Gungahlin Enclosed Oval	F. Aiono-Fatu
Queanbeyan United Blues	24 – 16	Woden Valley Rams	Saturday, 15 June 3:00pm	Seiffert Oval	B. Seppala
West Belconnen Warriors	30 – 12	Yass Magpies	Saturday, 15 June 3:00pm	Raiders Belconnen	A. Wheeler
Goulburn Workers Bulldogs		BYE

=== Round 10 ===
Home	Score	Away	Match Information
Home	Score	Away	Date and Time	Venue	Referee
Belconnen United Sharks	10 – 34	Queanbeyan United Blues	Saturday, 22 June 3:00pm	O'Connor Oval	J. Gould
Queanbeyan Kangaroos	18 – 14	Goulburn Workers Bulldogs	Saturday, 22 June 3:00pm	Seears Workwear Oval	L. Barrow
Yass Magpies	14 – 24	Woden Valley Rams	Saturday, 22 June 3:00pm	Walker Park	F. Aiono-Fatu
West Belconnen Warriors	46 – 10	Tuggeranong Bushrangers	Sunday, 23 June 2:00pm	Raiders Belconnen	A. Nightingale
Gungahlin Bulls		BYE

=== Round 11 ===
Home	Score	Away	Match Information
Home	Score	Away	Date and Time	Venue	Referee
Woden Valley Rams	48 – 10	Gungahlin Bulls	Saturday, 29 June 3:00pm	Phillip District Oval	L. Barrow
Queanbeyan United Blues	16 – 12	West Belconnen Warriors	Saturday, 29 June 3:00pm	Seiffert Oval	A. Nightingale
Yass Magpies	0 – 10	Queanbeyan Kangaroos	Saturday, 29 June 3:00pm	Walker Park	E. Bayliss
Goulburn Workers Bulldogs	20 – 24	Tuggeranong Bushrangers	Sunday, 30 June 2:15pm	Workers Arena	A. Wheeler
Belconnen United Sharks		BYE

=== Round 12 ===
Home	Score	Away	Match Information
Home	Score	Away	Date and Time	Venue	Referee
Gungahlin Bulls	24 – 26	Tuggeranong Bushrangers	Saturday, 6 July 3:00pm	Gungahlin Enclosed Oval	L. Barrow
Belconnen United Sharks	6 – 34	Goulburn Workers Bulldogs	Saturday, 6 July 3:00pm	O'Connor Oval	A. Nightingale
Queanbeyan Kangaroos	38 – 16	Woden Valley Rams	Saturday, 6 July 3:00pm	Seears Workwear Oval	B. McIntosh
Yass Magpies	36 – 32	Queanbeyan United Blues	Saturday, 6 July 3:00pm	Walker Park	F. Aiono-Fatu
West Belconnen Warriors		BYE

=== Round 13 ===
Home	Score	Away	Match Information
Home	Score	Away	Date and Time	Venue	Referee
Yass Magpies	0 – 38	Belconnen United Sharks	Saturday, 13 July 2:00pm	Walker Park	A. Wheeler
Woden Valley Rams	6 – 28	Tuggeranong Bushrangers	Saturday, 13 July 3:00pm	Phillip District Oval	E. Bayliss
Queanbeyan United Blues	30 – 16	Gungahlin Bulls	Saturday, 13 July 3:00pm	Seiffert Oval	J. Gould
Goulburn Workers Bulldogs	56 – 16	West Belconnen Warriors	Sunday, 14 July 2:15pm	Workers Arena	A. Nightingale
Queanbeyan Kangaroos		BYE

=== Round 14 ===
Home	Score	Away	Match Information
Home	Score	Away	Date and Time	Venue	Referee
Tuggeranong Bushrangers	44 – 18	Belconnen United Sharks	Saturday, 20 July 2:00pm	Greenway Oval	F. Aiono-Fatu
Gungahlin Bulls	34 – 6	Yass Magpies	Saturday, 20 July 2:00pm	Gungahlin Enclosed Oval	L. Barrow
Goulburn Workers Bulldogs	49 – 6	Woden Valley Rams	Saturday, 20 July 2:00pm	Workers Arena	A. Wheeler
West Belconnen Warriors	26 – 32	Queanbeyan Kangaroos	Sunday, 21 July 3:00pm	Raiders Belconnen	A. Nightingale
Queanbeyan United Blues		BYE

=== Round 15 ===
Home	Score	Away	Match Information
Home	Score	Away	Date and Time	Venue	Referee
West Belconnen Warriors	48 – 10	Gungahlin Bulls	Saturday, 27 July 2:15pm	Raiders Belconnen	F. Aiono-Fatu
Queanbeyan Kangaroos	16 – 28	Queanbeyan United Blues	Saturday, 27 July 3:00pm	Seears Workwear Oval	E. Bayliss
Yass Magpies	10 – 62	Goulburn Workers Bulldogs	Saturday, 27 July 3:30pm	Walker Park	J. Gould
Woden Valley Rams	18 – 22	Belconnen United Sharks	Sunday, 28 July 3:00pm	Phillip District Oval	A. Wheeler
Tuggeranong Bushrangers		BYE

=== Round 16 ===
Home	Score	Away	Match Information
Home	Score	Away	Date and Time	Venue	Referee
Gungahlin Bulls	0 – 54	Queanbeyan Kangaroos	Saturday, 3 August 2:00pm	Gungahlin Enclosed Oval	J. Gould
Tuggeranong Bushrangers	46 – 4	Yass Magpies	Saturday, 3 August 3:00pm	Greenway Oval	F. Aiono-Fatu
Belconnen United Sharks	10 – 24	West Belconnen Warriors	Saturday, 3 August 3:00pm	O'Connor Oval	E. Bayliss
Queanbeyan United Blues	34 – 26	Goulburn Workers Bulldogs	Saturday, 3 August 3:00pm	Seiffert Oval	A. Nightingale
Woden Valley Rams		BYE

=== Round 17 ===
Home	Score	Away	Match Information
Home	Score	Away	Date and Time	Venue	Referee
Woden Valley Rams	12 – 28	Queanbeyan United Blues	Saturday, 10 August 3:00pm	Phillip District Oval	J. Charman
Belconnen United Sharks	40 – 8	Gungahlin Bulls	Saturday, 10 August 3:00pm	Raiders Belconnen	A. Nightingale
Queanbeyan Kangaroos	44 – 12	Tuggeranong Bushrangers	Saturday, 10 August 3:00pm	Seears Workwear Oval	E. Bayliss
Yass Magpies	6 – 21	West Belconnen Warriors	Saturday, 10 August 3:00pm	Walker Park	A. Wheeler
Goulburn Workers Bulldogs		BYE

=== Round 18 ===
Home	Score	Away	Match Information
Home	Score	Away	Date and Time	Venue	Referee
Tuggeranong Bushrangers	16 – 22	Queanbeyan United Blues	Saturday, 17 August 3:00pm	Greenway Oval	E. Bayliss
West Belconnen Warriors	38 – 6	Woden Valley Rams	Saturday, 17 August 3:00pm	Raiders Belconnen	A. Wheeler
Queanbeyan Kangaroos	28 – 20	Belconnen United Sharks	Saturday, 17 August 3:00pm	Seears Workwear Oval	J. Gould
Goulburn Workers Bulldogs	80 – 0	Gungahlin Bulls	Sunday, 18 August 2:15pm	Workers Arena	A. Nightingale
Yass Magpies		BYE

=== Finals series ===
Minor and major semi-finals
1	Queanbeyan United	32
2	Tuggeranong	18
3	Goulburn Workers	42
4	Queanbeyan	12

Preliminary final
2	Tuggeranong	4
3	Goulburn Workers	42

Grand final
1	Queanbeyan United	34
3	Goulburn Workers	14

Home	Score	Away	Match Information
Home	Score	Away	Date and Time	Venue	Referee
Minor and major semi-finals
Goulburn Workers Bulldogs	42 – 12	Queanbeyan Kangaroos	Saturday, 24 August 3:00pm	Workers Arena	E. Bayliss
Queanbeyan United Blues	32 – 18	Tuggeranong Bushrangers	Sunday, 25 August 1:50pm	Seiffert Oval	A. Wheeler
Preliminary final
Tuggeranong Bushrangers	4 – 42	Goulburn Workers Bulldogs	Sunday, 1 September 3:00pm	Gungahlin Enclosed Oval	A. Wheeler
Grand final
Queanbeyan United Blues	34 – 14	Goulburn Workers Bulldogs	Sunday, 8 September 3:00pm	Seiffert Oval	A. Wheeler

== George Tooke Shield (Second Division) ==
=== Teams ===
There will be 9 teams playing in 2019. 3 teams from Canberra. 6 teams from New South Wales towns surrounding Canberra.

2019 George Tooke Shield
- Duration: 6 April 2019 – 14 September 2018
- Teams: 9
- Premiers: North Canberra Bears (3rd title)
- Minor premiers: North Canberra Bears
- Wooden spoon: Gunning Roos
- Broadcast partners: Bar TV Sports
- Top points scorer: Zach Smith (163)
- Player of the year: Christopher Thorley
- Top try-scorer: Christopher Thorley (15)

Colours	Team	Home Ground	Coach
	Binalong Brahmans	Binalong Recreation Ground	Nathan Lallard
	Boomanulla Raiders	Keith Tournier Oval Boomanulla Oval	Simon Morgan
	Boorowa Rovers	Boorowa Showground	Andrew Burns
	Bungendore Tigers	Mick Sherd Oval	Zach Smith
	Crookwell Green Devils	Crookwell Memorial Oval	Simon Smith
	Gunning Roos	Gunning Showground	Marty Smith Damian McNamara
	Harden Hawks	McLean Oval	Anthony Giannasca
	North Canberra Bears	Jamison Oval	Brian Hogan
	UC Grizzlies	Raiders Belconnen	Matthew Cox

=== Ladder ===
Pos	Team	Pld	W	D	L	PF	PA	PD	Pts
1	North Canberra Bears	16	14	0	2	498	148	+350	32
2	Bungendore Tigers	16	13	0	3	491	218	+273	30
3	Harden Hawks	16	10	0	6	490	241	+249	24
4	Boorowa Rovers	16	10	0	6	366	265	+101	24
5	Crookwell Green Devils	16	9	0	7	432	244	+188	22
6	Binalong Brahmans	16	9	0	7	343	289	+54	22
7	Boomanulla Raiders	16	4	0	12	218	560	−342	12
8	UC Grizzlies	16	2	0	14	203	467	−264	8
9	Gunning Roos	16	1	0	15	77	690	−613	6

Updated to match(es) played on 18 August 2019. Source:
Rules for classification: 1) points; 2) point difference; 3) points scored

==== Ladder progression ====
- Numbers highlighted in green indicate that the team finished the round inside the top 5.
- Numbers highlighted in blue indicates the team finished first on the ladder in that round.
- Numbers highlighted in red indicates the team finished last place on the ladder in that round.
- Underlined numbers indicate that the team had a bye during that round.

Pos	Team	1	2	3	4	5	6	7	8	9	10	11	12	13	14	15	16	17	18
1	North Canberra Bears	2	4	4	6	8	10	12	14	16	18	20	22	24	26	28	28	30	32
2	Bungendore Tigers	2	4	6	8	10	12	12	14	16	18	20	22	24	24	24	26	28	30
3	Harden Hawks	2	4	6	8	10	10	12	12	14	16	18	20	22	22	24	24	24	24
4	Boorowa Rovers	2	4	4	6	8	10	12	12	12	14	16	18	20	22	22	22	22	24
5	Crookwell Green Devils	0	0	2	4	4	4	6	8	10	10	12	12	12	14	16	18	20	22
6	Binalong Brahmans	2	2	4	4	6	8	8	10	10	10	10	12	14	16	18	20	22	22
7	Boomanulla Raiders	0	2	2	2	2	2	4	4	6	8	8	8	8	8	8	10	10	12
8	UC Grizzlies	0	0	2	2	2	4	4	4	4	4	4	4	4	4	6	8	8	8
9	Gunning Roos	0	0	0	0	0	0	0	2	2	2	2	2	2	4	4	4	6	6

=== Round 1 ===
Home	Score	Away	Match Information
Home	Score	Away	Date and Time	Venue	Referee
Gunning Roos	4 – 66	Harden Hawks	Saturday, 6 April 2:00pm	Gunning Showground	J. Wharehinga
Boomanulla Raiders	12 – 34	Binalong Brahmans	Saturday, 6 April 2:00pm	Keith Tournier Oval	G. Doherty
Bungendore Tigers	16 – 14	Crookwell Green Devils	Saturday, 6 April 2:00pm	Mick Sherd Oval	E. Fernance
Boorowa Rovers	40 – 0	UC Grizzlies	Saturday, 6 April 4:00pm	Boorowa Showground	G. Widdowson
North Canberra Bears		BYE

=== Round 2 ===
Home	Score	Away	Match Information
Home	Score	Away	Date and Time	Venue	Referee
Harden Hawks	52 – 0	Binalong Brahmans	Friday, 12 April 8:15pm	McLean Oval	G. Widdowson
Boomanulla Raiders	20 – 10	UC Grizzlies	Saturday, 13 April 2:00pm	Keith Tournier Oval	M. Ryan
North Canberra Bears	20 – 6	Crookwell Green Devils	Saturday, 13 April 2:45pm	Jamison Oval	A. McEnaney
Boorowa Rovers	44 – 14	Gunning Roos	Saturday, 13 April 3:00pm	Boorowa Showground	G. Widdowson
Bungendore Tigers		BYE

=== Round 3 ===
Home	Score	Away	Match Information
Home	Score	Away	Date and Time	Venue	Referee
Boomanulla Raiders	14 – 32	Crookwell Green Devils	Saturday, 27 April 2:00pm	Keith Tournier Oval	A. McEnaney
Bungendore Tigers	46 – 6	Boorowa Rovers	Saturday, 27 April 2:00pm	Mick Sherd Oval	J. Tennent
UC Grizzlies	40 – 4	Gunning Roos	Saturday, 27 April 2:00pm	Raiders Belconnen	J. West
Harden Hawks	20 – 18	North Canberra Bears	Saturday, 27 April 3:30pm	McLean Oval	G. Widdowson
Binalong Brahmans		BYE

=== Round 4 ===
Home	Score	Away	Match Information
Home	Score	Away	Date and Time	Venue	Referee
UC Grizzlies	6 – 50	Bungendore Tigers	Saturday, 4 May 2:00pm	Raiders Belconnen	G. Doherty
North Canberra Bears	28 – 6	Binalong Brahmans	Saturday, 4 May 2:45pm	Jamison Oval	J. Tennent
Harden Hawks	40 – 10	Boomanulla Raiders	Saturday, 4 May 2:45pm	McLean Oval	G. Widdowson
Gunning Roos	0 – 62	Crookwell Green Devils	Sunday, 5 May 2:00pm	Gunning Showground	J. Wharehinga
Boorowa Rovers		BYE

=== Round 5 ===
Home	Score	Away	Match Information
Home	Score	Away	Date and Time	Venue	Referee
Binalong Brahmans	22 – 16	Crookwell Green Devils	Saturday, 11 May 2:00pm	Binalong Recreation Ground	G. Widdowson
Boorowa Rovers	40 – 4	Boomanulla Raiders	Saturday, 11 May 2:00pm	Boorowa Showground	G. Taylor
Bungendore Tigers	56 – 10	Gunning Roos	Saturday, 11 May 2:00pm	Mick Sherd Oval	J. Tennent
UC Grizzlies	10 – 42	North Canberra Bears	Saturday, 11 May 2:00pm	Raiders Belconnen	J. West
Harden Hawks		BYE

=== Round 6 ===
Home	Score	Away	Match Information
Home	Score	Away	Date and Time	Venue	Referee
Boorowa Rovers	22 – 16	Crookwell Green Devils	Saturday, 18 May 2:00pm	Boorowa Showground	A. O'Brien
Gunning Roos	10 – 36	Binalong Brahmans	Saturday, 18 May 2:00pm	Gunning Showground	J. Wharehinga
North Canberra Bears	50 – 0	Boomanulla Raiders	Saturday, 18 May 2:45pm	Jamison Oval	J. Tennent
Harden Hawks	16 – 24	Bungendore Tigers	Saturday, 18 May 3:30pm	McLean Oval	G. Widdowson
UC Grizzlies		BYE

=== Round 7 ===
Home	Score	Away	Match Information
Home	Score	Away	Date and Time	Venue	Referee
Binalong Brahmans	12 – 14	Boorowa Rovers	Saturday, 25 May 2:00pm	Binalong Recreation Ground	G. Widdowson
Boomanulla Raiders	46 – 6	Gunning Roos	Saturday, 25 May 2:00pm	Boomanulla Oval	G. Taylor
Bungendore Tigers	6 – 20	North Canberra Bears	Saturday, 25 May 2:00pm	Mick Sherd Oval	J. Tennent
UC Grizzlies	12 – 42	Harden Hawks	Saturday, 25 May 2:00pm	Raiders Belconnen	J. Wharehinga
Crookwell Green Devils		BYE

=== Round 8 ===
Home	Score	Away	Match Information
Home	Score	Away	Date and Time	Venue	Referee
Binalong Brahmans	26 – 12	UC Grizzlies	Saturday, 1 June 2:00pm	Binalong Recreation Ground	J. Wharehinga
Boomanulla Raiders	14 – 42	Bungendore Tigers	Saturday, 1 June 2:00pm	Boomanulla Oval	G. Taylor
Crookwell Green Devils	26 – 12	Harden Hawks	Saturday, 1 June 2:30pm	Crookwell Memorial Oval	G. Widdowson
North Canberra Bears	12 – 10	Boorowa Rovers	Saturday, 1 June 2:45pm	Jamison Oval	J. Tennent
Gunning Roos		BYE

=== Round 9 ===
Home	Score	Away	Match Information
Home	Score	Away	Date and Time	Venue	Referee
Boorowa Rovers	16 – 28	Harden Hawks	Saturday, 15 June 2:00pm	Boorowa Showground	G. Widdowson
Bungendore Tigers	24 – 20	Binalong Brahmans	Saturday, 15 June 2:00pm	Mick Sherd Oval	J. Tennent
North Canberra Bears	68 – 0	Gunning Roos	Saturday, 15 June 2:45pm	Jamison Oval	G. Taylor
Crookwell Green Devils	14 – 6	UC Grizzlies	Sunday, 16 June 2:45pm	Crookwell Memorial Oval	J. Wharehinga
Boomanulla Raiders		BYE

=== Round 10 ===
Home	Score	Away	Match Information
Home	Score	Away	Date and Time	Venue	Referee
Binalong Brahmans	14 – 26	Harden Hawks	Saturday, 22 June 2:00pm	Binalong Recreation Ground	J. Wharehinga
Gunning Roos	6 – 26	Boorowa Rovers	Saturday, 22 June 2:00pm	Gunning Showground	G. Taylor
UC Grizzlies	18 – 22	Boomanulla Raiders	Saturday, 22 June 2:00pm	Raiders Belconnen	J. Severs
Crookwell Green Devils	26 – 28	North Canberra Bears	Sunday, 23 June 2:30pm	Crookwell Memorial Oval	G. Widdowson
Bungendore Tigers		BYE

=== Round 11 ===
Home	Score	Away	Match Information
Home	Score	Away	Date and Time	Venue	Referee
Binalong Brahmans	14 – 26	North Canberra Bears	Saturday, 29 June 2:00pm	Binalong Recreation Ground	G. Widdowson
Boomanulla Raiders	10 – 64	Harden Hawks	Saturday, 29 June 2:00pm	Boomanulla Oval	M. Hall
Bungendore Tigers	32 – 24	UC Grizzlies	Saturday, 29 June 2:00pm	Mick Sherd Oval	A. McEnaney
Crookwell Green Devils	24* – 0	Gunning Roos	Sunday, 30 June 2:30pm	Crookwell Memorial Oval	N/A
Boorowa Rovers		BYE

=== Round 12 ===
Home	Score	Away	Match Information
Home	Score	Away	Date and Time	Venue	Referee
Gunning Roos	0 – 46	Bungendore Tigers	Saturday, 6 July 2:00pm	Gunning Showground	J. Wharehinga
Boomanulla Raiders	12 – 46	Boorowa Rovers	Saturday, 6 July 2:00pm	Boomanulla Oval	S. Brain
Crookwell Green Devils	14 – 26	Binalong Brahmans	Sunday, 7 July 2:30pm	Crookwell Memorial Oval	G. Widdowson
North Canberra Bears	30* – 0	UC Grizzlies	Sunday, 7 July 2:45pm	Jamison Oval	N/A
Harden Hawks		BYE

=== Round 13 ===
Home	Score	Away	Match Information
Home	Score	Away	Date and Time	Venue	Referee
Binalong Brahmans	22 – 4	Boomanulla Raiders	Saturday, 13 July 2:00pm	Binalong Recreation Ground	S. Brain
UC Grizzlies	12 – 24	Boorowa Rovers	Saturday, 13 July 2:00pm	University of Canberra	J. McManus
Crookwell Green Devils	24 – 28	Bungendore Tigers	Saturday, 13 July 2:30pm	Crookwell Memorial Oval	G. Taylor
Harden Hawks	50 – 0	Gunning Roos	Saturday, 13 July 3:30pm	McLean Oval	G. Widdowson
North Canberra Bears		BYE

=== Round 14 ===
Home	Score	Away	Match Information
Home	Score	Away	Date and Time	Venue	Referee
Boorowa Rovers	26 – 22	Bungendore Tigers	Saturday, 20 July 2:00pm	Boorowa Showground	G. Taylor
Gunning Roos	19* – 0	UC Grizzlies	Saturday, 20 July 2:00pm	Gunning Showground	N/A
North Canberra Bears	14 – 10	Harden Hawks	Saturday, 20 July 2:45pm	Jamison Oval	G. Widdowson
Crookwell Green Devils	54 – 4	Boomanulla Raiders	Sunday, 21 June 2:30pm	Crookwell Memorial Oval	G. Widdowson
Binalong Brahmans		BYE

=== Round 15 ===
Home	Score	Away	Match Information
Home	Score	Away	Date and Time	Venue	Referee
Binalong Brahmans	48 – 4	Gunning Roos	Saturday, 27 July 2:00pm	Binalong Recreation Ground	M. Hall
Boomanulla Raiders	14 – 56	North Canberra Bears	Saturday, 27 July 2:00pm	Boomanulla Oval	G. Doherty
Bungendore Tigers	12 – 16	Harden Hawks	Saturday, 27 July 2:00pm	Mick Sherd Oval	G. Taylor
Crookwell Green Devils	36 – 14	Boorowa Rovers	Sunday, 28 July 2:30pm	Crookwell Memorial Oval	G. Widdowson
UC Grizzlies		BYE

=== Round 16 ===
Home	Score	Away	Match Information
Home	Score	Away	Date and Time	Venue	Referee
Boorowa Rovers	10 – 11	Binalong Brahmans	Saturday, 3 August 2:00pm	Boorowa Showground	G. Taylor
Gunning Roos	10 – 26	Boomanulla Raiders	Saturday, 3 August 2:00pm	Gunning Showground	C. Davis
North Canberra Bears	14 – 26	Bungendore Tigers	Saturday, 3 August 2:45pm	Jamison Oval	A. McEnaney
Harden Hawks	22 – 25	UC Grizzlies	Saturday, 3 August 3:30pm	McLean Oval	G. Widdowson
Crookwell Green Devils		BYE

=== Round 17 ===
Home	Score	Away	Match Information
Home	Score	Away	Date and Time	Venue	Referee
Boorowa Rovers	0 – 22	North Canberra Bears	Saturday, 10 August 2:00pm	Boorowa Showground	G. Taylor
Bungendore Tigers	36 – 6	Boomanulla Raiders	Saturday, 10 August 2:00pm	Mick Sherd Oval	J. McManus
Harden Hawks	14 – 28	Crookwell Green Devils	Saturday, 10 August 3:30pm	McLean Oval	G. Widdowson
UC Grizzlies	12 – 40	Binalong Brahmans	Sunday, 11 August 2:00pm	Raiders Belconnen	J. Gould
Gunning Roos		BYE

=== Round 18 ===
Home	Score	Away	Match Information
Home	Score	Away	Date and Time	Venue	Referee
Gunning Roos	0 – 50	North Canberra Bears	Saturday, 17 August 2:00pm	Gunning Showground	C. Davis
Binalong Brahmans	12 – 25	Bungendore Tigers	Saturday, 17 August 2:00pm	Binalong Recreation Ground	J. Charman
Harden Hawks	12 – 28	Boorowa Rovers	Saturday, 17 August 3:30pm	McLean Oval	G. Widdowson
UC Grizzlies	18 – 40	Crookwell Green Devils	Sunday, 18 August 2:00pm	Raiders Belconnen	S. Brain
Boomanulla Raiders		BYE

=== Finals series ===
Qualifying/Elimination finals
2	Bungendore	23
3	Harden	6
4	Boorowa	12
5	Crookwell	48

Minor and major semi-finals
1	North Canberra	22
2	Bungendore	4
3	Harden	12
5	Crookwell	26

Preliminary final
2	Bungendore	10
5	Crookwell	28

Grand final
1	North Canberra	24
5	Crookwell	16

Home	Score	Away	Match Information
Home	Score	Away	Date and Time	Venue	Referee
Qualifying/Elimination finals
Bungendore Tigers	23 – 6	Harden Hawks	Saturday, 24 August 2:45pm	Seiffert Oval	D. Charman
Boorowa Rovers	12 – 48	Crookwell Green Devils	Sunday, 25 August 1:45pm	Boorowa Showground	G. Widdowson
Minor and major semi-finals
North Canberra Bears	22 – 4	Bungendore Tigers	Saturday, 31 August 2:45pm	Jamison Oval	D. Charman
Harden Hawks	12 – 26	Crookwell Green Devils	Sunday, 1 September 2:45pm	McLean Oval	G. Widdowson
Preliminary final
Bungendore Tigers	10 – 28	Crookwell Green Devils	Saturday, 7 September 2:45pm	Seiffert Oval	G. Widdowson
Grand final
North Canberra Bears	24 – 16	Crookwell Green Devils	Saturday, 14 September 2:45pm	Jamison Oval	G. Widdowson

== Senior Competition results ==
=== Reserve Grade ===
==== Standings ====
Pos	Team	Pld	W	D	L	PF	PA	PD	Pts
1	Queanbeyan Kangaroos RG	16	12	0	4	507	214	+293	28
2	Goulburn Workers Bulldogs RG	16	12	0	4	480	270	+210	28
3	Queanbeyan United Blues RG	16	10	2	4	423	251	+172	26
4	West Belconnen Warriors RG	16	11	0	5	426	306	+120	26
5	Woden Valley Rams RG	16	8	1	7	388	326	+62	21
6	Yass Magpies RG	16	8	1	7	352	332	+20	21
7	Gungahlin Bulls RG	16	3	2	11	322	440	−118	11
8	Tuggeranong Bushrangers RG	16	2	2	12	266	471	−205	10
9	Belconnen United Sharks RG	16	2	0	14	158	712	−554	8

Updated to match(es) played on 18 August 2019. Source:
Rules for classification: 1) points; 2) point difference; 3) points scored

==== Finals series ====
Minor and major semi-finals
1	Queanbeyan	28
2	Goulburn Workers	22
3	Queanbeyan United	4
4	West Belconnen	28

Preliminary final
2	Goulburn Workers	16
4	West Belconnen	30

Grand final
1	Queanbeyan	16
4	West Belconnen	20

Home	Score	Away	Match Information
Home	Score	Away	Date and Time	Venue	Referee
Minor and major semi-finals
Queanbeyan United Blues RG	4 – 28	West Belconnen Warriors RG	Saturday, 24 August 1:10pm	Workers Arena	A. Nightingale
Queanbeyan Kangaroos RG	28 – 22	Goulburn Workers Bulldogs RG	Sunday, 25 August 12:10pm	Seiffert Oval	F. Aiono-Fatu
Preliminary final
Goulburn Workers Bulldogs RG	16 – 30	West Belconnen Warriors RG	Sunday, 1 September 1:10pm	Gungahlin Enclosed Oval	A. Nightingale
Grand final
Queanbeyan Kangaroos RG	16 – 20	West Belconnen Warriors RG	Sunday, 8 September 1:10pm	Seiffert Oval	A. Nightingale

=== Under 19's ===
==== Standings ====
Pos	Team	Pld	W	D	L	PF	PA	PD	Pts
1	Queanbeyan United Blues U19s	13	11	1	1	520	118	+402	31
2	Goulburn Workers Bulldogs U19s	13	11	1	1	462	74	+388	31
3	Woden Valley Rams U19s	13	10	0	3	444	132	+312	28
4	Yass Magpies U19s	13	5	1	7	162	304	−142	19
5	Tuggeranong Bushrangers U19s	13	3	1	9	192	366	−174	15
6	North Canberra Bears U19s	13	3	1	9	162	424	−262	15
7	Crookwell Green Devils U19s	13	1	1	11	108	500	−392	11
8	Harden-Boorowa U19s	7	2	0	5	96	228	−132	10

Updated to match(es) played on 17 August 2019. Source:
Rules for classification: 1) points; 2) point difference; 3) points scored

==== Division 1 Finals series ====
Minor and major semi-finals
1	Queanbeyan United	22
2	Goulburn Workers	6
3	Woden Valley	42
4	Yass	8

Preliminary final
2	Goulburn Workers	22
3	Woden Valley	18

Grand final
1	Queanbeyan United	26
2	Goulburn Workers	10

Home	Score	Away	Match Information
Home	Score	Away	Date and Time	Venue	Referee
Minor and major semi-finals
Woden Valley Rams U19s	42 – 8	Yass Magpies U19s	Saturday, 24 August 11:45am	Workers Arena	E. Fernance
Queanbeyan United Blues U19s	22 – 6	Goulburn Workers Bulldogs U19s	Sunday, 25 August 10:45am	Seiffert Oval	C. Davis
Preliminary final
Goulburn Workers Bulldogs U19s	22 – 18	Woden Valley Rams U19s	Sunday, 1 September 11:45am	Gungahlin Enclosed Oval	E. Fernance
Grand final
Queanbeyan United Blues U19s	26 – 10	Goulburn Workers Bulldogs U19s	Sunday, 8 September 11:40am	Seiffert Oval	E. Fernance

==== Division 2 Finals series ====
Minor and major semi-finals
1	Yass	12
2	Tuggeranong	18
3	North Canberra	30
4	Crookwell	14

Preliminary final
1	Yass	18
3	North Canberra	22

Grand final
2	Tuggeranong	15
3	North Canberra	12

Home	Score	Away	Match Information
Home	Score	Away	Date and Time	Venue	Referee
Minor and major semi-finals
North Canberra Bears U19s	30 – 14	Crookwell Green Devils U19s	Sunday, 25 August 10:45am	Boorowa Showground	J. McCook
Yass Magpies U19s	12 – 18	Tuggeranong Bushrangers U19s	Saturday, 31 August 11:45am	Jamison Oval	C. Davis
Preliminary final
Yass Magpies U19s	18 – 22	North Canberra Bears U19s	Saturday, 7 September 11:45am	Seiffert Oval	C. Davis
Grand final
Tuggeranong Bushrangers U19s	15 – 12	North Canberra Bears U19s	Saturday, 14 September 11:45am	Jamison Oval	C. Davis

=== Ladies League Tag ===
==== Standings ====
Pos	Team	Pld	W	D	L	PF	PA	PD	Pts
1	West Belconnen Warriors LLT	14	13	0	1	332	100	+232	34
2	Goulburn Workers Bulldogs LLT	14	12	0	2	266	108	+158	32
3	Yass Magpies LLT	14	9	0	5	266	146	+120	24
4	Gungahlin Bulls LLT	14	7	1	6	220	148	+72	23
5	Queanbeyan United Blues LLT	14	6	1	7	188	186	+2	21
6	Belconnen United Sharks LLT	14	4	1	9	116	264	−148	17
7	Woden Valley Rams LLT	14	3	1	10	112	192	−80	15
8	Tuggeranong Bushrangers LLT	14	0	0	14	44	400	−356	8

Updated to match(es) played on 18 August 2019. Source:
Rules for classification: 1) points; 2) point difference; 3) points scored

==== Finals series ====
Minor and major semi-finals
1	West Belconnen	32
2	Goulburn Workers	0
3	Yass	10
4	Gungahlin	12

Preliminary final
2	Goulburn Workers	12
4	Gungahlin	6

Grand final
1	West Belconnen	8
2	Goulburn Workers	6

Home	Score	Away	Match Information
Home	Score	Away	Date and Time	Venue	Referee
Minor and major semi-finals
Yass Magpies LLT	10 – 12	Gungahlin Bulls LLT	Saturday, 24 August 10:25am	Workers Arena	G. Miles
West Belconnen Warriors LLT	32 – 0	Goulburn Workers Bulldogs LLT	Sunday, 25 August 9:25am	Seiffert Oval	L. Richardson
Preliminary final
Goulburn Workers Bulldogs LLT	12 – 6	Gungahlin Bulls LLT	Sunday, 1 September 10:25am	Gungahlin Enclosed Oval	G. Miles
Grand final
West Belconnen Warriors LLT	8 – 6	Goulburn Workers Bulldogs LLT	Sunday, 8 September 10:20am	Seiffert Oval	G. Miles

=== Ladies League Tag Second Division ===
==== Standings ====
Pos	Team	Pld	W	D	L	PF	PA	PD	Pts
1	Harden Hawkettes	14	14	0	0	632	12	+620	36
2	Crookwell She Devils	14	11	0	3	326	114	+212	30
3	North Canberra Bears LLT	14	9	1	4	188	120	+68	27
4	Bungendore Tigerettes	14	7	0	7	234	222	+12	22
5	UC Grizzlies LLT	14	5	1	8	150	270	−120	19
6	Boorowa Roverettes	14	4	1	9	174	322	−148	17
7	Binalong Jersey Girls	14	2	1	11	82	330	−248	13
8	Gunning Rooettes	14	1	2	11	68	460	−392	12

Updated to match(es) played on 18 August 2019. Source:
Rules for classification: 1) points; 2) point difference; 3) points scored

==== Finals series ====
Minor and major Qualifying finals
2	Crookwell	10
3	North Canberra	6
4	Bungendore	16
5	UC	14

Minor and major semi-finals
1	Harden	26
2	Crookwell	4
3	North Canberra	6
4	Bungendore	14

Preliminary final
2	Crookwell	10
4	Bungendore	2

Grand final
1	Harden	34
2	Crookwell	6

Home	Score	Away	Match Information
Home	Score	Away	Date and Time	Venue	Referee
Minor and major Qualifying finals
Crookwell She Devils	10 – 6	North Canberra Bears LLT	Saturday, 24 August 1:20pm	Seiffert Oval	J. Black
Bungendore Tigerettes	16 – 14	UC Grizzlies LLT	Sunday, 25 August 12:20pm	Boorowa Showground	J. Black
Minor and major semi-finals
Harden Hawkettes	26 – 4	Crookwell She Devils	Saturday, 31 August 1:20pm	Jamison Oval	A. Richardson
North Canberra Bears LLT	6 – 14	Bungendore Tigerettes	Sunday, 1 September 1:20pm	McLean Oval	J. Black
Preliminary final
Crookwell She Devils	10 – 2	Bungendore Tigerettes	Saturday, 7 September 1:20pm	Seiffert Oval	A. Richardson
Grand final
Harden Hawkettes	34 – 6	Crookwell She Devils	Saturday, 14 September 1:20pm	Jamison Oval	A. Richardson

=== Open Women's Tackle ===
==== Standings ====
Pos	Team	Pld	W	D	L	PF	PA	PD	Pts
1	Yass Magpies W	11	11	0	0	396	52	+344	26
2	Valley Dragons	11	8	0	3	232	132	+100	20
3	Queanbeyan United Blues W	11	7	0	4	390	130	+260	18
4	Boomanulla Buffaloes W	11	6	0	5	383	174	+209	16
5	Bidgee Bulls	10	5	0	5	237	258	−21	14
6	Harden Hawks W	12	2	0	10	98	516	−418	6
7	South Tuggeranong Knights	11	0	0	11	10	484	−474	4

Updated to match(es) played on 17 August 2019. Source:
Rules for classification: 1) points; 2) point difference; 3) points scored

==== Finals series ====
Minor and major semi-finals
1	Yass	42
2	Valley	6
3	Queanbeyan United	12
4	Boomanulla	10

Preliminary final
2	Valley	26
3	Queanbeyan United	10

Grand final
1	Yass	18
2	Valley	8

Home	Score	Away	Match Information
Home	Score	Away	Date and Time	Venue	Referee
Minor and major semi-finals
Queanbeyan United Blues W	12 – 10	Boomanulla Buffaloes W	Friday, 23 August 6:30pm	Walker Park	A. Blackman
Yass Magpies W	42 – 6	Valley Dragons	Friday, 23 August 7:45pm	Walker Park	M. Ryan
Preliminary final
Valley Dragons	26 – 10	Queanbeyan United Blues W	Friday, 30 August 8:20pm	Seiffert Oval	A. Blackman
Grand final
Yass Magpies W	18 – 8	Valley Dragons	Saturday, 7 September 12:45pm	GIO Stadium	A. Blackman

== Junior grand finals ==
Competition	Home	Score	Away	Match Information
Competition	Home	Score	Away	Date and Time	Venue	Referee
Grand finals
Under 18's: Girls	Gungahlin Bulls U18Gs	44 – 12	Goulburn Stockmen U18Gs	Sunday, 1 September 5:45pm	Seiffert Oval	J. Severs
Under 16's: Division 1	Valley Dragons U16s	42 – 14	West Belconnen Warriors U16s Gold	Friday, 30 August 6:00pm	Seiffert Oval	C. Davis
Under 16's: Division 2	Harden-Boorowa U16s	26 – 28	Queanbeyan United Blues U16s	Friday, 30 August 7:15pm	Seiffert Oval	J. McCook
Under 15's: Division 1	Gungahlin Bulls U15s Yellow	10 – 22	Goulburn Stockmen U15s	Sunday, 1 September 4:30pm	Seiffert Oval	L. Richardson
Under 15's: Division 2	Woden Weston Rams U15s	30 – 12	West Belconnen Warriors U15s	Sunday, 1 September 3:15pm	Seiffert Oval	L. Snowie
Under 15's: Girls	Woden Weston Rams U15Gs	24 – 0	Cooma Colts U15Gs	Sunday, 1 September 2:00pm	Seiffert Oval	M. Jones
Under 14's: Division 1	Tuggeranong Buffaloes U14s	10 – 16	Woden Weston Rams U14s	Sunday, 1 September 12:45pm	Seiffert Oval	G. Miles
Under 14's: Division 2	Queanbeyan United Blues U14s	22 – 16	Yass Magpies U14s	Sunday, 1 September 11:30am	Seiffert Oval	S. Ehlers
Under 13's: Division 1	Goulburn Stockmen U13s	28 – 6	Valley Dragons U13s	Sunday, 1 September 10:15am	Seiffert Oval	A. Richardson
Under 13's: Division 2	South Tuggeranong Knights U13s Blue	22 – 8	Yass Magpies U13s	Sunday, 1 September 9:00am	Seiffert Oval	D. Wheeler
Under 12's: Division 1	Goulburn Stockmen U12s Blue	22 – 6	Gungahlin Bulls U12s Yellow	Saturday, 31 August 5:00pm	Seiffert Oval	J. Schumacher
Under 12's: Division 2	Queanbeyan United Blues U12s Blue	24 – 22	South Tuggeranong Knights U12s	Saturday, 31 August 4:00pm	Seiffert Oval	C. Scott
Under 12's: Division 3	Bungendore Tigers U12s	24 – 24	Belconnen United Sharks U12s	Saturday, 31 August 3:00pm	Seiffert Oval	I. McCook
Under 11's: Division 1	Tuggeranong Buffaloes U11s	18 – 12	Belconnen United Sharks U11s Black	Saturday, 31 August 2:00pm	Seiffert Oval	J. Charman
Under 11's: Division 2	Yass Magpies U11s Black	18 – 36	West Belconnen Warriors U11s Green	Saturday, 31 August 1:00pm	Seiffert Oval	K. Nightingale
Under 11's: Division 3	Queanbeyan United Blues U11s White	34 – 18	Yass Magpies U11s White	Saturday, 31 August 12:00pm	Seiffert Oval	M. Bayley
Under 10's: Division 1	Queanbeyan United Blues U10s Blue	22 – 24	Woden Weston Rams U11s Blue	Saturday, 31 August 11:00am	Seiffert Oval	M. Lean
Under 10's: Division 2	Tuggeranong Buffaloes U10s	22 – 28	Gungahlin Bulls U10s Black	Saturday, 31 August 10:00am	Seiffert Oval	C. Cahill
Under 10's: Division 3	Valley Dragons U10s White	22 – 40	Queanbeyan Kangaroos U10s White	Saturday, 31 August 9:00am	Seiffert Oval	D. Bernsons
