= 2018 Canberra Rugby League =

The 2018 Canberra Raiders Cup was the 21st season of the cup, the top division Rugby League club competition in Canberra. The 2018 Canberra Raiders Cup consisted of 18 regular season rounds that began on 5 April and ended on 11 August. There were three playoff rounds, beginning on 18 August with the major semi-final, and ending on 2 September with the grand final.

== Teams ==
There was 9 teams playing in 2018. 5 teams from Canberra, 2 from Queanbeyan, 1 from Yass, and 1 from Goulburn.

All 9 clubs fielded a team in the reserve grade competition. And 6 clubs will field a team in the under 18's competition.

Colours	Team	Home Ground	Coach
	Belconnen United Sharks	O'Connor Oval	Scott Logan
	Goulburn Workers Bulldogs	Workers Arena	Adam Kyle
	Gungahlin Bulls	Gungahlin Enclosed Oval	David Howell
	Queanbeyan Blues	Seiffert Oval	Terry Campese
	Queanbeyan Kangaroos	Seears Workwear Oval	Aaron Gorrell
	Tuggeranong Bushrangers	Greenway Oval	Justin Giteau
	West Belconnen Warriors	Raiders Belconnen	Troy Thompson
	Woden Valley Rams	Phillip District Oval	Ash Barnes
	Yass Magpies	Walker Park	Jarrad Teka

== Ladder ==
Pos	Team	Pld	W	D	L	B	PF	PA	PD	Pts
1	Tuggeranong Bushrangers	16	12	0	4	2	485	276	+209	28
2	Woden Valley Rams	16	11	1	4	2	516	281	+235	27
3	Queanbeyan Kangaroos	16	11	1	4	2	532	326	+206	27
4	West Belconnen Warriors	16	11	0	5	2	400	298	+102	26
5	Yass Magpies	16	10	0	6	2	345	339	+6	24
6	Queanbeyan Blues	16	7	2	7	2	396	393	+3	20
7	Goulburn Workers Bulldogs	16	4	0	12	2	292	488	-186	12
8	Gungahlin Bulls	16	3	1	12	2	303	482	-179	11
9	Belconnen United Sharks	16	0	1	15	2	230	616	-382	5

- Teams highlighted in green have qualified for the finals
- The team highlighted in blue have clinched the minor premiership
- The team highlighted in red have clinched the wooden spoon

=== Ladder progression ===
- Numbers highlighted in green indicate that the team finished the round inside the top 4.
- Numbers highlighted in blue indicates the team finished first on the ladder in that round.
- Numbers highlighted in red indicates the team finished last place on the ladder in that round.
- Underlined numbers indicate that the team had a bye during that round.

Pos	Team	1	2	3	4	5	6	7	8	9	10	11	12	13	14	15	16	17	18
1	Tuggeranong Bushrangers	2	4	6	8	8	10	12	14	16	16	18	20	22	24	26	26	26	28
2	Woden Valley Rams	0	2	2	2	2	4	6	8	10	12	13	15	17	19	21	23	25	27
3	Queanbeyan Kangaroos	2	2	4	6	8	8	10	10	12	14	15	17	19	21	23	25	27	27
4	West Belconnen Warriors	2	4	6	8	10	12	12	14	14	16	18	20	20	20	22	22	24	26
5	Yass Magpies	0	2	4	4	4	6	8	10	12	14	16	16	16	16	18	20	22	24
6	Queanbeyan Blues	2	2	4	6	8	10	12	14	14	14	14	15	16	16	16	18	20	20
7	Goulburn Workers Bulldogs	2	4	4	4	6	6	6	6	6	8	10	10	10	12	12	12	12	12
8	Gungahlin Bulls	0	0	0	0	2	2	2	2	4	4	4	4	5	7	7	9	9	11
9	Belconnen United Sharks	0	0	0	2	2	2	2	2	2	2	2	3	5	5	5	5	5	5

== Canberra Raiders Cup Results (First Grade) ==
=== Round 1 ===
Home	Score	Away	Match Information
Home	Score	Away	Date and Time	Venue	Referee
Queanbeyan Blues	23 – 18	Yass Magpies	Thursday, 5 April 5:35pm	GIO Stadium	Oliver Levido
Tuggeranong Bushrangers	34 – 16	Woden Valley Rams	Saturday, 7 April 3:00pm	Greenway Oval	Andrew Nightingale
Gungahlin Bulls	30 – 34	Queanbeyan Kangaroos	Saturday, 7 April 3:00pm	Gungahlin Enclosed Oval	Oliver Levido
Belconnen United Sharks	24 – 30	Goulburn Workers Bulldogs	Saturday, 7 April 3:00pm	O'Connor Oval	Luke Barrow
West Belconnen Warriors		BYE

=== Round 2 ===
Home	Score	Away	Match Information
Home	Score	Away	Date and Time	Venue	Referee
Woden Valley Rams	38 – 16	Queanbeyan Kangaroos	Saturday, 14 April 3:00pm	Phillip District Oval	Fatu Aiono-Fatu
Queanbeyan Blues	0 – 40	West Belconnen Warriors	Saturday, 14 April 3:00pm	Seiffert Oval	Oliver Levido
Yass Magpies	22 – 18	Belconnen United Sharks	Saturday, 14 April 3:00pm	Walker Park	John Wharehinga
Goulburn Workers Bulldogs	26 – 8	Gungahlin Bulls	Saturday, 14 April 5:15pm	GIO Stadium	Andrew Nightingale
Tuggeranong Bushrangers		BYE

=== Round 3 ===
Home	Score	Away	Match Information
Home	Score	Away	Date and Time	Venue	Referee
Belconnen United Sharks	6 – 56	Queanbeyan Blues	Saturday, 21 April 3:00pm	O'Connor Oval	Luke Barrow
Goulburn Workers Bulldogs	16 – 26	Tuggeranong Bushrangers	Saturday, 21 April 3:00pm	Workers Arena	Oliver Levido
Woden Valley Rams	18 – 19	Yass Magpies	Sunday, 22 April 3:00pm	Phillip District Oval	Andrew Nightingale
West Belconnen Warriors	36 – 26	Gungahlin Bulls	Sunday, 22 April 3:00pm	Raiders Belconnen	Fatu Aiono-Fatu
Queanbeyan Kangaroos		BYE

=== Round 4 ===
Home	Score	Away	Match Information
Home	Score	Away	Date and Time	Venue	Referee
West Belconnen Warriors	32 – 22	Woden Valley Rams	Saturday, 28 April 3:00pm	Raiders Belconnen	Andrew Nightingale
Queanbeyan Kangaroos	44 – 12	Goulburn Workers Bulldogs	Saturday, 28 April 3:00pm	Seears Workwear Oval	Oliver Levido
Yass Magpies	14 – 20	Tuggeranong Bushrangers	Saturday, 28 April 3:00pm	Walker Park	Luke Barrow
Gungahlin Bulls	16 – 36	Queanbeyan Blues	Sunday, 29 April 3:00pm	Gungahlin Enclosed Oval	Adam Williams
Belconnen United Sharks		BYE

=== Round 5 ===
Home	Score	Away	Match Information
Home	Score	Away	Date and Time	Venue	Referee
Tuggeranong Bushrangers	18 – 26	West Belconnen Warriors	Sunday, 6 May 3:00pm	Greenway Oval	Oliver Levido
Gungahlin Bulls	26 – 16	Belconnen United Sharks	Sunday, 6 May 3:00pm	Gungahlin Enclosed Oval	Tyson Flynn
Queanbeyan Blues	22 – 18	Woden Valley Rams	Sunday, 6 May 3:00pm	Seiffert Oval	Andrew Nightingale
Yass Magpies	18 – 28	Queanbeyan Kangaroos	Sunday, 6 May 3:00pm	Walker Park	Fatu Aiono-Fatu
Goulburn Workers Bulldogs		BYE

=== Round 6 ===
Home	Score	Away	Match Information
Home	Score	Away	Date and Time	Venue	Referee
Belconnen United Sharks	10 – 40	Tuggeranong Bushrangers	Saturday, 12 May 3:00pm	O'Connor Oval	Andrew Nightingale
Queanbeyan Blues	38 – 22	Queanbeyan Kangaroos	Saturday, 12 May 3:00pm	Seiffert Oval	Tyson Flynn
Woden Valley Rams	34 – 20	Gungahlin Bulls	Sunday, 13 May 2:00pm	Phillip District Oval	Oliver Levido
Goulburn Workers Bulldogs	12 – 26	West Belconnen Warriors	Sunday, 13 May 2:00pm	Workers Arena	Adam Williams
Yass Magpies		BYE

=== Round 7 ===
Home	Score	Away	Match Information
Home	Score	Away	Date and Time	Venue	Referee
Tuggeranong Bushrangers	51 – 10	Gungahlin Bulls	Sunday, 20 May 3:00pm	Greenway Oval	Adam Williams
West Belconnen Warriors	16 – 18	Yass Magpies	Sunday, 20 May 3:00pm	Raiders Belconnen	Tyson Flynn
Queanbeyan Kangaroos	50 – 12	Belconnen United Sharks	Sunday, 20 May 3:00pm	Seears Workwear Oval	Oliver Levido
Goulburn Workers Bulldogs	10 – 40	Queanbeyan Blues	Sunday, 20 May 3:00pm	Workers Arena	Fatu Aiono-Fatu
Woden Valley Rams		BYE

=== Round 8 ===
Home	Score	Away	Match Information
Home	Score	Away	Date and Time	Venue	Referee
Belconnen United Sharks	16 – 18	West Belconnen Warriors	Saturday, 2 June 3:00pm	O'Connor Oval	Tyson Flynn
Tuggeranong Bushrangers	46 – 22	Queanbeyan Kangaroos	Sunday, 3 June 3:00pm	Greenway Oval	Oliver Levido
Gungahlin Bulls	16 – 30	Yass Magpies	Sunday, 3 June 3:00pm	Gungahlin Enclosed Oval	Adam Williams
Woden Valley Rams	48 – 22	Goulburn Workers Bulldogs	Sunday, 3 June 3:00pm	Phillip District Oval	Andrew Nightingale
Queanbeyan Blues		BYE

=== Round 9 ===
Home	Score	Away	Match Information
Home	Score	Away	Date and Time	Venue	Referee
Belconnen United Sharks	6 – 68	Woden Valley Rams	Saturday, 9 June 3:00pm	O'Connor Oval	Adam Williams
Queanbeyan Kangaroos	52 – 22	West Belconnen Warriors	Saturday, 9 June 3:00pm	Seears Workwear Oval	Oliver Levido
Queanbeyan Blues	8 – 42	Tuggeranong Bushrangers	Saturday, 9 June 3:00pm	Seiffert Oval	Tyson Flynn
Yass Magpies	50 – 24	Goulburn Workers Bulldogs	Saturday, 9 June 3:00pm	Walker Park	Andrew Nightingale
Gungahlin Bulls		BYE

=== Round 10 ===
Home	Score	Away	Match Information
Home	Score	Away	Date and Time	Venue	Referee
Woden Valley Rams	20 – 18	Tuggeranong Bushrangers	Saturday, 16 June 3:00pm	Phillip District Oval	Tyson Flynn
Queanbeyan Kangaroos	42 – 6	Gungahlin Bulls	Saturday, 16 June 3:00pm	Seears Workwear Oval	James Gould
Yass Magpies	14 – 10	Queanbeyan Blues	Saturday, 16 June 3:00pm	Walker Park	Oliver Levido
Goulburn Workers Bulldogs	20 – 12	Belconnen United Sharks	Saturday, 16 June 3:00pm	Workers Arena	Andrew Nightingale
West Belconnen Warriors		BYE

=== Round 11 ===
Home	Score	Away	Match Information
Home	Score	Away	Date and Time	Venue	Referee
Gungahlin Bulls	18 – 32	Goulburn Workers Bulldogs	Saturday, 23 June 3:00pm	Gungahlin Enclosed Oval	Andrew Nightingale
Belconnen United Sharks	18 – 38	Yass Magpies	Saturday, 23 June 3:00pm	O'Connor Oval	Adam Williams
West Belconnen Warriors	14 – 4	Queanbeyan Blues	Saturday, 23 June 3:00pm	Raiders Belconnen	Tyson Flynn
Queanbeyan Kangaroos	22 – 22	Woden Valley Rams	Saturday, 23 June 3:00pm	Seears Workwear Oval	Oliver Levido
Tuggeranong Bushrangers		BYE

=== Round 12 ===
Home	Score	Away	Match Information
Home	Score	Away	Date and Time	Venue	Referee
Tuggeranong Bushrangers	26 – 12	Goulburn Workers Bulldogs	Saturday, 30 June 2:15pm	Greenway Oval	Tyson Flynn
Gungahlin Bulls	8 – 38	West Belconnen Warriors	Saturday, 30 June 3:00pm	Gungahlin Enclosed Oval	Andrew Nightingale
Queanbeyan Blues	22 – 22	Belconnen United Sharks	Saturday, 30 June 3:00pm	Seiffert Oval	James Gould
Yass Magpies	12 – 14	Woden Valley Rams	Saturday, 30 June 3:15pm	Walker Park	Oliver Levido
Queanbeyan Kangaroos		BYE

=== Round 13 ===
Home	Score	Away	Match Information
Home	Score	Away	Date and Time	Venue	Referee
Tuggeranong Bushrangers	42 – 4	Yass Magpies	Saturday, 7 July 3:00pm	Greenway Oval	Oliver Levido
Queanbeyan Blues	25 – 25	Gungahlin Bulls	Saturday, 7 July 3:00pm	Seiffert Oval	Luke Barrow
Goulburn Workers Bulldogs	16 – 18	Queanbeyan Kangaroos	Saturday, 7 July 3:00pm	Workers Arena	John Wharehinga
Woden Valley Rams	30 – 4	West Belconnen Warriors	Sunday, 8 July 3:00pm	Phillip District Oval	Tyson Flynn
Belconnen United Sharks		BYE

=== Round 14 ===
Home	Score	Away	Match Information
Home	Score	Away	Date and Time	Venue	Referee
Belconnen United Sharks	18 – 54	Gungahlin Bulls	Saturday, 14 July 3:00pm	O'Connor Oval	Luke Barrow
Woden Valley Rams	46 – 16	Queanbeyan Blues	Saturday, 14 July 3:00pm	Phillip District Oval	Adam Williams
West Belconnen Warriors	16 – 36	Tuggeranong Bushrangers	Saturday, 14 July 3:00pm	Raiders Belconnen	Oliver Levido
Queanbeyan Kangaroos	46 – 12	Yass Magpies	Saturday, 14 July 3:00pm	Seears Workwear Oval	Tyson Flynn
Goulburn Workers Bulldogs		BYE

=== Round 15 ===
Home	Score	Away	Match Information
Home	Score	Away	Date and Time	Venue	Referee
Tuggeranong Bushrangers	22 – 16	Belconnen United Sharks	Saturday, 21 July 2:15pm	Greenway Oval	Fatu Aiono-Fatu
Gungahlin Bulls	6 – 22	Woden Valley Rams	Saturday, 21 July 3:00pm	Gungahlin Enclosed Oval	Luke Barrow
Queanbeyan Kangaroos	42 – 34	Queanbeyan Blues	Saturday, 21 July 3:00pm	Seears Workwear Oval	Adam Williams
West Belconnen Warriors	28 – 12	Goulburn Workers Bulldogs	Sunday, 22 July 3:00pm	Raiders Belconnen	Oliver Levido
Yass Magpies		BYE

=== Round 16 ===
Home	Score	Away	Match Information
Home	Score	Away	Date and Time	Venue	Referee
Gungahlin Bulls	22 – 12	Tuggeranong Bushrangers	Saturday, 28 July 3:00pm	Gungahlin Enclosed Oval	Andrew Nightingale
Belconnen United Sharks	6 – 34	Queanbeyan Kangaroos	Saturday, 28 July 3:00pm	O'Connor Oval	Fatu Aiono-Fatu
Queanbeyan Blues	44 – 12	Goulburn Workers Bulldogs	Saturday, 28 July 3:00pm	Seiffert Oval	Tyson Flynn
Yass Magpies	16 – 12	West Belconnen Warriors	Saturday, 28 July 3:00pm	Walker Park	Oliver Levido
Woden Valley Rams		BYE

=== Round 17 ===
Home	Score	Away	Match Information
Home	Score	Away	Date and Time	Venue	Referee
Queanbeyan Kangaroos	44 – 6	Tuggeranong Bushrangers	Saturday, 4 August 3:00pm	Seears Workwear Oval	Oliver Levido
Yass Magpies	32 – 12	Gungahlin Bulls	Saturday, 4 August 3:00pm	Walker Park	Tyson Flynn
Goulburn Workers Bulldogs	14 – 38	Woden Valley Rams	Saturday, 4 August 3:00pm	Workers Arena	Adam Williams
West Belconnen Warriors	54 – 12	Belconnen United Sharks	Sunday, 5 August 3:00pm	Raiders Belconnen	Andrew Nightingale
Queanbeyan Blues		BYE

=== Round 18 ===
Home	Score	Away	Match Information
Home	Score	Away	Date and Time	Venue	Referee
Tuggeranong Bushrangers	46 – 18	Queanbeyan Blues	Saturday, 11 August 2:15pm	Greenway Oval	Adam Williams
Woden Valley Rams	62 – 18	Belconnen United Sharks	Saturday, 11 August 3:00pm	Phillip District Oval	Benjamin Seppala
West Belconnen Warriors	18 – 16	Queanbeyan Kangaroos	Saturday, 11 August 3:00pm	Raiders Belconnen	Oliver Levido
Goulburn Workers Bulldogs	22 – 28	Yass Magpies	Saturday, 11 August 3:00pm	Workers Arena	Tyson Flynn
Gungahlin Bulls		BYE

== Canberra Raiders Cup Finals series ==
Minor and major semi-finals
1	Tuggeranong	16
2	Woden	24
3	Queanbeyan	16
4	West Belconnen	18

Preliminary final
1	Tuggeranong	22
4	West Belconnen	0

Grand final
2	Woden	31
1	Tuggeranong	30

Home	Score	Away	Match Information
Home	Score	Away	Date and Time	Venue	Referee
Minor and major semi-finals
Queanbeyan Kangaroos	16 – 18	West Belconnen Warriors	Saturday, 18 August 3:00pm	Seears Workwear Oval	Oliver Levido
Tuggeranong Bushrangers	16 – 24	Woden Valley Rams	Sunday, 19 August 3:00pm	Greenway Oval	Adam Williams
Preliminary final
Tuggeranong Bushrangers	22 – 0	West Belconnen Warriors	Sunday, 26 August 3:30pm	Seiffert Oval	Oliver Levido
Grand final
Woden Valley Rams	31 – 30	Tuggeranong Bushrangers	Sunday, 2 September 3:30pm	Seiffert Oval	Oliver Levido

== George Tooke Shield Results (Second Division) ==
2018 George Tooke Shield
- Duration: 6 April 2018 – 8 September 2018
- Teams: 9
- Premiers: Crookwell Green Devils (4th title)
- Minor premiers: Crookwell Green Devils
- Wooden spoon: ADFA Knights
- Broadcast partners: Bar TV Sports
- Top points scorer(s): Cameron Picker (218)
- Player of the year: Luke Brown
- Top try-scorer(s): Luke Brown (27)

=== Teams ===
There were 9 teams playing in 2018. 3 teams from Canberra. 6 teams from New South Wales towns surrounding Canberra.

5 clubs fielded a side in the second division under 18's competition.

Colours	Team	Home Ground	Coach
	ADFA Knights	Addison Oval	Matthew Cox
	Binalong Brahmans	Binalong Recreation Ground	Peter Adam
	Boorowa Rovers	Boorowa Showground	Josh Burns
	Bungendore Tigers	Mick Sherd Oval	Cameron Hardy
	Crookwell Green Devils	Crookwell Memorial Oval	Chris Chudleigh
	Gunning Roos	Gunning Showground	Thomas Johnson
	Harden Hawks	McLean Oval	Anthony Giannasca
	North Canberra Bears	Jamison Oval	Richard Thorley
	UC Grizzlies	Raiders Belconnen	Joel Glover

=== Ladder ===
Pos	Team	Pld	W	D	L	B	PF	PA	PD	Pts
1	Crookwell Green Devils	16	15	0	1	2	684	192	+492	34
2	Harden Hawks	16	13	1	2	2	750	174	+576	31
3	North Canberra Bears	16	12	1	3	2	623	177	+446	29
4	Boorowa Rovers	16	9	0	7	2	406	347	+59	22
5	Bungendore Tigers	16	8	0	7	2	331	334	-3	22
6	Binalong Brahmans	16	5	0	11	2	225	381	-156	14
7	UC Grizzlies	16	3	1	12	2	218	610	-392	11
8	Gunning Roos	16	3	1	12	2	155	628	-573	11
9	ADFA Knights	16	1	0	15	2	76	631	-555	6

- Teams highlighted in green have qualified for the finals
- The team highlighted in blue have clinched the minor premiership
- The team highlighted in red have clinched the wooden spoon

==== Ladder progression ====
- Numbers highlighted in green indicate that the team finished the round inside the top 5.
- Numbers highlighted in blue indicates the team finished first on the ladder in that round.
- Numbers highlighted in red indicates the team finished last place on the ladder in that round.
- Underlined numbers indicate that the team had a bye during that round.

Pos	Team	1	2	3	4	5	6	7	8	9	10	11	12	13	14	15	16	17	18
1	Crookwell Green Devils	2	4	6	8	8	10	12	14	16	18	20	22	24	26	28	30	32	34
2	Harden Hawks	2	4	6	6	8	10	12	14	16	18	20	22	23	23	25	27	29	31
3	North Canberra Bears	2	4	6	8	10	12	14	14	16	20	22	24	25	25	27	27	27	29
4	Boorowa Rovers	2	4	6	8	10	10	10	12	12	12	14	16	16	18	18	20	22	22
5	Bungendore Tigers	0	2	2	2	4	4	6	8	10	10	12	12	14	16	16	18	20	22
6	Binalong Brahmans	0	0	2	2	2	4	6	6	6	8	8	10	10	12	12	14	14	14
7	UC Grizzlies	0	0	0	1	3	5	3	3	5	5	5	5	7	7	9	9	9	11
8	Gunning Roos	2	2	2	3	3	3	3	5	5	7	7	7	7	7	9	9	11	11
9	ADFA Knights	0	0	0	2	2	4	2	2	2	4	4	4	6	6	6	6	6	6

=== Results ===
==== Round 1 ====
Home	Score	Away	Match Information
Home	Score	Away	Date and Time	Venue	Referee
Bungendore Tigers	0 – 14	North Canberra Bears	Friday, 6 April 7:30pm	Mick Sherd Oval	Scott Jopling
Binalong Brahmans	20 – 34	Boorowa Rovers	Saturday, 7 April 2:00pm	Binalong Recreation Oval	Luke Brown
Gunning Roos	34 – 8	ADFA Knights	Saturday, 7 April 2:00pm	Gunning Showground	John Wharehinga
Crookwell Green Devils	62 – 12	UC Grizzlies	Sunday, 8 April 2:30pm	Crookwell Memorial Oval	Garth Widdowson
Harden Hawks		BYE

==== Round 2 ====
Home	Score	Away	Match Information
Home	Score	Away	Date and Time	Venue	Referee
Crookwell Green Devils	46 – 6	Gunning Roos	Friday, 13 April 7:30pm	Crookwell Memorial Oval	John Wharehinga
Boorowa Rovers	38 – 12	UC Grizzlies	Saturday, 14 April 1:15pm	Boorowa Showground	David Charman
Binalong Brahmans	6 – 32	North Canberra Bears	Saturday, 14 April 2:00pm	Binalong Recreation Oval	James Gould
Harden Hawks	78 – 0	ADFA Knights	Saturday, 14 April 4:30pm	McLean Oval	Andrew O'Brien
Bungendore Tigers		BYE

==== Round 3 ====
Home	Score	Away	Match Information
Home	Score	Away	Date and Time	Venue	Referee
UC Grizzlies	0 – 72	North Canberra Bears	Friday, 20 April 7:30pm	Raiders Belconnen	Adam Williams
Boorowa Rovers	46 – 6	Gunning Roos	Saturday, 21 April 1:15pm	Boorowa Showground	Andrew O'Brien
ADFA Knights	6 – 42	Crookwell Green Devils	Saturday, 21 April 2:00pm	Addison Oval	Jason Severs
Harden Hawks	42 – 12	Bungendore Tigers	Saturday, 21 April 3:30pm	McLean Oval	Garth Widdowson
Binalong Brahmans		BYE

==== Round 4 ====
Home	Score	Away	Match Information
Home	Score	Away	Date and Time	Venue	Referee
Gunning Roos	20 – 20	UC Grizzlies	Saturday, 28 April 2:00pm	Gunning Showground	John Wharehinga
Bungendore Tigers	10 – 40	Boorowa Rovers	Saturday, 28 April 2:00pm	Mick Sherd Oval	Anthony Mcenaney
North Canberra Bears	22 – 16	Harden Hawks	Saturday, 28 April 2:45pm	Jamison Oval	Benjamin Seppala
Crookwell Green Devils	42 – 4	Binalong Brahmans	Sunday, 29 April 2:30pm	Crookwell Memorial Oval	Garth Widdowson
ADFA Knights		BYE

==== Round 5 ====
Home	Score	Away	Match Information
Home	Score	Away	Date and Time	Venue	Referee
ADFA Knights	4 – 68	North Canberra Bears	Thursday, 3 May 7:40pm	Dowsett Ovall	Garth Widdowson
Bungendore Tigers	22 – 4	Gunning Roos	Saturday, 5 May 2:00pm	Mick Sherd Oval	Anthony Mcenaney
UC Grizzlies	32 – 22	Binalong Brahmans	Saturday, 5 May 2:00pm	Raiders Belconnen	Scott Jopling
Harden Hawks	30 – 18	Crookwell Green Devils	Saturday, 5 May 3:30pm	McLean Oval	Garth Widdowson
Boorowa Rovers		BYE

==== Round 6 ====
Home	Score	Away	Match Information
Home	Score	Away	Date and Time	Venue	Referee
Binalong Brahmans	24 – 10	Gunning Roos	Friday, 11 May 7:40pm	Binalong Recreation Ground	Garth Widdowson
Harden Hawks	24 – 12	Boorowa Rovers	Saturday, 12 May 3:30pm	McLean Oval	Scott Jopling
Crookwell Green Devils	32 – 16	Bungendore Tigers	Sunday, 13 May 2:30pm	Crookwell Memorial Oval	Garth Widdowson
ADFA Knights	12 – 10	UC Grizzlies	Tuesday, 5 June 7:40pm	Addison Oval	Garth Widdowson
North Canberra Bears		BYE

==== Round 7 ====
Home	Score	Away	Match Information
Home	Score	Away	Date and Time	Venue	Referee
ADFA Knights	0 – 47*	Binalong Brahmans	Saturday, 19 May 2:00pm	Addison Oval	Geordie Doherty
Gunning Roos	0 – 84	Harden Hawks	Saturday, 19 May 2:00pm	Gunning Showground	Garth Widdowson
Bungendore Tigers	32 – 30	UC Grizzlies	Saturday, 19 May 2:00pm	Mick Sherd Oval	Luke Barrow
North Canberra Bears	22 – 18	Boorowa Rovers	Saturday, 19 May 2:45pm	Jamison Oval	James Gould
Crookwell Green Devils		BYE

==== Round 8 ====
Home	Score	Away	Match Information
Home	Score	Away	Date and Time	Venue	Referee
Binalong Brahmans	18 – 20	Bungendore Tigers	Saturday, 26 May 2:00pm	Binalong Recreation Ground	Garth Widdowson
UC Grizzlies	12 – 62	Harden Hawks	Saturday, 26 May 2:00pm	Raiders Belconnen	Luke Barrow
Boorowa Rovers	46 – 12	ADFA Knights	Saturday, 26 May 2:30pm	Boorowa Showground	David Charman
North Canberra Bears	18 – 30	Crookwell Green Devils	Saturday, 26 May 2:45pm	Jamison Oval	James Gould
Gunning Roos		BYE

==== Round 9 ====
Home	Score	Away	Match Information
Home	Score	Away	Date and Time	Venue	Referee
Bungendore Tigers	54 – 10	ADFA Knights	Friday, 1 June 7:30pm	Mick Sherd Oval	Anthony Mcenaney
Gunning Roos	0 – 56	North Canberra Bears	Saturday, 2 June 2:00pm	Gunning Showground	Benjamin Seppala
Harden Hawks	50 – 4	Binalong Brahmans	Saturday, 2 June 3:30pm	McLean Oval	Garth Widdowson
Crookwell Green Devils	56 – 6	Boorowa Rovers	Sunday, 3 June 2:30pm	Crookwell Memorial Oval	John Wharehinga
UC Grizzlies		BYE

==== Round 10 ====
Home	Score	Away	Match Information
Home	Score	Away	Date and Time	Venue	Referee
ADFA Knights	12 – 22	Gunning Roos	Saturday, 16 June 2:00pm	Addison Oval	Geordie Doherty
UC Grizzlies	16 – 44	Crookwell Green Devils	Saturday, 16 June 2:00pm	Raiders Belconnen	Anthony Mcenaney
Boorowa Rovers	16 – 18	Binalong Brahmans	Saturday, 16 June 2:30pm	Boorowa Showground	Garth Widdowson
North Canberra Bears	48 – 0	Bungendore Tigers	Saturday, 16 June 2:45pm	Jamison Oval	Matthew Hall
Harden Hawks		BYE

==== Round 11 ====
Home	Score	Away	Match Information
Home	Score	Away	Date and Time	Venue	Referee
UC Grizzlies	10 – 30	Boorowa Rovers	Thursday, 21 June 7:30pm	Raiders Belconnen	Benjamin Seppala
Gunning Roos	0 – 60	Crookwell Green Devils	Saturday, 23 June 2:00pm	Gunning Showground	Matthew Hall
North Canberra Bears	36 – 4	Binalong Brahmans	Saturday, 23 June 2:45pm	Jamison Oval	James Gould
ADFA Knights	0 – 70	Harden Hawks	Saturday, 23 June 3:30pm	McLean Oval	Garth Widdowson
Bungendore Tigers		BYE

==== Round 12 ====
Home	Score	Away	Match Information
Home	Score	Away	Date and Time	Venue	Referee
Gunning Roos	10 – 58	Boorowa Rovers	Saturday, 30 June 2:00pm	Gunning Showground	Garth Widdowson
Bungendore Tigers	20 – 28	Harden Hawks	Saturday, 30 June 2:00pm	Mick Sherd Oval	Anthony Mcenaney
North Canberra Bears	62 – 0	UC Grizzlies	Saturday, 30 June 2:45pm	Northbourne Oval	Matthew Hall
Crookwell Green Devils	74 – 0	ADFA Knights	Sunday, 1 July 2:30pm	Crookwell Memorial Oval	James Gould
Binalong Brahmans		BYE

==== Round 13 ====
Home	Score	Away	Match Information
Home	Score	Away	Date and Time	Venue	Referee
Binalong Brahmans	6 – 8	Crookwell Green Devils	Saturday, 7 July 2:00pm	Binalong Recreation Oval	David Charman
UC Grizzlies	24 – 4	Gunning Roos	Saturday, 7 July 2:00pm	Raiders Belconnen	Andrew O'Brien
Boorowa Rovers	4 – 32	Bungendore Tigers	Saturday, 7 July 2:30pm	Boorowa Showground	Garth Widdowson
Harden Hawks	14 – 14	North Canberra Bears	Saturday, 7 July 3:30pm	McLean Oval	James Gould
ADFA Knights		BYE

==== Round 14 ====
Home	Score	Away	Match Information
Home	Score	Away	Date and Time	Venue	Referee
North Canberra Bears	52 – 0	ADFA Knights	Friday, 8 June 7:30pm	Raiders Belconnen	Jason Severs
Binalong Brahmans	30 – 0	UC Grizzlies	Saturday, 14 July 2:00pm	Binalong Recreation Oval	Garth Widdowson
Gunning Roos	10 – 16	Bungendore Tigers	Saturday, 14 July 2:00pm	Gunning Showground	John Wharehinga
Crookwell Green Devils	34 – 20	Harden Hawks	Sunday, 15 July 2:30pm	Crookwell Memorial Oval	James Gould
Boorowa Rovers		BYE

==== Round 15 ====
Home	Score	Away	Match Information
Home	Score	Away	Date and Time	Venue	Referee
Gunning Roos	14 – 12	Binalong Brahmans	Saturday, 21 July 2:00pm	Gunning Showground	Andrew Nightingale
Bungendore Tigers	20 – 38	Crookwell Green Devils	Saturday, 21 July 2:00pm	Mick Sherd Oval	James Gould
Boorowa Rovers	22 – 52	Harden Hawks	Saturday, 21 July 2:30pm	Boorowa Showground	Garth Widdowson
UC Grizzlies	34 – 12	ADFA Knights	Monday, 23 July 7:30pm	Raiders Belconnen	Garth Widdowson
North Canberra Bears		BYE

==== Round 16 ====
Home	Score	Away	Match Information
Home	Score	Away	Date and Time	Venue	Referee
Binalong Brahmans	0* – 0	ADFA Knights	Saturday, 28 July 2:00pm	Binalong Recreation Ground	David Charman
UC Grizzlies	6 – 40	Bungendore Tigers	Saturday, 28 July 2:00pm	Raiders Belconnen	Anthony Mcenaney
Boorowa Rovers	20 – 19	North Canberra Bears	Saturday, 28 July 2:30pm	Boorowa Showground	John Wharehinga
Harden Hawks	62 – 4	Gunning Roos	Saturday, 28 July 3:30pm	McLean Oval	James Gould
Crookwell Green Devils		BYE

==== Round 17 ====
Home	Score	Away	Match Information
Home	Score	Away	Date and Time	Venue	Referee
ADFA Knights	0 – 0*	Boorowa Rovers	Saturday, 4 August 2:00pm	Addison Oval	James Gould
Bungendore Tigers	37 – 10	Binalong Brahmans	Saturday, 4 August 2:00pm	Mick Sherd Oval	Anthony Mcenaney
Harden Hawks	68 – 0	UC Grizzlies	Saturday, 4 August 3:30pm	McLean Oval	John Wharehinga
Crookwell Green Devils	54 – 16	North Canberra Bears	Sunday, 5 August 2:30pm	Crookwell Memorial Oval	Garth Widdowson
Gunning Roos		BYE

==== Round 18 ====
Home	Score	Away	Match Information
Home	Score	Away	Date and Time	Venue	Referee
ADFA Knights	0 – 0*	Bungendore Tigers	Saturday, 11 August 2:00pm	Addison Oval	David Charman
Binalong Brahmans	0 – 50	Harden Hawks	Saturday, 11 August 2:00pm	Binalong Recreation Ground	Garth Widdowson
Boorowa Rovers	16 – 44	Crookwell Green Devils	Saturday, 11 August 2:30pm	Boorowa Showground	James Gould
North Canberra Bears	72 – 11	Gunning Roos	Saturday, 11 August 2:45pm	Jamison Oval	Geordie Doherty
UC Grizzlies		BYE

== George Tooke Shield Finals series ==
Minor and major Qualifying finals
2	Harden	15
3	North Canberra	14
4	Boorowa	28
5	Bungendore	20

Minor and major semi-finals
1	Crookwell	36
2	Harden	14
3	North Canberra	30
4	Boorowa	14

Preliminary final
2	Harden	12
3	North Canberra	15

Grand final
1	Crookwell	22
3	North Canberra	16

Home	Score	Away	Match Information
Home	Score	Away	Date and Time	Venue	Referee
Minor and major Qualifying finals
Boorowa Rovers	28 – 20	Bungendore Tigers	Saturday, 18 August 2:45pm	Boorowa Showground	Garth Widdowson
Harden Hawks	15 – 14	North Canberra Bears	Sunday, 19 August 2:45pm	McLean Oval	James Gould
Minor and major semi-finals
North Canberra Bears	30 – 14	Boorowa Rovers	Saturday, 25 August 2:45pm	Jamison Oval	Garth Widdowson
Crookwell Green Devils	36 – 14	Harden Hawks	Sunday, 26 August 2:45pm	Crookwell Memorial Oval	James Gould
Preliminary final
Harden Hawks	12 – 15	North Canberra Bears	Saturday, 1 September 2:45pm	McLean Oval	Garth Widdowson
Grand final
Crookwell Green Devils	22 – 16	North Canberra Bears	Saturday, 8 September 2:45pm	Crookwell Memorial Oval	Garth Widdowson

=== Notes ===
* - Won by forfeit

== Reserve Grade Finals series ==
=== Canberra Raiders Cup Reserve Grade ===
==== Finals series ====
Minor and major semi-finals
1	Queanbeyan	26
2	West Belconnen	16
3	Woden	18
4	Queanbeyan	10

Preliminary final
2	West Belconnen	22
3	Woden	14

Grand final
1	Queanbeyan	16
2	West Belconnen	24

Home	Score	Away	Match Information
Home	Score	Away	Date and Time	Venue	Referee
Minor and major semi-finals
Woden Valley Rams RG	18 – 10	Queanbeyan Kangaroos RG	Saturday, 18 August 1:10pm	Seears Workwear Oval	Tyson Flynn
Queanbeyan Blues RG	26 – 16	West Belconnen Warriors RG	Sunday, 19 August 1:10pm	Greenway Oval	Luke Barrow
Preliminary final
West Belconnen Warriors RG	22 – 14	Woden Valley Rams RG	Sunday, 26 August 1:40pm	Seiffert Oval	Adam Williams
Grand final
Queanbeyan Blues RG	16 – 24	West Belconnen Warriors RG	Sunday, 2 September 1:40pm	Seiffert Oval	Adam Williams

== Under 18's Finals series' ==
=== Canberra Raiders Cup Under 18's ===
==== Finals series ====
Minor and major semi-finals
1	Queanbeyan	26
2	Woden	18
3	Goulburn	38
4	Tuggeranong	16

Preliminary final
2	Woden	16
3	Goulburn	28

Grand final
1	Queanbeyan	28
3	Goulburn	18

Home	Score	Away	Match Information
Home	Score	Away	Date and Time	Venue	Referee
Minor and major semi-finals
Goulburn Workers Bulldogs U18s	38 – 16	Tuggeranong Bushrangers U18s	Saturday, 18 August 11:45am	Seears Workwear Oval	Andrew Nightingale
Queanbeyan Blues U18s	26 – 18	Woden Valley Rams U18s	Sunday, 19 August 11:45am	Greenway Oval	Benjamin Seppala
Preliminary final
Woden Valley Rams U18s	16 – 28	Goulburn Workers Bulldogs U18s	Sunday, 26 August 10:40am	Seiffert Oval	Benjamin Seppala
Grand final
Queanbeyan Blues U18s	28 – 18	Goulburn Workers Bulldogs U18s	Sunday, 2 September 10:40am	Seiffert Oval	Benjamin Seppala

=== George Tooke Shield Youth League ===
==== Finals series ====
Minor and major Qualifying finals
2	Harden Boorowa	18
3	Crookwell	6
4	North Canberra	36
5	Tuggeranong	16

Minor and major semi-finals
1	Yass	20
2	Harden Boorowa	10
3	Crookwell	12
4	North Canberra	38

Preliminary final
2	Harden Boorowa	24
4	North Canberra	12

Grand final
1	Yass	10
2	Harden Boorowa	2

Home	Score	Away	Match Information
Home	Score	Away	Date and Time	Venue	Referee
Minor and major Qualifying finals
North Canberra Bears YL	36 – 16	Tuggeranong Bushrangers YL	Saturday, 18 August 11:45am	Boorowa Showground	Jake McCook
Harden Boorowa	18 – 6	Crookwell Green Devils YL	Sunday, 19 August 11:45am	McLean Oval	John Wharehinga
Minor and major semi-finals
Crookwell Green Devils YL	12 – 38	North Canberra Bears YL	Saturday, 25 August 11:45am	Jamison Oval	John Wharehinga
Yass Magpies YL	20 – 10	Harden Boorowa	Sunday, 26 August 11:45am	Crookwell Memorial Oval	Jake McCook
Preliminary final
Harden Boorowa	24 – 12	North Canberra Bears YL	Saturday, 1 September 11:45am	McLean Oval	John Wharehinga
Grand final
Yass Magpies YL	10 – 2	Harden Boorowa	Saturday, 8 September 11:45am	Crookwell Memorial Oval	John Wharehinga

== Ladies League Tag Finals series' ==
=== Canberra Raiders Cup Ladies League Tag ===
==== Finals series ====
Minor and major semi-finals
1	West Belconnen	22
2	Goulburn	6
3	Yass	8
4	Gungahlin	0

Preliminary final
2	Goulburn	18
3	Yass	0

Grand final
1	West Belconnen	10
2	Goulburn	4

Home	Score	Away	Match Information
Home	Score	Away	Date and Time	Venue	Referee
Minor and major semi-finals
Yass Magpies LLT	8 – 0	Gungahlin Bulls LLT	Saturday, 18 August 10:25am	Seears Workwear Oval	Lachlan Heisner
West Belconnen Warriors LLT	22 – 6	Goulburn Workers Bulldogs LLT	Sunday, 19 August 10:25am	Greenway Oval	Aidan Richardson
Preliminary final
Goulburn Workers Bulldogs LLT	18 – 0	Yass Magpies LLT	Sunday, 26 August 9:20am	Seiffert Oval	Aidan Richardson
Grand final
West Belconnen Warriors LLT	10 – 4	Goulburn Workers Bulldogs LLT	Sunday, 2 September 9:20am	Seiffert Oval	Aidan Richardson

=== George Tooke Shield Ladies League Tag ===
==== Finals series ====
Minor and major Qualifying finals
2	Bungendore	16
3	Crookwell	18
4	Boorowa	0
5	North Canberra	14

Minor and major semi-finals
1	Harden	16
3	Crookwell	12
2	Bungendore	28
5	North Canberra	4

Preliminary final
3	Crookwell	8
2	Bungendore	32

Grand final
1	Harden	14
2	Bungendore	10

Home	Score	Away	Match Information
Home	Score	Away	Date and Time	Venue	Referee
Minor and major Qualifying finals
Boorowa Roverettes	0 – 14	North Canberra Bears LLT	Saturday, 18 August 1:20pm	Boorowa Showground	Liam Richardson
Bungendore Tigerettes	16 – 18	Crookwell She Devils	Sunday, 19 August 1:20pm	McLean Oval	Jack Black
Minor and major semi-finals
Bungendore Tigerettes	28 – 4	North Canberra Bears LLT	Saturday, 25 August 1:20pm	Jamison Oval	Jack Black
Harden Hawkettes	16 – 12	Crookwell She Devils	Sunday, 26 August 1:20pm	Crookwell Memorial Oval	Liam Richardson
Preliminary final
Crookwell She Devils	8 – 32	Bungendore Tigerettes	Saturday, 1 September 1:20pm	McLean Oval	Jack Black
Grand final
Harden Hawkettes	14 – 10	Bungendore Tigerettes	Saturday, 8 September 1:20pm	Crookwell Memorial Oval	Jack Black

== Open Women's Tackle Finals series ==
=== Katrina Fanning Shield ===
==== Finals series ====
Minor and major semi-finals
1	Yass	42
2	Queanbeyan	4
3	Goulburn	62
4	Tuggeranong	0

Preliminary final
2	Queanbeyan	22
3	Goulburn	32

Grand final
1	Yass	8
3	Goulburn	20

Home	Score	Away	Match Information
Home	Score	Away	Date and Time	Venue	Referee
Minor and major semi-finals
Yass Magpies	42 – 4	Queanbeyan Blues	Friday, 17 August 7:00pm	Walker Park	Elijah Fernance
Goulburn Stockmen	62 – 0	Tuggeranong Buffaloes	Friday, 17 August 7:00pm	Workers Arena	Andrew O'Brien
Preliminary final
Queanbeyan Blues	22 – 32	Goulburn Stockmen	Sunday, 26 August 12:10pm	Seiffert Oval	Elijah Fernance
Grand final
Yass Magpies	8 – 20	Goulburn Stockmen	Sunday, 2 September 12:10pm	Seiffert Oval	Elijah Fernance

== See also ==
- Canberra Rugby League
