= Woden Valley Rams =

Australian rugby league football club based in Woden, Australian Capital Territory

Club information
- Full name: Woden Valley Rams Rugby League Football Club
- Short name: Rams
- Colours: Blue; Gold
- Founded: 1967
- Website: Official website

Current details
- Ground: Phillip District Ovals
- Coach: Lincoln Withers
- Captain: Lauren Scrivner
- Competition: Canberra Raiders Cup
- 2018 Season: 2nd (Premiers)
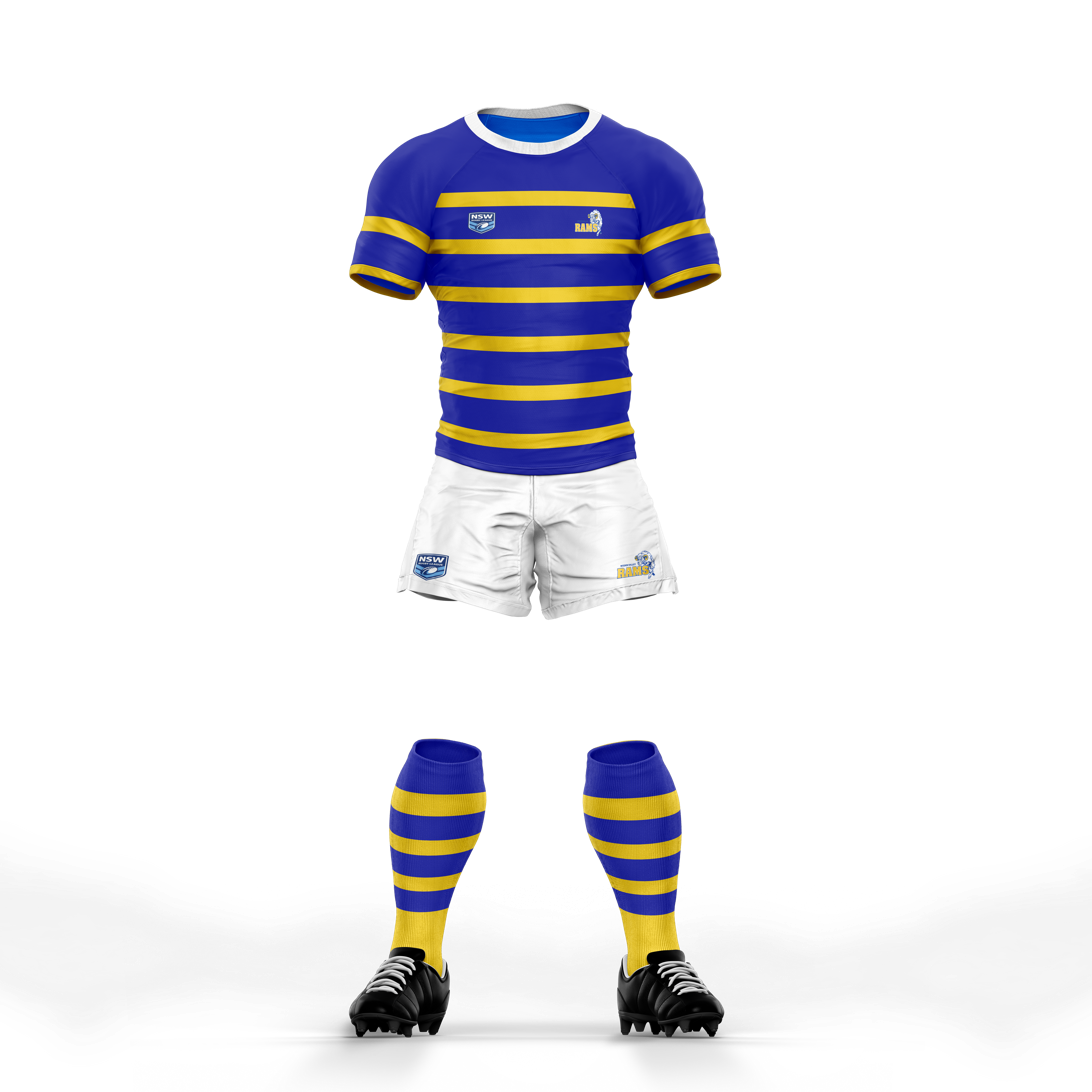
- Home colours

Records
- Premierships: 3 (1988, 1996, 2018)
- Runners-up: 4 (1986, 1989, 1990, 1991)
- Reserve Grade Premierships: 1 (2011)
- Under 18/19s Premierships: 2 (2015, 2017)
- Second Division Premierships: 1 (1969)
- Women's Premierships: 1 (1998)

Woden Valley Rams Rugby League Club is an Australian rugby league football club based in Woden, Australian Capital Territory formed in 1967. In 2018, the Rams won their first premiership since 1996 beating the Tuggeranong Bushrangers 31–30.

== Notable juniors ==
- Nigel Gaffey (1989–2000 Canberra Raiders, Sydney Roosters & Penrith Panthers)
- David Cox (1995–99 Canberra Raiders & Illawarra Steelers)
- Luke Priddis (1997–2010 Canberra Raiders, Brisbane Broncos, Penrith Panthers & St George Illawarra Dragons)
- Lincoln Withers (2000–13 Canberra Raiders, Wests Tigers, St George Illawarra Dragons & Hull F.C.)
- Brenton Lawrence (2011–present Gold Coast Titans & Manly Sea Eagles)
- Sami Sauiluma (2013–present Canberra Raiders, Cronulla Sharks & Gold Coast Titans)
- Bailey Simonsson (2018–present Canberra Raiders and Parramatta Eels)
- Junior Tupou (2022–present Sydney Roosters,Dolphins and Wests Tigers)
- John Jarvie (1980–1984 Cronulla Sharks and South Sydney Rabbitohs)
- Lazarus Vaalepu (2025-present Melbourne Storm)
- Jed Stuart (2025-present Canberra Raiders)
