= 2025 NSWRL Feeder Competitions =

Rugby competition in New South Wales

The 2025 NSWRL Feeder Competitions are the competitions that feed either directly or indirectly into the teams playing in NSWRL Major Competitions.

== Central Sydney & Macarthur Region ==
=== Northern Gold Competition ===
The Northern Gold Competition is a men's rugby league conference competition based in Sydney comprising the districts of Manly Warringah and North Sydney. This competition effectively acts as a third grade feeding into the Ron Massey Cup.

==== Teams ====
There are multiple changes for the 2025 competition. The competition will mostly feature teams from the Manly Warringah district, with 2 teams from the North Sydney district and 1 team from the Eastern Suburbs district.

| Colours | Club | NSW Cup/RMC Affiliate | Home ground(s) | Head coach |
|---|---|---|---|---|
| | Asquith Magpies | North Sydney Bears | Storey Park | TBA |
| | Avalon Bulldogs | Manly Warringah Sea Eagles | Hitchcock Park | TBA |
| | Belrose Eagles | Manly Warringah Sea Eagles | Lionel Watts Park | TBA |
| | Berowra Wallabies | North Sydney Bears | Warrina Street Oval | TBA |
| | Bondi United | Sydney Roosters | Waverley Oval | TBA |
| | Cromer Kingfishers | Manly Warringah Sea Eagles | St Matthews Farm | TBA |
| | Forestville Ferrets | Manly Warringah Sea Eagles | Forestville Oval | TBA |
| | Mona Vale Raiders | Manly Warringah Sea Eagles | Newport Park | TBA |
| | Narrabeen Sharks | Manly Warringah Sea Eagles | Lake Park | TBA |
| | Narraweena Hawks | Manly Warringah Sea Eagles | Beverley Job Oval | TBA |

==== Ladder ====
| Pos | Team | Pld | W | D | L | B | PF | PA | PD | Pts | Qualification |
|---|---|---|---|---|---|---|---|---|---|---|---|
| 1 | Avalon Bulldogs | 12 | 9 | 2 | 1 | 0 | 327 | 125 | +202 | 32 | Minor Premiers & Semi-Finals |
| 2 | Asquith Magpies | 12 | 9 | 0 | 3 | 0 | 404 | 186 | +218 | 30 | Semi-Finals |
| 3 | Narrabeen Sharks | 12 | 9 | 0 | 3 | 0 | 320 | 142 | +178 | 30 | Elimination Finals |
| 4 | Cromer Kingfishers | 12 | 6 | 3 | 3 | 0 | 251 | 175 | +76 | 27 | Elimination Finals |
| 5 | Forestville Ferrets | 12 | 5 | 0 | 7 | 0 | 183 | 310 | -127 | 22 | Elimination Finals |
| 6 | Mona Vale Raiders | 12 | 3 | 3 | 6 | 0 | 191 | 271 | –80 | 21 | Elimination Finals |
| 7 | Narraweena Hawks | 12 | 3 | 3 | 6 | 0 | 200 | 298 | –98 | 21 | |
| 8 | Belrose Eagles | 12 | 3 | 0 | 9 | 0 | 146 | 288 | -142 | 18 | |

Updated to match(es) played on 1 September. Source:
Rules for classification: 1) points; 2) point difference; 3) points scored

==== Ladder progression ====
- Numbers highlighted in green indicate that the team finished the round inside the top 6.
- Numbers highlighted in blue indicates the team finished first on the ladder in that round.
- Numbers highlighted in red indicates the team finished last place on the ladder in that round.
- Underlined numbers indicate that the team had a bye during that round.

| Pos | Team | 1 | 2 | 3 | 4 | 5 | 6 | 7 | 8 | 9 | 10 | 11 | 12 | 13 | 14 | 15 |
|---|---|---|---|---|---|---|---|---|---|---|---|---|---|---|---|---|
| 1 | Avalon Bulldogs | 3 | 6 | 9 | 12 | 14 | 14 | 17 | 18 | 21 | 24 | 27 | 29 | 32 | 32 | 32 |
| 2 | Narrabeen Sharks | 3 | 4 | 7 | 10 | 11 | 11 | 14 | 17 | 18 | 21 | 24 | 27 | 30 | 30 | 30 |
| 3 | Asquith Magpies | 3 | 6 | 9 | 10 | 13 | 13 | 14 | 17 | 18 | 21 | 24 | 27 | 30 | 30 | 29* |
| 4 | Cromer Kingfishers | 1 | 4 | 5 | 8 | 10 | 10 | 13 | 16 | 19 | 21 | 22 | 24 | 27 | 27 | 27 |
| 5 | Forestville Ferrets | 3 | 6 | 7 | 10 | 13 | 13 | 14 | 15 | 18 | 19 | 20 | 21 | 22 | 22 | 22 |
| 6 | Mona Vale Raiders | 1 | 2 | 5 | 6 | 8 | 8 | 11 | 14 | 16 | 18 | 19 | 20 | 21 | 21 | 21 |
| 7 | Narraweena Hawks | 1 | 2 | 4 | 7 | 9 | 9 | 10 | 11 | 13 | 14 | 17 | 20 | 21 | 21 | 21 |
| 8 | Belrose Eagles | 3 | 6 | 7 | 8 | 11 | 11 | 12 | 13 | 14 | 15 | 16 | 17 | 18 | 18 | 18 |

- Following Round 5, competition re-grading took place. Both Bondi United & Berowra moved to different competitions, with the rest of the teams left unaffected.
- Asquith were stripped 1 point due to unspecified breacher

Season Results:

| Home | Score | Away | Match Information |
| Home | Score | Away | Date and Time | Venue | Referee | Video |
|---|---|---|---|---|---|---|
Round 1
| Avalon Bulldogs | 32 – 4 | Narraweena Hawks | Saturday, 5 April, 7:00pm | Hitchcock Park | TBA |
| Belrose Eagles | 22 – 6 | Bondi United | Sunday, 6 April, 1:30pm | Lionel Watts Park | TBA |
| Forestville Ferrets | 14 – 10 | Cromer Kingfishers | Sunday, 6 April, 3:00pm | Forestville Oval | TBA |
| Narrabeen Sharks | 42 – 10 | Berowra Wallabies | Sunday, 6 April, 3:00pm | Lake Park | TBA |
| Mona Vale Raiders | 16 – 36 | Asquith Magpies | Sunday, 6 April, 3:00pm | Newport Park | TBA |
Round 2
| Asquith Magpies | 20 – 16 | Narrabeen Sharks | Sunday, 13 April, 1:00pm | Industree Group Stadium | TBA |
| Narraweena Hawks | 16 – 22 | Forestville Ferrets | Sunday, 13 April, 3:00pm | Beverley Job Oval | TBA |
| Avalon Bulldogs | 24 – 10 | Bondi United | Sunday, 13 April, 3:00pm | Hitchcock Park | TBA |
| Berowra Wallabies | 4 – 20 | Belrose Eagles | Sunday, 13 April, 3:00pm | Warrina Street Oval | TBA |
| Cromer Kingfishers | 22 – 0 | Mona Vale Raiders | Sunday, 13 April, 3:00pm | St Matthews Farm | TBA |
Round 3
| Forestville Ferrets | 16 – 42 | Avalon Bulldogs | Sunday, 4 May, 3:00pm | Forestville Oval | TBA |
| Belrose Eagles | 8 – 36 | Asquith Magpies | Sunday, 4 May, 3:00pm | Lionel Watts Park | TBA |
| Narrabeen Sharks | 20 – 6 | Cromer Kingfishers | Sunday, 4 May, 3:00pm | Lake Park | TBA |
| Berowra Wallabies | 20 – 30 | Mona Vale Raiders | Sunday, 4 May, 3:00pm | Warrina Street Oval | TBA |
| Bondi United | 17 – 17* | Narraweena Hawks | Washout |
Round 4
| Narraweena Hawks | 24 – 14 | Belrose Eagles | Sunday, 11 May, 3:00pm | Beverley Job Oval | TBA |
| Bondi United | 12 – 50 | Cromer Kingfishers | Sunday, 11 May, 3:00pm | Harbord Park | TBA |
| Mona Vale Raiders | 6 – 26 | Narrabeen Sharks | Sunday, 11 May, 3:00pm | Newport Park | TBA |
| Asquith Magpies | 10 – 14 | Avalon Bulldogs | Sunday, 11 May, 3:00pm | Storey Park | TBA |
| Berowra Wallabies | 12 – 46 | Forestville Ferrets | Sunday, 11 May, 3:00pm | Warrina Street Oval | TBA |
Round 5
| Narrabeen Sharks | 6 – 20 | Belrose Eagles | Sunday, 18 May, 3:00pm | Lake Park | TBA |
| Asquith Magpies | 56 – 18 | Berowra Wallabies | Sunday, 18 May, 3:00pm | Storey Park | TBA |
| Forestville Ferrets | 29* – 0 | Bondi United | N/A |
| Avalon Bulldogs | 17 – 17* | Cromer Kingfishers | Washout |
| Mona Vale Raiders | 17 – 17* | Narraweena Hawks | Washout |
Round 6
| Asquith Magpies | V | Narraweena Hawks | Washout |
| Avalon Bulldogs | V | Mona Vale Raiders | Washout |
| Narrabeen Sharks | V | Forestville Ferrets | Washout |
| Belrose Eagles | V | Cromer Kingfishers | Washout |
Round 7
| Narraweena Hawks | 16 – 32 | Narrabeen Sharks | Sunday, 1 June, 3:00pm | Beverley Job Oval | TBA |
| Forestville Ferrets | 6 – 32 | Mona Vale Raiders | Sunday, 1 June, 3:00pm | Forestville Oval | TBA |
| Belrose Eagles | 0 – 40 | Avalon Bulldogs | Sunday, 1 June, 3:00pm | Lionel Watts Park | TBA |
| Cromer Kingfishers | 18 – 4 | Asquith Magpies | Sunday, 1 June, 3:00pm | St Matthews Farm | TBA |
Round 8
| Narraweena Hawks | 12 – 28 | Cromer Kingfishers | Saturday, 14 June, 7:00pm | Beverley Job Oval | TBA |
| Narrabeen Sharks | 24 – 10 | Avalon Bulldogs | Sunday, 15 June, 3:00pm | Lake Park | TBA |
| Mona Vale Raiders | 18 – 6 | Belrose Eagles | Sunday, 15 June, 3:00pm | Newport Park | TBA |
| Asquith Magpies | 30 – 12 | Forestville Ferrets | Sunday, 15 June, 3:00pm | Storey Park | TBA |
Round 9
| Forestville Ferrets | 8 – 4 | Belrose Eagles | Saturday, 21 June, 4:30pm | Forestville Oval | TBA |
| Avalon Bulldogs | 34 – 14 | Asquith Magpies | Saturday, 21 June, 6:00pm | Hitchcock Park | TBA |
| Narraweena Hawks | 24 – 24 | Mona Vale Raiders | Sunday, 22 June, 3:00pm | Beverley Job Oval | TBA |
| Cromer Kingfishers | 28 – 10 | Narrabeen Sharks | Sunday, 22 June, 3:00pm | St Matthews Farm | TBA |
Round 10
| Asquith Magpies | 54 – 10 | Belrose Eagles | Sunday, 29 June, 3:00pm | Storey Park | TBA |
| Narraweena Hawks | 10 – 32 | Avalon Bulldogs | Sunday, 29 June, 3:00pm | Beverley Job Oval | TBA |
| Forestville Ferrets | 0 – 44 | Narrabeen Sharks | Sunday, 29 June, 3:00pm | Forestville Oval | TBA |
| Mona Vale Raiders | 10 – 10 | Cromer Kingfishers | Sunday, 29 June, 3:00pm | Newport Park | TBA |
Round 11
| Avalon Bulldogs | 42 – 0 | Forestville Ferrets | Sunday, 6 July, 3:00pm | Hitchcock Park | TBA |
| Narrabeen Sharks | 24 – 16 | Mona Vale Raiders | Sunday, 6 July, 3:00pm | Lake Park | TBA |
| Belrose Eagles | 20 – 22 | Narraweena Hawks | Sunday, 6 July, 3:00pm | Lionel Watts Park | TBA |
| Asquith Magpies | 44 – 18 | Cromer Kingfishers | Sunday, 6 July, 3:00pm | Storey Park | TBA |
Round 12
| Asquith Magpies | 56 – 18 | Mona Vale Raiders | Sunday, 20 July, 3:00pm | Storey Park | TBA |
| Forestville Ferrets | 26 – 34 | Narraweena Hawks | Sunday, 20 July, 3:00pm | Forestville Oval | TBA |
| Belrose Eagles | 6 – 42 | Narrabeen Sharks | Sunday, 20 July, 3:00pm | Lionel Watts Park | TBA |
| Cromer Kingfishers | 16 – 16 | Avalon Bulldogs | Sunday, 20 July, 3:00pm | St Matthews Farm | TBA |
Round 13
| Mona Vale Raiders | 4 – 24 | Avalon Bulldogs | Saturday, 26 July, 6:10pm | Newport Park | TBA |
| Forestville Ferrets | 4 – 44 | Asquith Magpies | Sunday, 27 July, 3:00pm | Forestville Oval | TBA |
| Narrabeen Sharks | 34 – 4 | Narraweena Hawks | Sunday, 27 July, 3:00pm | Lake Park | TBA |
| Cromer Kingfishers | 28 – 16 | Belrose Eagles | Sunday, 27 July, 3:00pm | St Matthews Farm | TBA |
Round 14
| Cromer Kingfishers | V | Forestville Ferrets | Washout |
| Narraweena Hawks | V | Asquith Magpies | Washout |
| Avalon Bulldogs | V | Narrabeen Sharks | Washout |
| Belrose Eagles | V | Mona Vale Raiders | Washout |
Round 15
| Cromer Kingfishers | V | Narraweena Hawks | Washout |
| Avalon Bulldogs | V | Belrose Eagles | Washout |
| Narrabeen Sharks | V | Asquith Magpies | Washout |
| Mona Vale Raiders | V | Forestville Ferrets | Washout |
Finals Series
Elimination Finals
| Cromer Kingfishers | 30 – 14 | Forestville Ferrets | Sunday, 17 August, 3:00pm | St Matthews Farm | TBA |
| Asquith Magpies | 34 – 18 | Mona Vale Raiders | Sunday, 17 August, 4:00pm | Storey Park | TBA |
Semi-Finals
| Avalon Bulldogs | 16 – 2 | Cromer Kingfishers | Sunday, 24 August, 3:00pm | Newport Park | TBA |
| Narrabeen Sharks | 10 – 22 | Asquith Magpies | Sunday, 24 August, 3:00pm | Lake Park | TBA |
Grand Final
| Avalon Bulldogs | 28 – 16 | Asquith Magpies | Sunday, 31 August, 3:00pm | Pittwater Rugby Park | Jake Walsh |

==== Grand Final ====
Elimination Finals
4 | Cromer | 30
5 | Forestville | 14
3 | Asquith | 34
6 | Mona Vale | 18

Semi-Finals
1 | Avalon | 16
4 | Cromer | 2
2 | Narrabeen | 10
3 | Asquith | 22

Grand Final
1 | Avalon | 28
3 | Asquith | 16

2025 Combined Northern Gold Grand Final

Sunday, 31 August 2025
3:00pm

| Avalon Bulldogs | 28 – 16 | Asquith Magpies |
|---|---|---|
| Tries: Taine Allen 2 Corey Kirkham 1 Maxwell Barry 1 Goals: William Kelly 4 Chandler Walton 1 Maxwell Barry 1 | | Tries: 2 Nathan Stewart; 1 Kyal Cruickshank; Goals: 2 Jimmy Hawkins |

Pittwater Rugby Park, Sydney
Referee: Jake Walsh
Touch judges: Keith Povard & Josh Leigh
In Goal judges: Zac McDonald & Alex Le Geyt

Team details
| Avalon | | Position | Asquith |
| Name | Number | Position | Number | Name |
|---|---|---|---|---|
| Michael Bowden | 1 | Fullback | 1 | Mitchell MacDonald |
| Ryan Clissold | 2 | Wing | 2 | Bernard Wilson |
| Taine Allen | 3 | Centre | 3 | Nicholas Andersen |
| Jack Schofield | 4 | Centre | 24 | Kane Mirabile-Kumar |
| Chad Walton | 5 | Wing | 5 | Nathan Stewart |
| Jedd Wheeler | 6 | Five eighth | 6 | Jimmy Hawkins |
| Will Kelly (c) | 7 | Half back | 7 | Aden Clarke |
| Jake Lloyd | 8 | Prop forward | 8 | Marcus Shepherd |
| Jack Crutch | 9 | Hooker | 9 | Kyal Cruickshank |
| Max Girdler | 10 | Prop forward | 11 | Luke Pollard |
| Max Barry | 11 | Second row | 25 | Mitch Cox |
| Oscar Barry | 12 | Second row | 12 | Tanson Lavapesi-Simi |
| Corey Kirkham | 13 | Lock forward | 13 | Andrew Taylor |
| Bailey Graham | 14 | Interchange | 4 | Hamish McFadyen |
| Matt Andrews | 15 | Interchange | 10 | Adrian Altea |
| Tom Walsh | 16 | Interchange | 14 | Jarrod Shoenmaker |
| Cody Davis | 17 | Interchange | 15 | Ryan Salt |
| Kurt Stevenson | 18 | Concussion substitute | 18 | Nathan Hassan |
| Josh Kamara | 19 | Interchange | 20 | Pat Nowland |
| Liam Thompson | 20 | Interchange |
| Haig Sare | | Coach | | Jack Hawkins |

=== Parramatta Gold Competition ===
The Parramatta Gold Competition is a men's rugby league competition based in Sydney comprising the district of Parramatta. This competition effectively acts as a third grade feeding into the Ron Massey Cup.

==== Teams ====
The lineup for 2025 will have two changes, Guildford & Ryde-Eastwood replace Moorebank and East Hills.

| Colours | Club | NSW Cup/RMC Affiliate | Home ground(s) | Head coach |
|---|---|---|---|---|
| | Guildford Owls | Parramatta Eels | McCredie Park | TBA |
| | Hills District Bulls (C) | | Crestwood Reserve | TBA |
| | Ryde-Eastwood Hawks (C) | | TG Milner Field | TBA |
| | Mount Pritchard Mounties (C) | | Mount Pritchard Community Showground | TBA |
| | Wentworthville Magpies (C) | | Ringrose Park | TBA |

==== Ladder ====
| Pos | Team | Pld | W | D | L | B | PF | PA | PD | Pts | Qualification |
|---|---|---|---|---|---|---|---|---|---|---|---|
| 1 | Mount Pritchard Mounties (C) | 10 | 8 | 0 | 2 | 2 | 264 | 128 | +136 | 32 | Minor Premiers & Major Semi-Final |
| 2 | Wentworthville Magpies (C) | 9 | 5 | 1 | 3 | 3 | 199 | 176 | +23 | 28 | Major Semi-Final |
| 3 | Hills District Bulls (C) | 10 | 3 | 0 | 7 | 3 | 140 | 234 | –94 | 25 | Minor Semi-Final |
| 4 | Guildford Owls | 10 | 4 | 0 | 6 | 2 | 232 | 220 | +12 | 24 | Minor Semi-Final |
| 5 | Ryde-Eastwood Hawks (C) | 9 | 3 | 1 | 5 | 3 | 135 | 212 | –77 | 24 | |

Updated to match(es) played on 1 September. Source:
Rules for classification: 1) points; 2) point difference; 3) points scored

==== Ladder progression ====
- Numbers highlighted in green indicate that the team finished the round inside the top 4.
- Numbers highlighted in blue indicates the team finished first on the ladder in that round.
- Numbers highlighted in red indicates the team finished last place on the ladder in that round.
- Underlined numbers indicate that the team had a bye during that round.

| Pos | Team | 1 | 2 | 3 | 4 | 5 | 6 | 7 | 8 | 9 | 10 | 11 | 12 | 13 | 14 | 15 |
|---|---|---|---|---|---|---|---|---|---|---|---|---|---|---|---|---|
| 1 | Mount Pritchard Mounties (C) | 3 | 6 | 9 | 12 | 15 | 15 | 18 | 19 | 22 | 25 | 28 | 29 | 32 | 32 | 32 |
| 2 | Wentworthville Magpies (C) | 0 | 3 | 5 | 8 | 11 | 11 | 12 | 15 | 18 | 21 | 22 | 25 | 28 | 28 | 28 |
| 3 | Ryde-Eastwood Hawks (C) | 3 | 6 | 8 | 11 | 12 | 12 | 15 | 16 | 17 | 18 | 18 | 21 | 24 | 24 | 25* |
| 4 | Guildford Owls | 3 | 4 | 5 | 6 | 7 | 7 | 8 | 11 | 14 | 17 | 20 | 23 | 24 | 24 | 24 |
| 5 | Hills District Bulls (C) | 1 | 2 | 5 | 6 | 9 | 12 | 15 | 18 | 19 | 20 | 23 | 24 | 25 | 25 | 22* |

- Following the season, the points totals of Ryde-Eastwood & Hills District were adjusted due to unspecified breaches

Season Results:

| Home | Score | Away | Match Information |
| Home | Score | Away | Date and Time | Venue | Referee | Video |
|---|---|---|---|---|---|---|
Round 1
| Hills District Bulls (C) | 14 – 20 | Ryde-Eastwood Hawks (C) | Sunday, 6 April, 12:20pm | Crestwood Reserve | TBA |
| Wentworthville Magpies (C) | 0 – 29* | Mount Pritchard Mounties (C) | N/A |
| Guildford Owls | | BYE |
Round 2
| Ryde-Eastwood Hawks (C) | 24 – 20 | Guildford Owls | Sunday, 13 April, 11:00am | TG Milner Field | TBA |
| Wentworthville Magpies (C) | 36 – 6 | Hills District Bulls (C) | Sunday, 13 April, 11:30am | Ringrose Park | TBA |
| Mount Pritchard Mounties (C) | | BYE |
Round 3
| Guildford Owls | 4 – 24 | Mount Pritchard Mounties (C) | Sunday, 4 May, 3:00pm | McCredie Park | TBA |
| Ryde-Eastwood Hawks (C) | 17 – 17* | Wentworthville Magpies (C) | Washout |
| Hills District Bulls (C) | | BYE |
Round 4
| Hills District Bulls (C) | 10 – 26 | Mount Pritchard Mounties (C) | Sunday, 11 May, 3:00pm | Crestwood Reserve | TBA |
| Wentworthville Magpies (C) | 32 – 18 | Guildford Owls | Sunday, 11 May, 3:00pm | Ringrose Park | TBA |
| Ryde-Eastwood Hawks (C) | | BYE |
Round 5
| Guildford Owls | 16 – 28 | Hills District Bulls (C) | Sunday, 18 May, 3:00pm | McCredie Park | TBA |
| Mount Pritchard Mounties (C) | 24 – 18 | Ryde-Eastwood Hawks (C) | Sunday, 18 May, 3:00pm | Mount Pritchard Community Showground | TBA |
| Wentworthville Magpies (C) | | BYE |
Round 6
| Guildford Owls | V | Wentworthville Magpies (C) | Washout |
| Ryde-Eastwood Hawks (C) | V | Mount Pritchard Mounties (C) | Washout |
| Hills District Bulls (C) | | BYE |
Round 7
| Hills District Bulls (C) | 20 – 16 | Guildford Owls | Sunday, 1 June, 3:00pm | Crestwood Reserve | TBA |
| Wentworthville Magpies (C) | 20 – 30 | Mount Pritchard Mounties (C) | Sunday, 1 June, 3:00pm | Ringrose Park | TBA |
| Ryde-Eastwood Hawks (C) | | BYE |
Round 8
| Mount Pritchard Mounties (C) | 10 – 38 | Guildford Owls | Sunday, 15 June, 3:00pm | Mount Pritchard Community Showground | TBA |
| Ryde-Eastwood Hawks (C) | 6 – 16 | Hills District Bulls (C) | Sunday, 15 June, 3:00pm | TG Milner Field | TBA |
| Wentworthville Magpies (C) | | BYE |
Round 9
| Hills District Bulls (C) | 4 – 22 | Mount Pritchard Mounties (C) | Sunday, 22 June, 3:00pm | Crestwood Reserve | TBA |
| Ryde-Eastwood Hawks (C) | 24 – 26 | Wentworthville Magpies (C) | Sunday, 22 June, 3:00pm | Birchgrove Oval | TBA |
| Guildford Owls | | BYE |
Round 10
| Guildford Owls | 48 – 4 | Ryde-Eastwood Hawks (C) | Sunday, 29 June, 3:00pm | McCredie Park | TBA |
| Wentworthville Magpies (C) | 26 – 14 | Hills District Bulls (C) | Sunday, 29 June, 3:00pm | Ringrose Park | TBA |
| Mount Pritchard Mounties (C) | | BYE |
Round 11
| Wentworthville Magpies (C) | 14 – 22 | Guildford Owls | Sunday, 6 July, 3:00pm | Ringrose Park | TBA |
| Mount Pritchard Mounties (C) | 29* – 0 | Ryde-Eastwood Hawks (C) | N/A |
| Hills District Bulls (C) | | BYE |
Round 12
| Guildford Owls | 44 – 10 | Hills District Bulls (C) | Sunday, 20 July, 3:00pm | McCredie Park | TBA |
| Mount Pritchard Mounties (C) | 16 – 28 | Wentworthville Magpies (C) | Sunday, 20 July, 3:00pm | Mount Pritchard Community Showground | TBA |
| Ryde-Eastwood Hawks (C) | | BYE |
Round 13
| Hills District Bulls (C) | 18 – 22 | Ryde-Eastwood Hawks (C) | Sunday, 27 July, 3:00pm | Crestwood Reserve | TBA |
| Guildford Owls | 6 – 54 | Mount Pritchard Mounties (C) | Sunday, 27 July, 3:00pm | McCredie Park | TBA |
| Wentworthville Magpies (C) | | BYE |
Round 14
| Mount Pritchard Mounties (C) | V | Hills District Bulls (C) | Washout |
| Wentworthville Magpies (C) | V | Ryde-Eastwood Hawks (C) | Washout |
| Guildford Owls | | BYE |
Round 15
| Hills District Bulls (C) | V | Wentworthville Magpies (C) | Washout |
| Ryde-Eastwood Hawks (C) | V | Guildford Owls | Washout |
| Mount Pritchard Mounties (C) | | BYE |
Finals Series
Major & Minor Semi-Finals
| Mount Pritchard Mounties (C) | 10 – 34 | Wentworthville Magpies (C) | Sunday, 17 August, 10:30am | McCredie Park | TBA |
| Ryde-Eastwood Hawks (C) | 22 – 18 | Guildford Owls | Sunday, 17 August, 12:00pm | McCredie Park | TBA |
Preliminary Final
| Mount Pritchard Mounties (C) | 28 – 10 | Ryde-Eastwood Hawks (C) | Sunday, 24 August, 1:30pm | Birchgrove Oval | TBA |
Grand Final
| Wentworthville Magpies (C) | 42 – 12 | Mount Pritchard Mounties (C) | Sunday, 31 August, 3:30pm | Kellyville Park | Liam O'Brien |

==== Grand Final ====
Semi-Finals
1 | Mount Pritchard | 10
2 | Wentworthville | 34
3 | Ryde-Eastwood | 22
4 | Guildford | 18

Preliminary Final
1 | Mount Pritchard | 28
3 | Ryde-Eastwood | 10

Grand Final
2 | Wentworthville | 42
1 | Mount Pritchard | 12

2025 Parramatta Gold Grand Final

Sunday, 31 August 2025
3:30pm

| Wentworthville Magpies (C) | 42 – 12 | Mount Pritchard Mounties (C) |
|---|---|---|
| Tries: Wade Zreika (8', 33') 2 Patrick Taitoko (20') 1 CJ O'Neill (23') 1 Sam Carusi (43') 1 Visiliese Filikitonga (54') 1 Jemaine Nikua (65') 1 Apolosi Laiafi (68') 1 Goals: Zachary Coom 5/8 (9', 21', 45', 56', 70') | 1st: 20 – 6; 2nd: 22 – 6 | Tries: 1 (16') Kirisimasi Panapa; 1 (50') Kye Jones; Goals: 2/2 Tohu-Kadaf Cecil-Hamiora (18', 52') |

Kellyville Park, Sydney
Referee: Liam O'Brien
Touch judges: Bailey Clark & Adam Allouche
In Goal judges: Jazion Semeatu & Marcus Rowe

Team details
| Wentworthville | | Position | Mount Pritchard |
| Name | Number | Position | Number | Name |
|---|---|---|---|---|
| Patrick Taitoko | 1 | Fullback | 1 | Sam Neufeldt |
| George Sukanaivalu | 2 | Wing | 2 | Mauroa Mauroa |
| Harry Williams | 3 | Centre | 3 | Aiman Yaghi |
| Wade Zreika | 4 | Centre | 4 | Josh Leiataua |
| CJ O'Neill | 5 | Wing | 5 | Kye Jones |
| Jake Christian | 6 | Five eighth | 6 | Jaydee Davies |
| Zachary Coom | 7 | Half back | 7 | Tohu-Kadaf Cecil-Hamiroa |
| Pawhare Kershaw | 8 | Prop forward | 8 | Julee-uz Mataio |
| Jason Oxley | 9 | Hooker | 9 | Zayde Sabha |
| Joseph Valu | 10 | Prop forward | 10 | Jackson Parker |
| John Azzopardi | 11 | Second row | 11 | Mohamed El Masri |
| George Karpathios | 12 | Second row | 12 | Kirisimasi Panapa |
| Sam Carusi (c) | 14 | Lock forward | 13 | Brendon Faddoul |
| Gabriel McBride | 13 | Interchange | 14 | Luke Sorensen |
| Jemaine Nikua | 15 | Interchange | 15 | Jordan Jalalaty |
| Visiliese Filikitonga | 16 | Interchange | 16 | Mason Williams |
| Leka Laiafi | 17 | Interchange | 17 | Ricardo Oloapu |
| Matt Pottinger | 19 | Concussion substitute | 18 | Tyrese Fuatimau |
| Lleyton Epere | 20 | Interchange | 19 | Tofu Tuugamusu |
| Robert Lepale | 22 | Interchange |
| Richard Ngawini | | Coach | | Gavin Ngeru |

=== Macarthur Premiership ===
The Macarthur Premiership (named the Wests Group Macarthur Premiership for sponsorship reasons) is a Macarthur based men's first grade rugby league competition that features teams from the former Group 6 and Western Suburbs competitions. This competition feeds into the Ryde-Eastwood Hawks Ron Massey Cup team and the Western Suburbs Magpies New South Wales Cup Team.

==== Teams ====
The lineup will comprise the same teams as 2024.

| Colours | Club | NSW Cup Affiliate | Home ground(s) | Head coach |
|---|---|---|---|---|
| | Camden Rams | Western Suburbs Magpies | Kirkham Oval | TBA |
| | Campbelltown City Kangaroos | Western Suburbs Magpies | Fullwood Reserve | TBA |
| | Campbelltown Collegians | Western Suburbs Magpies | Bradbury Oval | TBA |
| | East Campbelltown Eagles | Western Suburbs Magpies | Waminda Oval | TBA |
| | Mittagong Lions | Western Suburbs Magpies | Mittagong Sports Ground | TBA |
| | Narellan Jets | Western Suburbs Magpies | Narellan Sports Ground | TBA |
| | Oakdale Workers Bears | Western Suburbs Magpies | Sid Sharpe Memorial Oval | TBA |
| | Picton Magpies | Western Suburbs Magpies | Victoria Park | TBA |
| | South West Goannas | Western Suburbs Magpies | Onslow Oval | TBA |
| | The Oaks Tigers | Western Suburbs Magpies | Dudley Chesham Sports Ground | TBA |
| | Thirlmere-Tahmoor Roosters | Western Suburbs Magpies | Thirlmere Sports Ground | TBA |

| State Map | Campbelltown Map |
|---|---|
| Home Venues | Home Venues |

==== Ladder ====
| Pos | Team | Pld | W | D | L | B | PF | PA | PD | Pts | Qualification |
|---|---|---|---|---|---|---|---|---|---|---|---|
| 1 | Camden Rams | 16 | 15 | 0 | 1 | 2 | 598 | 244 | +354 | 34 | Minor Premiers & Major Semi-Final |
| 2 | Campbelltown Collegians | 16 | 12 | 0 | 4 | 2 | 511 | 354 | +155 | 28 | Qualifying Final |
| 3 | Oakdale Workers Bears | 16 | 11 | 0 | 5 | 2 | 402 | 277 | +125 | 26 | Qualifying Final |
| 4 | The Oaks Tigers | 16 | 10 | 1 | 5 | 2 | 523 | 237 | +286 | 25 | Elimination Final |
| 5 | Mittagong Lions | 16 | 9 | 0 | 7 | 2 | 450 | 408 | +42 | 22 | Elimination Final |
| 6 | Campbelltown City Kangaroos | 16 | 8 | 1 | 7 | 2 | 434 | 420 | +14 | 21 | |
| 7 | Picton Magpies | 16 | 7 | 1 | 8 | 2 | 475 | 373 | +102 | 19 | |
| 8 | East Campbelltown Eagles | 16 | 6 | 1 | 9 | 2 | 381 | 490 | -109 | 17 | |
| 9 | Thirlmere-Tahmoor Roosters | 16 | 4 | 0 | 12 | 2 | 362 | 509 | -147 | 12 | |
| 10 | South West Goannas | 16 | 2 | 0 | 14 | 2 | 306 | 658 | -352 | 8 | |
| 11 | Narellan Jets | 16 | 2 | 0 | 14 | 2 | 256 | 726 | -470 | 8 | |

Updated to match(es) played on 1 September. Source:
Rules for classification: 1) points; 2) point difference; 3) points scored

==== Ladder progression ====
- Numbers highlighted in green indicate that the team finished the round inside the top 5.
- Numbers highlighted in blue indicates the team finished first on the ladder in that round.
- Numbers highlighted in red indicates the team finished last place on the ladder in that round.
- Underlined numbers indicate that the team had a bye during that round.

| Pos | Team | 1 | 2 | 3 | 4 | 5 | 6 | 8 | 9 | 10 | 11 | 12 | 7 | 13 | 14 | 15 | 16 | 17 | 18 |
|---|---|---|---|---|---|---|---|---|---|---|---|---|---|---|---|---|---|---|---|
| 1 | Camden Rams | 2 | 4 | 6 | 8 | 10 | 12 | 16 | 18 | 20 | 22 | 24 | 24 | 26 | 26 | 28 | 30 | 32 | 34 |
| 2 | Campbelltown Collegians | 2 | 4 | 4 | 4 | 6 | 8 | 10 | 12 | 14 | 16 | 18 | 18 | 20 | 22 | 22 | 24 | 26 | 28 |
| 3 | Oakdale Workers Bears | 2 | 2 | 4 | 6 | 8 | 8 | 12 | 14 | 16 | 18 | 18 | 18 | 18 | 18 | 20 | 22 | 24 | 26 |
| 4 | The Oaks Tigers | 0 | 0 | 2 | 4 | 6 | 8 | 10 | 14 | 14 | 14 | 16 | 16 | 16 | 18 | 20 | 21 | 23 | 25 |
| 5 | Mittagong Lions | 2 | 4 | 4 | 4 | 6 | 8 | 8 | 8 | 10 | 12 | 14 | 14 | 16 | 18 | 20 | 22 | 22 | 22 |
| 6 | Campbelltown City Kangaroos | 0 | 0 | 2 | 4 | 4 | 6 | 8 | 12 | 12 | 14 | 14 | 14 | 16 | 18 | 20 | 21 | 21 | 21 |
| 7 | Picton Magpies | 0 | 2 | 4 | 6 | 6 | 8 | 8 | 8 | 8 | 10 | 10 | 12 | 14 | 16 | 16 | 16 | 18 | 19 |
| 8 | East Campbelltown Eagles | 0 | 2 | 2 | 2 | 4 | 4 | 6 | 6 | 8 | 8 | 8 | 8 | 10 | 12 | 12 | 14 | 16 | 17 |
| 9 | Thirlmere-Tahmoor Roosters | 2 | 2 | 4 | 4 | 4 | 4 | 6 | 6 | 6 | 6 | 8 | 8 | 10 | 10 | 10 | 10 | 10 | 12 |
| 10 | South West Goannas | 2 | 4 | 4 | 6 | 6 | 6 | 6 | 6 | 6 | 6 | 8 | 8 | 8 | 8 | 8 | 8 | 8 | 8 |
| 11 | Narellan Jets | 0 | 0 | 0 | 0 | 0 | 0 | 0 | 2 | 4 | 4 | 4 | 4 | 6 | 6 | 8 | 8 | 8 | 8 |

Season Results:

| Home | Score | Away | Match Information |
| Home | Score | Away | Date and Time | Venue | Referee | Video |
|---|---|---|---|---|---|---|
Round 1 (Rivalry Round)
| Thirlmere-Tahmoor Roosters | 38 – 20 | Picton Magpies | Saturday, 5 April, 6:00pm | Thirlmere Sports Ground | TBA |
| The Oaks Tigers | 18 – 22 | Oakdale Workers Bears | Sunday, 6 April, 3:00pm | Dudley Chesham Sports Ground | TBA |
| Campbelltown City Kangaroos | 16 – 18 | Mittagong Lions | Sunday, 6 April, 3:00pm | Fullwood Reserve | TBA |
| Camden Rams | 38 – 6 | Narellan Jets | Sunday, 6 April, 3:00pm | Kirkham Oval | TBA |
| East Campbelltown Eagles | 22 – 42 | Campbelltown Collegians | Sunday, 6 April, 3:00pm | Waminda Oval | TBA |
| South West Goannas | | BYE |
Round 2
| Campbelltown Collegians | 22 – 16 | The Oaks Tigers | Sunday, 13 April, 3:00pm | Bradbury Oval | TBA |
| Mittagong Lions | 38 – 30 | Narellan Jets | Sunday, 13 April, 3:00pm | Mittagong Sports Ground | TBA |
| Thirlmere-Tahmoor Roosters | 20 – 28 | South West Goannas | Sunday, 13 April, 3:00pm | Thirlmere Sports Ground | TBA |
| Oakdale Workers Bears | 22 – 36 | Camden Rams | Sunday, 13 April, 3:00pm | Sid Sharpe Memorial Oval | TBA |
| Picton Magpies | 48 – 10 | Campbelltown City Kangaroos | Sunday, 13 April, 3:00pm | Victoria Park | TBA |
| East Campbelltown Eagles | | BYE |
Round 3 (ANZAC Round)
| Campbelltown City Kangaroos | 44 – 22 | South West Goannas | Sunday, 27 April, 3:00pm | Fullwood Reserve | TBA |
| Camden Rams | 40 – 16 | Mittagong Lions | Sunday, 27 April, 3:00pm | Kirkham Oval | TBA |
| Narellan Jets | 26 – 34 | Picton Magpies | Sunday, 27 April, 3:00pm | Narellan Sports Ground | TBA |
| Oakdale Workers Bears | 24 – 16 | Campbelltown Collegians | Sunday, 27 April, 3:00pm | Sid Sharpe Memorial Oval | TBA |
| East Campbelltown Eagles | 28 – 48 | Thirlmere-Tahmoor Roosters | Sunday, 27 April, 3:00pm | Waminda Oval | TBA |
| The Oaks Tigers | | BYE |
Round 4
| Campbelltown Collegians | 28 – 36 | Camden Rams | Sunday, 4 May, 3:00pm | Bradbury Oval | TBA |
| South West Goannas | 36 – 34 | Narellan Jets | Sunday, 4 May, 3:00pm | Onslow Oval | TBA |
| Thirlmere-Tahmoor Roosters | 12 – 42 | The Oaks Tigers | Sunday, 4 May, 3:00pm | Thirlmere Sports Ground | TBA |
| Picton Magpies | 34 – 18 | Mittagong Lions | Sunday, 4 May, 3:00pm | Victoria Park | TBA |
| East Campbelltown Eagles | 14 – 28 | Campbelltown City Kangaroos | Sunday, 4 May, 3:00pm | Waminda Oval | TBA |
| Oakdale Workers Bears | | BYE |
Round 5
| The Oaks Tigers | 46 – 6 | Campbelltown City Kangaroos | Sunday, 11 May, 3:00pm | Dudley Chesham Sports Ground | TBA |
| Camden Rams | 28 – 18 | Picton Magpies | Sunday, 11 May, 3:00pm | Kirkham Oval | TBA |
| Mittagong Lions | 28 – 6 | South West Goannas | Sunday, 11 May, 3:00pm | Mittagong Sports Ground | TBA |
| Narellan Jets | 10 – 30 | East Campbelltown Eagles | Sunday, 11 May, 3:00pm | Narellan Sports Ground | TBA |
| Oakdale Workers Bears | 24 – 18 | Thirlmere-Tahmoor Roosters | Sunday, 11 May, 3:00pm | Sid Sharpe Memorial Oval | TBA |
| Campbelltown Collegians | | BYE |
Round 6
| The Oaks Tigers | 76 – 10 | Narellan Jets | Sunday, 18 May, 3:00pm | Dudley Chesham Sports Ground | TBA |
| Campbelltown City Kangaroos | 34 – 24 | Oakdale Workers Bears | Sunday, 18 May, 3:00pm | Fullwood Reserve | TBA |
| South West Goannas | 18 – 42 | Picton Magpies | Sunday, 18 May, 3:00pm | Onslow Oval | TBA |
| Campbelltown Collegians | 46 – 28 | Thirlmere-Tahmoor Roosters | Sunday, 18 May, 3:00pm | Bradbury Oval | TBA |
| East Campbelltown Eagles | 10 – 42 | Mittagong Lions | Sunday, 18 May, 3:00pm | Waminda Oval | TBA |
| Camden Rams | | BYE |
Round 7
| Camden Rams | 42 – 34 | South West Goannas | Sunday, 25 May, 3:00pm | Kirkham Oval | TBA |
| Oakdale Workers Bears | 50 – 0 | Narellan Jets | Sunday, 25 May, 3:00pm | Sid Sharpe Memorial Oval | TBA |
| Campbelltown Collegians | 20 – 30 | Campbelltown City Kangaroos | Sunday, 8 June, 3:00pm | Bradbury Oval | TBA |
| Mittagong Lions | 10 – 42 | The Oaks Tigers | Sunday, 8 June, 3:00pm | Mittagong Sports Ground | TBA |
| Picton Magpies | 32 – 26 | East Campbelltown Eagles | Sunday, 20 July, 3:00pm | Victoria Park | TBA |
| Thirlmere-Tahmoor Roosters | | BYE |
Round 8
| The Oaks Tigers | 30 – 16 | Picton Magpies | Sunday, 1 June, 3:00pm | Dudley Chesham Sports Ground | TBA |
| Narellan Jets | 16 – 50 | Campbelltown Collegians | Sunday, 1 June, 3:00pm | Narellan Sports Ground | TBA |
| Oakdale Workers Bears | 34 – 16 | Mittagong Lions | Sunday, 1 June, 3:00pm | Sid Sharpe Memorial Oval | TBA |
| Thirlmere-Tahmoor Roosters | 12 – 50 | Camden Rams | Sunday, 1 June, 3:00pm | Thirlmere Sports Ground | TBA |
| East Campbelltown Eagles | 36 – 26 | South West Goannas | Sunday, 1 June, 3:00pm | Waminda Oval | TBA |
| Campbelltown City Kangaroos | | BYE |
Round 9
| Campbelltown Collegians | 48 – 16 | Mittagong Lions | Sunday, 15 June, 3:00pm | Bradbury Oval | TBA |
| Camden Rams | 34 – 6 | East Campbelltown Eagles | Sunday, 15 June, 3:00pm | Kirkham Oval | TBA |
| South West Goannas | 16 – 40 | The Oaks Tigers | Sunday, 15 June, 3:00pm | Onslow Oval | TBA |
| Thirlmere-Tahmoor Roosters | 18 – 30 | Campbelltown City Kangaroos | Sunday, 15 June, 3:00pm | Thirlmere Sports Ground | TBA |
| Picton Magpies | 12 – 34 | Oakdale Workers Bears | Sunday, 15 June, 3:00pm | Victoria Park | TBA |
| Narellan Jets | | BYE |
Round 10
| Campbelltown Collegians | 34 – 16 | Picton Magpies | Sunday, 22 June, 3:00pm | Bradbury Oval | TBA |
| The Oaks Tigers | 23 – 25 | East Campbelltown Eagles | Sunday, 22 June, 3:00pm | Dudley Chesham Sports Ground | TBA |
| Campbelltown City Kangaroos | 16 – 42 | Camden Rams | Sunday, 22 June, 3:00pm | Fullwood Reserve | TBA |
| Narellan Jets | 44 – 28 | Thirlmere-Tahmoor Roosters | Sunday, 22 June, 3:00pm | Narellan Sports Ground | TBA |
| Oakdale Workers Bears | 46 – 12 | South West Goannas | Sunday, 22 June, 3:00pm | Sid Sharpe Memorial Oval | TBA |
| Mittagong Lions | | BYE |
Round 11
| Campbelltown City Kangaroos | 48 – 8 | Narellan Jets | Sunday, 29 June, 3:00pm | Fullwood Reserve | TBA |
| Camden Rams | 28 – 18 | The Oaks Tigers | Sunday, 29 June, 3:00pm | Kirkham Oval | TBA |
| Mittagong Lions | 76 – 10 | Thirlmere-Tahmoor Roosters | Sunday, 29 June, 3:00pm | Mittagong Sports Ground | TBA |
| South West Goannas | 28 – 42 | Campbelltown Collegians | Sunday, 29 June, 3:00pm | Onslow Oval | TBA |
| East Campbelltown Eagles | 22 – 40 | Oakdale Workers Bears | Sunday, 29 June, 3:00pm | Waminda Oval | TBA |
| Picton Magpies | | BYE |
Round 12 (Rivalry Round)
| Campbelltown Collegians | 44 – 10 | East Campbelltown Eagles | Sunday, 6 July, 3:00pm | Bradbury Oval | TBA |
| Mittagong Lions | 36 – 26 | Campbelltown City Kangaroos | Sunday, 6 July, 3:00pm | Mittagong Sports Ground | TBA |
| Narellan Jets | 6 – 78 | Camden Rams | Sunday, 6 July, 3:00pm | Narellan Sports Ground | TBA |
| Oakdale Workers Bears | 4 – 28 | The Oaks Tigers | Sunday, 6 July, 3:00pm | Sid Sharpe Memorial Oval | TBA |
| Picton Magpies | 24 – 26 | Thirlmere-Tahmoor Roosters | Sunday, 6 July, 3:00pm | Victoria Park | TBA |
| South West Goannas | | BYE |
Round 13
| The Oaks Tigers | 10 – 16 | Campbelltown Collegians | Sunday, 20 July, 3:00pm | Dudley Chesham Sports Ground | TBA |
| Camden Rams | 6 – 0 | Oakdale Workers Bears | Sunday, 20 July, 3:00pm | Kirkham Oval | TBA |
| South West Goannas | 8 – 44 | Thirlmere-Tahmoor Roosters | Sunday, 20 July, 3:00pm | Onslow Oval | TBA |
| Campbelltown City Kangaroos | BYE | Mittagong Lions |
| Narellan Jets | BYE | Picton Magpies |
| East Campbelltown Eagles | BYE |
Round 14
| Campbelltown Collegians | 25 – 24 | Oakdale Workers Bears | Sunday, 27 July, 3:00pm | Bradbury Oval | TBA |
| Mittagong Lions | 26 – 18 | Camden Rams | Sunday, 27 July, 3:00pm | Mittagong Sports Ground | TBA |
| South West Goannas | 12 – 40 | Campbelltown City Kangaroos | Sunday, 27 July, 3:00pm | Onslow Oval | TBA |
| Thirlmere-Tahmoor Roosters | 22 – 35 | East Campbelltown Eagles | Sunday, 27 July, 3:00pm | Thirlmere Sports Ground | TBA |
| Picton Magpies | 74 – 16 | Narellan Jets | Sunday, 27 July, 3:00pm | Victoria Park | TBA |
| The Oaks Tigers | | BYE |
Round 15
| Campbelltown City Kangaroos | 40 – 24 | East Campbelltown Eagles | Sunday, 3 August, 3:00pm | Waminda Oval | TBA |
| Mittagong Lions | 24 – 14 | Picton Magpies | Sunday, 3 August, 3:00pm | Mittagong Sports Ground | TBA |
| Camden Rams | 34 – 12 | Campbelltown Collegians | Sunday, 3 August, 3:00pm | Kirkham Oval | TBA |
| Narellan Jets | 28 – 26 | South West Goannas | Sunday, 3 August, 3:00pm | Narellan Sports Ground | TBA |
| The Oaks Tigers | 0* – 0 | Thirlmere-Tahmoor Roosters | N/A |
| Oakdale Workers Bears | | BYE |
Round 16
| Campbelltown City Kangaroos | 26 – 26 | The Oaks Tigers | Sunday, 10 August, 3:00pm | Fullwood Reserve | TBA |
| South West Goannas | 16 – 42 | Mittagong Lions | Sunday, 10 August, 3:00pm | Onslow Oval | TBA |
| Thirlmere-Tahmoor Roosters | 14 – 30 | Oakdale Workers Bears | Sunday, 10 August, 3:00pm | Thirlmere Sports Ground | TBA |
| Picton Magpies | 12 – 22 | Camden Rams | Sunday, 10 August, 3:00pm | Victoria Park | TBA |
| East Campbelltown Eagles | 44 – 22 | Narellan Jets | Sunday, 10 August, 3:00pm | Waminda Oval | TBA |
| Campbelltown Collegians | | BYE |
Round 17
| Thirlmere-Tahmoor Roosters | 24 – 26 | Campbelltown Collegians | Sunday, 17 August, 3:00pm | Thirlmere Sports Ground | TBA |
| Mittagong Lions | 20 – 32 | East Campbelltown Eagles | Sunday, 17 August, 3:00pm | Mittagong Sports Ground | TBA |
| Narellan Jets | 0 – 76 | The Oaks Tigers | Sunday, 17 August, 3:00pm | Narellan Sports Ground | TBA |
| Oakdale Workers Bears | 24 – 20 | Campbelltown City Kangaroos | Sunday, 17 August, 3:00pm | Sid Sharpe Memorial Oval | TBA |
| Picton Magpies | 62 – 6 | South West Goannas | Sunday, 17 August, 3:00pm | Victoria Park | TBA |
| Camden Rams | | BYE |
Round 18
| South West Goannas | 12 – 66 | Camden Rams | Sunday, 24 August, 11:45am | Kirkham Oval | TBA |
| The Oaks Tigers | 32 – 24 | Mittagong Lions | Sunday, 24 August, 1:15pm | Kirkham Oval | TBA |
| Campbelltown City Kangaroos | 20 – 38 | Campbelltown Collegians | Sunday, 24 August, 3:00pm | Kirkham Oval | TBA |
| East Campbelltown Eagles | 17 – 17* | Picton Magpies | N/A |
| Narellan Jets | 0 – 0* | Oakdale Workers Bears | N/A |
| Thirlmere-Tahmoor Roosters | | BYE |
Finals Series
Qualifying & Elimination Finals
| The Oaks Tigers | 30 – 10 | Mittagong Lions | Sunday, 31 August, 1:15pm | Waminda Oval | TBA |
| Campbelltown Collegians | 14 – 50 | Oakdale Workers Bears | Sunday, 31 August, 3:00pm | Waminda Oval | TBA |
Major & Minor Semi-Finals
| Campbelltown Collegians | 32 – 14 | The Oaks Tigers | Sunday, 7 September, 1:15pm | Kirkham Oval | TBA |
| Camden Rams | 22 – 18 | Oakdale Workers Bears | Sunday, 7 September, 3:00pm | Kirkham Oval | TBA |
Preliminary Final
| Oakdale Workers Bears | 22 – 32 | Campbelltown Collegians | Sunday, 14 September, 3:00pm | Dudley Chesham Sports Ground | TBA |
Grand Final
| Camden Rams | V | Campbelltown Collegians | Sunday, 21 September, 3:15pm | Campbelltown Sports Stadium | TBA |

==== Grand Final ====
Qualifying & Elimination Finals
2 | Campbelltown | 14
3 | Oakdale Workers | 50
4 | The Oaks | 30
5 | Mittagong | 10

Major Semi-Final
1 | Camden | 22
3 | Oakdale Workers | 18
Minor Semi-Final
2 | Campbelltown | 32
4 | The Oaks | 14

Preliminary Final
3 | Oakdale Workers | 22
2 | Campbelltown | 32

Grand Final
1 | Camden
2 | Campbelltown

2025 Macarthur Premiership Grand Final

Sunday, 21 September 2025
3:15pm

| Camden Rams | v | Campbelltown Collegians |

Campbelltown Sports Stadium, Sydney

=== South Sydney Premiership ===
The South Sydney Premiership is a Sydney based men's first grade rugby league competition that features teams from the South Sydney district. This competition feeds into the South Sydney Rabbitohs New South Wales Cup team.

==== Teams ====
There is only 1 change in 2024 with La Perouse replacing Matraville.

| Colours | Club | NSW Cup Affiliate | Home ground(s) | Head coach |
|---|---|---|---|---|
| | Alexandria Rovers | South Sydney Rabbitohs | Erskineville Oval | TBA |
| | Coogee Dolphins | South Sydney Rabbitohs | Kensington Oval | TBA |
| | Coogee-Randwick Wombats | South Sydney Rabbitohs | Marcellin Fields | TBA |
| | Marrickville RSL Kings | South Sydney Rabbitohs | Marrickville Oval | TBA |
| | Mascot Jets | South Sydney Rabbitohs | Mascot Oval | TBA |
| | La Perouse Panthers | South Sydney Rabbitohs | Yarra Oval | TBA |
| | Redfern All Blacks | South Sydney Rabbitohs | Waterloo Oval | TBA |
| | South Eastern Seagulls | South Sydney Rabbitohs | Pioneers Park | TBA |

==== Ladder ====
| Pos | Team | Pld | W | D | L | B | PF | PA | PD | Pts | Qualification |
|---|---|---|---|---|---|---|---|---|---|---|---|
| 1 | La Perouse Panthers | 13 | 11 | 1 | 1 | 0 | 324 | 132 | +192 | 23 | Minor Premiers & Major Semi-Final |
| 2 | Redfern All Blacks | 13 | 10 | 0 | 3 | 0 | 316 | 204 | +112 | 20 | Qualifying Final |
| 3 | Coogee-Randwick Wombats | 13 | 8 | 1 | 4 | 0 | 312 | 228 | +84 | 17 | Qualifying Final |
| 4 | Coogee Dolphins | 13 | 8 | 0 | 5 | 0 | 314 | 216 | +98 | 16 | Elimination Final |
| 5 | Mascot Jets | 13 | 8 | 0 | 5 | 0 | 324 | 272 | +52 | 16 | Elimination Final |
| 6 | Alexandria Rovers | 13 | 3 | 3 | 7 | 0 | 232 | 278 | –46 | 9 | |
| 7 | South Eastern Seagulls | 13 | 1 | 1 | 11 | 0 | 208 | 354 | -146 | 3 | |
| 8 | Marrickville RSL Kings | 13 | 0 | 0 | 13 | 0 | 112 | 458 | -346 | 0 | |

Updated to match(es) played on 1 September. Source:
Rules for classification: 1) points; 2) point difference; 3) points scored

==== Ladder progression ====
- Numbers highlighted in green indicate that the team finished the round inside the top 5.
- Numbers highlighted in blue indicates the team finished first on the ladder in that round.
- Numbers highlighted in red indicates the team finished last place on the ladder in that round.
- Underlined numbers indicate that the team had a bye during that round.

| Pos | Team | 1 | 2 | 4 | 5 | 6 | 7 | 8 | 9 | 10 | 11 | 12 | 3 | 13 | 14 | 15 |
|---|---|---|---|---|---|---|---|---|---|---|---|---|---|---|---|---|
| 1 | La Perouse Panthers | 2 | 4 | 6 | 6 | 8 | 8 | 10 | 12 | 14 | 16 | 18 | 19 | 21 | 23 | 23 |
| 2 | Redfern All Blacks | 2 | 2 | 6 | 8 | 10 | 10 | 12 | 12 | 14 | 16 | 16 | 16 | 18 | 20 | 20 |
| 3 | Coogee-Randwick Wombats | 2 | 4 | 8 | 10 | 10 | 10 | 11 | 13 | 15 | 17 | 17 | 17 | 17 | 17 | 17 |
| 4 | Coogee Dolphins | 2 | 2 | 4 | 6 | 8 | 8 | 10 | 10 | 10 | 12 | 14 | 14 | 16 | 16 | 16 |
| 5 | Mascot Jets | 0 | 2 | 2 | 2 | 4 | 4 | 4 | 6 | 8 | 8 | 10 | 12 | 14 | 16 | 16 |
| 6 | Alexandria Rovers | 0 | 2 | 2 | 3 | 3 | 3 | 4 | 6 | 6 | 6 | 8 | 9 | 9 | 9 | 9 |
| 7 | South Eastern Seagulls | 0 | 0 | 0 | 1 | 1 | 1 | 1 | 1 | 1 | 1 | 1 | 1 | 1 | 3 | 3 |
| 8 | Marrickville RSL Kings | 0 | 0 | 0 | 0 | 0 | 0 | 0 | 0 | 0 | 0 | 0 | 0 | 0 | 0 | 0 |

Season Results:

| Home | Score | Away | Match Information |
| Home | Score | Away | Date and Time | Venue | Referee | Video |
|---|---|---|---|---|---|---|
Round 1
| South Eastern Seagulls | 14 – 24 | Redfern All Blacks | Saturday, 5 April, 3:00pm | Pioneers Park | TBA |
| La Perouse Panthers | 56 – 0 | Marrickville RSL Kings | Saturday, 5 April, 3:00pm | Yarra Oval | TBA |
| Alexandria Rovers | 6 – 42 | Coogee-Randwick Wombats | Sunday, 6 April, 2:30pm | Erskineville Oval | TBA |
| Coogee Dolphins | 36 – 16 | Mascot Jets | Sunday, 6 April, 2:30pm | Kensington Oval | TBA |
Round 2
| Coogee-Randwick Wombats | 30 – 16 | South Eastern Seagulls | Saturday, 12 April, 3:00pm | Marcellin Fields | TBA |
| Marrickville RSL Kings | 14 – 36 | Alexandria Rovers | Saturday, 12 April, 3:00pm | Marrickville Oval | TBA |
| La Perouse Panthers | 18 – 16 | Coogee Dolphins | Sunday, 13 April, 2:50pm | Yarra Oval | TBA |
| Mascot Jets | 18 – 12 | Redfern All Blacks | Sunday, 13 April, 2:50pm | Mascot Oval | TBA |
Round 3 (ANZAC Round)
| Coogee-Randwick Wombats | 26 – 16 | Coogee Dolphins | Saturday, 26 April, 3:00pm | Marcellin Fields | TBA |
| Redfern All Blacks | 40 – 6 | Marrickville RSL Kings | Saturday, 26 April, 3:00pm | Marrickville Oval | TBA |
| Alexandria Rovers | 12 – 12 | La Perouse Panthers | Sunday, 13 July, 2:30pm | Erskineville Oval | TBA |
| Mascot Jets | 34 – 16 | South Eastern Seagulls | Sunday, 13 July, 3:00pm | Mascot Oval | TBA |
Round 4
| Coogee Dolphins | 34 – 12 | South Eastern Seagulls | Saturday, 3 May, 3:00pm | Kensington Oval | TBA |
| Mascot Jets | 16 – 18 | La Perouse Panthers | Saturday, 3 May, 3:00pm | Mascot Oval | TBA |
| Alexandria Rovers | 6 – 34 | Redfern All Blacks | Sunday, 4 May, 2:30pm | Erskineville Oval | TBA |
| Marrickville RSL Kings | 0 – 30* | Coogee-Randwick Wombats | N/A |
Round 5
| Mascot Jets | 16 – 28 | Coogee-Randwick Wombats | Saturday, 10 May, 3:00pm | Mascot Oval | TBA |
| La Perouse Panthers | 26 – 28 | Redfern All Blacks | Saturday, 10 May, 3:00pm | Erskineville Oval | TBA |
| Coogee Dolphins | 40 – 4 | Marrickville RSL Kings | Sunday, 11 May, 2:30pm | Kensington Oval | TBA |
| South Eastern Seagulls | 24 – 24 | Alexandria Rovers | Sunday, 11 May, 2:30pm | Pioneers Park | TBA |
Round 6
| Alexandria Rovers | 16 – 26 | Coogee Dolphins | Saturday, 17 May, 3:00pm | Erskineville Oval | TBA |
| South Eastern Seagulls | 0 – 28 | La Perouse Panthers | Saturday, 17 May, 3:00pm | Pioneers Park | TBA |
| Coogee-Randwick Wombats | 10 – 22 | Redfern All Blacks | Sunday, 18 May, 2:30pm | Marcellin Fields | TBA |
| Marrickville RSL Kings | 18 – 52 | Mascot Jets | Sunday, 18 May, 2:30pm | Marrickville Oval | TBA |
Round 7
| Alexandria Rovers | V | Mascot Jets | Washout |
| Marrickville RSL Kings | V | South Eastern Seagulls | Washout |
| Coogee-Randwick Wombats | V | La Perouse Panthers | Washout |
| Redfern All Blacks | V | Coogee Dolphins | Washout |
Round 8
| Coogee-Randwick Wombats | 16 – 16 | Alexandria Rovers | Saturday, 31 May, 3:00pm | Marcellin Fields | TBA |
| Mascot Jets | 30 – 50 | Coogee Dolphins | Saturday, 31 May, 3:00pm | Mascot Oval | TBA |
| Marrickville RSL Kings | 4 – 12 | La Perouse Panthers | Sunday, 1 June, 2:30pm | Marrickville Oval | TBA |
| Redfern All Blacks | 36 – 26 | South Eastern Seagulls | Sunday, 1 June, 2:30pm | Waterloo Oval | TBA |
Round 9
| Coogee Dolphins | 12 – 20 | La Perouse Panthers | Saturday, 14 June, 3:00pm | Kensington Oval | TBA |
| Redfern All Blacks | 18 – 26 | Mascot Jets | Saturday, 14 June, 3:00pm | Waterloo Oval | TBA |
| Alexandria Rovers | 28 – 4 | Marrickville RSL Kings | Sunday, 15 June, 2:30pm | Erskineville Oval | TBA |
| South Eastern Seagulls | 16 – 34 | Coogee-Randwick Wombats | Sunday, 15 June, 2:30pm | Pioneers Park | TBA |
Round 10
| South Eastern Seagulls | 16 – 18 | Mascot Jets | Saturday, 21 June, 3:00pm | Pioneers Park | TBA |
| La Perouse Panthers | 26 – 18 | Alexandria Rovers | Saturday, 21 June, 3:00pm | Yarra Oval | TBA |
| Coogee Dolphins | 6 – 26 | Coogee-Randwick Wombats | Sunday, 22 June, 2:30pm | Coogee Oval | TBA |
| Redfern All Blacks | 34 – 18 | Marrickville RSL Kings | Sunday, 22 June, 2:30pm | Redfern Oval | TBA |
Round 11
| Coogee-Randwick Wombats | 44 – 24 | Marrickville RSL Kings | Saturday, 28 June, 3:00pm | Marcellin Fields | TBA |
| Redfern All Blacks | 16 – 12 | Alexandria Rovers | Saturday, 28 June, 3:00pm | Erskineville Oval | TBA |
| South Eastern Seagulls | 22 – 24 | Coogee Dolphins | Sunday, 29 June, 2:30pm | Pioneers Park | TBA |
| La Perouse Panthers | 32 – 4 | Mascot Jets | Sunday, 29 June, 2:30pm | Yarra Oval | TBA |
Round 12
| Alexandria Rovers | 26 – 12 | South Eastern Seagulls | Saturday, 5 July, 3:00pm | Erskineville Oval | TBA |
| Marrickville RSL Kings | 4 – 32 | Coogee Dolphins | Saturday, 5 July, 3:00pm | Marrickville Oval | TBA |
| Coogee-Randwick Wombats | 10 – 28 | Mascot Jets | Sunday, 6 July, 2:30pm | Marcellin Fields | TBA |
| La Perouse Panthers | 20 – 12 | Redfern All Blacks | Sunday, 6 July, 2:30pm | Yarra Oval | TBA |
Round 13
| Redfern All Blacks | 32 – 16 | Coogee-Randwick Wombats | Saturday, 19 July, 3:00pm | Waterloo Oval | TBA |
| Coogee Dolphins | 16 – 14 | Alexandria Rovers | Sunday, 20 July, 2:30pm | Kensington Oval | TBA |
| La Perouse Panthers | 26 – 10 | South Eastern Seagulls | Sunday, 20 July, 2:30pm | Yarra Oval | TBA |
| Mascot Jets | 30* – 0 | Marrickville RSL Kings | N/A |
Round 14
| Coogee Dolphins | 6 – 8 | Redfern All Blacks | Saturday, 26 July, 3:00pm | Kensington Oval | TBA |
| La Perouse Panthers | 30 – 0 | Coogee-Randwick Wombats | Saturday, 26 July, 3:00pm | Yarra Oval | TBA |
| Mascot Jets | 36 – 18 | Alexandria Rovers | Sunday, 27 July, 2:30pm | Mascot Oval | TBA |
| South Eastern Seagulls | 24 – 16 | Marrickville RSL Kings | Sunday, 27 July, 2:30pm | Pioneers Park | TBA |
Round 15
| Alexandria Rovers | V | Coogee-Randwick Wombats | Washout |
| Marrickville RSL Kings | V | La Perouse Panthers | Washout |
| Mascot Jets | V | Coogee Dolphins | Washout |
| South Eastern Seagulls | V | Redfern All Blacks | Washout |
Finals Series
Qualifying & Elimination Finals
| Coogee Dolphins | 2 – 8 | Mascot Jets | Saturday, 9 August, 2:40pm | Erskineville Oval | TBA |
| Redfern All Blacks | 10 – 24 | Coogee-Randwick Wombats | Saturday, 9 August, 2:45pm | Mascot Oval | TBA |
Major & Minor Semi-Finals
| Redfern All Blacks | 14 – 28 | Mascot Jets | Sunday, 17 August, 1:20pm | Redfern Oval | TBA |
| La Perouse Panthers | 32 – 18 | Coogee-Randwick Wombats | Sunday, 17 August, 2:50pm | Redfern Oval | TBA |
Preliminary Final
| Coogee-Randwick Wombats | 26 – 22 | Mascot Jets | Sunday, 24 August, 3:00pm | Marcellin Fields | TBA |
Grand Final
| La Perouse Panthers | 14 – 8 | Coogee-Randwick Wombats | Sunday, 31 August, 3:00pm | Redfern Oval | Matt Rossleigh |

==== Grand Final ====
Qualifying & Elimination Finals
2 | Redfern | 10
3 | Coogee-Randwick | 24
4 | Coogee | 2
5 | Mascot | 8

Major Semi-Final
1 | La Perouse | 32
3 | Coogee-Randwick | 18
Minor Semi-Final
2 | Redfern | 14
5 | Mascot | 28

Preliminary Final
3 | Coogee-Randwick | 26
5 | Mascot | 22

Grand Final
1 | La Perouse | 14
3 | Coogee-Randwick | 8

2025 South Sydney Premiership Grand Final

Sunday, 31 August 2025
3:00pm

| La Perouse Panthers | 14 – 8 | Coogee-Randwick Wombats |
|---|---|---|
| Tries: Corey Makelim (5') 1 Jayden Rooke (34') 1 Robert Simpson (62') 1 Goals: Archie Donnelly 1/1 (60'p); Harley Attwater 0/3 | 1st: 8 – 0; 2nd: 6 – 8 | Tries: 1 (37') Luke Hennessy; 1 (66') Sam Taylor; Goals: 0/2 Jake Tobin |

Redfern Oval, Sydney
Referee: Matt Rossleigh

Team details
| La Perouse | | Position | Coogee-Randwick |
| Name | Number | Position | Number | Name |
|---|---|---|---|---|
| Jade Anderson | 1 | Fullback | 8 | Jake Tobin |
| Saxon Lester | 2 | Wing | 2 | Tahi Sue |
| Jayden Rooke | 3 | Centre | 3 | Clayton McGoon |
| Corey Makelim | 4 | Centre | 4 | Luke Hennessy |
| Cody King-Pittman | 5 | Wing | 5 | Bailey Lam |
| Lindsay Munro | 6 | Five eighth | 6 | Harrison Marsh |
| Harley Attwater | 7 | Half back | 7 | Daniel Mougios |
| Allen Campbell | 8 | Prop forward | 22 | Jake Roberts |
| Aaron Grech | 9 | Hooker | 9 | Sam Taylor |
| Ryan Archer | 10 | Prop forward | 20 | Lukas Margaritis |
| Kayde King | 11 | Second row | 11 | Zach Kambos |
| Jack Beetson | 12 | Second row | 21 | Michael Mitsias |
| Damon Alley-Tovio | 13 | Lock forward | 13 | Ethan Le Blanc (c) |
| Archie Donnelly | 14 | Interchange | 10 | Sam Watts |
| James Garlick | 15 | Interchange | 12 | James Kokkinos |
| Robert Simpson | 16 | Interchange | 14 | Shaun Dowie |
| Kory Taaffe | 17 | Interchange | 17 | Cash Adams |
| Daniel Rafty | 18 | Concussion substitute | 18 | Corey Stevens |
| Harrison Rooke | 19 | Interchange | 19 | Patrick Rabbitt |
| Toby Key | 24 | Interchange | 23 | Costa Sanidas |
| Dylan Alaalatoa | 25 | Interchange |
| Robert Longbottom | | Coach | | Jason McKell |

== Northern Corridor Region ==
=== Central Coast Premiership ===
The Central Coast Premiership is a Central Coast based men's first grade rugby league competition that features teams from the Central Coast district. This competition indirectly feeds into the Sydney Roosters New South Wales Cup team.

==== Teams ====
There are two confirmed change for 2025 with Ourimbah-Wyoming rejoining the First Grade competition in place of Dora Creek.

| Colours | Club | NSW Cup Affiliate | Home ground(s) | Head coach |
|---|---|---|---|---|
| | Berkeley Vale Panthers | Sydney Roosters | Ted Doyle Oval | TBA |
| | Erina Eagles | Sydney Roosters | Erina Oval | TBA |
| | Kincumber Colts | Sydney Roosters | MacKillop Oval | TBA |
| | Ourimbah-Wyoming Magpies | Sydney Roosters | Bill Sohier Park | TBA |
| | Terrigal Sharks | Sydney Roosters | Duffys Road Oval | TBA |
| | The Entrance Tigers (R) | | EDSACC Oval | TBA |
| | Toukley Hawks | Sydney Roosters | Darren Kennedy Oval | TBA |
| | Woy Woy Roosters | Sydney Roosters | Woy Woy Oval | TBA |
| | Wyong Roos (R) | | Morry Breen Oval | TBA |

| State Map | Wyong Map |
|---|---|
| Home Venues | Home Venues |

==== Ladder ====
| Pos | Team | Pld | W | D | L | B | PF | PA | PD | Pts | Qualification |
|---|---|---|---|---|---|---|---|---|---|---|---|
| 1 | Erina Eagles | 14 | 12 | 1 | 1 | 2 | 406 | 144 | +262 | 29 | Minor Premiers & Major Semi-Final |
| 2 | Toukley Hawks | 15 | 11 | 0 | 4 | 2 | 356 | 158 | +198 | 24 | Major Semi-Final |
| 3 | Kincumber Colts | 14 | 9 | 1 | 4 | 2 | 388 | 212 | +176 | 23 | Minor Semi-Final |
| 4 | Wyong Roos (R) | 14 | 9 | 0 | 5 | 2 | 362 | 208 | +154 | 22 | Minor Semi-Final |
| 5 | The Entrance Tigers (R) | 14 | 8 | 0 | 6 | 2 | 292 | 216 | +76 | 20 | |
| 6 | Woy Woy Roosters | 14 | 7 | 0 | 7 | 2 | 382 | 330 | +52 | 18 | |
| 7 | Ourimbah-Wyoming Magpies | 14 | 4 | 0 | 10 | 2 | 271 | 406 | -135 | 12 | |
| 8 | Terrigal Sharks | 14 | 2 | 0 | 12 | 2 | 132 | 566 | -434 | 8 | |
| 9 | Berkeley Vale Panthers | 15 | 1 | 0 | 14 | 2 | 186 | 535 | -349 | 4 | |

Updated to match(es) played on 1 September. Source:
Rules for classification: 1) points; 2) point difference; 3) points scored

==== Ladder progression ====
- Numbers highlighted in green indicate that the team finished the round inside the top 4.
- Numbers highlighted in blue indicates the team finished first on the ladder in that round.
- Numbers highlighted in red indicates the team finished last place on the ladder in that round.
- Underlined numbers indicate that the team had a bye during that round.

| Pos | Team | 1 | 2 | 5 | 3 | 8 | 9 | 10 | 11 | 12 | 13 | 14 | 6 | 15 | 16 | 17 | 4 | 18 | 7 |
|---|---|---|---|---|---|---|---|---|---|---|---|---|---|---|---|---|---|---|---|
| 1 | Erina Eagles | 2 | 4 | 8 | 10 | 12 | 14 | 15 | 17 | 19 | 21 | 21 | 23 | 23 | 23 | 25 | 25 | 27 | 29 |
| 2 | Toukley Hawks | 0 | 2 | 6 | 6 | 8 | 10 | 12 | 12 | 14 | 14 | 16 | 18 | 18 | 18 | 20 | 20 | 22 | 24 |
| 3 | Kincumber Colts | 2 | 4 | 4 | 4 | 6 | 8 | 9 | 11 | 13 | 15 | 17 | 17 | 17 | 17 | 17 | 19 | 21 | 23 |
| 4 | Wyong Roos (R) | 2 | 2 | 6 | 8 | 8 | 10 | 10 | 12 | 14 | 14 | 14 | 16 | 16 | 16 | 18 | 18 | 20 | 22 |
| 5 | The Entrance Tigers (R) | 2 | 4 | 4 | 6 | 8 | 8 | 10 | 10 | 12 | 14 | 16 | 18 | 18 | 18 | 20 | 20 | 20 | 20 |
| 6 | Woy Woy Roosters | 0 | 0 | 2 | 4 | 4 | 6 | 6 | 8 | 8 | 10 | 12 | 14 | 14 | 14 | 16 | 16 | 16 | 18 |
| 7 | Ourimbah-Wyoming Magpies | 0 | 2 | 2 | 2 | 4 | 4 | 6 | 6 | 6 | 8 | 10 | 10 | 10 | 10 | 10 | 10 | 12 | 12 |
| 8 | Terrigal Sharks | 0 | 0 | 2 | 4 | 4 | 4 | 6 | 8 | 8 | 8 | 8 | 8 | 8 | 8 | 8 | 8 | 8 | 8 |
| 9 | Berkeley Vale Panthers | 2 | 2 | 4 | 4 | 4 | 4 | 4 | 4 | 4 | 4 | 4 | 4 | 4 | 4 | 4 | 4 | 4 | 4 |

Season Results:

| Home | Score | Away | Match Information |
| Home | Score | Away | Date and Time | Venue | Referee | Video |
|---|---|---|---|---|---|---|
Round 1
| Ourimbah-Wyoming Magpies | 10 – 22 | The Entrance Tigers (R) | Saturday, 5 April, 3:05pm | Bill Sohier Park | Deacon Cameron |
| Toukley Hawks | 6 – 24 | Erina Eagles | Saturday, 5 April, 3:05pm | Darren Kennedy Oval | Flynn Cernoy |
| Kincumber Colts | 60 – 0 | Terrigal Sharks | Saturday, 5 April, 3:05pm | MacKillop Oval | Callum Richardson |
| Woy Woy Roosters | 26 – 28 | Wyong Roos (R) | Sunday, 6 April, 3:05pm | Woy Woy Oval | Ben Thompson |
| Berkeley Vale Panthers | | BYE |
Round 2
| Berkeley Vale Panthers | 16 – 22 | Toukley Hawks | Sunday, 13 April, 3:05pm | Ted Doyle Oval | Callum Richardson |
| The Entrance Tigers (R) | 24 – 6 | Terrigal Sharks | Sunday, 13 April, 3:05pm | EDSACC Oval | Flynn Cernoy |
| Erina Eagles | 30 – 6 | Woy Woy Roosters | Sunday, 13 April, 3:05pm | Erina Oval | Ben Thompson |
| Wyong Roos (R) | 14 – 18 | Kincumber Colts | Sunday, 13 April, 3:05pm | Morry Breen Oval | Deacon Cameron |
| Ourimbah-Wyoming Magpies | | BYE |
Round 3
| Ourimbah-Wyoming Magpies | 0 – 38 | Erina Eagles | Sunday, 1 June, 3:05pm | Bill Sohier Park | TBA |
| Toukley Hawks | 8 – 16 | Wyong Roos (R) | Sunday, 1 June, 3:05pm | Darren Kennedy Oval | TBA |
| Terrigal Sharks | 20 – 6 | Berkeley Vale Panthers | Sunday, 1 June, 3:05pm | Duffys Road Oval | TBA |
| Kincumber Colts | 22 – 26 | Woy Woy Roosters | Sunday, 1 June, 3:05pm | MacKillop Oval | TBA |
| The Entrance Tigers (R) | | BYE |
Round 4
| Erina Eagles | 52 – 6 | Berkeley Vale Panthers | Sunday, 4 May, 3:05pm | Erina Oval | TBA |
| Wyong Roos (R) | 22 – 16 | Ourimbah-Wyoming Magpies | Sunday, 4 May, 3:05pm | Morry Breen Oval | TBA |
| Woy Woy Roosters | 10 – 18 | Toukley Hawks | Sunday, 4 May, 3:05pm | Woy Woy Oval | TBA |
| The Entrance Tigers (R) | 0 – 18 | Kincumber Colts | Wednesday, 20 August, 7:30pm | Bill Hicks Oval | TBA |
| Terrigal Sharks | | BYE |
Round 5
| Berkeley Vale Panthers | 32 – 22 | Ourimbah-Wyoming Magpies | Sunday, 11 May, 3:05pm | Ted Doyle Oval | TBA |
| Terrigal Sharks | 0 – 34 | Toukley Hawks | Sunday, 11 May, 3:05pm | Duffys Road Oval | TBA |
| The Entrance Tigers (R) | 4 – 18 | Wyong Roos (R) | Sunday, 11 May, 3:05pm | EDSACC Oval | TBA |
| Kincumber Colts | 12 – 18 | Erina Eagles | Sunday, 11 May, 3:05pm | MacKillop Oval | TBA |
| Woy Woy Roosters | | BYE |
Round 6
| Berkeley Vale Panthers | 0 – 36 | The Entrance Tigers (R) | Sunday, 27 July, 3:05pm | Ted Doyle Oval | TBA |
| Ourimbah-Wyoming Magpies | 28 – 40 | Woy Woy Roosters | Sunday, 27 July, 3:05pm | Bill Sohier Park | TBA |
| Toukley Hawks | 26 – 20 | Kincumber Colts | Sunday, 27 July, 3:05pm | Darren Kennedy Oval | TBA |
| Erina Eagles | 66 – 6 | Terrigal Sharks | Sunday, 27 July, 3:05pm | Erina Oval | TBA |
| Wyong Roos (R) | | BYE |
Round 7
| Ourimbah-Wyoming Magpies | 0 – 52 | Toukley Hawks | Sunday, 31 August, 3:05pm | Bill Sohier Park | TBA |
| The Entrance Tigers (R) | 22 – 34 | Erina Eagles | Sunday, 31 August, 3:05pm | EDSACC Oval | TBA |
| Wyong Roos (R) | 66 – 6 | Terrigal Sharks | Sunday, 31 August, 3:05pm | Morry Breen Oval | TBA |
| Woy Woy Roosters | 64 – 12 | Berkeley Vale Panthers | Sunday, 31 August, 3:05pm | Woy Woy Oval | TBA |
| Kincumber Colts | | BYE |
Round 8
| Berkeley Vale Panthers | 12 – 46 | Kincumber Colts | Sunday, 8 June, 3:05pm | Ted Doyle Oval | TBA |
| Terrigal Sharks | 22 – 42 | Ourimbah-Wyoming Magpies | Sunday, 8 June, 3:05pm | Duffys Road Oval | TBA |
| Erina Eagles | 20 – 12 | Wyong Roos (R) | Sunday, 8 June, 3:05pm | Erina Oval | TBA |
| Woy Woy Roosters | 12 – 28 | The Entrance Tigers (R) | Sunday, 8 June, 3:05pm | Woy Woy Oval | TBA |
| Toukley Hawks | | BYE |
Round 9
| Toukley Hawks | 12 – 2 | The Entrance Tigers (R) | Sunday, 15 June, 3:05pm | Darren Kennedy Oval | TBA |
| Terrigal Sharks | 12 – 40 | Woy Woy Roosters | Sunday, 15 June, 3:05pm | Duffys Road Oval | TBA |
| Kincumber Colts | 24 – 20 | Ourimbah-Wyoming Magpies | Sunday, 15 June, 3:05pm | MacKillop Oval | TBA |
| Wyong Roos (R) | 48 – 4 | Berkeley Vale Panthers | Sunday, 15 June, 3:05pm | Morry Breen Oval | TBA |
| Erina Eagles | | BYE |
Round 10
| Ourimbah-Wyoming Magpies | 26 – 4 | Wyong Roos (R) | Sunday, 22 June, 3:05pm | Bill Sohier Park | TBA |
| Toukley Hawks | 26 – 4 | Woy Woy Roosters | Sunday, 22 June, 3:05pm | Darren Kennedy Oval | TBA |
| The Entrance Tigers (R) | 40 – 22 | Berkeley Vale Panthers | Sunday, 22 June, 3:05pm | EDSACC Oval | TBA |
| Erina Eagles | 16 – 16 | Kincumber Colts | Sunday, 22 June, 3:05pm | Erina Oval | TBA |
| Terrigal Sharks | | BYE |
Round 11
| Berkeley Vale Panthers | 12 – 18 | Terrigal Sharks | Sunday, 29 June, 3:05pm | Ted Doyle Oval | TBA |
| Erina Eagles | 18 – 4 | Toukley Hawks | Sunday, 29 June, 3:05pm | Erina Oval | TBA |
| Wyong Roos (R) | 22 – 18 | The Entrance Tigers (R) | Sunday, 29 June, 3:05pm | Morry Breen Oval | TBA |
| Woy Woy Roosters | 40 – 22 | Ourimbah-Wyoming Magpies | Sunday, 29 June, 3:05pm | Woy Woy Oval | TBA |
| Kincumber Colts | | BYE |
Round 12
| Toukley Hawks | 28 – 6 | Berkeley Vale Panthers | Sunday, 6 July, 3:05pm | Darren Kennedy Oval | TBA |
| Terrigal Sharks | 10 – 36 | Kincumber Colts | Sunday, 6 July, 3:05pm | Duffys Road Oval | TBA |
| The Entrance Tigers (R) | 42 – 16 | Ourimbah-Wyoming Magpies | Sunday, 6 July, 3:05pm | EDSACC Oval | TBA |
| Woy Woy Roosters | 12 – 22 | Erina Eagles | Sunday, 6 July, 3:05pm | Woy Woy Oval | TBA |
| Wyong Roos (R) | | BYE |
Round 13
| Wyong Roos (R) | 16 – 28 | Erina Eagles | Friday, 11 July, 7:30pm | Morry Breen Oval | TBA |
| Berkeley Vale Panthers | 22 – 42 | Woy Woy Roosters | Sunday, 13 July, 3:05pm | Ted Doyle Oval | TBA |
| Ourimbah-Wyoming Magpies | 28 – 14 | Terrigal Sharks | Sunday, 13 July, 3:05pm | Bill Sohier Park | TBA |
| Kincumber Colts | 24 – 14 | Toukley Hawks | Sunday, 13 July, 3:05pm | MacKillop Oval | TBA |
| The Entrance Tigers (R) | | BYE |
Round 14
| Erina Eagles | 6 – 12 | The Entrance Tigers (R) | Sunday, 20 July, 3:05pm | Erina Oval | TBA |
| Kincumber Colts | 30 – 10 | Berkeley Vale Panthers | Sunday, 20 July, 3:05pm | MacKillop Oval | TBA |
| Wyong Roos (R) | 0 – 28 | Toukley Hawks | Sunday, 20 July, 3:05pm | Morry Breen Oval | TBA |
| Woy Woy Roosters | 36 – 18 | Terrigal Sharks | Sunday, 20 July, 3:05pm | Woy Woy Oval | TBA |
| Ourimbah-Wyoming Magpies | | BYE |
Round 15
| Toukley Hawks | V | Ourimbah-Wyoming Magpies | Washout |
| Terrigal Sharks | V | Erina Eagles | Washout |
| The Entrance Tigers (R) | V | Woy Woy Roosters | Washout |
| Kincumber Colts | V | Wyong Roos (R) | Washout |
| Berkeley Vale Panthers | | BYE |
Round 16
| Berkeley Vale Panthers | V | Erina Eagles | Washout |
| Ourimbah-Wyoming Magpies | V | Kincumber Colts | Washout |
| Terrigal Sharks | V | The Entrance Tigers (R) | Washout |
| Wyong Roos (R) | V | Woy Woy Roosters | Washout |
| Toukley Hawks | | BYE |
Round 17
| Berkeley Vale Panthers | 6 – 38 | Wyong Roos (R) | Sunday, 17 August, 3:05pm | Ted Doyle Oval | TBA |
| Toukley Hawks | 58 – 0 | Terrigal Sharks | Sunday, 17 August, 3:05pm | Darren Kennedy Oval | TBA |
| Erina Eagles | 34 – 14 | Ourimbah-Wyoming Magpies | Sunday, 17 August, 3:05pm | Erina Oval | TBA |
| Kincumber Colts | 20 – 24 | The Entrance Tigers (R) | Sunday, 17 August, 3:05pm | MacKillop Oval | TBA |
| Woy Woy Roosters | | BYE |
Round 18
| Ourimbah-Wyoming Magpies | 27 – 20 | Berkeley Vale Panthers | Sunday, 24 August, 3:05pm | Bill Sohier Park | TBA |
| Terrigal Sharks | 0 – 58 | Wyong Roos (R) | Sunday, 24 August, 3:05pm | Duffys Road Oval | TBA |
| The Entrance Tigers (R) | 18 – 20 | Toukley Hawks | Sunday, 24 August, 3:05pm | EDSACC Oval | TBA |
| Woy Woy Roosters | 22 – 42 | Kincumber Colts | Sunday, 24 August, 3:05pm | Woy Woy Oval | TBA |
| Erina Eagles | | BYE |
Finals Series
Major & Minor Semi-Finals
| Erina Eagles | 4 – 8 | Toukley Hawks | Saturday, 6 September, 3:05pm | Woy Woy Oval | TBA |
| Kincumber Colts | 22 – 18 | Wyong Roos (R) | Sunday, 7 September, 3:05pm | Darren Kennedy Oval | TBA |
Preliminary Final
| Erina Eagles | 6 – 18 | Kincumber Colts | Sunday, 14 September, 3:05pm | Woy Woy Oval | TBA |
Grand Final
| Toukley Hawks | V | Kincumber Colts | Saturday, 20 September, 4:30pm | Morry Breen Oval | TBA |

==== Grand Final ====
Semi-Finals
1 | Erina | 4
2 | Toukley | 8
3 | Kincumber | 22
4 | Wyong | 18

Preliminary Final
1 | Erina | 6
3 | Kincumber | 18

Grand Final
2 | Toukley
3 | Kincumber

2025 Central Coast Premiership Grand Final

Saturday, 20 September 2025
4:30pm

| Toukley Hawks | v | Kincumber Colts |

Morry Breen Oval, Wyong

== Greater Western & Bidgee Region ==
=== Canberra Raiders Cup ===
The Canberra Premiership (named the Blumers Lawyers Canberra Raiders Cup for sponsorship reasons) is a Canberra based men's first grade rugby league competition that features teams from the Canberra district. This competition feeds into the Canberra Raiders New South Wales Cup team.

==== Teams ====
The lineup for 2025 will be the same as 2024.

| Colours | Club | NSW Cup Affiliate | Home ground(s) | Head coach |
|---|---|---|---|---|
| | Belconnen United Sharks | Canberra Raiders | NSWRL HQ Bruce | TBA |
| | Goulburn City Bulldogs | Canberra Raiders | Workers Arena | TBA |
| | Gungahlin Bulls | Canberra Raiders | Gungahlin Enclosed Oval | TBA |
| | Queanbeyan Kangaroos | Canberra Raiders | Seears Workwear Oval | TBA |
| | Queanbeyan United Blues | Canberra Raiders | Seiffert Oval | TBA |
| | Tuggeranong Valley Bushrangers | Canberra Raiders | Greenway Oval | TBA |
| | West Belconnen Warriors | Canberra Raiders | Raiders Belconnen | TBA |
| | Woden Valley Rams | Canberra Raiders | Phillip Oval | TBA |
| | Yass United Magpies | Canberra Raiders | Walker Park | TBA |

| State Map | Canberra Map |
|---|---|
| Home Venues | Home Venues |

==== Ladder ====
| Pos | Team | Pld | W | D | L | B | PF | PA | PD | Pts | Qualification |
|---|---|---|---|---|---|---|---|---|---|---|---|
| 1 | Queanbeyan Kangaroos | 16 | 13 | 0 | 3 | 2 | 588 | 266 | +324 | 30 | Minor Premiers & Major Semi-Final |
| 2 | Queanbeyan United Blues | 16 | 11 | 0 | 5 | 2 | 494 | 298 | +196 | 26 | Major Semi-Final |
| 3 | West Belconnen Warriors | 16 | 9 | 2 | 5 | 2 | 388 | 294 | +66 | 24 | Minor Semi-Final |
| 4 | Tuggeranong Valley Bushrangers | 16 | 10 | 0 | 6 | 2 | 438 | 404 | +38 | 24 | Minor Semi-Final |
| 5 | Woden Valley Rams | 16 | 8 | 3 | 5 | 2 | 408 | 338 | +70 | 23 | |
| 6 | Gungahlin Bulls | 16 | 5 | 1 | 10 | 2 | 384 | 452 | –68 | 15 | |
| 7 | Belconnen United Sharks | 16 | 5 | 1 | 10 | 2 | 322 | 500 | -178 | 15 | |
| 8 | Goulburn City Bulldogs | 16 | 4 | 1 | 11 | 2 | 282 | 403 | -121 | 13 | |
| 9 | Yass United Magpies | 16 | 3 | 0 | 13 | 2 | 263 | 614 | -351 | 10 | |

Updated to match(es) played on 1 September. Source:
Rules for classification: 1) points; 2) point difference; 3) points scored

==== Ladder progression ====
- Numbers highlighted in green indicate that the team finished the round inside the top 4.
- Numbers highlighted in blue indicates the team finished first on the ladder in that round.
- Numbers highlighted in red indicates the team finished last place on the ladder in that round.
- Underlined numbers indicate that the team had a bye during that round.

| Pos | Team | 1 | 2 | 3 | 4 | 5 | 6 | 8 | 9 | 10 | 11 | 12 | 13 | 14 | 15 | 16 | 17 | 18 | 7 |
|---|---|---|---|---|---|---|---|---|---|---|---|---|---|---|---|---|---|---|---|
| 1 | Queanbeyan Kangaroos | 0 | 2 | 4 | 6 | 8 | 10 | 12 | 14 | 14 | 16 | 18 | 20 | 22 | 22 | 24 | 26 | 28 | 30 |
| 2 | Queanbeyan United Blues | 2 | 4 | 6 | 6 | 8 | 10 | 10 | 12 | 14 | 16 | 18 | 20 | 22 | 22 | 22 | 22 | 24 | 26 |
| 3 | West Belconnen Warriors | 1 | 3 | 5 | 7 | 9 | 11 | 11 | 13 | 13 | 15 | 17 | 17 | 17 | 19* | 21 | 21 | 23 | 24 |
| 4 | Tuggeranong Valley Bushrangers | 0 | 0 | 0 | 0 | 0 | 0 | 2 | 4 | 6 | 8 | 10 | 12 | 14 | 16 | 18 | 20 | 22 | 24 |
| 5 | Woden Valley Rams | 1 | 3 | 5 | 5 | 7 | 7 | 9 | 10 | 12 | 13 | 13 | 13 | 15 | 15* | 17 | 19 | 21 | 23 |
| 6 | Gungahlin Bulls | 2 | 2 | 2 | 4 | 4 | 6 | 8 | 8 | 8 | 8 | 10 | 12 | 12 | 12 | 12 | 14 | 14 | 15 |
| 7 | Belconnen United Sharks | 2 | 4 | 6 | 8 | 8 | 8 | 8 | 8 | 10 | 11 | 11 | 11 | 11 | 13 | 13 | 15 | 15 | 15 |
| 8 | Goulburn City Bulldogs | 2 | 2 | 2 | 4 | 6 | 6 | 6 | 7 | 7 | 7 | 7 | 9 | 11 | 13 | 13 | 13 | 13 | 13 |
| 9 | Yass United Magpies | 0 | 0 | 0 | 0 | 0 | 2 | 4 | 4 | 6 | 6 | 6 | 6 | 6 | 8 | 10 | 10 | 10 | 10 |

- Prior to Round 15, Woden Valley were stripped 2 points due to a salary cap breach. Those 2 points were awarded to West Belconnen.

Season Results:

| Home | Score | Away | Match Information |
| Home | Score | Away | Date and Time | Venue | Referee | Video |
|---|---|---|---|---|---|---|
Round 1
| Gungahlin Bulls | 40 – 16 | Tuggeranong Valley Bushrangers | Saturday, 5 April, 3:00pm | Gungahlin Enclosed Oval | TBA |
| Woden Valley Rams | 16 – 16 | West Belconnen Warriors | Saturday, 5 April, 3:00pm | Boomanulla Oval | TBA |
| Queanbeyan United Blues | 28 – 22 | Queanbeyan Kangaroos | Saturday, 5 April, 3:00pm | Seiffert Oval | TBA |
| Goulburn City Bulldogs | 32 – 18 | Yass United Magpies | Saturday, 5 April, 3:00pm | Workers Arena | TBA |
| Belconnen United Sharks | | BYE |
Round 2
| Tuggeranong Valley Bushrangers | 16 – 50 | Queanbeyan Kangaroos | Saturday, 12 April, 3:00pm | Greenway Oval | TBA |
| Belconnen United Sharks | 34 – 24 | Gungahlin Bulls | Saturday, 12 April, 3:00pm | NSWRL HQ Bruce | TBA |
| West Belconnen Warriors | 44 – 6 | Yass United Magpies | Saturday, 12 April, 3:00pm | Raiders Belconnen | TBA |
| Queanbeyan United Blues | 32 – 18 | Goulburn City Bulldogs | Saturday, 12 April, 3:00pm | Seiffert Oval | TBA |
| Woden Valley Rams | | BYE |
Round 3 (ANZAC Round)
| Queanbeyan United Blues | 38 – 10 | Gungahlin Bulls | Saturday, 26 April, 3:00pm | Seiffert Oval | TBA |
| Yass United Magpies | 24 – 40 | Woden Valley Rams | Saturday, 26 April, 3:00pm | Walker Park | TBA |
| Goulburn City Bulldogs | 24 – 32 | Belconnen United Sharks | Saturday, 26 April, 3:00pm | Workers Arena | TBA |
| West Belconnen Warriors | 16 – 12 | Tuggeranong Valley Bushrangers | Sunday, 27 April, 3:00pm | Raiders Belconnen | TBA |
| Queanbeyan Kangaroos | | BYE |
Round 4
| Tuggeranong Valley Bushrangers | 28 – 30 | Belconnen United Sharks | Saturday, 3 May, 3:00pm | Greenway Oval | Oliver Levido |
| Queanbeyan Kangaroos | 44 – 12 | Woden Valley Rams | Saturday, 3 May, 3:00pm | Seears Workwear Oval | Aidan Richardson |
| Queanbeyan United Blues | 10 – 24 | West Belconnen Warriors | Saturday, 3 May, 3:00pm | Seiffert Oval | Jason McManus |
| Yass United Magpies | 36 – 46 | Gungahlin Bulls | Saturday, 3 May, 3:00pm | Walker Park | James Charman |
| Goulburn City Bulldogs | | BYE |
Round 5
| Gungahlin Bulls | 18 – 30 | Goulburn City Bulldogs | Saturday, 10 May, 3:00pm | Gungahlin Enclosed Oval | Aidan Richardson |
| Belconnen United Sharks | 20 – 22 | Queanbeyan United Blues | Saturday, 10 May, 3:00pm | NSWRL HQ Bruce | Luke Barrow |
| Woden Valley Rams | 36 – 16 | Tuggeranong Valley Bushrangers | Saturday, 10 May, 3:00pm | Boomanulla Oval | Oliver Levido |
| Queanbeyan Kangaroos | 60 – 8 | Yass United Magpies | Saturday, 10 May, 3:00pm | Seears Workwear Oval | Jason McManus |
| West Belconnen Warriors | | BYE |
Round 6
| Tuggeranong Valley Bushrangers | 22 – 38 | Queanbeyan United Blues | Saturday, 17 May, 3:00pm | Greenway Oval | Aidan Richardson |
| Gungahlin Bulls | 28 – 24 | Woden Valley Rams | Saturday, 17 May, 3:00pm | Gungahlin Enclosed Oval | Jason McManus |
| West Belconnen Warriors | 38 – 4 | Goulburn City Bulldogs | Saturday, 17 May, 3:00pm | Raiders Belconnen | Andrew Nightingale |
| Queanbeyan Kangaroos | 50 – 16 | Belconnen United Sharks | Saturday, 17 May, 3:00pm | Seears Workwear Oval | Oliver Levido |
| Yass United Magpies | | BYE |
Round 7
| Tuggeranong Valley Bushrangers | 62 – 12 | Yass United Magpies | Saturday, 23 August, 3:00pm | Greenway Oval | Oliver Levido |
| Belconnen United Sharks | 14 – 46 | Woden Valley Rams | Saturday, 23 August, 3:00pm | NSWRL HQ Bruce | Andrew Nightingale |
| West Belconnen Warriors | 20 – 20 | Gungahlin Bulls | Saturday, 23 August, 3:00pm | Raiders Belconnen | Jason McManus |
| Goulburn City Bulldogs | 16 – 22 | Queanbeyan Kangaroos | Saturday, 23 August, 3:00pm | Workers Arena | Aidan Richardson |
| Queanbeyan United Blues | | BYE |
Round 8
| Woden Valley Rams | 14 – 10 | Queanbeyan United Blues | Saturday, 31 May, 3:00pm | Phillip Oval | Oliver Levido |
| Yass United Magpies | 28 – 18 | Belconnen United Sharks | Saturday, 31 May, 3:00pm | Walker Park | Andrew Nightingale |
| Goulburn City Bulldogs | 4 – 32 | Tuggeranong Valley Bushrangers | Saturday, 31 May, 3:00pm | Workers Arena | David Charman |
| West Belconnen Warriors | 0 – 16 | Queanbeyan Kangaroos | Sunday, 1 June, 3:00pm | Raiders Belconnen | Jason McManus |
| Gungahlin Bulls | | BYE |
Round 9
| Belconnen United Sharks | 20 – 46 | West Belconnen Warriors | Saturday, 14 June, 3:00pm | NSWRL HQ Bruce | Oliver Levido |
| Queanbeyan Kangaroos | 30 – 20 | Gungahlin Bulls | Saturday, 14 June, 3:00pm | Seears Workwear Oval | Luke Barrow |
| Queanbeyan United Blues | 58 – 6 | Yass United Magpies | Saturday, 14 June, 3:00pm | Seiffert Oval | Alexander Pruscino |
| Goulburn City Bulldogs | 18 – 18 | Woden Valley Rams | Saturday, 14 June, 3:00pm | Workers Arena | Jason McManus |
| Tuggeranong Valley Bushrangers | | BYE |
Round 10
| Tuggeranong Valley Bushrangers | 36 – 34 | Gungahlin Bulls | Saturday, 21 June, 3:00pm | Greenway Oval | Aidan Richardson |
| Queanbeyan Kangaroos | 20 – 48 | Queanbeyan United Blues | Saturday, 21 June, 3:00pm | Seears Workwear Oval | Jason McManus |
| Yass United Magpies | 27 – 26 | Goulburn City Bulldogs | Saturday, 21 June, 3:00pm | Walker Park | Oliver Levido |
| West Belconnen Warriors | 18* – 24 | Woden Valley Rams | Saturday, 21 June, 3:00pm | Raiders Belconnen | Andrew Nightingale |
| Belconnen United Sharks | | BYE |
Round 11
| Gungahlin Bulls | 14 – 24 | West Belconnen Warriors | Saturday, 28 June, 3:00pm | Gungahlin Enclosed Oval | TBA |
| Woden Valley Rams | 20 – 20 | Belconnen United Sharks | Saturday, 28 June, 3:00pm | Phillip Oval | TBA |
| Queanbeyan Kangaroos | 40 – 16 | Goulburn City Bulldogs | Saturday, 28 June, 3:00pm | Seears Workwear Oval | TBA |
| Yass United Magpies | 16 – 24 | Tuggeranong Valley Bushrangers | Saturday, 28 June, 3:00pm | Walker Park | TBA |
| Queanbeyan United Blues | | BYE |
Round 12
| Tuggeranong Valley Bushrangers | 30 – 26 | Woden Valley Rams | Saturday, 5 July, 3:00pm | Greenway Oval | Luke Barrow |
| Queanbeyan United Blues | 46 – 4 | Belconnen United Sharks | Saturday, 5 July, 3:00pm | Seiffert Oval | Jason McManus |
| Yass United Magpies | 4 – 56 | Queanbeyan Kangaroos | Saturday, 5 July, 3:00pm | Walker Park | James Charman |
| Goulburn City Bulldogs | 10 – 22 | Gungahlin Bulls | Saturday, 5 July, 3:00pm | Workers Arena | Aidan Richardson |
| West Belconnen Warriors | | BYE |
Round 13
| Gungahlin Bulls | 36 – 18 | Yass United Magpies | Saturday, 12 July, 3:00pm | Gungahlin Enclosed Oval | Jack Black |
| Belconnen United Sharks | 28 – 30 | Tuggeranong Valley Bushrangers | Saturday, 12 July, 3:00pm | NSWRL HQ Bruce | Jason McManus |
| Woden Valley Rams | 8 – 58 | Queanbeyan Kangaroos | Saturday, 12 July, 3:00pm | Phillip Oval | Oliver Levido |
| West Belconnen Warriors | 22 – 34 | Queanbeyan United Blues | Sunday, 13 July, 3:00pm | Raiders Belconnen | Jason McManus |
| Goulburn City Bulldogs | | BYE |
Round 14
| Tuggeranong Valley Bushrangers | 26 – 12 | West Belconnen Warriors | Saturday, 19 July, 3:00pm | Greenway Oval | Jack Black |
| Gungahlin Bulls | 30 – 42 | Queanbeyan United Blues | Saturday, 19 July, 3:00pm | Gungahlin Enclosed Oval | Aidan Richardson |
| Belconnen United Sharks | 12 – 28 | Goulburn City Bulldogs | Saturday, 19 July, 3:00pm | NSWRL HQ Bruce | Jason McManus |
| Woden Valley Rams | 40 – 6 | Yass United Magpies | Saturday, 19 July, 3:00pm | Phillip Oval | Luke Barrow |
| Queanbeyan Kangaroos | | BYE |
Round 15
| Gungahlin Bulls | 6 – 16 | Belconnen United Sharks | Saturday, 26 July, 3:00pm | Gungahlin Enclosed Oval | TBA |
| Queanbeyan Kangaroos | 8 – 18 | Tuggeranong Valley Bushrangers | Saturday, 26 July, 3:00pm | Seears Workwear Oval | TBA |
| Yass United Magpies | 22 – 20 | West Belconnen Warriors | Saturday, 26 July, 3:00pm | Walker Park | TBA |
| Goulburn City Bulldogs | 14 – 12 | Queanbeyan United Blues | Saturday, 26 July, 3:00pm | Workers Arena | TBA |
| Woden Valley Rams | | BYE |
Round 16
| Belconnen United Sharks | 8 – 34 | Queanbeyan Kangaroos | Saturday, 2 August, 3:00pm | NSWRL HQ Bruce | TBA |
| Woden Valley Rams | 40 – 14 | Gungahlin Bulls | Saturday, 2 August, 3:00pm | Phillip Oval | TBA |
| Queanbeyan United Blues | 32 – 34 | Tuggeranong Valley Bushrangers | Saturday, 2 August, 3:00pm | Seiffert Oval | TBA |
| Goulburn City Bulldogs | 8 – 14 | West Belconnen Warriors | Saturday, 2 August, 3:00pm | Workers Arena | TBA |
| Yass United Magpies | | BYE |
Round 17
| Tuggeranong Valley Bushrangers | 36 – 22 | Goulburn City Bulldogs | Saturday, 9 August, 3:00pm | Greenway Oval | Aidan Richardson |
| Belconnen United Sharks | 28 – 18 | Yass United Magpies | Saturday, 9 August, 3:00pm | NSWRL HQ Bruce | Andrew Nightingale |
| Queanbeyan Kangaroos | 40 – 24 | West Belconnen Warriors | Saturday, 9 August, 3:00pm | Seears Workwear Oval | Jason McManus |
| Queanbeyan United Blues | 20 – 24 | Woden Valley Rams | Saturday, 9 August, 3:00pm | Seiffert Oval | Oliver Levido |
| Gungahlin Bulls | | BYE |
Round 18
| Gungahlin Bulls | 22 – 38 | Queanbeyan Kangaroos | Saturday, 16 August, 3:00pm | Gungahlin Enclosed Oval | Oliver Levido |
| Woden Valley Rams | 30 – 18 | Goulburn City Bulldogs | Saturday, 16 August, 3:00pm | Phillip Oval | Jason McManus |
| Yass United Magpies | 14 – 24 | Queanbeyan United Blues | Saturday, 16 August, 3:00pm | Walker Park | Jack Black |
| West Belconnen Warriors | 50 – 22 | Belconnen United Sharks | Sunday, 17 August, 3:00pm | Raiders Belconnen | Andrew Nightingale |
| Tuggeranong Valley Bushrangers | | BYE |
Finals Series
Major & Minor Semi-Finals
| Queanbeyan Kangaroos | 16 – 28 | Queanbeyan United Blues | Saturday, 30 August, 3:00pm | Seears Workwear Oval | TBA |
| West Belconnen Warriors | 24 – 30 | Tuggeranong Valley Bushrangers | Sunday, 31 August, 3:00pm | Raiders Belconnen | TBA |
Preliminary Final
| Queanbeyan Kangaroos | 46 – 24 | Tuggeranong Valley Bushrangers | Sunday, 7 September, 3:15pm | Gungahlin Enclosed Oval | Jason McManus |
Grand Final
| Queanbeyan United Blues | V | Queanbeyan Kangaroos | Saturday, 13 September, 3:30pm | Seiffert Oval | TBA |

==== Grand Final ====
Semi-Finals
1 | Queanbeyan | 16
2 | Queanbeyan United | 28
3 | West Belconnen | 24
4 | Tuggeranong Valley | 30

Preliminary Final
1 | Queanbeyan | 46
4 | Tuggeranong Valley | 24

Grand Final
2 | Queanbeyan United
1 | Queanbeyan

2025 Canberra Raiders Cup Grand Final

Saturday, 13 September 2025
3:30pm

| Queanbeyan United Blues | v | Queanbeyan Kangaroos |

Seiffert Oval, Queanbeyan

=== Group 9 Premiership ===
The Group 9 Premiership (named the Great Northern First Grade Premiership for sponsorship reasons) is a Riverina based men's first grade rugby league competition that features teams from the Southern Riverina district. This competition feeds into the Canberra Raiders New South Wales Cup team.

==== Teams ====
There is one change to the 2025 lineup with the Cootamunda Bulldogs returning to the competition for the first time since 2019.

| Colours | Club | NSW Cup Affiliate | Home ground(s) | Head coach |
|---|---|---|---|---|
| | Albury Thunder | Canberra Raiders | Greenfield Park | TBA |
| | Cootamundra Bulldogs | Canberra Raiders | Les Boyd Oval | TBA |
| | Gundagai Tigers | Canberra Raiders | ANZAC Park | TBA |
| | Junee Diesels | Canberra Raiders | Laurie Daley Oval | TBA |
| | South City Bulls | Canberra Raiders | Harris Park | TBA |
| | Temora Dragons | Canberra Raiders | Nixon Park | TBA |
| | Tumut Blues | Canberra Raiders | Twickenham Oval | TBA |
| | Wagga Wagga Brothers | Canberra Raiders | GeoHex Stadium | TBA |
| | Wagga Wagga Kangaroos | Canberra Raiders | GeoHex Stadium | TBA |
| | Young Cherrypickers | Canberra Raiders | Alfred Oval | TBA |

| State Map | Wagga Wagga Map |
|---|---|
| Home Venues | Home Venues |

==== Ladder ====
| Pos | Team | Pld | W | D | L | B | PF | PA | PD | Pts | Qualification |
|---|---|---|---|---|---|---|---|---|---|---|---|
| 1 | Wagga Wagga Kangaroos | 16 | 15 | 0 | 1 | 0 | 572 | 166 | +406 | 30 | Minor Premiers & Major Semi-Final |
| 2 | Gundagai Tigers | 16 | 12 | 0 | 4 | 0 | 434 | 262 | +172 | 24 | Qualifying Final |
| 3 | Young Cherrypickers | 16 | 11 | 0 | 5 | 0 | 527 | 296 | +231 | 22 | Qualifying Final |
| 4 | Temora Dragons | 16 | 10 | 1 | 5 | 0 | 434 | 260 | +174 | 21 | Elimination Final |
| 5 | Tumut Blues | 16 | 9 | 1 | 6 | 0 | 356 | 330 | +26 | 19 | Elimination Final |
| 6 | Albury Thunder | 16 | 7 | 2 | 7 | 0 | 494 | 383 | +111 | 16 | |
| 7 | Junee Diesels | 16 | 6 | 0 | 10 | 0 | 376 | 413 | –37 | 12 | |
| 8 | South City Bulls | 16 | 5 | 0 | 11 | 0 | 337 | 394 | –57 | 10 | |
| 9 | Cootamundra Bulldogs | 16 | 3 | 0 | 13 | 0 | 242 | 462 | -220 | 6 | |
| 10 | Wagga Wagga Brothers | 16 | 0 | 0 | 16 | 0 | 116 | 922 | -806 | 0 | |

Updated to match(es) played on 1 September. Source:
Rules for classification: 1) points; 2) point difference; 3) points scored

==== Ladder progression ====
- Numbers highlighted in green indicate that the team finished the round inside the top 5.
- Numbers highlighted in blue indicates the team finished first on the ladder in that round.
- Numbers highlighted in red indicates the team finished last place on the ladder in that round.
- Underlined numbers indicate that the team had a bye during that round.

| Pos | Team | 1 | 2 | 3 | 4 | 5 | 6 | 7 | 8 | 9 | 10 | 11 | 12 | 13 | 14 | 15 | 16 |
|---|---|---|---|---|---|---|---|---|---|---|---|---|---|---|---|---|---|
| 1 | Wagga Wagga Kangaroos | 2 | 4 | 6 | 8 | 10 | 12 | 14 | 16 | 18 | 20 | 20 | 22 | 24 | 26 | 28 | 30 |
| 2 | Gundagai Tigers | 2 | 2 | 2 | 4 | 6 | 8 | 10 | 12 | 14 | 14 | 16 | 18 | 18 | 20 | 22 | 24 |
| 3 | Young Cherrypickers | 2 | 4 | 6 | 6 | 8 | 8 | 8 | 8 | 8 | 10 | 12 | 14 | 16 | 18 | 20 | 22 |
| 4 | Temora Dragons | 0 | 2 | 4 | 6 | 6 | 8 | 10 | 11 | 13 | 15 | 17 | 17 | 19 | 19 | 21 | 21 |
| 5 | Tumut Blues | 1 | 3 | 5 | 7 | 9 | 9 | 9 | 11 | 13 | 13 | 15 | 15 | 17 | 19 | 19 | 19 |
| 6 | Albury Thunder | 1 | 1 | 3 | 5 | 5 | 5 | 7 | 8 | 8 | 10 | 10 | 12 | 14 | 14 | 16 | 16 |
| 7 | Junee Diesels | 0 | 2 | 2 | 2 | 2 | 4 | 4 | 6 | 6 | 6 | 8 | 10 | 10 | 10 | 10 | 12 |
| 8 | South City Bulls | 2 | 2 | 2 | 2 | 2 | 4 | 4 | 4 | 6 | 8 | 8 | 8 | 8 | 8 | 8 | 10 |
| 9 | Cootamundra Bulldogs | 0 | 0 | 0 | 0 | 2 | 2 | 4 | 4 | 4 | 4 | 4 | 4 | 4 | 6 | 6 | 6 |
| 10 | Wagga Wagga Brothers | 0 | 0 | 0 | 0 | 0 | 0 | 0 | 0 | 0 | 0 | 0 | 0 | 0 | 0 | 0 | 0 |

Season Results:

| Home | Score | Away | Match Information |
| Home | Score | Away | Date and Time | Venue | Referee | Video |
|---|---|---|---|---|---|---|
Round 1
| Wagga Wagga Brothers | 6 – 54 | Young Cherrypickers | Saturday, 12 April, 2:35pm | GeoHex Stadium | TBA |
| Gundagai Tigers | 26 – 14 | Temora Dragons | Saturday, 12 April, 2:35pm | ANZAC Park | TBA |
| Tumut Blues | 18 – 18 | Albury Thunder | Saturday, 12 April, 2:35pm | Twickenham Oval | TBA |
| Cootamundra Bulldogs | 4 – 34 | Wagga Wagga Kangaroos | Sunday, 13 April, 2:35pm | Les Boyd Oval | TBA |
| South City Bulls | 28 – 24 | Junee Diesels | Sunday, 13 April, 2:35pm | Harris Park | TBA |
Round 2 (ANZAC Round)
| Temora Dragons | 22 – 20 | South City Bulls | Saturday, 26 April, 2:35pm | Nixon Park | Dwayne Ryan |
| Young Cherrypickers | 44 – 10 | Albury Thunder | Saturday, 26 April, 2:35pm | Alfred Oval | Housh Fallah |
| Junee Diesels | 50 – 10 | Wagga Wagga Brothers | Sunday, 27 April, 2:35pm | Laurie Daley Oval | Wilson Hooper |
| Cootamundra Bulldogs | 16 – 22 | Tumut Blues | Sunday, 27 April, 2:35pm | Les Boyd Oval | Scott Muir |
| Gundagai Tigers | 18 – 22 | Wagga Wagga Kangaroos | Sunday, 27 April, 2:35pm | ANZAC Park | Isaac Cornell |
Round 3 (Rivalry Round)
| Wagga Wagga Kangaroos | 36 – 12 | South City Bulls | Saturday, 3 May, 2:35pm | GeoHex Stadium | Scott Muir |
| Tumut Blues | 24 – 18 | Gundagai Tigers | Saturday, 3 May, 2:35pm | Twickenham Oval | Dwayne Ryan |
| Albury Thunder | 60 – 6 | Wagga Wagga Brothers | Saturday, 3 May, 2:35pm | Greenfield Park | Wilson Hooper |
| Junee Diesels | 0 – 40 | Temora Dragons | Sunday, 4 May, 2:35pm | Laurie Daley Oval | Isaac Cornell |
| Young Cherrypickers | 40 – 6 | Cootamundra Bulldogs | Sunday, 4 May, 2:35pm | Alfred Oval | Housh Fallah |
Round 4
| Cootamundra Bulldogs | 14 – 52 | Albury Thunder | Saturday, 10 May, 2:35pm | Les Boyd Oval | TBA |
| Wagga Wagga Kangaroos | 58 – 0 | Junee Diesels | Saturday, 10 May, 2:35pm | GeoHex Stadium | TBA |
| South City Bulls | 26 – 28 | Tumut Blues | Sunday, 11 May, 2:35pm | Harris Park | TBA |
| Temora Dragons | 88 – 6 | Wagga Wagga Brothers | Sunday, 11 May, 2:35pm | Nixon Park | TBA |
| Gundagai Tigers | 30 – 22 | Young Cherrypickers | Sunday, 11 May, 2:35pm | ANZAC Park | TBA |
Round 5
| Temora Dragons | 16 – 22 | Wagga Wagga Kangaroos | Saturday, 17 May, 2:35pm | Nixon Park | TBA |
| Tumut Blues | 32 – 12 | Junee Diesels | Saturday, 17 May, 2:35pm | Twickenham Oval | TBA |
| Wagga Wagga Brothers | 12 – 34 | Cootamundra Bulldogs | Saturday, 17 May, 2:35pm | GeoHex Stadium | TBA |
| Albury Thunder | 16 – 24 | Gundagai Tigers | Sunday, 18 May, 2:35pm | Greenfield Park | TBA |
| Young Cherrypickers | 40 – 20 | South City Bulls | Sunday, 18 May, 2:35pm | Alfred Oval | TBA |
Round 6
| South City Bulls | 22 – 20 | Albury Thunder | Saturday, 24 May, 2:35pm | Harris Park | TBA |
| Junee Diesels | 30 – 28 | Young Cherrypickers | Saturday, 24 May, 2:35pm | Laurie Daley Oval | TBA |
| Gundagai Tigers | 20 – 12 | Cootamundra Bulldogs | Saturday, 24 May, 2:35pm | ANZAC Park | TBA |
| Wagga Wagga Kangaroos | 66 – 0 | Wagga Wagga Brothers | Sunday, 25 May, 2:35pm | GeoHex Stadium | TBA |
| Tumut Blues | 22 – 32 | Temora Dragons | Sunday, 25 May, 2:35pm | Twickenham Oval | TBA |
Round 7
| Tumut Blues | 0 – 50 | Wagga Wagga Kangaroos | Saturday, 31 May, 2:35pm | Twickenham Oval | TBA |
| Temora Dragons | 24 – 22 | Young Cherrypickers | Saturday, 31 May, 2:35pm | Nixon Park | TBA |
| Albury Thunder | 40 – 36 | Junee Diesels | Sunday, 1 June, 2:35pm | Greenfield Park | TBA |
| Cootamundra Bulldogs | 24 – 4 | South City Bulls | Sunday, 1 June, 2:35pm | Les Boyd Oval | TBA |
| Wagga Wagga Brothers | 10 – 56 | Gundagai Tigers | Sunday, 1 June, 2:35pm | GeoHex Stadium | TBA |
Round 8
| Junee Diesels | 26 – 24 | Cootamundra Bulldogs | Saturday, 14 June, 2:35pm | Laurie Daley Oval | TBA |
| Tumut Blues | 42 – 20 | Wagga Wagga Brothers | Saturday, 14 June, 2:35pm | Twickenham Oval | TBA |
| Temora Dragons | 22 – 22 | Albury Thunder | Sunday, 15 June, 2:35pm | Nixon Park | TBA |
| Wagga Wagga Kangaroos | 18 – 16 | Young Cherrypickers | Sunday, 15 June, 2:35pm | GeoHex Stadium | TBA |
| South City Bulls | 14 – 22 | Gundagai Tigers | Sunday, 15 June, 2:35pm | Harris Park | TBA |
Round 9
| Gundagai Tigers | 20 – 18 | Junee Diesels | Saturday, 21 June, 2:35pm | ANZAC Park | TBA |
| Albury Thunder | 12 – 34 | Wagga Wagga Kangaroos | Saturday, 21 June, 2:35pm | Greenfield Park | TBA |
| Young Cherrypickers | 18 – 22 | Tumut Blues | Sunday, 22 June, 2:35pm | Alfred Oval | TBA |
| Cootamundra Bulldogs | 4 – 42 | Temora Dragons | Sunday, 22 June, 2:35pm | Les Boyd Oval | TBA |
| Wagga Wagga Brothers | 4 – 52 | South City Bulls | Sunday, 22 June, 2:35pm | GeoHex Stadium | TBA |
Round 10
| Wagga Wagga Kangaroos | 56 – 6 | Cootamundra Bulldogs | Saturday, 28 June, 2:35pm | GeoHex Stadium | TBA |
| Albury Thunder | 44 – 26 | Tumut Blues | Saturday, 28 June, 2:35pm | Greenfield Park | TBA |
| Temora Dragons | 22 – 12 | Gundagai Tigers | Saturday, 28 June, 2:35pm | Nixon Park | TBA |
| Young Cherrypickers | 86 – 6 | Wagga Wagga Brothers | Sunday, 29 June, 2:35pm | Alfred Oval | TBA |
| Junee Diesels | 12 – 19 | South City Bulls | Sunday, 29 June, 2:35pm | Laurie Daley Oval | TBA |
Round 11
| Wagga Wagga Kangaroos | 10 – 22 | Gundagai Tigers | Saturday, 5 July, 2:35pm | GeoHex Stadium | TBA |
| Tumut Blues | 28 – 8 | Cootamundra Bulldogs | Saturday, 5 July, 2:35pm | Twickenham Oval | TBA |
| Wagga Wagga Brothers | 0 – 68 | Junee Diesels | Saturday, 5 July, 2:35pm | Harris Park | TBA |
| South City Bulls | 10 – 26 | Temora Dragons | Sunday, 6 July, 2:35pm | Harris Park | TBA |
| Albury Thunder | 22 – 23 | Young Cherrypickers | Sunday, 6 July, 2:35pm | Greenfield Park | TBA |
Round 12 (Rivalry Round)
| Gundagai Tigers | 14 – 10 | Tumut Blues | Saturday, 19 July, 2:35pm | ANZAC Park | TBA |
| Wagga Wagga Brothers | 10 – 66 | Albury Thunder | Saturday, 19 July, 2:35pm | GeoHex Stadium | TBA |
| Temora Dragons | 16 – 26 | Junee Diesels | Sunday, 20 July, 2:35pm | Nixon Park | TBA |
| Cootamundra Bulldogs | 22 – 28 | Young Cherrypickers | Sunday, 20 July, 2:35pm | Les Boyd Oval | TBA |
| South City Bulls | 16 – 34 | Wagga Wagga Kangaroos | Sunday, 20 July, 2:35pm | Harris Park | TBA |
Round 13
| Tumut Blues | 24 – 4 | South City Bulls | Saturday, 26 July, 2:35pm | Twickenham Oval | TBA |
| Junee Diesels | 8 – 18 | Wagga Wagga Kangaroos | Saturday, 26 July, 2:35pm | Laurie Daley Oval | TBA |
| Wagga Wagga Brothers | 10 – 22 | Temora Dragons | Saturday, 26 July, 2:35pm | GeoHex Stadium | TBA |
| Young Cherrypickers | 22 – 20 | Gundagai Tigers | Sunday, 27 July, 2:35pm | Alfred Oval | TBA |
| Albury Thunder | 28 – 6 | Cootamundra Bulldogs | Sunday, 27 July, 2:35pm | Greenfield Park | TBA |
Round 14
| Wagga Wagga Kangaroos | 24 – 18 | Temora Dragons | Saturday, 9 August, 2:35pm | GeoHex Stadium | TBA |
| Cootamundra Bulldogs | 44 – 4 | Wagga Wagga Brothers | Saturday, 9 August, 2:35pm | Les Boyd Oval | TBA |
| Gundagai Tigers | 32 – 22 | Albury Thunder | Saturday, 9 August, 2:35pm | ANZAC Park | TBA |
| South City Bulls | 24 – 26 | Young Cherrypickers | Sunday, 10 August, 2:35pm | Harris Park | TBA |
| Junee Diesels | 12 – 30 | Tumut Blues | Sunday, 10 August, 2:35pm | Laurie Daley Oval | TBA |
Round 15
| Temora Dragons | 12 – 10 | Tumut Blues | Saturday, 16 August, 2:35pm | Nixon Park | TBA |
| Wagga Wagga Brothers | 0 – 64 | Wagga Wagga Kangaroos | Saturday, 16 August, 2:35pm | GeoHex Stadium | TBA |
| Albury Thunder | 46 – 30 | South City Bulls | Sunday, 17 August, 2:35pm | Greenfield Park | TBA |
| Young Cherrypickers | 34 – 18 | Junee Diesels | Sunday, 17 August, 2:35pm | Alfred Oval | TBA |
| Cootamundra Bulldogs | 12 – 30 | Gundagai Tigers | Sunday, 17 August, 2:35pm | Les Boyd Oval | TBA |
Round 16
| Wagga Wagga Kangaroos | 26 – 18 | Tumut Blues | Saturday, 23 August, 2:35pm | GeoHex Stadium | TBA |
| Junee Diesels | 36 – 16 | Albury Thunder | Saturday, 23 August, 2:35pm | Laurie Daley Oval | TBA |
| Young Cherrypickers | 24 – 18 | Temora Dragons | Saturday, 23 August, 2:35pm | Alfred Oval | TBA |
| South City Bulls | 36 – 6 | Cootamundra Bulldogs | Sunday, 24 August, 2:35pm | Harris Park | TBA |
| Gundagai Tigers | 70 – 12 | Wagga Wagga Brothers | Sunday, 24 August, 2:35pm | ANZAC Park | TBA |
Finals Series
Qualifying & Elimination Finals
| Temora Dragons | 28 – 16 | Tumut Blues | Saturday, 30 August, 2:35pm | Nixon Park | TBA |
| Gundagai Tigers | 42 – 18 | Young Cherrypickers | Sunday, 31 August, 2:35pm | ANZAC Park | TBA |
Major & Minor Semi-Finals
| Young Cherrypickers | 28 – 14 | Temora Dragons | Saturday, 6 September, 2:35pm | Alfred Oval | TBA |
| Wagga Wagga Kangaroos | 34 – 16 | Gundagai Tigers | Sunday, 7 September, 2:35pm | GeoHex Stadium | TBA |
Preliminary Final
| Gundagai Tigers | 32 – 20 | Young Cherrypickers | Sunday, 14 September, 2:35pm | Twickenham Oval | TBA |
Grand Final
| Wagga Wagga Kangaroos | V | Gundagai Tigers | Sunday, 21 September, 2:35pm | GeoHex Stadium | TBA |

==== Grand Final ====
Qualifying & Elimination Finals
2 | Gundagai | 42
3 | Young | 18
4 | Temora | 28
5 | Tumut | 16

Major Semi-Final
1 | Wagga Wagga | 34
2 | Gundagai | 16
Minor Semi-Final
3 | Young | 28
4 | Temora | 14

Preliminary Final
2 | Gundagai | 32
3 | Young | 20

Grand Final
1 | Wagga Wagga
2 | Gundagai

2025 Group 9 Premiership Grand Final

Sunday, 21 September
2:35pm

| Wagga Wagga Kangaroos | v | Gundagai Tigers |

GeoHex Stadium, Wagga Wagga

=== Peter McDonald Premiership ===
The Peter McDonald Premiership is the Western Division men's first grade rugby league competition that features teams from the former Group 10 and Group 11 competitions. Formerly a president's cup competition, it dropped back into the premiership division for the 2024 season onwards.

==== Teams ====
| Colours | Club | NSW Cup Affiliate | Home ground(s) | Head coach |
|---|---|---|---|---|
| | Bathurst Panthers | Penrith Panthers | Carrington Park | Jake Betts |
| | Bathurst St Patricks Saints | Penrith Panthers | Jack Arrow Sporting Complex | Chris Osborne |
| | Dubbo CYMS Fishies | Penrith Panthers | Apex Oval | Shawn Townsend |
| | Dubbo Macquarie Raiders | Penrith Panthers | Apex Oval | Justin Carney |
| | Forbes Magpies | Penrith Panthers | Spooner Oval | Cameron Greenhalgh |
| | Lithgow Workies Wolves | Penrith Panthers | Tony Luchetti Sportsground | Peter Morris |
| | Mudgee Dragons | Penrith Panthers | Glen Willow Regional Sports Stadium | Clay Priest |
| | Nyngan Tigers | Penrith Panthers | Larkin Oval | James Tuitahi & Jacob Neill |
| | Orange CYMS | Penrith Panthers | Wade Park | Jack Buchanan |
| | Orange Hawks | Penrith Panthers | Wade Park | Shane Rodney |
| | Parkes Spacemen | Penrith Panthers | Pioneer Oval | Sam Dwyer |
| | Wellington Cowboys | Penrith Panthers | Kennard Park | Justin Toomey-White |

| State Map | Orange Map |
|---|---|
| Home Venues | Home Venues |

==== Ladder ====
| Pos | Team | Pld | W | D | L | B | PF | PA | PD | Pts | Qualification |
|---|---|---|---|---|---|---|---|---|---|---|---|
| 1 | Dubbo CYMS Fishies | 14 | 11 | 1 | 2 | 1 | 430 | 177 | +253 | 25 | Minor Premiers & Qualifying Finals |
| 2 | Forbes Magpies | 14 | 11 | 1 | 2 | 1 | 519 | 280 | +239 | 25 | Qualifying Finals |
| 3 | Orange CYMS | 14 | 10 | 1 | 3 | 1 | 379 | 298 | +81 | 23 | Qualifying Finals |
| 4 | Mudgee Dragons | 14 | 9 | 1 | 4 | 1 | 316 | 272 | +46 | 21 | Qualifying Finals |
| 5 | Wellington Cowboys | 14 | 9 | 0 | 5 | 1 | 388 | 304 | +84 | 20 | Elimination Finals |
| 6 | Orange Hawks | 14 | 7 | 1 | 6 | 1 | 376 | 273 | +103 | 17 | Elimination Finals |
| 7 | Bathurst St Patricks Saints | 14 | 7 | 0 | 7 | 1 | 368 | 342 | +26 | 16 | Elimination Finals |
| 8 | Dubbo Macquarie Raiders | 14 | 6 | 0 | 8 | 1 | 302 | 386 | –84 | 14 | Elimination Finals |
| 9 | Parkes Spacemen | 14 | 5 | 0 | 9 | 1 | 348 | 458 | -110 | 12 | |
| 10 | Nyngan Tigers | 14 | 3 | 1 | 10 | 1 | 282 | 428 | -146 | 9 | |
| 11 | Bathurst Panthers | 14 | 2 | 0 | 12 | 1 | 236 | 484 | -248 | 6 | |
| 12 | Lithgow Workies Wolves | 14 | 1 | 0 | 13 | 1 | 194 | 438 | -246 | 4 | |

Updated to match(es) played on 1 September. Source:
Rules for classification: 1) points; 2) point difference; 3) points scored

==== Ladder progression ====
- Numbers highlighted in green indicate that the team finished the round inside the top 8.
- Numbers highlighted in blue indicates the team finished first on the ladder in that round.
- Numbers highlighted in red indicates the team finished last place on the ladder in that round.
- Underlined numbers indicate that the team had a bye during that round.

| Pos | Team | 1 | 2 | 3 | 4 | 5 | 6 | 7 | 8 | 9 | 10 | 11 | 12 | 13 | 14 | 15 |
|---|---|---|---|---|---|---|---|---|---|---|---|---|---|---|---|---|
| 1 | Dubbo CYMS Fishies | 2 | 4 | 6 | 8 | 8 | 8 | 10 | 12 | 14 | 16 | 18 | 20 | 22 | 23 | 25 |
| 2 | Forbes Magpies | 2 | 4 | 6 | 6 | 8 | 10 | 12 | 13 | 15 | 15 | 17 | 19 | 21 | 23 | 25 |
| 3 | Orange CYMS | 2 | 2 | 4 | 6 | 6 | 8 | 10 | 12 | 14 | 16 | 18 | 20 | 20 | 21 | 23 |
| 4 | Mudgee Dragons | 0 | 2 | 4 | 6 | 8 | 10 | 12 | 12 | 14 | 16 | 18 | 18 | 18 | 19 | 21 |
| 5 | Wellington Cowboys | 2 | 4 | 4 | 6 | 8 | 8 | 10 | 12 | 14 | 14 | 14 | 16 | 18 | 20 | 20 |
| 6 | Orange Hawks | 2 | 2 | 2 | 2 | 4 | 4 | 6 | 7 | 9 | 11 | 11 | 11 | 13 | 15 | 17 |
| 7 | Bathurst St Patricks Saints | 2 | 2 | 4 | 6 | 8 | 8 | 10 | 10 | 10 | 12 | 14 | 14 | 16 | 16 | 16 |
| 8 | Dubbo Macquarie Raiders | 0 | 0 | 0 | 2 | 4 | 6 | 8 | 8 | 8 | 8 | 8 | 10 | 10 | 12 | 14 |
| 9 | Parkes Spacemen | 0 | 2 | 4 | 4 | 4 | 4 | 4 | 6 | 6 | 8 | 8 | 10 | 12 | 12 | 12 |
| 10 | Nyngan Tigers | 0 | 2 | 2 | 2 | 2 | 4 | 6 | 6 | 6 | 6 | 8 | 8 | 8 | 9 | 9 |
| 11 | Bathurst Panthers | 0 | 0 | 0 | 0 | 0 | 0 | 2 | 4 | 4 | 4 | 4 | 4 | 6 | 6 | 6 |
| 12 | Lithgow Workies Wolves | 0 | 0 | 0 | 0 | 0 | 2 | 4 | 4 | 4 | 4 | 4 | 4 | 4 | 4 | 4 |

Season Results:

| Home | Score | Away | Match Information |
| Home | Score | Away | Date and Time | Venue | Referee | Video |
|---|---|---|---|---|---|---|
Round 1 (ANZAC Round)
| Bathurst St Patricks Saints | 30 – 10 | Bathurst Panthers | Saturday, 26 April, 3:30pm | Jack Arrow Sporting Complex | Nick McGrath |
| Dubbo Macquarie Raiders | 18 – 20 | Dubbo CYMS Fishies | Sunday, 27 April, 2:00pm | Apex Oval | Mick Madgwick |
| Wellington Cowboys | 20 – 0 | Nyngan Tigers | Sunday, 27 April, 2:00pm | Kennard Park | Shanika Harpur |
| Lithgow Workies Wolves | 10 – 26 | Orange Hawks | Sunday, 27 April, 2:00pm | Tony Luchetti Sportsground | Anthony Pond |
| Orange CYMS | 20 – 18 | Mudgee Dragons | Sunday, 27 April, 2:00pm | Wade Park | Bryce Hotham |
| Forbes Magpies | 46 – 16 | Parkes Spacemen | Sunday, 27 April, 2:00pm | Spooner Oval | Justin Walker |
Round 2
| Nyngan Tigers | 42 – 12 | Lithgow Workies Wolves | Saturday, 3 May, 3:30pm | Larkin Oval | Mick Madgwick |
| Forbes Magpies | 38 – 18 | Orange CYMS | Sunday, 4 May, 2:00pm | Spooner Oval | Mick Madgwick |
| Dubbo CYMS Fishies | 62 – 6 | Bathurst Panthers | Sunday, 4 May, 2:00pm | Apex Oval | Justin Walker |
| Mudgee Dragons | 28 – 14 | Dubbo Macquarie Raiders | Sunday, 4 May, 2:00pm | Glen Willow Regional Sports Stadium | Anthony Pond |
| Bathurst St Patricks Saints | 26 – 30 | Parkes Spacemen | Sunday, 4 May, 2:00pm | Jack Arrow Sporting Complex | Nick McGrath |
| Orange Hawks | 20 – 26 | Wellington Cowboys | Sunday, 4 May, 2:00pm | Wade Park | Max Biles |
Round 3 (Women in League Round)
| Orange CYMS | 17 – 16 | Orange Hawks | Sunday, 11 May, 2:00pm | Wade Park | Anthony Pond |
| Mudgee Dragons | 24 – 18 | Bathurst Panthers | Sunday, 11 May, 2:00pm | Glen Willow Regional Sports Stadium | Nick McGrath |
| Lithgow Workies Wolves | 16 – 64 | Bathurst St Patricks Saints | Sunday, 11 May, 2:00pm | Tony Luchetti Sportsground | Bryce Hotham |
| Dubbo Macquarie Raiders | 12 – 32 | Forbes Magpies | Sunday, 11 May, 2:00pm | Apex Oval | Shanika Harpur |
| Parkes Spacemen | 28 – 24 | Nyngan Tigers | Sunday, 11 May, 2:00pm | Pioneer Oval | Justin Walker |
| Wellington Cowboys | 10 – 26 | Dubbo CYMS Fishies | Sunday, 11 May, 2:00pm | Kennard Park | Mick Madgwick |
Round 4
| Wellington Cowboys | 46 – 24 | Forbes Magpies | Sunday, 18 May, 2:00pm | Kennard Park | Anthony Pond |
| Nyngan Tigers | 8 – 20 | Dubbo CYMS Fishies | Sunday, 18 May, 2:00pm | Larkin Oval | Stuart Duff |
| Dubbo Macquarie Raiders | 34 – 28 | Parkes Spacemen | Sunday, 18 May, 2:00pm | Apex Oval | Mick Madgwick |
| Bathurst St Patricks Saints | 26 – 14 | Orange Hawks | Sunday, 18 May, 2:00pm | Jack Arrow Sporting Complex | Josh Williamson |
| Mudgee Dragons | 10 – 4 | Lithgow Workies Wolves | Sunday, 18 May, 2:00pm | Glen Willow Regional Sports Stadium | Shanika Harpur |
| Orange CYMS | 24 – 16 | Bathurst Panthers | Sunday, 18 May, 2:00pm | Wade Park | Nick McGrath |
Round 5
| Bathurst Panthers | 16 – 30 | Bathurst St Patricks Saints | Saturday, 24 May, 3:30pm | Carrington Park | Bryce Hotham |
| Mudgee Dragons | 34 – 24 | Orange CYMS | Sunday, 25 May, 2:00pm | Glen Willow Regional Sports Stadium | Nick Lander |
| Orange Hawks | 42 – 6 | Lithgow Workies Wolves | Sunday, 25 May, 2:00pm | Wade Park | Mick Madgwick |
| Wellington Cowboys | 58 – 18 | Parkes Spacemen | Sunday, 25 May, 2:00pm | Kennard Park | Stuart Duff |
| Dubbo Macquarie Raiders | 38 – 28 | Nyngan Tigers | Sunday, 25 May, 2:00pm | Apex Oval | Shanika Harpur |
| Forbes Magpies | 19 – 18 | Dubbo CYMS Fishies | Sunday, 25 May, 2:00pm | Spooner Oval | Anthony Pond |
Round 6
| Forbes Magpies | 44 – 20 | Bathurst St Patricks Saints | Sunday, 1 June, 2:00pm | Spooner Oval | TBA |
| Bathurst Panthers | 30 – 34 | Dubbo Macquarie Raiders | Sunday, 1 June, 2:00pm | Carrington Park | TBA |
| Orange CYMS | 36 – 26 | Parkes Spacemen | Sunday, 1 June, 2:00pm | Wade Park | TBA |
| Lithgow Workies Wolves | 26 – 18 | Wellington Cowboys | Sunday, 1 June, 2:00pm | Tony Luchetti Sportsground | TBA |
| Dubbo CYMS Fishies | 12 – 26 | Mudgee Dragons | Sunday, 1 June, 2:00pm | Apex Oval | TBA |
| Nyngan Tigers | 18 – 12 | Orange Hawks | Sunday, 1 June, 2:00pm | Larkin Oval | TBA |
Round 7
| Parkes Spacemen | 6 – 50 | Forbes Magpies | Sunday, 8 June, 2:00pm | Pioneer Oval | TBA |
| Dubbo Macquarie Raiders | BYE | Nyngan Tigers |
| Dubbo CYMS Fishies | BYE | Lithgow Workies Wolves |
| Orange CYMS | BYE | Bathurst St Patricks Saints |
| Orange Hawks | BYE | Mudgee Dragons |
| Wellington Cowboys | BYE | Bathurst Panthers |
Round 8
| Nyngan Tigers | 18 – 20 | Bathurst Panthers | Sunday, 15 June, 2:00pm | Larkin Oval | Stuart Duff |
| Dubbo Macquarie Raiders | 24 – 28 | Orange CYMS | Sunday, 15 June, 2:00pm | Apex Oval | Mick Madgwick |
| Parkes Spacemen | 36 – 14 | Lithgow Workies Wolves | Sunday, 15 June, 2:00pm | Pioneer Oval | Nick Lander |
| Bathurst St Patricks Saints | 18 – 24 | Dubbo CYMS Fishies | Sunday, 15 June, 2:00pm | Jack Arrow Sporting Complex | Shanika Harpur |
| Orange Hawks | 36 – 36 | Forbes Magpies | Sunday, 15 June, 2:00pm | Wade Park | Bryce Hotham |
| Wellington Cowboys | 28 – 22 | Mudgee Dragons | Sunday, 15 June, 2:00pm | Kennard Park | Anthony Pond |
Round 9 (Beanies for Brain Cancer Round)
| Orange CYMS | 38 – 30 | Lithgow Workies Wolves | Saturday, 21 June, 3:30pm | Wade Park | Nick McGrath |
| Dubbo Macquarie Raiders | 10 – 12 | Wellington Cowboys | Sunday, 22 June, 2:00pm | Apex Oval | Bryce Hotham |
| Parkes Spacemen | 6 – 42 | Dubbo CYMS Fishies | Sunday, 22 June, 2:00pm | Pioneer Oval | Mick Madgwick |
| Forbes Magpies | 30 – 26 | Nyngan Tigers | Sunday, 22 June, 2:00pm | Spooner Oval | Stuart Duff |
| Bathurst Panthers | 6 – 46 | Orange Hawks | Sunday, 22 June, 2:00pm | Carrington Park | Anthony Pond |
| Mudgee Dragons | 20 – 16 | Bathurst St Patricks Saints | Sunday, 22 June, 2:00pm | Glen Willow Regional Sports Stadium | Nick Lander |
Round 10 (First Nations Round)
| Mudgee Dragons | 30 – 26 | Forbes Magpies | Saturday, 28 June, 3:30pm | Glen Willow Regional Sports Stadium | Nick McGrath |
| Wellington Cowboys | 12 – 38 | Orange CYMS | Sunday, 29 June, 2:00pm | Kennard Park | Bryce Hotham |
| Dubbo CYMS Fishies | 44 – 10 | Lithgow Workies Wolves | Sunday, 29 June, 2:00pm | Apex Oval | Max Maguire-Allen |
| Parkes Spacemen | 56 – 10 | Bathurst Panthers | Sunday, 29 June, 2:00pm | Pioneer Oval | Stuart Duff |
| Bathurst St Patricks Saints | 48 – 20 | Nyngan Tigers | Sunday, 29 June, 2:00pm | Jack Arrow Sporting Complex | Brodie Easey |
| Orange Hawks | 48 – 6 | Dubbo Macquarie Raiders | Sunday, 29 June, 2:00pm | Wade Park | Anthony Pond |
Round 11
| Bathurst St Patricks Saints | 24 – 20 | Lithgow Workies Wolves | Saturday, 12 July, 3:30pm | Jack Arrow Sporting Complex | TBA |
| Bathurst Panthers | 16 – 30 | Mudgee Dragons | Saturday, 12 July, 3:30pm | Carrington Park | TBA |
| Orange Hawks | 18 – 34 | Orange CYMS | Sunday, 13 July, 2:00pm | Wade Park | TBA |
| Forbes Magpies | 60 – 0 | Dubbo Macquarie Raiders | Sunday, 13 July, 2:00pm | Spooner Oval | TBA |
| Nyngan Tigers | 48 – 24 | Parkes Spacemen | Sunday, 13 July, 2:00pm | Larkin Oval | TBA |
| Dubbo CYMS Fishies | 26 – 6 | Wellington Cowboys | Sunday, 13 July, 2:00pm | Apex Oval | TBA |
Round 12 (Licensed Clubs Round)
| Lithgow Workies Wolves | 10 – 40 | Dubbo Macquarie Raiders | Sunday, 20 July, 2:00pm | Tony Luchetti Sportsground | TBA |
| Wellington Cowboys | 46 – 10 | Bathurst St Patricks Saints | Sunday, 20 July, 2:00pm | Kennard Park | TBA |
| Bathurst Panthers | 10 – 52 | Forbes Magpies | Sunday, 20 July, 2:00pm | Carrington Park | TBA |
| Dubbo CYMS Fishies | 44 – 16 | Orange Hawks | Sunday, 20 July, 2:00pm | Apex Oval | TBA |
| Parkes Spacemen | 34 – 20 | Mudgee Dragons | Sunday, 20 July, 2:00pm | Pioneer Oval | TBA |
| Orange CYMS | 52 – 10 | Nyngan Tigers | Sunday, 20 July, 2:00pm | Wade Park | TBA |
Round 13
| Mudgee Dragons | 12 – 24 | Orange Hawks | Saturday, 26 July, 3:30pm | Glen Willow Regional Sports Stadium | Anthony Pond |
| Lithgow Workies Wolves | 20 – 26 | Bathurst Panthers | Saturday, 26 July, 3:30pm | Tony Luchetti Sportsground | Mick Madgwick |
| Bathurst St Patricks Saints | 22 – 14 | Orange CYMS | Sunday, 27 July, 2:00pm | Jack Arrow Sporting Complex | Bryce Hotham |
| Dubbo CYMS Fishies | 20 – 12 | Dubbo Macquarie Raiders | Sunday, 27 July, 2:00pm | Apex Oval | Stuart Duff |
| Nyngan Tigers | 4 – 38 | Wellington Cowboys | Sunday, 27 July, 2:00pm | Larkin Oval | Shanika Harpur |
| Parkes Spacemen | BYE | Forbes Magpies |
Round 14
| Lithgow Workies Wolves | 10 – 14 | Forbes Magpies | Saturday, 2 August, 3:30pm | Tony Luchetti Sportsground | Justin Walker |
| Orange CYMS | 14 – 14 | Dubbo CYMS Fishies | Saturday, 2 August, 3:30pm | Wade Park | Bryce Hotham |
| Bathurst Panthers | 32 – 36 | Wellington Cowboys | Sunday, 3 August, 2:00pm | Carrington Park | Mick Madgwick |
| Nyngan Tigers | 28 – 28 | Mudgee Dragons | Sunday, 3 August, 2:00pm | Larkin Oval | Nick McGrath |
| Dubbo Macquarie Raiders | 34 – 18 | Bathurst St Patricks Saints | Sunday, 3 August, 2:00pm | Apex Oval | Stuart Duff |
| Orange Hawks | 24 – 16 | Parkes Spacemen | Sunday, 3 August, 2:00pm | Wade Park | Anthony Pond |
Round 15
| Lithgow Workies Wolves | 6 – 14 | Mudgee Dragons | Saturday, 9 August, 3:30pm | Tony Luchetti Sportsground | Stuart Duff |
| Orange Hawks | 34 – 16 | Bathurst St Patricks Saints | Sunday, 10 August, 2:00pm | Wade Park | Nick McGrath |
| Bathurst Panthers | 20 – 22 | Orange CYMS | Sunday, 10 August, 2:00pm | Carrington Park | Shanika Harpur |
| Dubbo CYMS Fishies | 58 – 8 | Nyngan Tigers | Sunday, 10 August, 2:00pm | Apex Oval | Mick Madgwick |
| Forbes Magpies | 48 – 32 | Wellington Cowboys | Sunday, 10 August, 2:00pm | Spooner Oval | Anthony Pond |
| Parkes Spacemen | 24 – 26 | Dubbo Macquarie Raiders | Sunday, 10 August, 2:00pm | Pioneer Oval | Bryce Hotham |
Finals Series
Qualifying & Elimination Finals
| Forbes Magpies | 32 – 0 | Orange CYMS | Saturday, 16 August, 2:00pm | Spooner Oval | Nick McGrath |
| Orange Hawks | 18 – 10 | Bathurst St Patricks Saints | Saturday, 16 August, 2:10pm | Wade Park | Anthony Pond |
| Wellington Cowboys | 32 – 12 | Dubbo Macquarie Raiders | Sunday, 17 August, 2:10pm | Kennard Park | Bryce Hotham |
| Dubbo CYMS Fishies | 16 – 12 | Mudgee Dragons | Sunday, 17 August, 2:30pm | Apex Oval | Stuart Duff |
Semi-Finals
| Mudgee Dragons | 26 – 22 | Wellington Cowboys | Sunday, 24 August, 2:00pm | Glen Willow Regional Sports Stadium | Anthony Pond |
| Orange CYMS | 28 – 24 | Orange Hawks | Sunday, 24 August, 2:00pm | Wade Park | Bryce Hotham |
Preliminary Finals
| Forbes Magpies | 34 – 10 | Mudgee Dragons | Sunday, 31 August, 2:00pm | Spooner Oval | Anthony Pond |
| Dubbo CYMS Fishies | 24 – 0 | Orange CYMS | Sunday, 31 August, 2:30pm | Apex Oval | Bryce Hotham |
Grand Final
| Dubbo CYMS Fishies | 23 – 22 | Forbes Magpies | Sunday, 7 September, 3:00pm | Apex Oval | Anthony Pond |

==== Grand Final ====
Qualifying & Elimination Finals
1 | Dubbo CYMS | 16
4 | Mudgee | 12
5 | Wellington | 32
8 | Dubbo Macquarie | 12
6 | Orange | 18
7 | Bathurst St Patricks | 10
2 | Forbes | 32
3 | Orange CYMS | 0

Semi-Finals
4 | Mudgee | 26
5 | Wellington | 22
3 | Orange CYMS | 28
6 | Orange | 24

Preliminary Finals
1 | Dubbo CYMS | 24
3 | Orange CYMS | 0
2 | Forbes | 34
4 | Mudgee | 10

Grand Final
1 | Dubbo CYMS | 23
2 | Forbes | 22

2025 Peter McDonald Premiership Grand Final

Sunday, 7 September
3:00pm

| Dubbo CYMS Fishies | 23 – 22 | Forbes Magpies |
|---|---|---|
| Tries: Zac Williams (26') 1 Mitchell Cleary (33') 1 Jeremy Thurston (43') 1 Billy Sing (47') 1 Goals: Jeremy Thurston 3/4 (34', 44', 49'); Field goals: Jeremy Thurston (96') 1 | 1st: 10 – 10; 2nd: 12 – 12; ET: 0 – 0 GP: 1 – 0 | Tries: 1 (10') Chad Porter; 1 (37') Farren Lamb; 1 (55') Traie Merritt; 1 (65') Harrison Leadbitter; Goals: 3/4 Nicholas Greenhalgh (11', 57', 67') |

Apex Oval, Dubbo
Referee: Anthony Pond
Touch judges: Bryce Hotham & Nathan Blanchard
In Goal judges: Justin Walker & Stuart Duff

Team details
| Dubbo CYMS | | Position | Forbes |
| Name | Number | Position | Number | Name |
|---|---|---|---|---|
| Jeremy Thurston | 1 | Fullback | 1 | Jack Smith |
| Vuniani Gutabua | 2 | Wing | 2 | Connor Greenhalgh |
| Jyie Chapman | 3 | Centre | 16 | Mitchell Andrews |
| Zac Williams | 4 | Centre | 4 | Farren Lamb |
| Ratu Peceli Roko | 5 | Wing | 5 | Zeke Hartwig |
| Claude Gordon | 6 | Five eighth | 6 | Chad Porter |
| Bayden Searle | 7 | Half back | 7 | Nicholas Greenhalgh |
| Jarryn Powyer | 8 | Prop forward | 8 | Jack Hartwig |
| Alex Bonham | 9 | Hooker | 9 | Hayden Bolam |
| Jaymn Cleary | 10 | Prop forward | 10 | Nick Booth |
| Jordan Reynolds | 11 | Second row | 11 | Harrison Leadbitter |
| Billy Sing | 12 | Second row | 12 | Traie Merritt |
| Mitchell Cleary | 13 | Lock forward | 13 | Jake Porter |
| Troyen Dixon | 14 | Interchange | 14 | Jordan Hartwig |
| Jack Quinn | 15 | Interchange | 15 | Mick Coady |
| Ben Marlin | 16 | Interchange | 17 | Aaron Mawhinney |
| Corey Drew | 19 | Interchange | 18 | Ben Maguire |
| Shaun Townsend | | Coach | | Cameron Greenhalgh |

== Southern Corridor Region ==
=== Group 7 Premiership ===
The Group 7 Premiership (named the South Coast Group 7 First Grade Premiership) is a South Coast based men's first grade rugby league competition that features teams from the South Coast & Illawarra district. This competition feeds into the St George Illawarra Dragons New South Wales Cup team.

==== Teams ====
Initially the same 10 teams as 2024 were scheduled to compete, but in February, Warilla-Lake South announced they were pulling out of first grade with a view of returning in 2026.

| Colours | Club | NSW Cup Affiliate | Home ground(s) | Head coach |
|---|---|---|---|---|
| | Albion Park-Oak Flats Eagles | St George Illawarra Dragons | Centenary Field | TBA |
| | Berry-Shoalhaven Heads Magpies | St George Illawarra Dragons | Berry Showground | TBA |
| | Gerringong Lions | St George Illawarra Dragons | Michael Cronin Oval | TBA |
| | Jamberoo Superoos | St George Illawarra Dragons | Kevin Walsh Oval | TBA |
| | Kiama Knights | St George Illawarra Dragons | Kiama Showground | TBA |
| | Milton-Ulladulla Bulldogs | St George Illawarra Dragons | Bill Andriske Oval | TBA |
| | Nowra-Bomaderry Jets | St George Illawarra Dragons | Bomaderry Sporting Complex | TBA |
| | Shellharbour City Sharks | St George Illawarra Dragons | Ron Costello Oval | TBA |
| | Shellharbour Stingrays | St George Illawarra Dragons | Flinders Field | TBA |

| State Map | Gerringong Map |
|---|---|
| Home Venues | Home Venues |

==== Ladder ====
| Pos | Team | Pld | W | D | L | B | PF | PA | PD | Pts | Qualification |
|---|---|---|---|---|---|---|---|---|---|---|---|
| 1 | Shellharbour City Sharks | 16 | 11 | 1 | 4 | 2 | 448 | 227 | +221 | 27 | Minor Premiers & Major Semi-Final |
| 2 | Kiama Knights | 16 | 11 | 1 | 4 | 2 | 370 | 166 | +204 | 27 | Qualifying Final |
| 3 | Albion Park-Oak Flats Eagles | 16 | 10 | 1 | 5 | 2 | 400 | 254 | +146 | 25 | Qualifying Final |
| 4 | Shellharbour Stingrays | 16 | 10 | 1 | 5 | 2 | 386 | 275 | +111 | 25 | Elimination Final |
| 5 | Gerringong Lions | 16 | 10 | 0 | 6 | 2 | 319 | 220 | +99 | 24 | Elimination Final |
| 6 | Milton-Ulladulla Bulldogs | 16 | 6 | 0 | 10 | 2 | 267 | 336 | –69 | 16 | |
| 7 | Jamberoo Superoos | 16 | 4 | 0 | 12 | 2 | 276 | 450 | -164 | 12 | |
| 8 | Nowra-Bomaderry Jets | 16 | 4 | 0 | 12 | 2 | 250 | 506 | -256 | 12 | |
| 9 | Berry-Shoalhaven Heads Magpies | 16 | 4 | 0 | 12 | 2 | 232 | 524 | -296 | 12 | |

Updated to match(es) played on 1 September. Source:
Rules for classification: 1) points; 2) point difference; 3) points scored

==== Ladder progression ====
- Numbers highlighted in green indicate that the team finished the round inside the top 5.
- Numbers highlighted in blue indicates the team finished first on the ladder in that round.
- Numbers highlighted in red indicates the team finished last place on the ladder in that round.
- Underlined numbers indicate that the team had a bye during that round.

| Pos | Team | 1 | 2 | 3 | 5 | 6 | 8 | 9 | 10 | 11 | 12 | 7 | 13 | 14 | 15 | 16 | 4 | 17 | 18 |
|---|---|---|---|---|---|---|---|---|---|---|---|---|---|---|---|---|---|---|---|
| 1 | Shellharbour City Sharks | 2 | 4 | 4 | 6 | 8 | 10 | 12 | 14 | 16 | 18 | 18 | 18 | 19 | 21 | 23 | 23 | 25 | 27 |
| 2 | Kiama Knights | 2 | 2 | 4 | 6 | 8 | 10 | 10 | 12 | 14 | 14 | 15 | 17 | 19 | 21 | 21 | 23 | 25 | 27 |
| 3 | Albion Park-Oak Flats Eagles | 2 | 4 | 4 | 6 | 8 | 10 | 10 | 10 | 12 | 14 | 15 | 17 | 17 | 19 | 21 | 21 | 23 | 25 |
| 4 | Shellharbour Stingrays | 0 | 2 | 4 | 8 | 8 | 10 | 12 | 14 | 14 | 16 | 18 | 20 | 21 | 23 | 25 | 25 | 25 | 25 |
| 5 | Gerringong Lions | 2 | 2 | 4 | 6 | 6 | 6 | 8 | 10 | 12 | 14 | 16 | 18 | 20 | 20 | 20 | 20 | 22 | 24 |
| 6 | Milton-Ulladulla Bulldogs | 2 | 2 | 4 | 4 | 4 | 6 | 8 | 8 | 10 | 10 | 10 | 10 | 10 | 10 | 12 | 12 | 14 | 16 |
| 7 | Jamberoo Superoos | 0 | 2 | 4 | 6 | 8 | 8 | 8 | 8 | 8 | 8 | 10 | 12 | 12 | 12 | 12 | 12 | 12 | 12 |
| 8 | Nowra-Bomaderry Jets | 0 | 2 | 2 | 4 | 4 | 4 | 4 | 6 | 6 | 8 | 8 | 8 | 10 | 10 | 12 | 12 | 12 | 12 |
| 9 | Berry-Shoalhaven Heads Magpies | 0 | 0 | 0 | 2 | 4 | 4 | 6 | 6 | 6 | 6 | 8 | 8 | 10 | 12 | 12 | 12 | 12 | 12 |

Season Results:

| Home | Score | Away | Match Information |
| Home | Score | Away | Date and Time | Venue | Referee | Video |
|---|---|---|---|---|---|---|
Round 1
| Gerringong Lions | 28 – 6 | Berry-Shoalhaven Heads Magpies | Saturday, 5 April, 3:00pm | Michael Cronin Oval | Jeremy Geordan |
| Albion Park-Oak Flats Eagles | 28 – 8 | Shellharbour Stingrays | Saturday, 5 April, 7:00pm | Centenary Field | Tyron Jordan |
| Kiama Knights | 26 – 0 | Jamberoo Superoos | Sunday, 6 April, 3:00pm | Kiama Showground | Michael Booth |
| Milton-Ulladulla Bulldogs | 28 – 22 | Nowra-Bomaderry Jets | Sunday, 6 April, 3:00pm | Bill Andriske Oval | Will Drury |
| Shellharbour City Sharks | | BYE |
Round 2
| Berry-Shoalhaven Heads Magpies | 6 – 50 | Shellharbour City Sharks | Saturday, 12 April, 3:00pm | Berry Showground | Balunn Simon |
| Jamberoo Superoos | 24 – 6 | Gerringong Lions | Saturday, 12 April, 3:00pm | Kevin Walsh Oval | Michael Booth |
| Nowra-Bomaderry Jets | 16 – 14 | Kiama Knights | Sunday, 13 April, 3:00pm | Bomaderry Sporting Complex | Jeremy Geordan |
| Shellharbour Stingrays | 36 – 6 | Milton-Ulladulla Bulldogs | Sunday, 13 April, 3:00pm | Flinders Field | Tyron Jordan |
| Albion Park-Oak Flats Eagles | | BYE |
Round 3 (ANZAC Round)
| Jamberoo Superoos | 36 – 0 | Nowra-Bomaderry Jets | Saturday, 26 April, 3:00pm | Kevin Walsh Oval | Tyron Jordan |
| Milton-Ulladulla Bulldogs | 14 – 6 | Albion Park-Oak Flats Eagles | Saturday, 26 April, 3:00pm | Bill Andriske Oval | Jeremy Geordan |
| Kiama Knights | 12 – 0 | Shellharbour City Sharks | Sunday, 27 April, 3:00pm | Kiama Showground | Michael Booth |
| Shellharbour Stingrays | 48 – 14 | Berry-Shoalhaven Heads Magpies | Sunday, 27 April, 3:00pm | Flinders Field | Balunn Simon |
| Gerringong Lions | | BYE |
Round 4
| Gerringong Lions | 16 – 12 | Milton-Ulladulla Bulldogs | Saturday, 3 May, 3:00pm | Michael Cronin Oval | Jeremy Geordan |
| Shellharbour City Sharks | 32 – 24 | Albion Park-Oak Flats Eagles | Sunday, 4 May, 3:00pm | Ron Costello Oval | Balunn Simon |
| Nowra-Bomaderry Jets | 12 – 42 | Shellharbour Stingrays | Sunday, 4 May, 3:00pm | Bomaderry Sporting Complex | Michael Booth |
| Berry-Shoalhaven Heads Magpies | 4 – 26 | Kiama Knights | Wednesday, 20 August, 7:00pm | Bomaderry Sporting Complex | Tate Hoobin |
| Jamberoo Superoos | | BYE |
Round 5
| Berry-Shoalhaven Heads Magpies | 20 – 18 | Jamberoo Superoos | Saturday, 10 May, 3:00pm | Berry Showground | Balunn Simon |
| Albion Park-Oak Flats Eagles | 20 – 6 | Gerringong Lions | Saturday, 10 May, 3:00pm | Centenary Field | Michael Booth |
| Shellharbour Stingrays | 12 – 8 | Shellharbour City Sharks | Sunday, 11 May, 3:00pm | Flinders Field | Bailey Warren |
| Milton-Ulladulla Bulldogs | 6 – 22 | Kiama Knights | Sunday, 11 May, 3:00pm | Bill Andriske Oval | Jeremy Geordan |
| Nowra-Bomaderry Jets | | BYE |
Round 6 (Women in League Round)
| Jamberoo Superoos | 16 – 14 | Shellharbour Stingrays | Saturday, 17 May, 3:00pm | Kevin Walsh Oval | Bailey Warren |
| Shellharbour City Sharks | 16 – 0 | Milton-Ulladulla Bulldogs | Sunday, 18 May, 3:00pm | Ron Costello Oval | Tate Hoobin |
| Nowra-Bomaderry Jets | 10 – 20 | Albion Park-Oak Flats Eagles | Sunday, 18 May, 3:00pm | Bomaderry Sporting Complex | Jeremy Geordan |
| Kiama Knights | 16 – 8 | Gerringong Lions | Sunday, 18 May, 3:00pm | Kiama Showground | Michael Booth |
| Berry-Shoalhaven Heads Magpies | | BYE |
Round 7
| Gerringong Lions | 13 – 12 | Shellharbour City Sharks | Saturday, 12 July, 3:00pm | Michael Cronin Oval | Bailey Warren |
| Milton-Ulladulla Bulldogs | 12 – 26 | Jamberoo Superoos | Saturday, 12 July, 3:00pm | Bill Andriske Oval | Tyron Jordan |
| Nowra-Bomaderry Jets | 24 – 30 | Berry-Shoalhaven Heads Magpies | Sunday, 13 July, 3:00pm | Bomaderry Sporting Complex | Dane Chamberlain |
| Albion Park-Oak Flats Eagles | 14 – 14 | Kiama Knights | Sunday, 13 July, 3:00pm | Centenary Field | Jeremy Geordan |
| Shellharbour Stingrays | | BYE |
Round 8 (Magic Round)
| Berry-Shoalhaven Heads Magpies | 12 – 40 | Milton-Ulladulla Bulldogs | Saturday, 31 May, 12:00pm | Bomaderry Sporting Complex | Jeremy Geordan |
| Jamberoo Superoos | 12 – 42 | Albion Park-Oak Flats Eagles | Saturday, 31 May, 1:45pm | Bomaderry Sporting Complex | Ryan Micallef |
| Nowra-Bomaderry Jets | 16 – 32 | Shellharbour City Sharks | Saturday, 31 May, 3:30pm | Bomaderry Sporting Complex | Tate Hoobin |
| Shellharbour Stingrays | 10 – 6 | Gerringong Lions | Saturday, 31 May, 5:15pm | Bomaderry Sporting Complex | Balunn Simon |
| Kiama Knights | | BYE |
Round 9
| Gerringong Lions | 30 – 18 | Nowra-Bomaderry Jets | Saturday, 14 June, 3:00pm | Michael Cronin Oval | Michael Booth |
| Shellharbour City Sharks | 28 – 24 | Jamberoo Superoos | Sunday, 15 June, 3:00pm | Ron Costello Oval | Bailey Warren |
| Albion Park-Oak Flats Eagles | 16 – 32 | Berry-Shoalhaven Heads Magpies | Sunday, 15 June, 3:00pm | Centenary Field | Balunn Simon |
| Kiama Knights | 22 – 26 | Shellharbour Stingrays | Sunday, 15 June, 3:00pm | Kiama Showground | Tate Hoobin |
| Milton-Ulladulla Bulldogs | | BYE |
Round 10
| Berry-Shoalhaven Heads Magpies | 6 – 44 | Gerringong Lions | Saturday, 21 June, 3:00pm | Berry Showground | Michael Booth |
| Jamberoo Superoos | 16 – 22 | Kiama Knights | Saturday, 21 June, 3:00pm | Kevin Walsh Oval | Balunn Simon |
| Nowra-Bomaderry Jets | 16 – 14 | Milton-Ulladulla Bulldogs | Sunday, 22 June, 3:00pm | Bomaderry Sporting Complex | Tate Hoobin |
| Shellharbour Stingrays | 30 – 18 | Albion Park-Oak Flats Eagles | Sunday, 22 June, 3:00pm | Flinders Field | Jeremy Geordan |
| Shellharbour City Sharks | | BYE |
Round 11
| Gerringong Lions | 26 – 18 | Jamberoo Superoos | Saturday, 28 June, 3:00pm | Michael Cronin Oval | Balunn Simon |
| Kiama Knights | 34 – 18 | Nowra-Bomaderry Jets | Saturday, 28 June, 3:00pm | Kiama Showground | Michael Booth |
| Shellharbour City Sharks | 52 – 18 | Berry-Shoalhaven Heads Magpies | Saturday, 28 June, 7:00pm | Ron Costello Oval | Tate Hoobin |
| Milton-Ulladulla Bulldogs | 21 – 4 | Shellharbour Stingrays | Sunday, 29 June, 3:00pm | Bill Andriske Oval | Bailey Warren |
| Albion Park-Oak Flats Eagles | | BYE |
Round 12 (NAIDOC Round)
| Berry-Shoalhaven Heads Magpies | 10 – 22 | Shellharbour Stingrays | Saturday, 5 July, 3:00pm | Berry Showground | Michael Booth |
| Albion Park-Oak Flats Eagles | 28 – 14 | Milton-Ulladulla Bulldogs | Saturday, 5 July, 3:00pm | Centenary Field | Tate Hoobin |
| Shellharbour City Sharks | 14 – 6 | Kiama Knights | Sunday, 6 July, 3:00pm | Ron Costello Oval | Balunn Simon |
| Nowra-Bomaderry Jets | 28 – 16 | Jamberoo Superoos | Sunday, 6 July, 3:00pm | Bomaderry Sporting Complex | Bailey Warren |
| Gerringong Lions | | BYE |
Round 13
| Milton-Ulladulla Bulldogs | 18 – 20 | Gerringong Lions | Saturday, 19 July, 3:00pm | Bill Andriske Oval | Dane Chamberlain |
| Kiama Knights | 32 – 4 | Berry-Shoalhaven Heads Magpies | Sunday, 20 July, 3:00pm | Kiama Showground | Michael Booth |
| Albion Park-Oak Flats Eagles | 36 – 12 | Shellharbour City Sharks | Sunday, 20 July, 3:00pm | Centenary Field | Bailey Warren |
| Shellharbour Stingrays | 60 – 16 | Nowra-Bomaderry Jets | Sunday, 20 July, 3:00pm | Flinders Field | Tate Hoobin |
| Jamberoo Superoos | | BYE |
Round 14
| Jamberoo Superoos | 28 – 32 | Berry-Shoalhaven Heads Magpies | Saturday, 26 July, 3:00pm | Kevin Walsh Oval | Balunn Simon |
| Gerringong Lions | 28 – 4 | Albion Park-Oak Flats Eagles | Saturday, 26 July, 3:00pm | Michael Cronin Oval | Bailey Warren |
| Kiama Knights | 46 – 6 | Milton-Ulladulla Bulldogs | Sunday, 27 July, 3:00pm | Kiama Showground | Dane Chamberlain |
| Shellharbour City Sharks | 16 – 16 | Shellharbour Stingrays | Sunday, 27 July, 3:00pm | Ron Costello Oval | Tate Hoobin |
| Nowra-Bomaderry Jets | | BYE |
Round 15
| Shellharbour Stingrays | 42 – 16 | Jamberoo Superoos | Sunday, 3 August, 3:00pm | Flinders Field | Tate Hoobin |
| Albion Park-Oak Flats Eagles | 18 – 12 | Nowra-Bomaderry Jets | Sunday, 3 August, 3:00pm | Centenary Field | Bailey Warren |
| Gerringong Lions | 2 – 16 | Kiama Knights | Saturday, 9 August, 3:00pm | Michael Cronin Oval | Michael Booth |
| Milton-Ulladulla Bulldogs | 10 – 40 | Shellharbour City Sharks | Sunday, 10 August, 3:00pm | Bill Andriske Oval | Tate Hoobin |
| Berry-Shoalhaven Heads Magpies | | BYE |
Round 16
| Berry-Shoalhaven Heads Magpies | 22 – 24 | Nowra-Bomaderry Jets | Saturday, 16 August, 3:00pm | Berry Showground | Tate Hoobin |
| Jamberoo Superoos | 22 – 40 | Milton-Ulladulla Bulldogs | Saturday, 16 August, 3:00pm | Kevin Walsh Oval | Dane Chamberlain |
| Shellharbour City Sharks | 24 – 18 | Gerringong Lions | Sunday, 17 August, 3:00pm | Ron Costello Oval | Bailey Warren |
| Kiama Knights | 18 – 26 | Albion Park-Oak Flats Eagles | Sunday, 17 August, 3:00pm | Kiama Showground | Michael Booth |
| Shellharbour Stingrays | | BYE |
Round 17
| Gerringong Lions | 22 – 10 | Shellharbour Stingrays | Saturday, 23 August, 3:00pm | Michael Cronin Oval | Bailey Warren |
| Milton-Ulladulla Bulldogs | 26 – 4 | Berry-Shoalhaven Heads Magpies | Saturday, 23 August, 3:00pm | Bill Andriske Oval | Balunn Simon |
| Shellharbour City Sharks | 64 – 12 | Nowra-Bomaderry Jets | Saturday, 23 August, 3:00pm | Ron Costello Oval | Tate Hoobin |
| Albion Park-Oak Flats Eagles | 54 – 0 | Jamberoo Superoos | Sunday, 24 August, 3:00pm | Centenary Field | Michael Booth |
| Kiama Knights | | BYE |
Round 18 (Mental Health Awareness Round)
| Berry-Shoalhaven Heads Magpies | 12 – 46 | Albion Park-Oak Flats Eagles | Saturday, 30 August, 3:00pm | Berry Showground | Michael Booth |
| Jamberoo Superoos | 4 – 48 | Shellharbour City Sharks | Saturday, 30 August, 3:00pm | Kevin Walsh Oval | Balunn Simon |
| Shellharbour Stingrays | 6 – 44 | Kiama Knights | Saturday, 30 August, 3:00pm | Flinders Field | Bailey Warren |
| Nowra-Bomaderry Jets | 6 – 46 | Gerringong Lions | Sunday, 31 August, 3:00pm | Bomaderry Sporting Complex | Tate Hoobin |
| Milton-Ulladulla Bulldogs | | BYE |
Finals Series
Qualifying & Elimination Finals
| Shellharbour Stingrays | 12 – 20 | Gerringong Lions | Saturday, 6 September, 3:00pm | Flinders Field | Bailey Warren |
| Kiama Knights | 30 – 28 | Albion Park-Oak Flats Eagles | Sunday, 7 September, 3:00pm | Kiama Showground | Tate Hoobin |
Major & Minor Semi-Finals
| Albion Park-Oak Flats Eagles | 38 – 16 | Gerringong Lions | Saturday, 13 September, 3:00pm | Centenary Field | Bailey Warren |
| Shellharbour City Sharks | 16 – 22 | Kiama Knights | Sunday, 14 September, 3:00pm | Ron Costello Oval | Tate Hoobin |
Preliminary Final
| Shellharbour City Sharks | V | Albion Park-Oak Flats Eagles | Saturday, 20 September, 3:00pm | Michael Cronin Oval | TBA |
Grand Final
| Kiama Knights | V | Preliminary Final Winner | Sunday, 28 September, 3:00pm | Centenary Field | TBA |

==== Grand Final ====
Qualifying & Elimination Finals
2 | Kiama | 30
3 | Albion Park-Oak Flats | 28
4 | Shellharbour | 12
5 | Gerringong | 20

Major Semi-Final
1 | Shellharbour City | 16
2 | Kiama | 22
Minor Semi-Final
3 | Albion Park-Oak Flats | 38
5 | Gerringong | 16

Preliminary Final
1 | Shellharbour City
3 | Albion Park-Oak Flats

Grand Final
2 | Kiama
1/3

2025 Group 7 Premiership Grand Final

Sunday, 28 September 2025
3:00pm

| Kiama Knights | v | PF Winner |

Centenary Field, Albion Park

=== Southern Sydney Gold Competition ===
The Southern Sydney Gold Competition (named the Power Waste Management Cup for sponsorship reasons) is a Sydney based men's first grade rugby league competition that features teams from the Cronulla district. This competition feeds into the Newtown Jets New South Wales Cup team.

==== Teams ====
There are multiple changes for 2025, with all St George based teams dropping out of this competition.

| Colours | Club | NSW Cup/RMC Affiliate | Home ground(s) | Head coach |
|---|---|---|---|---|
| | Como-Jannali Crocodiles | Newtown Jets | Scylla Bay Oval | TBA |
| | De La Salle Caringbah (R) | | Captain Cook Oval | TBA |
| | Engadine Dragons | Newtown Jets | ANZAC Oval | TBA |
| | Gymea Gorillas | Newtown Jets | Corea Oval | TBA |
| | St John-Bosco Bulldogs | Newtown Jets | Boystown Oval | TBA |
| | St Joseph's Joeys | Newtown Jets | Kareela Oval | TBA |

==== Ladder ====
| Pos | Team | Pld | W | D | L | B | PF | PA | PD | Pts | Qualification |
|---|---|---|---|---|---|---|---|---|---|---|---|
| 1 | De La Salle Caringbah (R) | 14 | 10 | 1 | 3 | 0 | 334 | 204 | +130 | 35 | Minor Premiers & Major Semi-Final |
| 2 | St John-Bosco Bulldogs | 14 | 9 | 1 | 4 | 0 | 374 | 171 | +203 | 33 | Major Semi-Final |
| 3 | Gymea Gorillas | 14 | 9 | 1 | 4 | 0 | 387 | 196 | +197 | 33 | Minor Semi-Final |
| 4 | St Joseph's Joeys | 14 | 9 | 1 | 4 | 0 | 330 | 200 | +130 | 33 | Minor Semi-Final |
| 5 | Como-Jannali Crocodiles | 14 | 3 | 0 | 11 | 0 | 151 | 431 | -280 | 19 | |
| 6 | Engadine Dragons | 14 | 0 | 0 | 14 | 0 | 114 | 488 | -374 | 13 | |

Updated to match(es) played on 1 September. Source:
Rules for classification: 1) points; 2) point difference; 3) points scored

==== Ladder progression ====
- Numbers highlighted in green indicate that the team finished the round inside the top 4.
- Numbers highlighted in blue indicates the team finished first on the ladder in that round.
- Numbers highlighted in red indicates the team finished last place on the ladder in that round.
- Underlined numbers indicate that the team had a bye during that round.

| Pos | Team | 1 | 2 | 3 | 4 | 5 | 6 | 8 | 9 | 10 | 11 | 12 | 7 | 13 | 14 | 15 |
|---|---|---|---|---|---|---|---|---|---|---|---|---|---|---|---|---|
| 1 | De La Salle Caringbah (R) | 1 | 4 | 6 | 9 | 10 | 11 | 14 | 17 | 20 | 23 | 26 | 29 | 32 | 35 | 35 |
| 2 | St John-Bosco Bulldogs | 3 | 6 | 8 | 9 | 12 | 15 | 16 | 19 | 20 | 23 | 26 | 29 | 32 | 33 | 33 |
| 3 | Gymea Gorillas | 3 | 6 | 8 | 11 | 14 | 17 | 18 | 19 | 22 | 25 | 28 | 29 | 30 | 33 | 33 |
| 4 | St Joseph's Joeys | 3 | 4 | 6 | 9 | 12 | 15 | 18 | 21 | 24 | 25 | 26 | 29 | 30 | 33 | 33 |
| 5 | Como-Jannali Crocodiles | 1 | 2 | 5 | 6 | 7 | 8 | 11 | 12 | 13 | 14 | 15 | 15 | 18 | 19 | 19 |
| 6 | Engadine Dragons | 1 | 2 | 3 | 4 | 5 | 6 | 7 | 8 | 9 | 10 | 11 | 12 | 12 | 13 | 13 |

Season Results:

| Home | Score | Away | Match Information |
| Home | Score | Away | Date and Time | Venue | Referee | Video |
|---|---|---|---|---|---|---|
Round 1
| Engadine Dragons | 12 – 24 | Gymea Gorillas | Saturday, 5 April, 7:00pm | ANZAC Oval | Damien Simes |
| De La Salle Caringbah (R) | 16 – 26 | St Joseph's Joeys | Sunday, 6 April, 1:30pm | Captain Cook Oval | Drew Blackman |
| St John-Bosco Bulldogs | 44 – 4 | Como-Jannali Crocodiles | Sunday, 6 April, 3:00pm | Boystown Oval | Matthew Schild |
Round 2
| Engadine Dragons | 12 – 34 | St John-Bosco Bulldogs | Saturday, 12 April, 2:50pm | ANZAC Oval | Matthew Schild |
| Como-Jannali Crocodiles | 0 – 28 | De La Salle Caringbah (R) | Saturday, 12 April, 2:50pm | Scylla Bay Oval | Damien Simes |
| Gymea Gorillas | 20 – 8 | St Joseph's Joeys | Saturday, 12 April, 3:10pm | Corea Oval | Cameron Hutchinson |
Round 3 (ANZAC Round)
| De La Salle Caringbah (R) | 20 – 20 | Gymea Gorillas | Saturday, 26 April, 3:00pm | Captain Cook Oval | Damien Simes |
| St Joseph's Joeys | 6 – 6 | St John-Bosco Bulldogs | Saturday, 26 April, 3:00pm | Kareela Oval | Drew Blackman |
| Como-Jannali Crocodiles | 20 – 10 | Engadine Dragons | Saturday, 26 April, 3:00pm | Scylla Bay Oval | Matthew Schild |
Round 4
| Engadine Dragons | 6 – 26 | De La Salle Caringbah (R) | Saturday, 3 May, 3:00pm | ANZAC Oval | Andre Gonclaves |
| St John-Bosco Bulldogs | 12 – 16 | Gymea Gorillas | Saturday, 3 May, 3:00pm | Boystown Oval | Matthew Schild |
| St Joseph's Joeys | 48 – 18 | Como-Jannali Crocodiles | Saturday, 3 May, 3:00pm | Kareela Oval | Damien Simes |
Round 5
| De La Salle Caringbah (R) | 18 – 32 | St John-Bosco Bulldogs | Saturday, 10 May, 1:30pm | Captain Cook Oval | Matthew Schild |
| Engadine Dragons | 6 – 20 | St Joseph's Joeys | Saturday, 10 May, 3:00pm | ANZAC Oval | Cameron Hutchinson |
| Gymea Gorillas | 32 – 10 | Como-Jannali Crocodiles | Saturday, 10 May, 3:00pm | Corea Oval | Damien Simes |
Round 6
| Gymea Gorillas | 58 – 0 | Engadine Dragons | Saturday, 17 May, 3:00pm | Corea Oval | Matthew Schild |
| St Joseph's Joeys | 26 – 0 | De La Salle Caringbah (R) | Saturday, 17 May, 3:00pm | Kareela Oval | Drew Blackman |
| Como-Jannali Crocodiles | 6 – 34 | St John-Bosco Bulldogs | Saturday, 17 May, 3:00pm | Scylla Bay Oval | Damien Simes |
Round 7
| St John-Bosco Bulldogs | 24 – 8 | Engadine Dragons | Saturday, 12 July, 2:10pm | Boystown Oval | TBA |
| St Joseph's Joeys | 20 – 16 | Gymea Gorillas | Saturday, 12 July, 3:00pm | Kareela Oval | TBA |
| De La Salle Caringbah (R) | 29* – 0 | Como-Jannali Crocodiles | N/A |
Round 8
| Engadine Dragons | 12 – 26 | Como-Jannali Crocodiles | Saturday, 31 May, 3:00pm | ANZAC Oval | Damien Simes |
| St John-Bosco Bulldogs | 12 – 14 | St Joseph's Joeys | Saturday, 31 May, 3:00pm | Boystown Oval | Cameron Hutchinson |
| Gymea Gorillas | 12 – 14 | De La Salle Caringbah (R) | Saturday, 31 May, 3:00pm | Corea Oval | Drew Blackman |
Round 9
| Gymea Gorillas | 16 – 28 | St John-Bosco Bulldogs | Saturday, 14 June, 3:20pm | Corea Oval | Cameron Hutchinson |
| Como-Jannali Crocodiles | 18 – 24 | St Joseph's Joeys | Saturday, 14 June, 3:30pm | Scylla Bay Oval | Drew Blackman |
| De La Salle Caringbah (R) | 43 – 18 | Engadine Dragons | Saturday, 14 June, 3:30pm | Captain Cook Oval | Andrew Nightingale |
Round 10
| St Joseph's Joeys | 44 – 8 | Engadine Dragons | Saturday, 21 June, 2:30pm | Kareela Oval | Joshua Blackman |
| Como-Jannali Crocodiles | 6 – 38 | Gymea Gorillas | Saturday, 21 June, 2:30pm | Scylla Bay Oval | Drew Blackman |
| St John-Bosco Bulldogs | 10 – 16 | De La Salle Caringbah (R) | Saturday, 21 June, 3:00pm | Boystown Oval | Alexander Pruscino |
Round 11
| Engadine Dragons | 4 – 60 | Gymea Gorillas | Saturday, 28 June, 2:30pm | ANZAC Oval | TBA |
| St John-Bosco Bulldogs | 58 – 10 | Como-Jannali Crocodiles | Saturday, 28 June, 3:00pm | Boystown Oval | TBA |
| De La Salle Caringbah (R) | 22 – 18 | St Joseph's Joeys | Saturday, 28 June, 3:00pm | Captain Cook Oval | TBA |
Round 12
| Engadine Dragons | 4 – 40 | St John-Bosco Bulldogs | Saturday, 5 July, 1:50pm | ANZAC Oval | TBA |
| Gymea Gorillas | 34 – 24 | St Joseph's Joeys | Saturday, 5 July, 3:00pm | Corea Oval | TBA |
| Como-Jannali Crocodiles | 4 – 40 | De La Salle Caringbah (R) | Saturday, 5 July, 3:10pm | Scylla Bay Oval | TBA |
Round 13
| De La Salle Caringbah (R) | 22 – 18 | Gymea Gorillas | Saturday, 19 July, 1:20pm | Captain Cook Oval | Rami Abu Mansour |
| St Joseph's Joeys | 18 – 24 | St John-Bosco Bulldogs | Saturday, 19 July, 2:00pm | Kareela Oval | Drew Blackman |
| Como-Jannali Crocodiles | 29* – 0 | Engadine Dragons | N/A |
Round 14
| Engadine Dragons | 14 – 40 | De La Salle Caringbah (R) | Saturday, 26 July, 3:00pm | ANZAC Oval | Drew Blackman |
| St John-Bosco Bulldogs | 16 – 23 | Gymea Gorillas | Saturday, 26 July, 3:00pm | Boystown Oval | Rami Abu Mansour |
| St Joseph's Joeys | 34 – 0 | Como-Jannali Crocodiles | Saturday, 26 July, 3:30pm | Kareela Oval | Damien Simes |
Round 15
| De La Salle Caringbah (R) | V | St John-Bosco Bulldogs | Washout |
| Gymea Gorillas | V | Como-Jannali Crocodiles | Washout |
| Engadine Dragons | V | St Joseph's Joeys | Washout |
Finals Series
Major & Minor Semi-Finals
| De La Salle Caringbah (R) | 16 – 17 | St John-Bosco Bulldogs | Saturday, 16 August, 1:30pm | Forshaw Oval | Cameron Hutchinson |
| Gymea Gorillas | 24 – 22 | St Joseph's Joeys | Saturday, 16 August, 3:30pm | Corea Oval | Drew Blackman |
Preliminary Final
| De La Salle Caringbah (R) | 10 – 34 | Gymea Gorillas | Saturday, 23 August, 2:40pm | Forshaw Oval | Cameron Hutchinson |
Grand Final
| St John-Bosco Bulldogs | 10 – 16 | Gymea Gorillas | Saturday, 30 August, 3:10pm | Forshaw Oval | Cameron Hutchinson |

==== Grand Final ====
Semi-Finals
1 | De La Salle | 16
2 | St John-Bosco | 17
3 | Gymea | 24
4 | St Joseph's | 22

Preliminary Final
1 | De La Salle | 10
3 | Gymea | 34

Grand Final
2 | St John-Bosco | 10
3 | Gymea | 16

2025 Southern Sydney Gold Grand Final

Saturday, 30 August 2025
3:10pm

| St John-Bosco Bulldogs | 10 – 16 | Gymea Gorillas |
|---|---|---|
| Tries: Nathan Mateer (5') 1 Logan Clinch (80') 1 Goals: Jordan Hollis 1/2 (6') | 1st: 6 – 4; 2nd: 4 – 12 | Tries: 1 (39') Lawson Cotter; 1 (53') Jordan Bradley; 1 (66') Brooklyn Berry; Goals: 2/3 Hayden McRae (55', 68') |

Forshaw Oval, Sydney
Referee: Cameron Hutchinson
Touch judges: Alexander Pruscino & Joshua Blackman

Team details
| St John-Bosco | | Position | Gymea |
| Name | Number | Position | Number | Name |
|---|---|---|---|---|
| Ryan Barden | 1 | Fullback | 1 | Corey Willis |
| Nathan Henderson | 2 | Wing | 2 | Nick Pantelis |
| Cooper Bowen | 3 | Centre | 3 | Lawson Cotter |
| Luke Mason | 4 | Centre | 4 | Ryan Peake |
| Harry Cox | 5 | Wing | 5 | Brooklyn Berry |
| Logan Clinch | 6 | Five eighth | 6 | Nathan Wynn |
| Blake Wardrobe | 7 | Half back | 7 | Cooper Ferrow |
| Nathan Mateer | 8 | Prop forward | 8 | Matt Bird |
| Jye Bowen | 9 | Hooker | 9 | Hayden McRae |
| Jordan Hollis (c) | 10 | Prop forward | 10 | Ethan Ward |
| Monty Raper | 11 | Second row | 11 | Hayden Budd |
| Abraham Peters | 12 | Second row | 12 | Mitchell Hodgson |
| Jordan McGrath | 13 | Lock forward | 13 | Josh Sidoti |
| Scott Allen | 14 | Interchange | 14 | Logan O'Grady |
| Kurtis Smith | 15 | Interchange | 15 | Dallas Blackburn Kingi |
| Josh Studdon | 16 | Interchange | 16 | Brendon Smith |
| Ben Metcalfe | 17 | Interchange | 17 | Hemi Blackburn Kingi |
| Jack Metcalfe | 18 | Concussion substitute | 18 | Dallas Collins |
| Ryan Burke | 19 | Interchange | 19 | Jordan Bradley |
| | | Interchange | 20 | Mitch Wynn |
| | | Interchange | 21 | Jed Loader |
| | | Interchange | 22 | Flynn Pickering |
| | | Interchange | 23 | Nathan Lloyd |
| | | Interchange | 24 | James Spencer |
| Gavin Clinch & Mick Clinch | | Coach | | Luke Phillips & Paul Homann |

== Western Sydney Region ==
=== Don Feltis Cup ===
The Don Feltis Cup is a Sydney based men's first grade rugby league competition that features teams from the Penrith district. This competition feeds into the Penrith Panthers New South Wales Cup team.

==== Teams ====
| Colours | Club | NSW Cup Affiliate | Home ground(s) | Head coach |
|---|---|---|---|---|
| | Cambridge Park-Cranebrook Panthers | Penrith Panthers | Allsopp Patterson Oval | TBA |
| | Colyton Colts | Penrith Panthers | Cec Blinkhorn Oval | TBA |
| | Emu Plains Emus | Penrith Panthers | Leonay Oval | TBA |
| | Minchinbury Jets | Penrith Panthers | Federation Forest Oval | TBA |
| | Penrith Brothers (C) | | Parker Street Reserve | TBA |
| | Riverstone Razorbacks | Penrith Panthers | Basil Andrews Playing Fields | TBA |
| | St Clair Comets | Penrith Panthers | Peppertree Sporting Complex | TBA |
| | St Marys Saints (C) | | The Kingsway Oval | TBA |
| | Windsor Wolves | Penrith Panthers | Windsor Sporting Complex | TBA |

==== Ladder ====
| Pos | Team | Pld | W | D | L | B | PF | PA | PD | Pts | Qualification |
|---|---|---|---|---|---|---|---|---|---|---|---|
| 1 | Windsor Wolves | 16 | 14 | 1 | 1 | 2 | 597 | 246 | +351 | 33 | Minor Premiers & Major Semi-Final |
| 2 | Emu Plains Emus | 16 | 11 | 1 | 4 | 2 | 440 | 260 | +170 | 27 | Major Semi-Final |
| 3 | Cambridge Park-Cranebrook Panthers | 16 | 10 | 1 | 5 | 2 | 478 | 285 | +193 | 25 | Elimination Finals |
| 4 | St Marys Saints (C) | 17 | 8 | 2 | 7 | 2 | 464 | 398 | +66 | 22 | Elimination Finals |
| 5 | St Clair Comets | 15 | 9 | 0 | 6 | 2 | 421 | 385 | +38 | 22 | Elimination Finals |
| 6 | Colyton Colts | 16 | 7 | 0 | 9 | 2 | 416 | 464 | –48 | 18 | Elimination Finals |
| 7 | Penrith Brothers (C) | 16 | 6 | 1 | 9 | 2 | 400 | 468 | –68 | 17 | |
| 8 | Minchinbury Jets | 16 | 4 | 0 | 12 | 2 | 386 | 506 | -120 | 12 | |
| 9 | Riverstone Razorbacks | 16 | 0 | 0 | 16 | 2 | 226 | 806 | -580 | 4 | |

Updated to match(es) played on 1 September. Source:
Rules for classification: 1) points; 2) point difference; 3) points scored

==== Ladder progression ====
- Numbers highlighted in green indicate that the team finished the round inside the top 6.
- Numbers highlighted in blue indicates the team finished first on the ladder in that round.
- Numbers highlighted in red indicates the team finished last place on the ladder in that round.
- Underlined numbers indicate that the team had a bye during that round.

| Pos | Team | 1 | 2 | 3 | 4 | 5 | 6 | 7 | 8 | 9 | 10 | 11 | 12 | 13 | 14 | 15 | 16 | 17 | 18 |
|---|---|---|---|---|---|---|---|---|---|---|---|---|---|---|---|---|---|---|---|
| 1 | Windsor Wolves | 2 | 3 | 5 | 7 | 7 | 9 | 11 | 13 | 15 | 17 | 19 | 21 | 23 | 25 | 27 | 29 | 31 | 33 |
| 2 | Emu Plains Emus | 0 | 1 | 3 | 3 | 5 | 7 | 9 | 11 | 13 | 15 | 15 | 17 | 19 | 21 | 21 | 23 | 25 | 27 |
| 3 | Cambridge Park-Cranebrook Panthers | 2 | 4 | 6 | 7 | 9 | 9 | 9 | 11 | 13 | 13 | 15 | 17 | 19 | 21 | 23 | 23 | 23 | 25 |
| 4 | St Marys Saints (C) | 2 | 4 | 6 | 7 | 9 | 9 | 11 | 11 | 13 | 15 | 16 | 18 | 18 | 18 | 20 | 20 | 22 | 22 |
| 5 | St Clair Comets | 2 | 4 | 4 | 6 | 8 | 10 | 12 | 14 | 14 | 16 | 16 | 16 | 18 | 20 | 20 | 22 | 22 | 22 |
| 6 | Colyton Colts | 0 | 0 | 2 | 4 | 6 | 8 | 8 | 10 | 10 | 10 | 12 | 12 | 12 | 12 | 14 | 16 | 18 | 18 |
| 7 | Penrith Brothers (C) | 0 | 0 | 0 | 2 | 2 | 2 | 4 | 4 | 6 | 6 | 7 | 9 | 11 | 11 | 11 | 13 | 15 | 17 |
| 8 | Minchinbury Jets | 2 | 2 | 2 | 2 | 2 | 4 | 4 | 4 | 4 | 6 | 6 | 6 | 6 | 8 | 10 | 10 | 10 | 12 |
| 9 | Riverstone Razorbacks | 0 | 2 | 2 | 2 | 2 | 2 | 2 | 2 | 2 | 2 | 4 | 4 | 4 | 4 | 4 | 4 | 4 | 4 |

Season Results:

| Home | Score | Away | Match Information |
| Home | Score | Away | Date and Time | Venue | Referee | Video |
|---|---|---|---|---|---|---|
Round 1
| Cambridge Park-Cranebrook Panthers | 18 – 16 | Emu Plains Emus | Sunday, 6 April, 2:00pm | Allsopp Patterson Oval | TBA |
| Penrith Brothers (C) | 22 – 24 | St Clair Comets | Sunday, 6 April, 2:10pm | Parker Street Reserve | TBA |
| St Marys Saints (C) | 56 – 14 | Riverstone Razorbacks | Sunday, 6 April, 2:10pm | The Kingsway Oval | TBA |
| Windsor Wolves | 44 – 30 | Colyton Colts | Sunday, 6 April, 2:30pm | Windsor Sporting Complex | TBA |
| Minchinbury Jets | | BYE |
Round 2
| St Marys Saints (C) | 52 – 6 | Penrith Brothers (C) | Saturday, 12 April, 5:00pm | The Kingsway Oval | TBA |
| Cambridge Park-Cranebrook Panthers | 54 – 10 | Minchinbury Jets | Saturday, 12 April, 5:05pm | Allsopp Patterson Oval | TBA |
| Windsor Wolves | 14 – 14 | Emu Plains Emus | Saturday, 12 April, 5:50pm | Windsor Sporting Complex | TBA |
| St Clair Comets | 24 – 12 | Colyton Colts | Saturday, 12 April, 6:30pm | Peppertree Sporting Complex | TBA |
| Riverstone Razorbacks | | BYE |
Round 3 (ANZAC Round)
| Cambridge Park-Cranebrook Panthers | 38 – 12 | Riverstone Razorbacks | Friday, 25 April, 3:00pm | Allsopp Patterson Oval | TBA |
| Emu Plains Emus | 14 – 8 | St Clair Comets | Friday, 25 April, 3:00pm | Leonay Oval | TBA |
| Windsor Wolves | 30 – 12 | Minchinbury Jets | Friday, 25 April, 3:00pm | Windsor Sporting Complex | TBA |
| Colyton Colts | 36 – 10 | Penrith Brothers (C) | Sunday, 27 April, 2:00pm | Cec Blinkhorn Oval | TBA |
| St Marys Saints (C) | | BYE |
Round 4
| St Clair Comets | 44 – 16 | Minchinbury Jets | Sunday, 4 May, 2:00pm | Peppertree Sporting Complex | TBA |
| Windsor Wolves | 70 – 10 | Riverstone Razorbacks | Sunday, 4 May, 2:00pm | Windsor Sporting Complex | TBA |
| Emu Plains Emus | 22 – 24 | Colyton Colts | Sunday, 4 May, 2:40pm | Leonay Oval | TBA |
| Cambridge Park-Cranebrook Panthers | 18 – 18 | St Marys Saints (C) | Sunday, 4 May, 3:10pm | Allsopp Patterson Oval | TBA |
| Penrith Brothers (C) | | BYE |
Round 5
| Emu Plains Emus | 28 – 24 | Penrith Brothers (C) | Saturday, 10 May, 5:20pm | Leonay Oval | TBA |
| Riverstone Razorbacks | 10 – 34 | St Clair Comets | Saturday, 10 May, 5:40pm | Basil Andrews Playing Fields | TBA |
| St Marys Saints (C) | 20 – 18 | Windsor Wolves | Saturday, 10 May, 5:50pm | The Kingsway Oval | TBA |
| Colyton Colts | 48 – 4 | Minchinbury Jets | Saturday, 10 May, 6:10pm | Cec Blinkhorn Oval | TBA |
| Cambridge Park-Cranebrook Panthers | | BYE |
Round 6
| Penrith Brothers (C) | 6 – 34 | Windsor Wolves | Saturday, 17 May, 6:00pm | Parker Street Reserve | TBA |
| Minchinbury Jets | 36 – 30 | Riverstone Razorbacks | Sunday, 18 May, 2:00pm | Federation Forest Oval | TBA |
| St Clair Comets | 23 – 22 | Cambridge Park-Cranebrook Panthers | Sunday, 18 May, 3:10pm | Peppertree Sporting Complex | TBA |
| St Marys Saints (C) | 6 – 16 | Emu Plains Emus | Sunday, 18 May, 3:20pm | The Kingsway Oval | TBA |
| Colyton Colts | | BYE |
Round 7
| Colyton Colts | 32 – 36 | St Marys Saints (C) | Saturday, 24 May, 3:00pm | Londonderry Oval | TBA |
| Cambridge Park-Cranebrook Panthers | 14 – 36 | Windsor Wolves | Saturday, 24 May, 3:00pm | The Ponds Stadium | TBA |
| Emu Plains Emus | 66 – 6 | Riverstone Razorbacks | Saturday, 24 May, 4:30pm | The Ponds Stadium | TBA |
| Penrith Brothers (C) | 22 – 14 | Minchinbury Jets | Saturday, 24 May, 4:30pm | Londonderry Oval | TBA |
| St Clair Comets | | BYE |
Round 8
| Colyton Colts | 46 – 18 | Riverstone Razorbacks | Saturday, 31 May, 6:10pm | Cec Blinkhorn Oval | TBA |
| Penrith Brothers (C) | 32 – 42 | Cambridge Park-Cranebrook Panthers | Saturday, 31 May, 7:00pm | Parker Street Reserve | TBA |
| Emu Plains Emus | 38 – 32 | Minchinbury Jets | Sunday, 1 June, 2:40pm | Leonay Oval | TBA |
| St Clair Comets | 28 – 22 | St Marys Saints (C) | Sunday, 1 June, 3:20pm | Peppertree Sporting Complex | TBA |
| Windsor Wolves | | BYE |
Round 9
| Cambridge Park-Cranebrook Panthers | 36 – 6 | Colyton Colts | Saturday, 14 June, 3:10pm | Allsopp Patterson Oval | TBA |
| St Marys Saints (C) | 42 – 14 | Minchinbury Jets | Saturday, 14 June, 3:45pm | The Kingsway Oval | TBA |
| Windsor Wolves | 30 – 22 | St Clair Comets | Saturday, 14 June, 4:55pm | Windsor Sporting Complex | TBA |
| Riverstone Razorbacks | 12 – 60 | Penrith Brothers (C) | Saturday, 14 June, 5:40pm | Basil Andrews Playing Fields | TBA |
| Emu Plains Emus | | BYE |
Round 10
| Colyton Colts | 10 – 48 | Windsor Wolves | Sunday, 22 June, 2:30pm | Cec Blinkhorn Oval | TBA |
| Emu Plains Emus | 20 – 18 | Cambridge Park-Cranebrook Panthers | Sunday, 22 June, 2:40pm | Leonay Oval | TBA |
| St Clair Comets | 46 – 24 | Penrith Brothers (C) | Sunday, 22 June, 2:40pm | Peppertree Sporting Complex | TBA |
| Riverstone Razorbacks | 20 – 48 | St Marys Saints (C) | Sunday, 22 June, 3:40pm | Basil Andrews Playing Fields | TBA |
| Minchinbury Jets | | BYE |
Round 11
| Penrith Brothers (C) | 32 – 32 | St Marys Saints (C) | Saturday, 28 June, 1:30pm | Parker Street Reserve | TBA |
| Colyton Colts | 34 – 18 | St Clair Comets | Saturday, 28 June, 5:10pm | Cec Blinkhorn Oval | TBA |
| Minchinbury Jets | 16 – 32 | Cambridge Park-Cranebrook Panthers | Saturday, 28 June, 6:15pm | Federation Forest Oval | TBA |
| Emu Plains Emus | 16 – 30 | Windsor Wolves | Saturday, 28 June, 6:25pm | Leonay Oval | TBA |
| Riverstone Razorbacks | | BYE |
Round 12
| Penrith Brothers (C) | 36 – 6 | Colyton Colts | Saturday, 5 July, 5:45pm | Parker Street Reserve | TBA |
| Riverstone Razorbacks | 22 – 36 | Cambridge Park-Cranebrook Panthers | Sunday, 6 July, 2:00pm | Basil Andrews Playing Fields | TBA |
| Minchinbury Jets | 32 – 40 | Windsor Wolves | Sunday, 6 July, 2:00pm | Federation Forest Oval | TBA |
| St Clair Comets | 6 – 18 | Emu Plains Emus | Sunday, 6 July, 2:40pm | Peppertree Sporting Complex | TBA |
| St Marys Saints (C) | | BYE |
Round 13 (Magic Round)
| Riverstone Razorbacks | 0 – 60 | Windsor Wolves | Saturday, 12 July, 2:00pm | Leonay Oval | TBA |
| St Marys Saints (C) | 18 – 40 | Cambridge Park-Cranebrook Panthers | Saturday, 12 July, 3:00pm | Leonay Oval | TBA |
| Minchinbury Jets | 32 – 34 | St Clair Comets | Saturday, 12 July, 6:00pm | Leonay Oval | TBA |
| Emu Plains Emus | 28 – 20 | Colyton Colts | Saturday, 12 July, 7:00pm | Leonay Oval | TBA |
| Penrith Brothers (C) | | BYE |
Round 14
| Penrith Brothers (C) | 22 – 42 | Emu Plains Emus | Saturday, 19 July, 4:50pm | Parker Street Reserve | TBA |
| St Clair Comets | 44 – 28 | Riverstone Razorbacks | Saturday, 19 July, 5:00pm | Peppertree Sporting Complex | TBA |
| Minchinbury Jets | 34 – 28 | Colyton Colts | Saturday, 19 July, 5:50pm | Federation Forest Oval | TBA |
| Windsor Wolves | 36 – 12 | St Marys Saints (C) | Saturday, 19 July, 5:50pm | Windsor Sporting Complex | TBA |
| Cambridge Park-Cranebrook Panthers | | BYE |
Round 15
| Emu Plains Emus | 20 – 22 | St Marys Saints (C) | Saturday, 26 July, 6:00pm | Leonay Oval | TBA |
| Windsor Wolves | 52 – 12 | Penrith Brothers (C) | Sunday, 27 July, 3:00pm | Windsor Sporting Complex | TBA |
| Cambridge Park-Cranebrook Panthers | 20 – 14 | St Clair Comets | Sunday, 27 July, 3:10pm | Allsopp Patterson Oval | TBA |
| Riverstone Razorbacks | 6 – 58 | Minchinbury Jets | Sunday, 27 July, 3:10pm | Basil Andrews Playing Fields | TBA |
| Colyton Colts | | BYE |
Round 16
| St Marys Saints (C) | 24 – 34 | Colyton Colts | Friday, 1 August, 7:40pm | The Kingsway Oval | TBA |
| Windsor Wolves | 18 – 12 | Cambridge Park-Cranebrook Panthers | Friday, 1 August, 8:00pm | Windsor Sporting Complex | TBA |
| Riverstone Razorbacks | 0 – 60 | Emu Plains Emus | Friday, 1 August, 8:00pm | Basil Andrews Playing Fields | TBA |
| Minchinbury Jets | 14 – 24 | Penrith Brothers (C) | Friday, 1 August, 8:00pm | Federation Forest Oval | TBA |
| St Clair Comets | | BYE |
Round 17
| Minchinbury Jets | 20 – 22 | Emu Plains Emus | Sunday, 10 August, 12:10pm | Federation Forest Oval | TBA |
| Cambridge Park-Cranebrook Panthers | 14 – 20 | Penrith Brothers (C) | Sunday, 10 August, 2:00pm | Allsopp Patterson Oval | TBA |
| Riverstone Razorbacks | 18 – 46 | Colyton Colts | Sunday, 10 August, 2:00pm | Basil Andrews Playing Fields | TBA |
| St Marys Saints (C) | 44 – 28 | St Clair Comets | Sunday, 10 August, 2:30pm | St Marys Leagues Stadium | TBA |
| Windsor Wolves | | BYE |
Round 18
| Windsor Wolves | 37 – 24 | St Clair Comets | Sunday, 17 August, 12:00pm | Federation Forest Oval | TBA |
| Minchinbury Jets | 42 – 12 | St Marys Saints (C) | Sunday, 17 August, 2:00pm | Federation Forest Oval | TBA |
| Riverstone Razorbacks | 20 – 48 | Penrith Brothers (C) | Sunday, 17 August, 2:00pm | Basil Andrews Playing Fields | TBA |
| Colyton Colts | 4 – 64 | Cambridge Park-Cranebrook Panthers | Sunday, 17 August, 2:00pm | Cec Blinkhorn Oval | TBA |
| Emu Plains Emus | | BYE |
Finals Series
Elimination Finals
| Cambridge Park-Cranebrook Panthers | 20 – 27 | Colyton Colts | Sunday, 24 August, 2:00pm | St Marys Leagues Stadium | TBA |
| St Clair Comets | 22 – 18 | St Marys Saints (C) | Sunday, 24 August, 3:40pm | St Marys Leagues Stadium | TBA |
Major & Minor Semi-Finals
| St Clair Comets | 40 – 16 | Colyton Colts | Sunday, 31 August, 1:40pm | Parker Street Reserve | TBA |
| Windsor Wolves | 38 – 8 | Emu Plains Emus | Sunday, 31 August, 3:10pm | Parker Street Reserve | TBA |
Preliminary Final
| Emu Plains Emus | 28 – 32 | St Clair Comets | Sunday, 7 September, 3:00pm | Parker Street Reserve | TBA |
Grand Final
| Windsor Wolves | V | St Clair Comets | Sunday, 14 September, 3:00pm | Windsor Sporting Complex | TBA |

==== Grand Final ====
Elimination Finals
3 | Cambridge Park-Cranebrook | 20
6 | Colyton | 27
4 | St Clair | 22
5 | St Marys | 18

Semi-Finals
1 | Windsor | 38
2 | Emu Plains | 8
4 | St Clair | 40
6 | Colyton | 16

Preliminary Final
2 | Emu Plains | 28
4 | St Clair | 32

Grand Final
1 | Windsor
4 | St Clair

2025 Don Feltis Cup Grand Final

3:00pm
Sunday, 14 September 2025

| Windsor Wolves | v | St Clair Comets |

Windsor Sporting Complex, Sydney

== Victoria ==
=== Storm Premiership ===
The Storm First Grade Premiership is a Melbourne based men's first grade rugby league competition that features teams from the Victorian Metro district. Despite being based in Victoria, this competition feeds into the Melbourne Storm feeder team, the North Sydney Bears.

==== Teams ====
There are multiple changes to the 2025 lineup of teams

- Werribee Bears drop into second grade for 2025.
- Both Northern Thunder and Waverley Panthers move into first grade for 2025.
- Melbourne Storm are fielding a team in the competition under their own banner.

| Colours | Club | NSW Cup Affiliate | Home ground(s) | Head coach |
|---|---|---|---|---|
| | Altona Roosters | North Sydney Bears | Bruce Comben Reserve | TBA |
| | Casey Warriors | North Sydney Bears | Casey Fields | TBA |
| | Melbourne Thunderbolts | North Sydney Bears | Seabrook Reserve | TBA |
| | Northern Thunder | North Sydney Bears | Seabrook Reserve | TBA |
| | Sunbury Tigers | North Sydney Bears | Langama Park | TBA |
| | Sunshine Cowboys | North Sydney Bears | Arthur Beachley Reserve | TBA |
| | Truganina Rabbitohs | North Sydney Bears | Clearwood Drive Reserve | TBA |

| State Map | Melbourne Map |
|---|---|
| Home Venues | Home Venues |

==== Ladder ====
| Pos | Team | Pld | W | D | L | B | PF | PA | PD | Pts | Qualification |
|---|---|---|---|---|---|---|---|---|---|---|---|
| 1 | Northern Thunder | 14 | 12 | 0 | 2 | 3 | 397 | 210 | +187 | 30 | Minor Premiers & Major Semi-Final |
| 2 | Melbourne Thunderbolts | 14 | 11 | 0 | 3 | 3 | 589 | 213 | +378 | 28 | |
| 3 | Truganina Rabbitohs | 14 | 8 | 0 | 6 | 3 | 278 | 341 | –73 | 22 | Major Semi-Final |
| 4 | Casey Warriors | 14 | 7 | 0 | 7 | 3 | 371 | 368 | +3 | 20 | Minor Semi-Final |
| 5 | Sunbury Tigers | 14 | 6 | 0 | 8 | 3 | 374 | 437 | –63 | 18 | Minor Semi-Final |
| 6 | Altona Roosters | 14 | 3 | 0 | 11 | 3 | 218 | 376 | -158 | 12 | |
| 7 | Sunshine Cowboys | 14 | 2 | 0 | 12 | 3 | 246 | 528 | -282 | 10 | |

Updated to match(es) played on 1 September. Source:
Rules for classification: 1) points; 2) point difference; 3) points scored

==== Ladder progression ====
- Numbers highlighted in green indicate that the team finished the round inside the top 4.
- Numbers highlighted in blue indicates the team finished first on the ladder in that round.
- Numbers highlighted in red indicates the team finished last place on the ladder in that round.
- Underlined numbers indicate that the team had a bye during that round.

| Pos | Team | 1 | 2 | 3 | 4 | 5 | 6 | 7 | 8 | 9 | 10 | 11 | 12 | 13 | 14 | 15 | 16 | 17 |
|---|---|---|---|---|---|---|---|---|---|---|---|---|---|---|---|---|---|---|
| 1 | Northern Thunder | 2 | 4 | 6 | 8 | 10 | 12 | 14 | 16 | 16 | 18 | 20 | 22 | 24 | 26 | 28 | 28 | 30 |
| 2* | Melbourne Thunderbolts | 0 | 0 | 2 | 4 | 6 | 8 | 10 | 12 | 14 | 16 | 18 | 20 | 20 | 22 | 24 | 26 | 28 |
| 3 | Truganina Rabbitohs | 2 | 4 | 6 | 6 | 8 | 8 | 8 | 10 | 12 | 14 | 14 | 14 | 16 | 18 | 20 | 20 | 22 |
| 4 | Casey Warriors | 2 | 4 | 6 | 6 | 6 | 6 | 8 | 8 | 10 | 12 | 12 | 14 | 14 | 16 | 16 | 18 | 20 |
| 5 | Sunbury Tigers | 2 | 2 | 2 | 4 | 4 | 6 | 6 | 6 | 6 | 8 | 10 | 12 | 14 | 14 | 16 | 18 | 18 |
| 6 | Altona Roosters | 0 | 2 | 2 | 2 | 4 | 6 | 6 | 6 | 8 | 8 | 8 | 8 | 10 | 10 | 10 | 12 | 12 |
| 7 | Sunshine Cowboys | 0 | 0 | 0 | 2 | 2 | 2 | 4 | 6 | 6 | 6 | 8 | 8 | 8 | 8 | 8 | 8 | 10 |

- The Melbourne Thunderbolts team were declared ineligible for finals.

Season Results:

| Home | Score | Away | Match Information |
| Home | Score | Away | Date and Time | Venue | Referee | Video |
|---|---|---|---|---|---|---|
Round 1 (Multicultural Round)
| Sunshine Cowboys | 30 – 70 | Sunbury Tigers | Saturday, 12 April, 2:50pm | Bruce Comben Reserve | Johnathan Nicholls |
| Altona Roosters | 18 – 26 | Northern Thunder | Saturday, 12 April, 4:05pm | Bruce Comben Reserve | Matt Hicks |
| Casey Warriors | 27 – 26 | Melbourne Thunderbolts | Saturday, 12 April, 4:30pm | Casey Fields | William Roache |
| Truganina Rabbitohs | | BYE |
Round 2 (ANZAC Round)
| Casey Warriors | 48 – 14 | Sunshine Cowboys | Saturday, 26 April, 2:00pm | Comely Banks Recreation Reserve | David Michalow |
| Sunbury Tigers | 12 – 26 | Truganina Rabbitohs | Saturday, 26 April, 4:00pm | Seabrook Reserve | Matt Hicks |
| Northern Thunder | 26 – 12 | Melbourne Thunderbolts | Saturday, 26 April, 5:30pm | Seabrook Reserve | Johnathan Nicholls |
| Altona Roosters | | BYE |
Round 3
| Truganina Rabbitohs | 28 – 12 | Altona Roosters | Friday, 2 May, 6:30pm | Clearwood Drive Reserve | Johnathan Nicholls |
| Sunshine Cowboys | 26 – 62 | Melbourne Thunderbolts | Saturday, 3 May, 3:00pm | Arthur Beachley Reserve | Roger Reeves |
| Sunbury Tigers | 0 – 52 | Northern Thunder | Saturday, 3 May, 3:00pm | Langama Park | TBA |
| Casey Warriors | | BYE |
Round 4
| Altona Roosters | 14 – 36 | Melbourne Thunderbolts | Saturday, 10 May, 5:40pm | Bruce Comben Reserve | Matt Hicks |
| Northern Thunder | 40 – 12 | Truganina Rabbitohs | Saturday, 10 May, 6:15pm | Seabrook Reserve | Johnathan Nicholls |
| Casey Warriors | 28 – 30 | Sunbury Tigers | Saturday, 10 May, 6:40pm | Casey Fields | David Michalow |
| Sunshine Cowboys | | BYE |
Round 5 (Respect Round)
| Truganina Rabbitohs | 28 – 24 | Casey Warriors | Friday 16 May, 6:30pm | Clearwood Drive Reserve | Roger Reeves |
| Altona Roosters | 22 – 16 | Sunbury Tigers | Saturday, 17 May, 3:00pm | Bruce Comben Reserve | Johnathan Nicholls |
| Sunshine Cowboys | 0 – 0* | Northern Thunder | N/A |
| Melbourne Thunderbolts | | BYE |
Round 6
| Altona Roosters | 32 – 12 | Sunshine Cowboys | Saturday, 24 May, 3:00pm | Haines Drive Reserve | Matt Hicks |
| Casey Warriors | 10 – 36 | Northern Thunder | Saturday, 24 May, 3:20pm | Casey Fields | TBA |
| Truganina Rabbitohs | 4 – 72 | Melbourne Thunderbolts | Saturday, 24 May, 3:50pm | Clearwood Drive Reserve | Johnathan Nicholls |
| Sunbury Tigers | | BYE |
Round 7
| Truganina Rabbitohs | 16 – 32 | Sunshine Cowboys | Saturday, 31 May, 3:00pm | Langama Park | William Roache |
| Sunbury Tigers | 18 – 56 | Melbourne Thunderbolts | Saturday, 31 May, 5:30pm | Langama Park | Matt Hicks |
| Altona Roosters | 20 – 26 | Casey Warriors | Saturday, 31 May, 5:30pm | Bruce Comben Reserve | Johnathan Nicholls |
| Northern Thunder | | BYE |
Round 8
| Melbourne Thunderbolts | 52 – 18 | Casey Warriors | Sunday, 14 June, 1:30pm | Seabrook Reserve | Blake Ridge |
| Sunshine Cowboys | 44 – 16 | Sunbury Tigers | Sunday, 14 June, 4:20pm | Arthur Beachley Reserve | Johnathan Nicholls |
| Northern Thunder | 36 – 12 | Altona Roosters | Sunday, 14 June, 5:25pm | Seabrook Reserve | Matt Hicks |
| Truganina Rabbitohs | | BYE |
Round 9
| Truganina Rabbitohs | 24 – 16 | Sunbury Tigers | Saturday, 21 June, 3:00pm | Clearwood Drive Reserve | TBA |
| Melbourne Thunderbolts | 42 – 22 | Northern Thunder | Saturday, 21 June, 3:30pm | Seabrook Reserve | David Michalow |
| Sunshine Cowboys | 10 – 52 | Casey Warriors | Saturday, 21 June, 4:30pm | Arthur Beachley Reserve | Blake Ridge |
| Altona Roosters | | BYE |
Round 10
| Melbourne Thunderbolts | 58 – 6 | Sunshine Cowboys | Saturday, 28 June, 3:00pm | Seabrook Reserve | Matt Hicks |
| Altona Roosters | 12 – 32 | Truganina Rabbitohs | Saturday, 28 June, 3:00pm | Bruce Comben Reserve | Johnathan Nicholls |
| Casey Warriors | BYE | Sunbury Tigers |
| Northern Thunder | BYE |
Round 11 (Respect Round)
| Melbourne Thunderbolts | 74 – 4 | Altona Roosters | Friday, 4 July, 6:30pm | Seabrook Reserve | Matt Hicks |
| Truganina Rabbitohs | 18 – 41 | Northern Thunder | Saturday, 5 July, 3:00pm | Clearwood Drive Reserve | David Michalow |
| Sunbury Tigers | 38 – 36 | Casey Warriors | Saturday, 5 July, 3:00pm | Langama Park | Johnathan Nicholls |
| Sunshine Cowboys | | BYE |
Round 12
| Northern Thunder | 40 – 16 | Sunshine Cowboys | Saturday, 19 July, 5:10pm | Comely Banks Recreation Reserve | William Roache |
| Sunbury Tigers | 36 – 6 | Altona Roosters | Saturday, 19 July, 5:25pm | Haines Drive Reserve | Roger Reeves |
| Casey Warriors | 22 – 18 | Truganina Rabbitohs | Monday, 21 July, 5:40pm | Casey Fields | Blake Ridge |
| Melbourne Thunderbolts | | BYE |
Round 13
| Sunshine Cowboys | 14 – 44 | Altona Roosters | Saturday, 26 July, 6:05pm | Bruce Comben Reserve | TBA |
| Northern Thunder | 30 – 24 | Casey Warriors | Saturday, 26 July, 6:20pm | Seabrook Reserve | TBA |
| Melbourne Thunderbolts | 0 – 0* | Truganina Rabbitohs | N/A |
| Sunbury Tigers | | BYE |
Round 14
| Truganina Rabbitohs | 42 – 24 | Sunshine Cowboys | Friday, 1 August, 8:10pm | Clearwood Drive Reserve | TBA |
| Casey Warriors | 40 – 22 | Altona Roosters | Saturday, 2 August, 2:55pm | Comely Banks Recreation Reserve | TBA |
| Sunbury Tigers | 20 – 29 | Melbourne Thunderbolts | Saturday, 2 August, 4:00pm | Langama Park | TBA |
| Northern Thunder | | BYE |
Round 15 (Community Round)
| Casey Warriors | 16 – 44 | Melbourne Thunderbolts | Saturday, 9 August, 3:25pm | Casey Fields | TBA |
| Sunbury Tigers | 48 – 18 | Sunshine Cowboys | Saturday, 9 August, 5:50pm | Langama Park | TBA |
| Northern Thunder | 0* – 0 | Altona Roosters | N/A |
| Truganina Rabbitohs | | BYE |
Round 16
| Truganina Rabbitohs | 30 – 34 | Sunbury Tigers | Saturday, 16 August, 2:55pm | Clearwood Drive Reserve | TBA |
| Northern Thunder | 12 – 26 | Melbourne Thunderbolts | Saturday, 16 August, 4:15pm | Seabrook Reserve | TBA |
| Casey Warriors | 0* – 0 | Sunshine Cowboys | N/A |
| Altona Roosters | | BYE |
Round 17
| Northern Thunder | 36 – 20 | Sunbury Tigers | Saturday, 23 August, 6:00pm | Comely Banks Recreation Reserve | TBA |
| Truganina Rabbitohs | 0* – 0 | Altona Roosters | N/A |
| Casey Warriors | BYE | Sunshine Cowboys |
| Melbourne Thunderbolts | BYE |
Finals Series
Major & Minor Semi-Finals
| Casey Warriors | 38 – 20 | Sunbury Tigers | Saturday, 30 August, 5:35pm | Langama Park | Matt Hicks |
| Northern Thunder | 22 – 20 | Truganina Rabbitohs | Saturday, 30 August, 5:45pm | Bruce Comben Reserve | William Roache |
Preliminary Final
| Truganina Rabbitohs | 24 – 20 | Casey Warriors | Saturday, 6 September, 7:45pm | Haines Drive Reserve | TBA |
Grand Final
| Northern Thunder | V | Truganina Rabbitohs | Saturday, 13 September, 5:40pm | Seabrook Reserve | TBA |

==== Grand Final ====
Semi-Finals
1 | Northern | 22
2 | Truganina | 20
3 | Casey | 38
4 | Sunbury | 20

Preliminary Final
2 | Truganina | 24
3 | Casey | 20

Grand Final
1 | Northern
2 | Truganina

2025 Storm First Grade Premiership Grand Final

Saturday, 13 September 2025
5:40pm

| Northern Thunder | v | Truganina Rabbitohs |

Seabrook Reserve, Melbourne

== New Zealand ==
=== Auckland Premiership ===
The Auckland First Grade Premiership (Named the Fox Memorial Premiership) is a Auckland based men's first grade rugby league competition that features teams from the Auckland district. This competition is the top club competition in New Zealand and feeds into the New Zealand Warriors New South Wales Cup team.

==== Teams ====
The premiership will feature 10 teams, 4 of which automatically qualify (Papakura, Point Chevalier, Richmond and Te Atatu). 12 teams will play in a qualifying tournament featuring 3 groups of 4. The top 2 teams from each qualifying group will take up the remaining 6 spots in the 2025 premiership.

The format and finals series for the 2025 premiership is TBA.

| Colours | Club | NSW Cup Affiliate | Home ground(s) | Head coach |
Premiership Teams
| | Bay Roskill Vikings | New Zealand Warriors | Blockhouse Bay Reserve | TBA |
| | Manukau Magpies | New Zealand Warriors | Moyle Park | TBA |
| | Marist Saints | New Zealand Warriors | Murray Halberg Park | TBA |
| | Mount Albert Lions | New Zealand Warriors | Fowlds Park | TBA |
| | Otahuhu Leopards | New Zealand Warriors | Bert Henham Park | TBA |
| | Papakura Sea Eagles | New Zealand Warriors | Prince Edward Park | TBA |
| | Point Chevalier Pirates | New Zealand Warriors | Walker Park | TBA |
| | Ponsonby United Ponies | New Zealand Warriors | Victoria Park | TBA |
| | Richmond Rovers | New Zealand Warriors | Grey Lynn Park | TBA |
| | Te Atatu Roosters | New Zealand Warriors | Jack Colvin Park | TBA |
Failed Qualifiers
| | Glenora Bears | New Zealand Warriors | Harold Moody Reserve | TBA |
| | Hibiscus Coast Raiders | New Zealand Warriors | Stanmore Bay Oval | TBA |
| | Howick Hornets | New Zealand Warriors | Paparoa Park | TBA |
| | Manurewa Marlins | New Zealand Warriors | Mountfort Park | TBA |
| | Northcote Tigers | New Zealand Warriors | Birkenhead War Memorial Oval | TBA |
| | Otara Scorpions | New Zealand Warriors | Ngati Otara Park | TBA |

| State Map | Auckland Map |
|---|---|
| Home Venues | Home Venues |

==== Qualifying Ladder ====
Pool A

| Pos | Team | Pld | W | D | L | B | PF | PA | PD | Pts | Qualification |
|---|---|---|---|---|---|---|---|---|---|---|---|
| 1 | Otahuhu Leopards | 3 | 3 | 0 | 0 | 0 | 272 | 10 | +262 | 6 | Premiership Competition |
| 2 | Marist Saints | 3 | 2 | 0 | 1 | 0 | 132 | 92 | +40 | 4 | Premiership Competition |
| 3 | Manurewa Marlins | 3 | 1 | 0 | 2 | 0 | 50 | 174 | -124 | 2 | |
| 4 | Glenora Bears | 3 | 0 | 0 | 3 | 0 | 38 | 216 | -178 | 0 | |

Updated to match(es) played on 1 September. Source:
Rules for classification: 1) points; 2) point difference; 3) points scored

Pool B

| Pos | Team | Pld | W | D | L | B | PF | PA | PD | Pts | Qualification |
|---|---|---|---|---|---|---|---|---|---|---|---|
| 1 | Mount Albert Lions | 3 | 3 | 0 | 0 | 0 | 122 | 28 | +94 | 6 | Premiership Competition |
| 2 | Bay Roskill Vikings | 3 | 2 | 0 | 1 | 0 | 80 | 84 | –4 | 4 | Premiership Competition |
| 3 | Otara Scorpions | 3 | 0 | 1 | 2 | 0 | 58 | 90 | –32 | 1 | |
| 4 | Hibiscus Coast Raiders | 3 | 0 | 1 | 2 | 0 | 46 | 104 | –58 | 1 | |

Updated to match(es) played on 1 September. Source:
Rules for classification: 1) points; 2) point difference; 3) points scored

Pool C

| Pos | Team | Pld | W | D | L | B | PF | PA | PD | Pts | Qualification |
|---|---|---|---|---|---|---|---|---|---|---|---|
| 1 | Manukau Magpies | 3 | 3 | 0 | 0 | 0 | 94 | 40 | +54 | 6 | Premiership Competition |
| 2 | Ponsonby United Ponies | 3 | 2 | 0 | 1 | 0 | 70 | 60 | +10 | 4 | Premiership Competition |
| 3 | Howick Hornets | 3 | 1 | 0 | 2 | 0 | 64 | 92 | –28 | 2 | |
| 4 | Northcote Tigers | 3 | 0 | 0 | 3 | 0 | 56 | 92 | –36 | 0 | |

Updated to match(es) played on 1 September. Source:
Rules for classification: 1) points; 2) point difference; 3) points scored

==== Ladder progression ====
- Numbers highlighted in green indicate that the team finished the round inside the top 2.

| Pos | Team | 1 | 2 | 3 |
Pool A
| 1 | Otahuhu Leopards | 2 | 4 | 6 |
| 2 | Marist Saints | 2 | 4 | 4 |
| 3 | Manurewa Marlins | 0 | 0 | 2 |
| 4 | Glenora Bears | 0 | 0 | 0 |
Pool B
| 1 | Mount Albert Lions | 2 | 4 | 6 |
| 2 | Bay Roskill Vikings | 2 | 2 | 4 |
| 3 | Otara Scorpions | 0 | 1 | 1 |
| 4 | Hibiscus Coast Raiders | 0 | 1 | 1 |
Pool C
| 1 | Manukau Magpies | 2 | 4 | 6 |
| 2 | Ponsonby United Ponies | 0 | 2 | 4 |
| 3 | Howick Hornets | 2 | 2 | 2 |
| 4 | Northcote Tigers | 0 | 0 | 0 |

==== Premiership Ladder ====
| Pos | Team | Pld | W | D | L | B | PF | PA | PD | Pts | Qualification |
|---|---|---|---|---|---|---|---|---|---|---|---|
| 1 | Otahuhu Leopards | 12 | 12 | 0 | 0 | 0 | 522 | 88 | +434 | 24 | Minor Premiers & Semi-Finals |
| 2 | Mount Albert Lions | 12 | 9 | 0 | 3 | 0 | 320 | 171 | +149 | 18 | Semi-Finals |
| 3 | Manukau Magpies | 12 | 8 | 1 | 3 | 0 | 289 | 202 | +87 | 17 | Elimination Finals |
| 4 | Papakura Sea Eagles | 12 | 8 | 0 | 4 | 0 | 318 | 277 | +41 | 16 | Elimination Finals |
| 5 | Richmond Rovers | 12 | 6 | 0 | 6 | 0 | 312 | 312 | +0 | 12 | Elimination Finals |
| 6 | Bay Roskill Vikings | 12 | 6 | 0 | 6 | 0 | 288 | 316 | -28 | 12 | Elimination Finals |
| 7 | Point Chevalier Pirates | 12 | 5 | 1 | 6 | 0 | 354 | 302 | +52 | 11 | |
| 8 | Marist Saints | 12 | 3 | 0 | 9 | 0 | 214 | 374 | -160 | 6 | |
| 9 | Te Atatu Roosters | 12 | 1 | 0 | 11 | 0 | 207 | 454 | -247 | 2 | |
| 10 | Ponsonby United Ponies | 12 | 1 | 0 | 11 | 0 | 182 | 510 | -328 | 2 | |

Updated to match(es) played on 1 September. Source:
Rules for classification: 1) points; 2) point difference; 3) points scored

==== Ladder progression ====
- Numbers highlighted in green indicate that the team finished the round inside the top 6.
- Numbers highlighted in blue indicates the team finished first on the ladder in that round.
- Numbers highlighted in red indicates the team finished last place on the ladder in that round.
- Underlined numbers indicate that the team had a bye during that round.

| Pos | Team | 1 | 2 | 3 | 4 | 5 | 6 | 7 | 8 | 9 | 10 | 11 | 12 |
|---|---|---|---|---|---|---|---|---|---|---|---|---|---|
| 1 | Otahuhu Leopards | 2 | 4 | 6 | 8 | 10 | 12 | 14 | 16 | 18 | 20 | 22 | 24 |
| 2 | Mount Albert Lions | 2 | 2 | 4 | 6 | 8 | 10 | 10 | 12 | 14 | 16 | 18 | 18 |
| 3 | Manukau Magpies | 0 | 0 | 2 | 4 | 4 | 6 | 8 | 10 | 12 | 14 | 16 | 17 |
| 4 | Papakura Sea Eagles | 2 | 4 | 4 | 6 | 8 | 10 | 12 | 12 | 14 | 14 | 14 | 16 |
| 5 | Richmond Rovers | 0 | 2 | 4 | 4 | 4 | 4 | 6 | 6 | 8 | 8 | 10 | 12 |
| 6 | Bay Roskill Vikings | 0 | 2 | 2 | 2 | 2 | 2 | 4 | 6 | 6 | 8 | 10 | 12 |
| 7 | Point Chevalier Pirates | 0 | 0 | 2 | 4 | 6 | 6 | 6 | 8 | 8 | 10 | 10 | 11 |
| 8 | Marist Saints | 2 | 2 | 2 | 2 | 4 | 6 | 6 | 6 | 6 | 6 | 6 | 6 |
| 9 | Te Atatu Roosters | 0 | 2 | 2 | 2 | 2 | 2 | 2 | 2 | 2 | 2 | 2 | 2 |
| 10 | Ponsonby United Ponies | 2 | 2 | 2 | 2 | 2 | 2 | 2 | 2 | 2 | 2 | 2 | 2 |

Season Results:

| Home | Score | Away | Match Information |
| Home | Score | Away | Date and Time | Venue | Referee | Video |
|---|---|---|---|---|---|---|
Qualifying Round 1
| Otahuhu Leopards | 110 – 0 | Glenora Bears | Saturday, 5 April, 2:30pm | Bert Henham Park | TBA |
| Marist Saints | 56 – 10 | Manurewa Marlins | Saturday, 5 April, 2:30pm | Murray Halberg Park | TBA |
| Hibiscus Coast Raiders | 6 – 42 | Mount Albert Lions | Saturday, 5 April, 2:30pm | Stanmore Bay Oval | TBA |
| Bay Roskill Vikings | 34 – 20 | Otara Scorpions | Saturday, 5 April, 2:30pm | Blockhouse Bay Reserve | TBA |
| Manukau Magpies | 32 – 8 | Ponsonby United Ponies | Saturday, 5 April, 2:30pm | Moyle Park | TBA |
| Howick Hornets | 32 – 38 | Northcote Tigers | Saturday, 5 April, 2:30pm | Paparoa Park | TBA |
Qualifying Round 2
| Manurewa Marlins | 0 – 92 | Otahuhu Leopards | Saturday, 12 April, 2:30pm | Mountfort Park | TBA |
| Marist Saints | 66 – 12 | Glenora Bears | Saturday, 12 April, 2:30pm | Murray Halberg Park | TBA |
| Otara Scorpions | 22 – 22 | Hibiscus Coast Raiders | Saturday, 12 April, 2:30pm | Ngati Otara Park | TBA |
| Mount Albert Lions | 46 – 6 | Bay Roskill Vikings | Saturday, 12 April, 2:30pm | Fowlds Park | TBA |
| Northcote Tigers | 16 – 28 | Manukau Magpies | Saturday, 12 April, 2:30pm | Birkenhead War Memorial Oval | TBA |
| Howick Hornets | 16 – 30 | Ponsonby United Ponies | Saturday, 12 April, 2:30pm | Paparoa Park | TBA |
Qualifying Round 3
| Glenora Bears | 26 – 40 | Manurewa Marlins | Saturday, 26 April, 2:30pm | Harold Moody Reserve | TBA |
| Otahuhu Leopards | 70 – 10 | Marist Saints | Saturday, 26 April, 2:30pm | Bert Henham Park | TBA |
| Mount Albert Lions | 34 – 16 | Otara Scorpions | Saturday, 26 April, 2:30pm | Fowlds Park | TBA |
| Bay Roskill Vikings | 40 – 18 | Hibiscus Coast Raiders | Saturday, 26 April, 2:30pm | Blockhouse Bay Reserve | TBA |
| Manukau Magpies | 34 – 16 | Howick Hornets | Saturday, 26 April, 2:30pm | Moyle Park | TBA |
| Ponsonby United Ponies | 32 – 12 | Northcote Tigers | Saturday, 26 April, 2:30pm | Victoria Park | TBA |
Premiership Round 1
| Richmond Rovers | 26 – 30 | Papakura Sea Eagles | Saturday, 3 May, 2:30pm | Grey Lynn Park | TBA |
| Te Atatu Roosters | 24 – 28 | Ponsonby United Ponies | Saturday, 3 May, 2:30pm | Jack Colvin Park | TBA |
| Point Chevalier Pirates | 26 – 30 | Marist Saints | Saturday, 3 May, 2:30pm | Walker Park | TBA |
| Otahuhu Leopards | 36 – 6 | Bay Roskill Vikings | Saturday, 3 May, 2:30pm | Bert Henham Park | TBA |
| Mount Albert Lions | 22 – 2 | Manukau Magpies | Saturday, 3 May, 2:30pm | Fowlds Park | TBA |
Premiership Round 2
| Marist Saints | 16 – 30 | Richmond Rovers | Saturday, 10 May, 2:30pm | Murray Halberg Park | TBA |
| Bay Roskill Vikings | 32 – 22 | Ponsonby United Ponies | Saturday, 10 May, 2:30pm | Blockhouse Bay Reserve | TBA |
| Manukau Magpies | 16 – 28 | Papakura Sea Eagles | Saturday, 10 May, 2:30pm | Moyle Park | TBA |
| Te Atatu Roosters | 21 – 14 | Mount Albert Lions | Saturday, 10 May, 2:30pm | Jack Colvin Park | TBA |
| Otahuhu Leopards | 36 – 14 | Point Chevalier Pirates | Saturday, 10 May, 2:30pm | Bert Henham Park | TBA |
Premiership Round 3
| Richmond Rovers | 28 – 24 | Bay Roskill Vikings | Saturday, 17 May, 2:30pm | Grey Lynn Park | TBA |
| Marist Saints | 6 – 18 | Manukau Magpies | Saturday, 17 May, 2:30pm | Murray Halberg Park | TBA |
| Ponsonby United Ponies | 12 – 18 | Mount Albert Lions | Saturday, 17 May, 2:30pm | Victoria Park | TBA |
| Papakura Sea Eagles | 10 – 34 | Otahuhu Leopards | Saturday, 17 May, 2:30pm | Prince Edward Park | TBA |
| Te Atatu Roosters | 20 – 32 | Point Chevalier Pirates | Saturday, 17 May, 2:30pm | Jack Colvin Park | TBA |
Premiership Round 4
| Manukau Magpies | 22 – 6 | Richmond Rovers | Saturday, 24 May, 2:30pm | Moyle Park | TBA |
| Mount Albert Lions | 42 – 16 | Bay Roskill Vikings | Saturday, 24 May, 2:30pm | Fowlds Park | TBA |
| Otahuhu Leopards | 62 – 4 | Marist Saints | Saturday, 24 May, 2:30pm | Bert Henham Park | TBA |
| Point Chevalier Pirates | 58 – 12 | Ponsonby United Ponies | Saturday, 24 May, 2:30pm | Walker Park | TBA |
| Papakura Sea Eagles | 32 – 30 | Te Atatu Roosters | Saturday, 24 May, 2:30pm | Prince Edward Park | TBA |
Premiership Round 5
| Richmond Rovers | 6 – 48 | Mount Albert Lions | Saturday, 7 June, 2:30pm | Grey Lynn Park | TBA |
| Manukau Magpies | 4 – 42 | Otahuhu Leopards | Saturday, 7 June, 2:30pm | Moyle Park | TBA |
| Bay Roskill Vikings | 20 – 52 | Point Chevalier Pirates | Saturday, 7 June, 2:30pm | Blockhouse Bay Reserve | TBA |
| Marist Saints | 42 – 28 | Te Atatu Roosters | Saturday, 7 June, 2:30pm | Murray Halberg Park | TBA |
| Ponsonby United Ponies | 6 – 64 | Papakura Sea Eagles | Saturday, 7 June, 2:30pm | Victoria Park | TBA |
Premiership Round 6
| Otahuhu Leopards | 50 – 0 | Richmond Rovers | Saturday, 14 June, 2:30pm | Bert Henham Park | TBA |
| Point Chevalier Pirates | 14 – 22 | Mount Albert Lions | Saturday, 14 June, 2:30pm | Walker Park | TBA |
| Te Atatu Roosters | 18 – 36 | Manukau Magpies | Saturday, 14 June, 2:30pm | Jack Colvin Park | TBA |
| Papakura Sea Eagles | 32 – 16 | Bay Roskill Vikings | Saturday, 14 June, 2:30pm | Prince Edward Park | TBA |
| Ponsonby United Ponies | 22 – 44 | Marist Saints | Saturday, 14 June, 2:30pm | Victoria Park | TBA |
Premiership Round 7
| Te Atatu Roosters | 16 – 30 | Bay Roskill Vikings | Saturday, 21 June, 2:30pm | Jack Colvin Park | TBA |
| Ponsonby United Ponies | 20 – 44 | Richmond Rovers | Saturday, 21 June, 2:30pm | Victoria Park | TBA |
| Mount Albert Lions | 12 – 28 | Otahuhu Leopards | Saturday, 21 June, 2:30pm | Fowlds Park | TBA |
| Marist Saints | 16 – 26 | Papakura Sea Eagles | Saturday, 21 June, 2:30pm | Murray Halberg Park | TBA |
| Manukau Magpies | 30 – 22 | Point Chevalier Pirates | Saturday, 21 June, 2:30pm | Moyle Park | TBA |
Premiership Round 8
| Richmond Rovers | 28 – 34 | Point Chevalier Pirates | Saturday, 28 June, 2:30pm | Grey Lynn Park | TBA |
| Otahuhu Leopards | 72 – 6 | Te Atatu Roosters | Saturday, 28 June, 2:30pm | Bert Henham Park | TBA |
| Mount Albert Lions | 22 – 14 | Papakura Sea Eagles | Saturday, 28 June, 2:30pm | Fowlds Park | TBA |
| Manukau Magpies | 30 – 4 | Ponsonby United Ponies | Saturday, 28 June, 2:30pm | Moyle Park | TBA |
| Bay Roskill Vikings | 14 – 12 | Marist Saints | Saturday, 28 June, 2:30pm | Blockhouse Bay Reserve | TBA |
Premiership Round 9
| Te Atatu Roosters | 4 – 46 | Richmond Rovers | Saturday, 5 July, 2:30pm | Jack Colvin Park | TBA |
| Papakura Sea Eagles | 34 – 24 | Point Chevalier Pirates | Saturday, 5 July, 2:30pm | Prince Edward Park | TBA |
| Ponsonby United Ponies | 14 – 54 | Otahuhu Leopards | Saturday, 5 July, 2:30pm | Victoria Park | TBA |
| Marist Saints | 14 – 38 | Mount Albert Lions | Saturday, 5 July, 2:30pm | Murray Halberg Park | TBA |
| Bay Roskill Vikings | 10 – 30 | Manukau Magpies | Saturday, 5 July, 2:30pm | Blockhouse Bay Reserve | TBA |
Premiership Round 10
| Mount Albert Lions | 50 – 12 | Ponsonby United Ponies | Saturday, 12 July, 2:30pm | Fowlds Park | TBA |
| Manukau Magpies | 58 – 4 | Marist Saints | Saturday, 12 July, 2:30pm | Moyle Park | TBA |
| Bay Roskill Vikings | 30 – 22 | Richmond Rovers | Saturday, 12 July, 2:30pm | Blockhouse Bay Reserve | TBA |
| Point Chevalier Pirates | 50 – 16 | Te Atatu Roosters | Saturday, 12 July, 2:30pm | Walker Park | TBA |
| Otahuhu Leopards | 46 – 4 | Papakura Sea Eagles | Saturday, 12 July, 2:30pm | Bert Henham Park | TBA |
Premiership Round 11
| Richmond Rovers | 30 – 10 | Marist Saints | Saturday, 19 July, 2:30pm | Grey Lynn Park | TBA |
| Ponsonby United Ponies | 6 – 46 | Bay Roskill Vikings | Saturday, 19 July, 2:30pm | Victoria Park | TBA |
| Papakura Sea Eagles | 22 – 25 | Manukau Magpies | Saturday, 19 July, 2:30pm | Prince Edward Park | TBA |
| Mount Albert Lions | 28 – 6 | Te Atatu Roosters | Saturday, 19 July, 2:30pm | Fowlds Park | TBA |
| Point Chevalier Pirates | 10 – 36 | Otahuhu Leopards | Saturday, 19 July, 2:30pm | Walker Park | TBA |
Premiership Round 12
| Richmond Rovers | 46 – 24 | Ponsonby United Ponies | Saturday, 26 July, 2:30pm | Grey Lynn Park | TBA |
| Papakura Sea Eagles | 22 – 16 | Marist Saints | Saturday, 26 July, 2:30pm | Prince Edward Park | TBA |
| Bay Roskill Vikings | 44 – 18 | Te Atatu Roosters | Saturday, 26 July, 2:30pm | Blockhouse Bay Reserve | TBA |
| Point Chevalier Pirates | 18 – 18 | Manukau Magpies | Saturday, 26 July, 2:30pm | Walker Park | TBA |
| Otahuhu Leopards | 26 – 4 | Mount Albert Lions | Saturday, 26 July, 2:30pm | Bert Henham Park | TBA |
Finals Series
Elimination Finals
| Manukau Magpies | 30 – 28 | Bay Roskill Vikings | Saturday, 2 August, 2:30pm | Moyle Park | TBA |
| Papakura Sea Eagles | 32 – 24 | Richmond Rovers | Saturday, 2 August, 2:30pm | Prince Edward Park | TBA |
Semi-Finals
| Otahuhu Leopards | 21 – 14 | Papakura Sea Eagles | Saturday, 9 August, 2:30pm | Bert Henham Park | TBA |
| Mount Albert Lions | 22 – 16 | Manukau Magpies | Saturday, 9 August, 2:30pm | Fowlds Park | TBA |
Grand Final
| Otahuhu Leopards | 8 – 4 | Mount Albert Lions | Sunday, 17 August, 2:45pm | Waitakere Stadium | Paki Parkinson |

==== Grand Final ====
Elimination Finals
4 | Papakura | 32
5 | Richmond | 24
3 | Manukau | 30
6 | Bay Roskill | 28

Semi-Finals
1 | Otahuhu | 21
4 | Papakura | 14
2 | Mount Albert | 22
3 | Manukau | 16

Grand Final
1 | Otahuhu | 8
2 | Mount Albert | 4

2025 Fox Memorial Premiership Grand Final

Sunday, 17 August 2025
2:45pm

| Otahuhu Leopards | 8 – 4 | Mount Albert Lions |
|---|---|---|
| Tries: Emeliano Mikalele (57') 1 Tevita Mikaele (65') 1 Goals: William Fakatoumafi 0/1; Bostyn Hakaria 0/1 | 1st: 0 – 2; 2nd: 8 – 2 | Goals: 2/2 Budda Doyle (31'p, 51'p) |

Waitakere Stadium, Auckland
Referee: Paki Parkinson
Player of the Match: Sebastine Ikahihifo

Team details
| Otahuhu | | Position | Mount Albert |
| Name | Number | Position | Number | Name |
|---|---|---|---|---|
| Andrew Nansen | 2 | Fullback | 1 | John Aitu |
| Emeliano Mikalele | 5 | Wing | 16 | Jeremiah Poutu |
| Viliami Kuli | 3 | Centre | 3 | Thompson Karena |
| Tevita Mikaele | 4 | Centre | 4 | Chaz Brown |
| Toaiti Ramsay | 19 | Wing | 5 | Kalepo Paualaisa |
| Bostyn Hakaria | 7 | Five eighth | 6 | Kahil Johnson |
| William Fakatoumafi | 1 | Half back | 7 | Dion Fraser (c) |
| Sebastine Ikahihifo | 26 | Prop forward | 21 | Pauua Papuni-Abbott |
| Phoenix Hunt | 16 | Hooker | 9 | Budda Doyle (c) |
| Jamel Hunt (c) | 13 | Prop forward | 10 | David Jardine-Ngauamo |
| Mosese Faeamani | 11 | Second row | 11 | Tommy Beale |
| Sione Feao | 12 | Second row | 12 | Lyrakai Posimani |
| Atanasio Kuea | 21 | Lock forward | 13 | Solomon Vasuvulago |
| Ben Wharton-Benedict | 8 | Interchange | 8 | Julius Patelo |
| Dylan Tavita | 9 | Interchange | 14 | Marcus Fraser |
| Connor Wharton-Purcell | 10 | Interchange | 17 | Phoenix Sorensen |
| Albert Veve | 24 | Interchange | 18 | Ethan Jardine-Ngauamo |
| Daeon Amituanai | 15 | Concussion substitute | 20 | Isaiah Fale |
| Tusa Lafaete | | Coach | | Trent Wallace |

== See also ==
- 2025 NSWRL Major Competitions
- 2025 QRL Major Competitions
- 2025 QRL Feeder Competitions
