= 2025 QRL Feeder Competitions =

Rugby league competitions

The 2025 QRL Feeder Competitions are the competitions that feed either directly or indirectly into the teams playing in QRL Major Competitions.

== Northern Division ==
=== Far North Queensland Premiership ===
The Far North Queensland Premiership (Named the FNQRL A Grade) is a Cairns based men's first grade rugby league competition that features teams from the QRL Northern Division. This competition feeds into the Northern Pride Queensland Cup team.

==== Teams ====
The competition will feature the same 11 teams as 2024.

Colours	Club	QLD Cup Affiliate	Home ground(s)	Head coach
	Atherton Roosters	Northern Pride	Mungalli Creek Dairy Stadium	TBA
	Cairns Brothers Leprechauns	Northern Pride	Stan Williams Park, Jones Park	TBA
	Cairns Kangaroos	Northern Pride	Vico Oval	TBA
	Edmonton Storm	Northern Pride	Petersen Park	TBA
	Innisfail Leprechauns	Northern Pride	Callendar Park	TBA
	Ivanhoe Knights	Northern Pride	Smithfield Sporting Complex	TBA
	Mareeba Gladiators	Northern Pride	Davies Park	TBA
	Mossman-Port Douglas Sharks	Northern Pride	Coronation Park	TBA
	Southern Suburbs Cockatoos	Northern Pride	Alley Park	TBA
	Tully Tigers	Northern Pride	Tully Showgrounds	TBA
	Yarrabah Seahawks	Northern Pride	Jilara Oval	TBA

Queensland State Map	Cairns Map
Home Venues	Home Venues

==== Ladder ====
Pos	Team	Pld	W	D	L	B	PF	PA	PD	Pts	Qualification
1	Cairns Brothers Leprechauns	16	15	0	1	2	694	235	+459	34	Minor Premiers & Major Semi-Final
2	Atherton Roosters	16	13	0	3	2	519	278	+241	30	Major Semi-Final
3	Southern Suburbs Cockatoos	16	12	0	4	2	364	304	+60	28	Elimination Finals
4	Mossman-Port Douglas Sharks	16	9	1	6	2	445	430	+15	23	Elimination Finals
5	Ivanhoe Knights	16	8	1	7	2	342	389	–47	21	Elimination Finals
6	Cairns Kangaroos	16	7	1	8	2	499	437	+62	19	Elimination Finals
7	Tully Tigers	16	7	0	9	2	484	432	+52	18	
8	Mareeba Gladiators	16	5	1	10	2	450	484	–34	15	
9	Yarrabah Seahawks	16	4	2	10	2	383	483	-100	14	
10	Innisfail Leprechauns	16	5	0	11	2	380	488	-108	14	
11	Edmonton Storm	16	0	0	16	2	168	768	-600	4	

Updated to match(es) played on 1 September. Source:
Rules for classification: 1) points; 2) point difference; 3) points scored

===== Ladder progression =====
- Numbers highlighted in green indicate that the team finished the round inside the top 6.
- Numbers highlighted in blue indicates the team finished first on the ladder in that round.
- Numbers highlighted in red indicates the team finished last place on the ladder in that round.
- Underlined numbers indicate that the team had a bye during that round.

Pos	Team	1	2	3	4	5	6	7	8	9	10	11	12	13	14	15	16	17	18
1	Cairns Brothers Leprechauns	2	4	6	8	10	10	12	14	16	18	20	22	24	26	28	30	32	34
2	Atherton Roosters	2	4	4	6	8	10	12	14	16	18	20	20	22	22	24	26	28	30
3	Southern Suburbs Cockatoos	2	4	6	8	10	12	14	16	18	18	18	20	20	22	24	26	26	28
4	Mossman-Port Douglas Sharks	2	4	4	5	5	7	9	9	11	11	13	13	15	15	17	19	21	23
5	Ivanhoe Knights	0	2	2	2	4	6	6	6	8	10	12	12	13	13	15	17	19	21
6	Cairns Kangaroos	0	2	4	4	4	4	6	6	6	8	10	12	14	16	17	17	19	19
7	Tully Tigers	0	0	2	4	4	4	4	4	6	8	10	12	14	16	16	18	18	18
8	Mareeba Gladiators	0	0	2	3	5	7	9	11	11	11	11	13	13	15	15	15	15	15
9	Yarrabah Seahawks	0	0	0	0	0	2	4	4	4	6	8	10	11	13	14	14	14	14
10	Innisfail Leprechauns	2	2	4	6	8	8	8	10	10	10	10	10	10	10	10	10	12	14
11	Edmonton Storm	2	2	2	2	2	2	2	4	4	4	4	4	4	4	4	4	4	4

Season Results:

Home	Score	Away	Match Information
Home	Score	Away	Date and Time	Venue	Referee	Video
Round 1
Mossman-Port Douglas Sharks	24 – 12	Yarrabah Seahawks	Saturday, 22 March, 3:00pm	Coronation Park	TBA
Atherton Roosters	30 – 16	Mareeba Gladiators	Saturday, 22 March, 3:00pm	Mungalli Creek Dairy Stadium	TBA
Cairns Kangaroos	24 – 34	Southern Suburbs Cockatoos	Saturday, 22 March, 3:00pm	Vico Oval	TBA
Ivanhoe Knights	20 – 42	Cairns Brothers Leprechauns	Sunday, 23 March, 3:00pm	Smithfield Sporting Complex	TBA
Tully Tigers	12 – 42	Innisfail Leprechauns	Sunday, 23 March, 3:00pm	Tully Showgrounds	TBA
Edmonton Storm		BYE
Round 2
Southern Suburbs Cockatoos	42 – 16	Edmonton Storm	Saturday, 29 March, 3:00pm	Alley Park	TBA
Mossman-Port Douglas Sharks	22 – 14	Tully Tigers	Saturday, 29 March, 3:00pm	Coronation Park	TBA
Yarrabah Seahawks	20 – 34	Cairns Kangaroos	Saturday, 29 March, 3:00pm	Jilara Oval	TBA
Atherton Roosters	48 – 30	Innisfail Leprechauns	Sunday, 30 March, 3:00pm	Mungalli Creek Dairy Stadium	TBA
Ivanhoe Knights	32 – 26	Mareeba Gladiators	Sunday, 30 March, 3:00pm	Smithfield Sporting Complex	TBA
Cairns Brothers Leprechauns		BYE
Round 3
Southern Suburbs Cockatoos	18 – 12	Atherton Roosters	Saturday, 5 April, 3:00pm	Alley Park	TBA
Mossman-Port Douglas Sharks	11 – 12	Cairns Brothers Leprechauns	Saturday, 5 April, 3:00pm	Coronation Park	TBA
Cairns Kangaroos	44 – 16	Ivanhoe Knights	Saturday, 5 April, 3:00pm	Vico Oval	TBA
Mareeba Gladiators	34 – 6	Yarrabah Seahawks	Sunday, 6 April, 3:00pm	Davies Park	TBA
Edmonton Storm	18 – 64	Innisfail Leprechauns	Sunday, 6 April, 3:00pm	Petersen Park	TBA
Tully Tigers		BYE
Round 4
Edmonton Storm	12 – 54	Tully Tigers	Saturday, 12 April, 3:00pm	Petersen Park	TBA
Ivanhoe Knights	8 – 22	Atherton Roosters	Saturday, 12 April, 3:00pm	Smithfield Sporting Complex	TBA
Cairns Kangaroos	10 – 46	Cairns Brothers Leprechauns	Saturday, 12 April, 3:00pm	Vico Oval	TBA
Yarrabah Seahawks	22 – 24	Southern Suburbs Cockatoos	Sunday, 13 April, 3:00pm	Bill Wakeham Park	TBA
Mareeba Gladiators	32 – 32	Mossman-Port Douglas Sharks	Sunday, 13 April, 3:00pm	Davies Park	TBA
Innisfail Leprechauns		BYE
Round 5 (ANZAC Round)
Mareeba Gladiators	74 – 0	Edmonton Storm	Friday, 25 April, 3:00pm	Davies Park	TBA
Yarrabah Seahawks	12 – 48	Atherton Roosters	Friday, 25 April, 3:00pm	Jilara Oval	TBA
Ivanhoe Knights	42 – 20	Mossman-Port Douglas Sharks	Friday, 25 April, 3:00pm	Smithfield Sporting Complex	TBA
Innisfail Leprechauns	34 – 28	Cairns Kangaroos	Saturday, 26 April, 3:00pm	Callendar Park	TBA
Tully Tigers	18 – 28	Southern Suburbs Cockatoos	Saturday, 26 April, 3:00pm	Tully Showgrounds	TBA
Cairns Brothers Leprechauns		BYE
Round 6
Yarrabah Seahawks	44 – 18	Edmonton Storm	Saturday, 10 May, 3:00pm	Jilara Oval	TBA
Atherton Roosters	42 – 32	Cairns Brothers Leprechauns	Saturday, 10 May, 3:00pm	Mungalli Creek Dairy Stadium	TBA
Tully Tigers	4 – 16	Ivanhoe Knights	Saturday, 10 May, 3:00pm	Tully Showgrounds	TBA
Innisfail Leprechauns	18 – 40	Mareeba Gladiators	Sunday, 11 May, 3:00pm	Callendar Park	TBA
Mossman-Port Douglas Sharks	24 – 20	Cairns Kangaroos	Sunday, 11 May, 3:00pm	Coronation Park	TBA
Southern Suburbs Cockatoos		BYE
Round 7
Atherton Roosters	32 – 14	Tully Tigers	Saturday, 17 May, 3:00pm	Mungalli Creek Dairy Stadium	TBA
Cairns Brothers Leprechauns	60 – 12	Innisfail Leprechauns	Saturday, 17 May, 3:00pm	Stan Williams Park	TBA
Southern Suburbs Cockatoos	26 – 24	Ivanhoe Knights	Sunday, 18 May, 3:00pm	Alley Park	TBA
Edmonton Storm	26 – 50	Mossman-Port Douglas Sharks	Sunday, 18 May, 3:00pm	Petersen Park	TBA
Mareeba Gladiators	BYE	Cairns Kangaroos
Yarrabah Seahawks	BYE
Round 8
Mossman-Port Douglas Sharks	12 – 14	Southern Suburbs Cockatoos	Saturday, 24 May, 3:00pm	Coronation Park	TBA
Cairns Brothers Leprechauns	38 – 18	Tully Tigers	Saturday, 24 May, 3:00pm	Stan Williams Park	TBA
Cairns Kangaroos	32 – 44	Mareeba Gladiators	Saturday, 24 May, 3:00pm	Vico Oval	TBA
Innisfail Leprechauns	52 – 30	Yarrabah Seahawks	Sunday, 25 May, 3:00pm	Callendar Park	TBA
Atherton Roosters	29 – 22	Ivanhoe Knights	Sunday, 25 May, 3:00pm	Mungalli Creek Dairy Stadium	TBA
Edmonton Storm		BYE
Round 9
Southern Suburbs Cockatoos	24 – 22	Cairns Kangaroos	Saturday, 31 May, 3:00pm	Alley Park	TBA
Mareeba Gladiators	14 – 38	Cairns Brothers Leprechauns	Saturday, 31 May, 3:00pm	Davies Park	TBA
Ivanhoe Knights	26 – 18	Innisfail Leprechauns	Saturday, 31 May, 3:00pm	Smithfield Sporting Complex	TBA
Edmonton Storm	4 – 72	Atherton Roosters	Sunday, 1 June, 3:00pm	Petersen Park	TBA
Tully Tigers	44 – 36	Yarrabah Seahawks	Sunday, 1 June, 3:00pm	Tully Showgrounds	TBA
Mossman-Port Douglas Sharks		BYE
Round 10
Atherton Roosters	56 – 6	Mossman-Port Douglas Sharks	Saturday, 7 June, 3:00pm	Mungalli Creek Dairy Stadium	TBA
Cairns Brothers Leprechauns	40 – 12	Southern Suburbs Cockatoos	Saturday, 7 June, 3:00pm	Stan Williams Park	TBA
Yarrabah Seahawks	32 – 26	Mareeba Gladiators	Sunday, 8 June, 3:00pm	Jilara Oval	TBA
Tully Tigers	120 – 12	Edmonton Storm	Sunday, 8 June, 3:00pm	Tully Showgrounds	TBA
Cairns Kangaroos	54 – 16	Innisfail Leprechauns	Sunday, 8 June, 3:00pm	Vico Oval	TBA
Ivanhoe Knights		BYE
Round 11
Mossman-Port Douglas Sharks	24 – 22	Innisfail Leprechauns	Saturday, 21 June, 3:00pm	Coronation Park	TBA
Mareeba Gladiators	30 – 32	Tully Tigers	Saturday, 21 June, 3:00pm	Davies Park	TBA
Ivanhoe Knights	26 – 24	Southern Suburbs Cockatoos	Saturday, 21 June, 3:00pm	Smithfield Sporting Complex	TBA
Edmonton Storm	10 – 76	Cairns Brothers Leprechauns	Sunday, 22 June, 3:00pm	Petersen Park	TBA
Cairns Kangaroos	BYE	Atherton Roosters
Yarrabah Seahawks	BYE
Round 12
Innisfail Leprechauns	12 – 28	Tully Tigers	Saturday, 28 June, 3:00pm	Callendar Park	TBA
Mareeba Gladiators	30 – 22	Atherton Roosters	Saturday, 28 June, 3:00pm	Davies Park	TBA
Yarrabah Seahawks	40 – 26	Mossman-Port Douglas Sharks	Sunday, 29 June, 3:00pm	Jilara Oval	TBA
Edmonton Storm	16 – 64	Cairns Kangaroos	Sunday, 29 June, 3:00pm	Petersen Park	TBA
Cairns Brothers Leprechauns	42 – 6	Ivanhoe Knights	Sunday, 29 June, 3:00pm	Stan Williams Park	TBA
Southern Suburbs Cockatoos		BYE
Round 13
Southern Suburbs Cockatoos	12 – 30	Cairns Brothers Leprechauns	Saturday, 5 July, 3:00pm	Alley Park	TBA
Innisfail Leprechauns	16 – 32	Atherton Roosters	Saturday, 5 July, 3:00pm	Callendar Park	TBA
Mareeba Gladiators	16 – 28	Cairns Kangaroos	Saturday, 5 July, 3:00pm	Davies Park	TBA
Mossman-Port Douglas Sharks	70 – 12	Edmonton Storm	Sunday, 6 July, 3:00pm	Coronation Park	TBA
Yarrabah Seahawks	26 – 26	Ivanhoe Knights	Sunday, 6 July, 3:00pm	Jilara Oval	TBA
Tully Tigers		BYE
Round 14
Edmonton Storm	24 – 38	Yarrabah Seahawks	Saturday, 12 July, 3:00pm	Petersen Park	TBA
Cairns Kangaroos	36 – 24	Atherton Roosters	Saturday, 12 July, 3:00pm	Vico Oval	TBA
Southern Suburbs Cockatoos	50 – 14	Innisfail Leprechauns	Sunday, 13 July, 3:00pm	Alley Park	TBA
Ivanhoe Knights	28 – 30	Tully Tigers	Sunday, 13 July, 3:00pm	Smithfield Sporting Complex	TBA
Cairns Brothers Leprechauns	54 – 24	Mossman-Port Douglas Sharks	Sunday, 13 July, 3:00pm	Stan Williams Park	TBA
Mareeba Gladiators		BYE
Round 15
Innisfail Leprechauns	18 – 24	Mossman-Port Douglas Sharks	Saturday, 19 July, 3:00pm	Callendar Park	TBA
Tully Tigers	18 – 42	Cairns Brothers Leprechauns	Saturday, 19 July, 3:00pm	Tully Showgrounds	TBA
Southern Suburbs Cockatoos	32 – 16	Mareeba Gladiators	Sunday, 20 July, 3:00pm	Alley Park	TBA
Cairns Kangaroos	27 – 27	Yarrabah Seahawks	Sunday, 20 July, 3:00pm	Vico Oval	TBA
Atherton Roosters	0* – 0	Edmonton Storm	N/A
Ivanhoe Knights		BYE
Round 16
Innisfail Leprechauns	12 – 14	Ivanhoe Knights	Saturday, 26 July, 3:00pm	Callendar Park	TBA
Yarrabah Seahawks	30 – 40	Tully Tigers	Saturday, 26 July, 3:00pm	Jilara Oval	TBA
Cairns Brothers Leprechauns	70 – 0	Mareeba Gladiators	Sunday, 27 July, 3:00pm	Stan Williams Park	TBA
Cairns Kangaroos	28 – 32	Mossman-Port Douglas Sharks	Sunday, 27 July, 3:00pm	Vico Oval	TBA
Edmonton Storm	0 – 0*	Southern Suburbs Cockatoos	N/A
Atherton Roosters		BYE
Round 17
Cairns Brothers Leprechauns	36 – 8	Yarrabah Seahawks	Saturday, 2 August, 3:00pm	Stan Williams Park	TBA
Tully Tigers	28 – 30	Cairns Kangaroos	Saturday, 2 August, 3:00pm	Tully Showgrounds	TBA
Mareeba Gladiators	22 – 36	Ivanhoe Knights	Sunday, 3 August, 3:00pm	Davies Park	TBA
Atherton Roosters	28 – 24	Southern Suburbs Cockatoos	Sunday, 3 August, 3:00pm	Mungalli Creek Dairy Stadium	TBA
Innisfail Leprechauns	0* – 0	Edmonton Storm	N/A
Mossman-Port Douglas Sharks		BYE
Round 18
Mossman-Port Douglas Sharks	44 – 28	Mareeba Gladiators	Sunday, 10 August, 3:00pm	Coronation Park	TBA
Cairns Brothers Leprechauns	36 – 18	Cairns Kangaroos	Sunday, 10 August, 3:00pm	Stan Williams Park	TBA
Tully Tigers	10 – 22	Atherton Roosters	Sunday, 10 August, 3:00pm	Tully Showgrounds	TBA
Southern Suburbs Cockatoos	0* – 0	Yarrabah Seahawks	N/A
Ivanhoe Knights	0* – 0	Edmonton Storm	N/A
Innisfail Leprechauns		BYE
Finals Series
Elimination Finals
Southern Suburbs Cockatoos	40 – 26	Cairns Kangaroos	Saturday, 16 August, 5:20pm	Tully Showgrounds	TBA
Mossman-Port Douglas Sharks	14 – 36	Ivanhoe Knights	Saturday, 16 August, 7:00pm	Tully Showgrounds	TBA
Major & Minor Semi-Finals
Southern Suburbs Cockatoos	56 – 6	Ivanhoe Knights	Saturday, 23 August, 5:20pm	Mungalli Creek Dairy Stadium	TBA
Cairns Brothers Leprechauns	38 – 12	Atherton Roosters	Saturday, 23 August, 7:00pm	Mungalli Creek Dairy Stadium	TBA
Preliminary Final
Atherton Roosters	10 – 36	Southern Suburbs Cockatoos	Sunday, 31 August, 3:00pm	Stan Williams Park	TBA
Grand Final
Cairns Brothers Leprechauns	18 – 12	Southern Suburbs Cockatoos	Saturday, 6 September, 7:00pm	Barlow Park	TBA

==== Grand Final ====
Elimination Finals
3	Southern Suburbs	40
6	Cairns	26
4	Mossman-Port Douglas	14
5	Ivanhoe	36

Semi-Finals
1	Cairns Brothers	38
2	Atherton	12
3	Southern Suburbs	56
5	Ivanhoe	6

Preliminary Final
2	Atherton	10
3	Southern Suburbs	36

Grand Final
1	Cairns Brothers	18
3	Southern Suburbs	12

2025 Far North Queensland Premiership Grand Final

Saturday, 6 September 2025
7:00pm

Cairns Brothers Leprechauns	18 – 12	Southern Suburbs Cockatoos
Tries: Bernard Lewis (3', 36') 2 Mareko Daniel (32') 1 Goals: Jordan Biondi-Odo 3/3 (5', 33', 37')	1st: 18 – 0; 2nd: 0 – 12	Tries: 1 (48') Ricco Falaniko; 1 (68') Rickki Sutherland; Goals: 2/2 James Frazer (49', 70')

Barlow Park, Cairns

Team details
Cairns Brothers		Position	Southern Suburbs
Name	Number	Position	Number	Name
Lachlan Biondi-Odo	1	Fullback	1	Ashton Galea
Liam O'Brien	2	Wing	2	Wes Walker
Isaiah Wigness	3	Centre	3	Kody Oliver
Bernard Lewis	4	Centre	4	Rickki Sutherland (c)
Amari Macfarlane	5	Wing	5	Ricco Falaniko
Patrick Lewis	20	Five eighth	6	James Frazer
Jordan Biondi-Odo (c)	7	Half back	7	Aiden Carson
Taniela Ta'ufo'ou	8	Prop forward	8	Aidan Day
Adam Hepworth	9	Hooker	9	Jayden Connors
Joseph Wigness	10	Prop forward	10	Jack Webster
Ernest Suavai	11	Second row	11	Jay Haywood-Scriven
Sam Cramp	12	Second row	12	Harry Lawry
Tom Spark	13	Lock forward	13	Sonny Bin-Garape
Falcon Ataera	6	Interchange	14	Ty Chambers
Daley Jones	15	Interchange	15	Elia Mooka
Eddie Daniel	16	Interchange	16	Tom Dodd
Daniel Hindmarsh-Takyi	17	Interchange	17	Gene Kubala
Timothy Rumford		Coach		Graham Clark

=== Mackay Premiership ===
The Mackay Premiership (Named the NQBE A Grade) is a Mackay based men's first grade rugby league competition that features teams from the QRL Northern Division. This competition feeds into the Mackay Cutters Queensland Cup team.

==== Teams ====
There is 1 change for 2025 with Northern Suburbs dropping out of the first grade competition.

Colours	Club	QLD Cup Affiliate	Home ground(s)	Head coach
	Mackay Brothers Leprechauns	Mackay Cutters	Leprechaun Park	TBA
	Mackay Magpies	Mackay Cutters	Sologinkin Oval	TBA
	Moranbah Miners	Mackay Cutters	Daryl Bourke Oval	TBA
	Sarina Crocodiles	Mackay Cutters	Ray Edwards Oval	TBA
	Souths Sharks	Mackay Cutters	Shark Park	TBA
	Wests Tigers Mackay	Mackay Cutters	Tiger Park	TBA
	Whitsunday Brahmans	Mackay Cutters	Les Stagg Oval	TBA

Queensland State Map	Mackay Map
Home Venues	Home Venues

==== Ladder ====
Pos	Team	Pld	W	D	L	B	PF	PA	PD	Pts	Qualification
1	Moranbah Miners	13	11	1	1	2	454	182	+272	27	Minor Premiers & Major Semi-Final
2	Souths Sharks	13	11	1	1	2	472	202	+270	27	Qualifying Final
3	Mackay Brothers Leprechauns	13	10	0	3	2	394	212	+182	24	Qualifying Final
4	Mackay Magpies	13	6	0	7	2	314	284	+30	16	Elimination Final
5	Sarina Crocodiles	13	3	0	10	2	276	382	-106	10	Elimination Final
6	Wests Tigers Mackay	13	3	0	10	2	182	412	-230	10	
7	Whitsunday Brahmans	12	0	0	12	3	122	540	-418	6	

Updated to match(es) played on 1 September. Source:
Rules for classification: 1) points; 2) point difference; 3) points scored

==== Ladder progression ====
- Numbers highlighted in green indicate that the team finished the round inside the top 5.
- Numbers highlighted in blue indicates the team finished first on the ladder in that round.
- Numbers highlighted in red indicates the team finished last place on the ladder in that round.
- Underlined numbers indicate that the team had a bye during that round.

Pos	Team	2	3	4	5	6	7	8	9	1	10	11	12	13	14	15
1	Moranbah Miners	2	4	6	8	10	12	14	16	18	18	19	21	23	25	27
2	Souths Sharks	2	4	4	6	8	10	12	14	16	18	19	21	23	25	27
3	Mackay Brothers Leprechauns	2	2	4	4	6	8	10	12	14	16	18	20	20	22	24
4	Mackay Magpies	0	2	4	6	6	6	8	8	8	10	12	12	14	16	16
5	Sarina Crocodiles	0	0	2	2	2	4	4	4	4	6	8	8	8	8	10
6	Wests Tigers Mackay	2	4	4	6	6	6	6	8	8	8	8	8	10	10	10
7	Whitsunday Brahmans	0	0	0	0	2	2	2	2	4	4	4	6	6	6	6

Season Results:

Home	Score	Away	Match Information
Home	Score	Away	Date and Time	Venue	Referee	Video
Round 1
Sarina Crocodiles	24 – 32	Mackay Brothers Leprechauns	Saturday, 21 June, 7:00pm	Mackay Junior Rugby League Oval	TBA
Moranbah Miners	38 – 0	Wests Tigers Mackay	Sunday, 22 June, 3:00pm	Mackay Junior Rugby League Oval	TBA
Mackay Magpies	8 – 44	Souths Sharks	Sunday, 22 June, 3:00pm	Mackay Junior Rugby League Oval	TBA
Whitsunday Brahmans		BYE
Round 2
Moranbah Miners	34 – 10	Mackay Magpies	Saturday, 5 April, 3:00pm	Daryl Bourke Oval	TBA
Souths Sharks	46 – 10	Sarina Crocodiles	Sunday, 6 April, 3:00pm	Shark Park	TBA
Wests Tigers Mackay	42 – 10	Whitsunday Brahmans	Sunday, 6 April, 3:00pm	Tiger Park	TBA
Mackay Brothers Leprechauns		BYE
Round 3
Whitsunday Brahmans	6 – 40	Souths Sharks	Saturday, 12 April, 3:00pm	Les Stagg Oval	TBA
Moranbah Miners	22 – 4	Mackay Brothers Leprechauns	Sunday, 13 April, 3:00pm	Daryl Bourke Oval	TBA
Sarina Crocodiles	12 – 20	Wests Tigers Mackay	Sunday, 13 April, 3:00pm	Ray Edwards Oval	TBA
Mackay Magpies		BYE
Round 4 (ANZAC Round)
Mackay Brothers Leprechauns	52 – 0	Whitsunday Brahmans	Saturday, 26 April, 3:00pm	Leprechaun Park	TBA
Souths Sharks	16 – 18	Moranbah Miners	Sunday, 27 April, 3:00pm	Shark Park	TBA
Wests Tigers Mackay	12 – 14	Mackay Magpies	Sunday, 27 April, 3:00pm	Tiger Park	TBA
Sarina Crocodiles		BYE
Round 5
Moranbah Miners	50 – 10	Whitsunday Brahmans	Saturday, 10 May, 3:00pm	Daryl Bourke Oval	TBA
Souths Sharks	22 – 16	Mackay Brothers Leprechauns	Sunday, 11 May, 3:00pm	Shark Park	TBA
Mackay Magpies	34 – 16	Sarina Crocodiles	Sunday, 11 May, 3:00pm	Sologinkin Oval	TBA
Wests Tigers Mackay		BYE
Round 6
Sarina Crocodiles	16 – 26	Mackay Brothers Leprechauns	Saturday, 17 May, 3:00pm	Ray Edwards Oval	TBA
Wests Tigers Mackay	8 – 48	Moranbah Miners	Saturday, 17 May, 3:00pm	Tiger Park	TBA
Mackay Magpies	18 – 40	Souths Sharks	Sunday, 18 May, 3:00pm	Sologinkin Oval	TBA
Whitsunday Brahmans		BYE
Round 7
Mackay Brothers Leprechauns	24 – 22	Mackay Magpies	Saturday, 31 May, 3:00pm	Leprechaun Park	TBA
Souths Sharks	34 – 4	Wests Tigers Mackay	Saturday, 31 May, 3:00pm	Shark Park	TBA
Sarina Crocodiles	28 – 12	Whitsunday Brahmans	Sunday, 1 June, 3:00pm	Ray Edwards Oval	TBA
Moranbah Miners		BYE
Round 8
Moranbah Miners	28 – 12	Sarina Crocodiles	Saturday, 7 June, 3:00pm	Daryl Bourke Oval	TBA
Whitsunday Brahmans	16 – 32	Mackay Magpies	Saturday, 7 June, 3:00pm	Les Stagg Oval	TBA
Mackay Brothers Leprechauns	44 – 0	Wests Tigers Mackay	Sunday, 8 June, 3:00pm	Leprechaun Park	TBA
Souths Sharks		BYE
Round 9
Whitsunday Brahmans	20 – 36	Wests Tigers Mackay	Saturday, 14 June, 3:00pm	Les Stagg Oval	TBA
Sarina Crocodiles	24 – 42	Souths Sharks	Saturday, 14 June, 3:00pm	Ray Edwards Oval	TBA
Mackay Magpies	22 – 24	Moranbah Miners	Sunday, 15 June, 3:00pm	Sologinkin Oval	TBA
Mackay Brothers Leprechauns		BYE
Round 10
Mackay Brothers Leprechauns	40 – 24	Moranbah Miners	Saturday, 28 June, 3:00pm	Leprechaun Park	TBA
Souths Sharks	62 – 14	Whitsunday Brahmans	Saturday, 28 June, 3:00pm	Shark Park	TBA
Wests Tigers Mackay	22 – 24	Sarina Crocodiles	Sunday, 29 June, 3:00pm	Tiger Park	TBA
Mackay Magpies		BYE
Round 11
Moranbah Miners	22 – 22	Souths Sharks	Saturday, 5 July, 3:00pm	Daryl Bourke Oval	TBA
Whitsunday Brahmans	12 – 30	Mackay Brothers Leprechauns	Sunday, 6 July, 3:00pm	Les Stagg Oval	TBA
Mackay Magpies	56 – 6	Wests Tigers Mackay	Sunday, 6 July, 3:00pm	Sologinkin Oval	TBA
Sarina Crocodiles		BYE
Round 12
Moranbah Miners	40 – 12	Wests Tigers Mackay	Saturday, 12 July, 3:00pm	Daryl Bourke Oval	TBA
Mackay Brothers Leprechauns	46 – 16	Sarina Crocodiles	Sunday, 13 July, 3:00pm	Leprechaun Park	TBA
Souths Sharks	24 – 22	Mackay Magpies	Sunday, 13 July, 3:00pm	Shark Park	TBA
Whitsunday Brahmans		BYE
Round 13
Whitsunday Brahmans	4 – 78	Moranbah Miners	Saturday, 19 July, 3:00pm	Les Stagg Oval	TBA
Sarina Crocodiles	22 – 28	Mackay Magpies	Saturday, 19 July, 3:00pm	Ray Edwards Oval	TBA
Mackay Brothers Leprechauns	32 – 34	Souths Sharks	Sunday, 20 July, 3:00pm	Leprechaun Park	TBA
Wests Tigers Mackay		BYE
Round 14
Mackay Magpies	40 – 0	Whitsunday Brahmans	Saturday, 2 August, 3:00pm	Sologinkin Oval	TBA
Wests Tigers Mackay	12 – 26	Mackay Brothers Leprechauns	Saturday, 2 August, 3:00pm	Tiger Park	TBA
Sarina Crocodiles	22 – 28	Moranbah Miners	Sunday, 3 August, 3:00pm	Ray Edwards Oval	TBA
Souths Sharks		BYE
Round 15
Whitsunday Brahmans	18 – 50	Sarina Crocodiles	Saturday, 9 August, 3:00pm	Les Stagg Oval	TBA
Mackay Magpies	8 – 22	Mackay Brothers Leprechauns	Saturday, 9 August, 3:00pm	Sologinkin Oval	TBA
Wests Tigers Mackay	8 – 46	Souths Sharks	Sunday, 10 August, 3:00pm	Tiger Park	TBA
Moranbah Miners		BYE
Finals Series
Qualifying & Elimination Finals
Mackay Magpies	22 – 14	Sarina Crocodiles	Sunday, 17 August, 3:00pm	Mackay Junior Rugby League Oval	TBA
Souths Sharks	30 – 26	Mackay Brothers Leprechauns	Sunday, 17 August, 3:00pm	Mackay Junior Rugby League Oval	TBA
Major & Minor Semi-Finals
Mackay Brothers Leprechauns	38 – 18	Mackay Magpies	Sunday, 24 August, 3:00pm	Mackay Junior Rugby League Oval	TBA
Moranbah Miners	26 – 36	Souths Sharks	Sunday, 24 August, 3:00pm	Mackay Junior Rugby League Oval	TBA
Preliminary Final
Moranbah Miners	22 – 24	Mackay Brothers Leprechauns	Sunday, 31 August, 3:00pm	Mackay Junior Rugby League Oval	TBA
Grand Final
Souths Sharks	24 – 6	Mackay Brothers Leprechauns	Saturday, 6 September, 6:00pm	BB Print Stadium	Jeremy Meadows

==== Grand Final ====
Qualifying & Elimination Finals
2	Souths	30
3	Mackay Brothers	26
4	Mackay	22
5	Sarina	14

Major Semi-Final
1	Moranbah	26
2	Souths	36
Minor Semi-Final
3	Mackay Brothers	38
4	Mackay	18

Preliminary Final
1	Moranbah	22
3	Mackay Brothers	24

Grand Final
2	Souths	24
3	Mackay Brothers	6

2025 Mackay Premiership Grand Final

Saturday, 6 September 2025
6:00pm

Souths Sharks	24 – 6	Mackay Brothers Leprechauns
Tries: Marmin Barba (46', 51') 2 Blake Coombes (14') 1 Jesuah Wini (80') 1 Goals: Ben Barba 4/5 (15', 48', 52', 70'p)	1st: 6 – 6; 2nd: 18 – 0	Tries: 1 (23') Thomas McNulty; Goals: 1/1 Jared Maguire (24')

BB Print Stadium, Mackay
Referee: Jeremy Meadows
Touch judges: Nicholas Bowyer & Thomas Horne

Team details
Souths		Position	Mackay Brothers
Name	Number	Position	Number	Name
Tyrese Parter	1	Fullback	1	Kooper Shears
Maika Tudravu	2	Wing	2	Matthew Skaife
Sam Fa'apito	3	Centre	3	Steven Stafford
Jesuah Wini	4	Centre	4	Jayden Batchelor
Nathan Ray	5	Wing	5	Jared Maguire
Marmin Barba	6	Five eighth	6	Luke Fletcher
Ben Barba	7	Half back	7	Brad Campbell
Julius Kapeli	8	Prop forward	8	Garrett Smith
Quintel Wailu	9	Hooker	9	Dan Kelly
Blake Coombes (c)	10	Prop forward	10	Alfie Schultz
George Hillman	11	Second row	11	Aidan Beard
Mahe Fonua	12	Second row	12	Jack Hoffmann
Jake Kearton	13	Lock forward	13	Baden Robinson
Billy Vincent	14	Interchange	14	Henry Thorpe
Zach Schill	16	Interchange	15	Rory Woodall
Sam Kasiano	18	Interchange	16	Tom McNulty
Tyler O'Brien	19	Interchange	17	Josh Honan
Mark Bowden		Coach		Tom Heggie

=== Townsville Premiership ===
The Townsville Premiership (Named the RLTD A Grade) is a Townsville based men's first grade rugby league competition that features teams from the QRL Northern Division. This competition feeds into the Townsville Blackhawks Queensland Cup team.

==== Teams ====
The lineup for 2025 will remain the same as 2024.

Colours	Club	QLD Cup Affiliate	Home ground(s)	Head coach
	Burdekin Roosters	Townsville Blackhawks	Rugby Park	TBA
	Centrals ASA Tigers	Townsville Blackhawks	Townsville Sports Reserve	TBA
	Charters Towers Miners	Townsville Blackhawks	Bill Lewis Oval	TBA
	Herbert River Crushers	Townsville Blackhawks	Artie Gofton Oval	TBA
	North Thuringowa Devils	Townsville Blackhawks	Peggy Banfield Park	TBA
	Souths Bulls	Townsville Blackhawks	Victoria Park	TBA
	Townsville Brothers Leprechauns	Townsville Blackhawks	Jack Manski Oval	TBA
	Western Lions	Townsville Blackhawks	Neil Stewart Park	TBA

==== Ladder ====
Pos	Team	Pld	W	D	L	B	PF	PA	PD	Pts	Qualification
1	Souths Bulls	16	16	0	0	2	618	208	+410	36	Minor Premiers & Major Semi-Final
2	Townsville Brothers Leprechauns	16	11	1	4	2	448	324	+126	27	Major Semi-Final
3	Herbert River Crushers	16	8	0	8	2	330	346	–16	20	Minor Semi-Final
4	Western Lions	16	7	2	7	2	356	450	–94	20	Minor Semi-Final
5	Burdekin Roosters	16	6	0	10	2	316	446	-130	16	
6	North Thuringowa Devils	16	5	1	10	2	332	452	-120	15	
7	Charters Towers Miners	16	5	0	11	2	330	394	–64	14	
8	Centrals ASA Tigers	16	4	0	12	2	260	370	-110	12	

Updated to match(es) played on 1 September. Source:
Rules for classification: 1) points; 2) point difference; 3) points scored

===== Ladder progression =====
- Numbers highlighted in green indicate that the team finished the round inside the top 4.
- Numbers highlighted in blue indicates the team finished first on the ladder in that round.
- Numbers highlighted in red indicates the team finished last place on the ladder in that round.
- Underlined numbers indicate that the team had a bye during that round.

Pos	Team	2	3	4	5	6	7	8	9	10	11	1	12	13	14	15	16	17	18
1	Souths Bulls	2	4	6	8	10	12	14	16	18	20	22	24	26	28	30	32	34	36
2	Townsville Brothers Leprechauns	2	4	4	6	8	10	10	12	14	16	18	20	22	24	25	25	27	27
3	Herbert River Crushers	2	4	6	6	6	6	8	8	10	12	12	14	16	18	20	20	20	20
4	Western Lions	0	0	0	2	2	4	4	4	6	7	9	11	13	13	14	16	18	20
5	Burdekin Roosters	0	0	0	2	4	6	8	8	10	10	12	12	12	12	12	14	14	16
6	North Thuringowa Devils	2	2	4	6	6	6	6	6	6	7	7	7	9	11	11	11	13	15
7	Charters Towers Miners	2	4	6	6	6	8	8	10	10	10	10	10	10	10	12	12	12	14
8	Centrals ASA Tigers	0	0	0	0	2	2	4	6	6	6	8	8	8	8	10	12	12	12

Season Results:

Home	Score	Away	Match Information
Home	Score	Away	Date and Time	Venue	Referee	Video
Round 1
Burdekin Roosters	8 – 6	North Thuringowa Devils	Saturday, 5 July, 4:30pm	Rugby Park	TBA
Western Lions	46 – 20	Charters Towers Miners	Saturday, 5 July, 4:30pm	Neil Stewart Park	TBA
Souths Bulls	32 – 14	Herbert River Crushers	Sunday, 6 July, 3:30pm	Victoria Park	TBA
Centrals ASA Tigers	BYE	Townsville Brothers Leprechauns			TBA
Round 2
Souths Bulls	52 – 0	Western Lions	Saturday, 12 April, 6:30pm	Neil Stewart Park	TBA
Townsville Brothers Leprechauns	40 – 10	Burdekin Roosters	Sunday, 13 April, 3:30pm	Jack Manski Oval	TBA
Centrals ASA Tigers	10 – 18	Herbert River Crushers	Sunday, 13 April, 3:30pm	Townsville Sports Reserve	TBA
Charters Towers Miners	BYE	North Thuringowa Devils
Round 3 (ANZAC Round)
Centrals ASA Tigers	16 – 18	Charters Towers Miners	Saturday, 26 April, 3:00pm	Townsville Sports Reserve	TBA
Townsville Brothers Leprechauns	42 – 12	Western Lions	Saturday, 26 April, 4:30pm	Jack Manski Oval	TBA
Herbert River Crushers	34 – 22	North Thuringowa Devils	Sunday, 27 April, 3:30pm	Artie Gofton Oval	TBA
Souths Bulls	32 – 16	Burdekin Roosters	Sunday, 27 April, 3:30pm	Ross River Redskin's Grounds	TBA
Round 4
North Thuringowa Devils	40 – 4	Burdekin Roosters	Saturday, 10 May, 4:30pm	Peggy Banfield Park	TBA
Charters Towers Miners	20 – 16	Western Lions	Sunday, 11 May, 3:30pm	Bill Lewis Oval	TBA
Souths Bulls	50 – 18	Townsville Brothers Leprechauns	Sunday, 11 May, 3:30pm	Ross River Redskin's Grounds	TBA
Centrals ASA Tigers	12 – 34	Herbert River Crushers	Sunday, 11 May, 3:30pm	Townsville Sports Reserve	TBA
Round 5
Townsville Brothers Leprechauns	30 – 0	Centrals ASA Tigers	Friday, 16 May, 7:30pm	Jack Manski Oval	TBA
Herbert River Crushers	14 – 38	Souths Bulls	Saturday, 17 May, 4:30pm	Artie Gofton Oval	TBA
North Thuringowa Devils	24 – 22	Charters Towers Miners	Saturday, 17 May, 4:30pm	Peggy Banfield Park	TBA
Burdekin Roosters	BYE	Western Lions
Round 6
North Thuringowa Devils	8 – 34	Souths Bulls	Friday, 23 May, 6:00pm	Peggy Banfield Park	TBA
Burdekin Roosters	38 – 14	Western Lions	Saturday, 24 May, 4:30pm	Rugby Park	TBA
Townsville Brothers Leprechauns	28 – 24	Herbert River Crushers	Saturday, 24 May, 4:30pm	Jack Manski Oval	TBA
Charters Towers Miners	0 – 12	Centrals ASA Tigers	Saturday, 24 May, 6:30pm	Bill Lewis Oval	TBA
Round 7
Charters Towers Miners	24 – 18	Herbert River Crushers	Saturday, 31 May, 4:30pm	Bill Lewis Oval	TBA
North Thuringowa Devils	32 – 34	Western Lions	Saturday, 31 May, 6:30pm	Peggy Banfield Park	TBA
Burdekin Roosters	36 – 24	Centrals ASA Tigers	Sunday, 1 June, 3:30pm	Rugby Park	TBA
Townsville Brothers Leprechauns	BYE	Souths Bulls
Round 8
Burdekin Roosters	38 – 18	Charters Towers Miners	Saturday, 7 June, 4:30pm	Rugby Park	TBA
Centrals ASA Tigers	30 – 6	North Thuringowa Devils	Saturday, 7 June, 4:30pm	Townsville Sports Reserve	TBA
Souths Bulls	30 – 24	Townsville Brothers Leprechauns	Sunday, 8 June, 12:30pm	Ross River Redskin's Grounds	TBA
Western Lions	14 – 30	Herbert River Crushers	Sunday, 8 June, 3:30pm	Neil Stewart Park	TBA
Round 9
Herbert River Crushers	12 – 24	Townsville Brothers Leprechauns	Friday, 13 June, 7:30pm	Artie Gofton Oval	TBA
Charters Towers Miners	38 – 24	Western Lions	Saturday, 14 June, 4:30pm	Bill Lewis Oval	TBA
North Thuringowa Devils	8 – 44	Souths Bulls	Saturday, 14 June, 6:30pm	Peggy Banfield Park	TBA
Centrals ASA Tigers	24 – 14	Burdekin Roosters	Saturday, 14 June, 6:30pm	Townsville Sports Reserve	TBA
Round 10
Townsville Brothers Leprechauns	44 – 18	North Thuringowa Devils	Sunday, 22 June, 3:00pm	Jack Manski Oval	TBA
Souths Bulls	16 – 10	Charters Towers Miners	Sunday, 22 June, 3:00pm	Ross River Redskin's Grounds	TBA
Western Lions	22 – 18	Centrals ASA Tigers	Sunday, 22 June, 4:30pm	Neil Stewart Park	TBA
Burdekin Roosters	BYE	Herbert River Crushers
Round 11
Herbert River Crushers	14 – 12	Burdekin Roosters	Saturday, 28 June, 4:30pm	Artie Gofton Oval	TBA
Charters Towers Miners	14 – 40	Townsville Brothers Leprechauns	Saturday, 28 June, 6:30pm	Bill Lewis Oval	TBA
Western Lions	24 – 24	North Thuringowa Devils	Sunday, 29 June, 3:30pm	Neil Stewart Park	TBA
Centrals ASA Tigers	16 – 30	Souths Bulls	Sunday, 29 June, 3:30pm	Townsville Sports Reserve	TBA
Round 12
Herbert River Crushers	16 – 14	Charters Towers Miners	Saturday, 12 July, 4:30pm	Artie Gofton Oval	TBA
Burdekin Roosters	10 – 64	Souths Bulls	Sunday, 13 July, 3:30pm	Rugby Park	TBA
Townsville Brothers Leprechauns	28 – 16	Centrals ASA Tigers	Sunday, 13 July, 3:30pm	Jack Manski Oval	TBA
Western Lions	28 – 16	North Thuringowa Devils	Sunday, 13 July, 3:30pm	Neil Stewart Park	TBA
Round 13
Burdekin Roosters	28 – 30	Townsville Brothers Leprechauns	Saturday, 19 July, 4:30pm	Rugby Park	TBA
Herbert River Crushers	28 – 8	Centrals ASA Tigers	Saturday, 19 July, 4:30pm	Artie Gofton Oval	TBA
Charters Towers Miners	18 – 34	Souths Bulls	Saturday, 19 July, 6:30pm	Bill Lewis Oval	TBA
Western Lions	BYE	North Thuringowa Devils
Round 14
Herbert River Crushers	18 – 14	Burdekin Roosters	Saturday, 26 July, 4:30pm	Artie Gofton Oval	TBA
Western Lions	4 – 44	Souths Bulls	Saturday, 26 July, 4:30pm	Neil Stewart Park	TBA
Charters Towers Miners	24 – 30	North Thuringowa Devils	Saturday, 26 July, 6:30pm	Bill Lewis Oval	TBA
Centrals ASA Tigers	6 – 32	Townsville Brothers Leprechauns	Sunday, 27 July, 3:30pm	Townsville Sports Reserve	TBA
Round 15
Charters Towers Miners	48 – 14	Burdekin Roosters	Saturday, 2 August, 4:30pm	Bill Lewis Oval	TBA
Western Lions	20 – 20	Townsville Brothers Leprechauns	Saturday, 2 August, 4:30pm	Neil Stewart Park	TBA
Souths Bulls	52 – 20	North Thuringowa Devils	Saturday, 2 August, 6:30pm	Ross River Redskin's Grounds	TBA
Herbert River Crushers	BYE	Centrals ASA Tigers
Round 16
Townsville Brothers Leprechauns	10 – 34	Souths Bulls	Friday, 8 August, 7:30pm	Jack Manski Oval	TBA
Burdekin Roosters	28 – 24	Charters Towers Miners	Saturday, 9 August, 4:30pm	Rugby Park	TBA
North Thuringowa Devils	20 – 30	Centrals ASA Tigers	Saturday, 9 August, 6:30pm	Peggy Banfield Park	TBA
Herbert River Crushers	14 – 44	Western Lions	Sunday, 10 August, 3:30pm	Peggy Banfield Park	TBA
Round 17
Townsville Brothers Leprechauns	22 – 18	Charters Towers Miners	Saturday, 16 August, 4:30pm	Jack Manski Oval	TBA
Western Lions	32 – 22	Burdekin Roosters	Saturday, 16 August, 4:30pm	Neil Stewart Park	TBA
North Thuringowa Devils	26 – 24	Herbert River Crushers	Saturday, 16 August, 4:30pm	Peggy Banfield Park	TBA
Souths Bulls	32 – 18	Centrals ASA Tigers	Saturday, 16 August, 6:30pm	Ross River Redskin's Grounds	TBA
Round 18
Burdekin Roosters	24 – 18	Herbert River Crushers	Saturday, 23 August, 4:30pm	Rugby Park	TBA
North Thuringowa Devils	32 – 16	Townsville Brothers Leprechauns	Saturday, 23 August, 4:30pm	Peggy Banfield Park	TBA
Centrals ASA Tigers	20 – 22	Western Lions	Saturday, 23 August, 6:30pm	Townsville Sports Reserve	TBA
Charters Towers Miners	BYE	Souths Bulls
Finals Series
Major & Minor Semi-Finals
Herbert River Crushers	24 – 42	Western Lions	Sunday, 31 August, 2:30pm	Jack Manski Oval	TBA
Souths Bulls	32 – 10	Townsville Brothers Leprechauns	Sunday, 31 August, 4:00pm	Jack Manski Oval	TBA
Preliminary Final
Townsville Brothers Leprechauns	18 – 8	Western Lions	Sunday, 7 September, 3:45pm	Jack Manski Oval	TBA
Grand Final
Souths Bulls	V	Townsville Brothers Leprechauns	Sunday, 14 September, 3:45pm	Jack Manski Oval	TBA

==== Grand Final ====
Semi-Finals
1	Souths	32
2	Townsville Brothers	10
3	Herbert River	24
4	Western	42

Preliminary Final
2	Townsville Brothers	18
4	Western	8

Grand Final
1	Souths
2	Townsville Brothers

2025 RLTD Premiership Grand Final

Sunday, 14 September 2025
3:45pm

Souths Bulls	v	Townsville Brothers Leprechauns

Jack Manski Oval, Townsville

== Central Division ==
=== Bundaberg Premiership ===
The Bundaberg Premiership (Named the 4BU/HITZ FM A Grade for sponsorship reasons) is a Bundaberg based men's first grade rugby league competition that features teams from the QRL Central Division. This competition feeds into the Central Queensland Capras Queensland Cup team.

==== Teams ====
The lineup for 2025 will remain the same as 2024.

Colours	Club	QLD Cup Affiliate	Home ground(s)	Head coach
	Bundaberg Past Brothers	Central Queensland Capras	Salter Oval	TBA
	Eastern Suburbs Magpies	Central Queensland Capras	Salter Oval	TBA
	Hervey Bay Seagulls	Central Queensland Capras	Stafford Park	TBA
	Maryborough Wallaroos	Central Queensland Capras	Eskdale Park	TBA
	Waves Tigers	Central Queensland Capras	Salter Oval	TBA
	Western Suburbs Panthers	Central Queensland Capras	Salter Oval	TBA

==== Ladder ====
Pos	Team	Pld	W	D	L	B	PF	PA	PD	Pts	Qualification
1	Waves Tigers	15	13	1	1	0	596	214	+382	27	Minor Premiers & Major Semi-Final
2	Bundaberg Past Brothers	15	12	1	2	0	492	260	+232	25	Qualifying Final
3	Maryborough Wallaroos	15	6	1	8	0	356	366	–10	13	Qualifying Final
4	Hervey Bay Seagulls	15	6	1	8	0	352	420	–78	13	Elimination Final
5	Eastern Suburbs Magpies	15	5	0	10	0	400	462	–62	10	Elimination Final
6	Western Suburbs Panthers	15	1	0	14	0	202	676	-474	2	

Updated to match(es) played on 1 September. Source:
Rules for classification: 1) points; 2) point difference; 3) points scored

===== Ladder progression =====
- Numbers highlighted in green indicate that the team finished the round inside the top 5.
- Numbers highlighted in blue indicates the team finished first on the ladder in that round.
- Numbers highlighted in red indicates the team finished last place on the ladder in that round.
- Underlined numbers indicate that the team had a bye during that round.

Pos	Team	1	2	3	4	5	6	7	8	9	10	11	12	13	14	15
1	Waves Tigers	2	3	5	7	9	11	13	15	17	19	21	21	23	25	27
2	Bundaberg Past Brothers	2	3	5	7	9	9	9	11	13	15	17	19	21	23	25
3	Maryborough Wallaroos	2	4	4	4	6	6	7	7	7	9	9	11	11	11	13
4	Hervey Bay Seagulls	0	0	2	2	2	4	5	7	9	9	9	9	11	13	13
5	Eastern Suburbs Magpies	0	2	2	4	4	6	6	6	6	6	8	10	10	10	10
6	Western Suburbs Panthers	0	0	0	0	0	0	2	2	2	2	2	2	2	2	2

Season Results:

Home	Score	Away	Match Information
Home	Score	Away	Date and Time	Venue	Referee	Video
Round 1
Bundaberg Past Brothers	46 – 10	Hervey Bay Seagulls	Saturday, 5 April, 2:15pm	Salter Oval	TBA
Waves Tigers	62 – 10	Western Suburbs Panthers	Saturday, 5 April, 4:00pm	Salter Oval	TBA
Eastern Suburbs Magpies	16 – 36	Maryborough Wallaroos	Saturday, 5 April, 4:00pm	Salter Oval	TBA
Round 2
Western Suburbs Panthers	22 – 26	Eastern Suburbs Magpies	Saturday, 12 April, 4:15pm	Salter Oval	TBA
Maryborough Wallaroos	26 – 24	Hervey Bay Seagulls	Saturday, 12 April, 5:00pm	Eskdale Park	TBA
Bundaberg Past Brothers	16 – 16	Waves Tigers	Saturday, 12 April, 6:00pm	Salter Oval	TBA
Round 3 (ANZAC Round)
Hervey Bay Seagulls	22 – 18	Western Suburbs Panthers	Saturday, 26 April, 3:00pm	Stafford Park	TBA
Bundaberg Past Brothers	30 – 14	Maryborough Wallaroos	Saturday, 26 April, 4:15pm	Salter Oval	TBA
Eastern Suburbs Magpies	12 – 34	Waves Tigers	Saturday, 26 April, 6:00pm	Salter Oval	TBA
Round 4
Maryborough Wallaroos	18 – 20	Waves Tigers	Saturday, 10 May, 4:00pm	Eskdale Park	TBA
Eastern Suburbs Magpies	32 – 18	Hervey Bay Seagulls	Saturday, 10 May, 4:15pm	Salter Oval	TBA
Western Suburbs Panthers	26 – 32	Bundaberg Past Brothers	Saturday, 10 May, 6:00pm	Salter Oval	TBA
Round 5
Hervey Bay Seagulls	24 – 34	Waves Tigers	Saturday, 17 May, 4:00pm	Stafford Park	TBA
Western Suburbs Panthers	20 – 32	Maryborough Wallaroos	Saturday, 17 May, 4:15pm	Salter Oval	TBA
Eastern Suburbs Magpies	18 – 32	Bundaberg Past Brothers	Saturday, 17 May, 6:00pm	Salter Oval	TBA
Round 6
Eastern Suburbs Magpies	44 – 28	Maryborough Wallaroos	Saturday, 24 May, 3:45pm	Salter Oval	TBA
Hervey Bay Seagulls	44 – 18	Bundaberg Past Brothers	Saturday, 24 May, 5:00pm	Stafford Park	TBA
Waves Tigers	32 – 4	Western Suburbs Panthers	Saturday, 24 May, 5:30pm	Salter Oval	TBA
Round 7
Western Suburbs Panthers	26 – 24	Eastern Suburbs Magpies	Saturday, 31 May, 3:45pm	Salter Oval	TBA
Maryborough Wallaroos	20 – 20	Hervey Bay Seagulls	Saturday, 31 May, 5:00pm	Eskdale Park	TBA
Bundaberg Past Brothers	6 – 28	Waves Tigers	Saturday, 31 May, 5:30pm	Salter Oval	TBA
Round 8
Western Suburbs Panthers	30 – 44	Hervey Bay Seagulls	Saturday, 14 June, 3:45pm	Salter Oval	TBA
Maryborough Wallaroos	20 – 34	Bundaberg Past Brothers	Saturday, 14 June, 5:00pm	Eskdale Park	TBA
Eastern Suburbs Magpies	16 – 40	Waves Tigers	Saturday, 14 June, 5:30pm	Salter Oval	TBA
Round 9
Waves Tigers	40 – 22	Maryborough Wallaroos	Saturday, 21 June, 3:45pm	Salter Oval	TBA
Hervey Bay Seagulls	24 – 22	Eastern Suburbs Magpies	Saturday, 21 June, 5:00pm	Stafford Park	TBA
Western Suburbs Panthers	10 – 44	Bundaberg Past Brothers	Saturday, 21 June, 5:30pm	Salter Oval	TBA
Round 10
Bundaberg Past Brothers	52 – 24	Eastern Suburbs Magpies	Saturday, 28 June, 3:00pm	Brothers Sports Ground	TBA
Waves Tigers	50 – 10	Hervey Bay Seagulls	Saturday, 28 June, 3:00pm	Salter Oval	TBA
Western Suburbs Panthers	16 – 24	Maryborough Wallaroos	Saturday, 28 June, 4:30pm	Salter Oval	TBA
Round 11
Western Suburbs Panthers	4 – 102	Waves Tigers	Saturday, 5 July, 3:00pm	Eskdale Park	TBA
Maryborough Wallaroos	20 – 26	Eastern Suburbs Magpies	Saturday, 5 July, 3:00pm	Salter Oval	TBA
Bundaberg Past Brothers	20* – 0	Hervey Bay Seagulls	N/A
Round 12
Bundaberg Past Brothers	30 – 22	Waves Tigers	Saturday, 12 July, 3:45pm	Salter Oval	TBA
Hervey Bay Seagulls	18 – 26	Maryborough Wallaroos	Saturday, 12 July, 5:00pm	Stafford Park	TBA
Western Suburbs Panthers	4 – 86	Eastern Suburbs Magpies	Saturday, 12 July, 5:30pm	Salter Oval	TBA
Round 13
Western Suburbs Panthers	12 – 50	Hervey Bay Seagulls	Saturday, 19 July, 3:45pm	Salter Oval	TBA
Maryborough Wallaroos	18 – 30	Bundaberg Past Brothers	Saturday, 19 July, 5:00pm	Eskdale Park	TBA
Eastern Suburbs Magpies	20 – 46	Waves Tigers	Saturday, 19 July, 5:30pm	Salter Oval	TBA
Round 14
Eastern Suburbs Magpies	24 – 28	Hervey Bay Seagulls	Saturday, 26 July, 3:45pm	Salter Oval	TBA
Maryborough Wallaroos	6 – 28	Waves Tigers	Saturday, 26 July, 5:00pm	Eskdale Park	TBA
Western Suburbs Panthers	0 – 50	Bundaberg Past Brothers	Saturday, 26 July, 5:30pm	Salter Oval	TBA
Round 15
Waves Tigers	42 – 16	Hervey Bay Seagulls	Saturday, 2 August, 3:45pm	Salter Oval	TBA
Maryborough Wallaroos	46 – 0	Western Suburbs Panthers	Saturday, 2 August 5:30pm	Eskdale Park	TBA
Eastern Suburbs Magpies	10 – 52	Bundaberg Past Brothers	Saturday, 2 August, 5:30pm	Salter Oval	TBA
Finals Series
Qualifying & Elimination Finals
Hervey Bay Seagulls	16 – 30	Eastern Suburbs Magpies	Saturday, 9 August, 3:45pm	Salter Oval	TBA
Bundaberg Past Brothers	42 – 10	Maryborough Wallaroos	Saturday, 9 August, 5:30pm	Salter Oval	TBA
Major & Minor Semi-Finals
Maryborough Wallaroos	28 – 34	Eastern Suburbs Magpies	Saturday, 16 August, 4:15pm	Salter Oval	TBA
Waves Tigers	18 – 10	Bundaberg Past Brothers	Saturday, 16 August, 6:00pm	Salter Oval	TBA
Preliminary Final
Bundaberg Past Brothers	40 – 42	Eastern Suburbs Magpies	Saturday, 23 August, 6:00pm	Salter Oval	TBA
Grand Final
Waves Tigers	42 – 26	Eastern Suburbs Magpies	Saturday, 30 August, 6:00pm	Salter Oval	TBA

==== Grand Final ====
Qualifying & Elimination Finals
2	Bundaberg	42
3	Maryborough	10
4	Hervey Bay	16
5	Eastern Suburbs	30

Major Semi-Final
1	Waves	18
2	Bundaberg	10
Minor Semi-Final
3	Maryborough	28
5	Eastern Suburbs	34

Preliminary Final
2	Bundaberg	40
5	Eastern Suburbs	42

Grand Final
1	Waves	42
5	Eastern Suburbs	26

2025 Bundaberg Premiership Grand Final

Saturday, 30 August, 2025
6:00pm

Waves Tigers	42 – 26	Eastern Suburbs Magpies
Tries: Parkka Perrotta-Dowling 3 Kian Young 1 N/A 1 Ponipate Wailevu 1 Daniel Cavanagh; N/A 1 Goals: Zander Kerr 3/7; Bradley Clarke 1/1; Reece Maughan 1/1		Tries: 1 Marcus Tanner; 1 Shaun Ezz; 1 Zachariah Ambertel; 1 Trent Seeds; 1 Alfred Norman; Goals: 3/5 Mitchell Butler

Salter Oval, Bundaberg

Team details
Waves		Position	Western Suburbs
Name	Number	Position	Number	Name
Bradley Clarke	1	Fullback	1	Marcus Tanner
Parkka Perrotta-Dowling	2	Wing	2	Zac Ambertel
Kean Young	3	Centre	3	Trent Seeds
Jensen Deamer	4	Centre	4	Blake O'Dwyer
Ponipate Wailevu	5	Wing	5	Alfred Norman
Reece Maughan	6	Five eighth	6	Thomas Cox
Samuel Tobin (c)	7	Half back	7	Andreas Nona
Harrison Kuorikoski	8	Prop forward	8	Joshua Tanner
Kynan Hard	9	Hooker	9	Lukas Blair
Kiya Schnabel	10	Prop forward	10	Junior Tuitoma
Lachlan Patterson	11	Second row	11	Kyle O'Dwyer (c)
Daniel Cavanagh	12	Second row	12	Tyrell Howard
Zander Kerr	13	Lock forward	13	Mitchell Butler
Levi Monckton	14	Interchange	14	Dylan Zelinski
Flynn Purkis	15	Interchange	15	Jayden Moran
Riley Morcom	16	Interchange	16	Joseph Greer
Oscar Dotter	17	Interchange	17	Shaun Ezzy
Antonio Kaufusi		Coach		David Pearce

=== Rockhampton Premiership ===
The Rockhampton Premiership is a Rockhampton based men's first grade rugby league competition that features teams from the QRL Central Division. This competition feeds into the Central Queensland Capras Queensland Cup team.

==== Teams ====
The lineup for 2025.

Colours	Club	QLD Cup Affiliate	Home ground(s)	Head coach
	Emu Park Emus	Central Queensland Capras	Hartley Street Sports Complex	TBA
	Gladstone Brothers Leprechauns	Central Queensland Capras	Marley Brown Oval	TBA
	Gladstone Valleys Diehards	Central Queensland Capras	Valleys Grounds	TBA
	Norths Chargers	Central Queensland Capras	Gymnasium Park	TBA
	Rockhampton Brothers Leprechauns	Central Queensland Capras	Victoria Park	TBA
	Tannum Sands Seagulls	Central Queensland Capras	Dennis Park	TBA
	Yeppoon Seagulls	Central Queensland Capras	Webb Park	TBA

==== Ladder ====
Pos	Team	Pld	W	D	L	B	PF	PA	PD	Pts	Qualification
1	Rockhampton Brothers Leprechauns	14	12	1	1	0	440	181	+259	25	Minor Premiers & Major Semi-Final
2	Emu Park Emus	14	11	0	3	0	479	242	+237	22	Qualifying Final
3	Yeppoon Seagulls	14	10	0	4	0	502	208	+294	20	Qualifying Final
4	Norths Chargers	14	7	2	5	0	348	254	+94	16	Elimination Final
5	Gladstone Valleys Diehards	14	6	2	6	0	386	294	+92	14	Elimination Final
6	Gladstone Brothers Leprechauns	14	4	2	8	0	240	396	-156	10	
7	Tannum Sands Seagulls	14	2	0	12	0	176	402	-236	4	
8	Fitzroy-Gracemere Sharks	14	0	1	13	0	68	662	-594	1	

Updated to match(es) played on 1 September. Source:
Rules for classification: 1) points; 2) point difference; 3) points scored

===== Ladder progression =====
- Numbers highlighted in green indicate that the team finished the round inside the top 5.
- Numbers highlighted in blue indicates the team finished first on the ladder in that round.
- Numbers highlighted in red indicates the team finished last place on the ladder in that round.
- Underlined numbers indicate that the team had a bye during that round.

Pos	Team	1	2	3	4	5	6	7	8	9	10	11	12	13	14
1	Rockhampton Brothers Leprechauns	1	3	5	7	9	11	13	15	17	19	21	23	23	25
2	Emu Park Emus	2	4	4	6	8	10	10	12	14	16	16	18	20	22
3	Yeppoon Seagulls	0	2	4	6	6	6	8	10	12	14	16	18	20	20
4	Norths Chargers	1	1	3	5	7	7	9	11	11	12	14	14	14	16
5	Gladstone Valleys Diehards	2	2	4	4	5	7	7	7	7	8	10	12	14	14
6	Gladstone Brothers Leprechauns	1	1	1	1	2	4	6	6	6	6	6	6	8	10
7	Tannum Sands Seagulls	0	2	2	2	2	2	2	2	4	4	4	4	4	4
8	Fitzroy-Gracemere Sharks	1	1	1	1	1	1	1	1	1	1	1	1	1	1

Season Results:

Home	Score	Away	Match Information
Home	Score	Away	Date and Time	Venue	Referee	Video
Round 1
Gladstone Brothers Leprechauns	0 – 0*	Rockhampton Brothers Leprechauns	Saturday, 5 April, 7:30pm	Marley Brown Oval	TBA
Emu Park Emus	32 – 6	Tannum Sands Seagulls	Saturday, 5 April, 7:30pm	Hartley Street Sports Complex	TBA
Fitzroy-Gracemere Sharks	0 – 0*	Norths Chargers	Saturday, 5 April, 7:30pm	Saleyards Park	TBA
Yeppoon Seagulls	12 – 28	Gladstone Valleys Diehards	Saturday, 5 April, 7:30pm	Webb Park	TBA
Round 2
Gladstone Brothers Leprechauns	12 – 40	Yeppoon Seagulls	Saturday, 12 April, 6:30pm	Blain Park	TBA
Tannum Sands Seagulls	38 – 20	Fitzroy-Gracemere Sharks	Saturday, 12 April, 6:30pm	Dennis Park	TBA
Emu Park Emus	26 – 22	Gladstone Valleys Diehards	Sunday, 13 April, 3:00pm	Hartley Street Sports Complex	TBA
Rockhampton Brothers Leprechauns	30 – 24	Norths Chargers	Sunday, 13 April, 3:00pm	Victoria Park	TBA
Round 3 (ANZAC Round)
Gladstone Brothers Leprechauns	16 – 30	Norths Chargers	Saturday, 26 April, 6:30pm	Blain Park	TBA
Emu Park Emus	29 – 34	Rockhampton Brothers Leprechauns	Saturday, 26 April, 6:30pm	Hartley Street Sports Complex	TBA
Yeppoon Seagulls	50 – 16	Fitzroy-Gracemere Sharks	Saturday, 26 April, 6:30pm	Webb Park	TBA
Gladstone Valleys Diehards	44 – 14	Tannum Sands Seagulls	Sunday, 27 April, 3:00pm	Valleys Grounds	TBA
Round 4
Norths Chargers	34 – 8	Gladstone Valleys Diehards	Saturday, 10 May, 3:00pm	Gymnasium Park	TBA
Tannum Sands Seagulls	14 – 52	Yeppoon Seagulls	Saturday, 10 May, 6:30pm	Dennis Park	TBA
Gladstone Brothers Leprechauns	18 – 28	Emu Park Emus	Saturday, 10 May, 6:30pm	Marley Brown Oval	TBA
Fitzroy-Gracemere Sharks	6 – 80	Rockhampton Brothers Leprechauns	Saturday, 10 May, 6:30pm	Saleyards Park	TBA
Round 5
Gladstone Brothers Leprechauns	20 – 20	Gladstone Valleys Diehards	Saturday, 17 May, 6:30pm	Blain Park	TBA
Fitzroy-Gracemere Sharks	14 – 72	Emu Park Emus	Sunday, 18 May, 3:00pm	Saleyards Park	TBA
Yeppoon Seagulls	10 – 24	Norths Chargers	Sunday, 18 May, 3:00pm	Webb Park	TBA
Rockhampton Brothers Leprechauns	0* – 0	Tannum Sands Seagulls	N/A
Round 6
Rockhampton Brothers Leprechauns	26 – 14	Yeppoon Seagulls	Saturday, 24 May, 6:30pm	Victoria Park	TBA
Tannum Sands Seagulls	0 – 10	Gladstone Brothers Leprechauns	Saturday, 24 May, 6:30pm	Dennis Park	TBA
Emu Park Emus	36 – 22	Norths Chargers	Sunday, 25 May, 3:00pm	Hartley Street Sports Complex	TBA
Fitzroy-Gracemere Sharks	0 – 52	Gladstone Valleys Diehards	Sunday, 25 May, 3:00pm	Saleyards Park	TBA
Round 7
Yeppoon Seagulls	24 – 0	Emu Park Emus	Saturday, 31 May, 6:30pm	Webb Park	TBA
Gladstone Valleys Diehards	8 – 22	Rockhampton Brothers Leprechauns	Sunday, 1 June, 3:00pm	Valleys Grounds	TBA
Norths Chargers	0* – 0	Tannum Sands Seagulls	N/A
Gladstone Brothers Leprechauns	0* – 0	Fitzroy-Gracemere Sharks	N/A
Round 8
Tannum Sands Seagulls	4 – 24	Emu Park Emus	Saturday, 14 June, 6:30pm	Dennis Park	TBA
Rockhampton Brothers Leprechauns	64 – 20	Gladstone Brothers Leprechauns	Saturday, 14 June, 6:30pm	Victoria Park	TBA
Norths Chargers	46 – 0	Fitzroy-Gracemere Sharks	Sunday, 15 June, 3:00pm	Gymnasium Park	TBA
Gladstone Valleys Diehards	18 – 42	Yeppoon Seagulls	Sunday, 15 June, 3:00pm	Valleys Grounds	TBA
Round 9
Norths Chargers	20 – 34	Rockhampton Brothers Leprechauns	Saturday, 21 June, 6:30pm	Gymnasium Park	TBA
Fitzroy-Gracemere Sharks	12 – 58	Tannum Sands Seagulls	Saturday, 21 June, 6:30pm	Saleyards Park	TBA
Yeppoon Seagulls	58 – 10	Gladstone Brothers Leprechauns	Saturday, 21 June, 6:30pm	Webb Park	TBA
Gladstone Valleys Diehards	28 – 32	Emu Park Emus	Sunday, 22 June, 3:00pm	Valleys Grounds	TBA
Round 10
Gladstone Valleys Diehards	28 – 28	Norths Chargers	Saturday, 28 June, 6:30pm	Marley Brown Oval	TBA
Emu Park Emus	74 – 0	Gladstone Brothers Leprechauns	Saturday, 28 June, 6:30pm	Hartley Street Sports Complex	TBA
Yeppoon Seagulls	48 – 12	Tannum Sands Seagulls	Saturday, 28 June, 6:30pm	Webb Park	TBA
Rockhampton Brothers Leprechauns	0* – 0	Fitzroy-Gracemere Sharks	N/A
Round 11
Norths Chargers	46 – 8	Gladstone Brothers Leprechauns	Saturday, 5 July, 6:30pm	Gymnasium Park	TBA
Tannum Sands Seagulls	6 – 20	Gladstone Valleys Diehards	Saturday, 5 July, 6:30pm	Marley Brown Oval	TBA
Fitzroy-Gracemere Sharks	0 – 70	Yeppoon Seagulls	Saturday, 5 July, 6:30pm	Saleyards Park	TBA
Rockhampton Brothers Leprechauns	44 – 6	Emu Park Emus	Saturday, 5 July, 6:30pm	Victoria Park	TBA
Round 12
Tannum Sands Seagulls	8 – 48	Rockhampton Brothers Leprechauns	Saturday, 12 July, 6:30pm	Dennis Park	TBA
Norths Chargers	8 – 50	Yeppoon Seagulls	Sunday, 13 July, 3:00pm	Gymnasium Park	TBA
Emu Park Emus	70 – 0	Fitzroy-Gracemere Sharks	Sunday, 13 July, 3:00pm	Hartley Street Sports Complex	TBA
Gladstone Valleys Diehards	24 – 20	Gladstone Brothers Leprechauns	Sunday, 13 July, 3:00pm	Valleys Grounds	TBA
Round 13
Yeppoon Seagulls	22 – 20	Rockhampton Brothers Leprechauns	Saturday, 19 July, 6:30pm	Webb Park	TBA
Gladstone Valleys Diehards	62 – 0	Fitzroy-Gracemere Sharks	Saturday, 19 July, 6:30pm	Valleys Grounds	TBA
Gladstone Brothers Leprechauns	42 – 12	Tannum Sands Seagulls	Saturday, 19 July, 6:30pm	Blain Park	TBA
Norths Chargers	16 – 30	Emu Park Emus	Sunday, 20 July, 3:00pm	Gymnasium Park	TBA
Round 14
Tannum Sands Seagulls	4 – 50	Norths Chargers	Saturday, 26 July, 6:30pm	Dennis Park	TBA
Emu Park Emus	20 – 10	Yeppoon Seagulls	Saturday, 26 July, 6:30pm	Hartley Street Sports Complex	TBA
Fitzroy-Gracemere Sharks	0 – 64	Gladstone Brothers Leprechauns	Saturday, 26 July, 6:30pm	Saleyards Park	TBA
Rockhampton Brothers Leprechauns	38 – 24	Gladstone Valleys Diehards	Saturday, 26 July, 6:30pm	Victoria Park	TBA
Finals Series
Qualifying & Elimination Finals
Norths Chargers	34 – 12	Gladstone Valleys Diehards	Saturday, 2 August, 6:30pm	Marley Brown Oval	TBA
Emu Park Emus	26 – 20	Yeppoon Seagulls	Saturday, 2 August, 6:30pm	Webb Park	TBA
Major & Minor Semi-Finals
Yeppoon Seagulls	40 – 6	Norths Chargers	Sunday, 10 August, 1:45pm	Victoria Park	TBA
Rockhampton Brothers Leprechauns	20 – 32	Emu Park Emus	Sunday, 10 August, 3:00pm	Victoria Park	TBA
Preliminary Final
Rockhampton Brothers Leprechauns	18 – 30	Yeppoon Seagulls	Sunday, 17 August, 3:00pm	Hartley Street Sports Complex	TBA
Grand Final
Emu Park Emus	16 – 32	Yeppoon Seagulls	Saturday, 23 August, 6:00pm	Rugby Park	Haydn Scott

==== Grand Final ====
Qualifying & Elimination Finals
2	Emu Park	26
3	Yeppoon	20
4	Norths	34
5	Gladstone Valleys	12

Major Semi-Final
1	Rockhampton Brothers	20
2	Emu Park	32
Minor Semi-Final
3	Yeppoon	40
4	Norths	6

Preliminary Final
1	Rockhampton Brothers	18
3	Yeppoon	30

Grand Final
2	Emu Park	16
3	Yeppoon	32

2025 Rockhampton Premiership Grand Final

Saturday, 23 August 2025
6:00pm

Emu Park Emus	16 – 32	Yeppoon Seagulls
Tries: Tristan Butcher (11') 1 Troy Richardson (20') 1 Tiko Hooper (77') 1 Goals: Callum Denman 2/3 (21', 78')	1st: 10 – 12; 2nd: 6 – 20	Tries: 2 (62', 71') Tane Kiriona; 1 (33') George Grant; 1 (36') Zac Sainsbury; 1 (45') Jamie Minto; 1 (75') Bacho Salam; Goals: 4/6 Jackson Harris (34', 37', 72', 76')

Rugby Park, Rockhampton
Referee: Haydn Scott
Touch judges: Matt Sharp & Jay Hardie

Team details
Emu Park		Position	Yeppoon
Name	Number	Position	Number	Name
Tristan Butcher	1	Fullback	1	Raymond Ebsworth
Jaiden Mann	2	Wing	2	Banjo Walker
Trent Richardson	3	Centre	3	Bacho Salam
Jarvis Wedel	4	Centre	4	Jesse Johnson
Daniel Pam	5	Wing	5	Jamie Minto
Noah Ryan	6	Five eighth	6	Jackson Harris
Callum Denman	7	Half back	7	Zac Sainsbury
Jake Barham	8	Prop forward	8	Trent White
Troy Richardson	9	Hooker	9	Quinn Stover
Richie Akuhata-Brown	10	Prop forward	10	Tane Kiriona
Jake Lawton	11	Second row	11	Max Ward
Tiko Hooper (c)	12	Second row	12	Mathew Groves
Kealhan O'Brien	13	Lock forward	13	Sam Holzheimer (c)
Harry Barham	14	Interchange	14	George Grant
Harrison Hill	15	Interchange	15	Jace O'Neill
Rahkeem Auda	16	Interchange	16	Rhys Stafford
Samuel Yegip	17	Interchange	17	Ethan Jackson
		Concussion substitute	18	Hayden Doyle
Tiko Hooper		Coach		Shaun Goode

=== Roma Premiership ===
The Roma Premiership (Named the RDRL A Grade) is a Roma based men's first grade rugby league competition that features teams from the QRL Central Division. This competition feeds into the Western Clydesdales Queensland Cup team.

==== Teams ====
The lineup for 2025 is currently unconfirmed. Currently listed are teams that competed in 2024.

Colours	Club	QLD Cup Affiliate	Home ground(s)	Head coach
	Chinchilla Bulldogs	Western Clydesdales	Bulldog Park	TBA
	Roma Cities Gladiators	Western Clydesdales	Arthur Beetson Oval	TBA
	Miles Devils	Western Clydesdales	Centenary Oval	TBA
	Mitchell Magpies	Western Clydesdales	Mitchell RSL Sporting Complex	TBA
	St George Dragons	Western Clydesdales	Rowden Park	TBA
	Taroom-Wandoan Battlers	Western Clydesdales	Lindsay Williams Oval, Ross Bourke Park	TBA
	Wallumbilla-Surat Red Bulls	Western Clydesdales	Wallumbilla Football Ground, Surat Recreation Ground	TBA

==== Ladder ====
Pos	Team	Pld	W	D	L	B	PF	PA	PD	Pts	Qualification
1	Roma Cities Gladiators	14	12	0	2	0	396	198	+198	48	Minor Premiers & Major Semi-Final
2	St George Dragons	14	7	1	6	0	326	304	+22	30	Major Semi-Final
3	Jandowae Fishhooks	14	7	1	6	0	290	278	+12	30	Minor Semi-Final
4	Wallumbilla-Surat Red Bulls	14	7	0	7	0	338	266	+72	28	Minor Semi-Final
5	Taroom-Wandoan Battlers	14	6	0	8	0	331	368	–37	24	
6	Chinchilla Bulldogs	14	6	0	8	0	281	352	–71	24	
7	Mitchell Magpies	14	5	0	9	0	290	330	–40	20	
8	Miles Devils	14	5	0	9	0	288	444	-156	20	

Updated to match(es) played on 1 September. Source:
Rules for classification: 1) points; 2) point difference; 3) points scored

===== Ladder progression =====
- Numbers highlighted in green indicate that the team finished the round inside the top 4.
- Numbers highlighted in blue indicates the team finished first on the ladder in that round.
- Numbers highlighted in red indicates the team finished last place on the ladder in that round.
- Underlined numbers indicate that the team had a bye during that round.

Pos	Team	1	2	3	4	5	6	7	8	9	10	11	12	13	14
1	Roma Cities Gladiators	4	8	12	16	16	20	24	28	32	32	36	40	44	48
2	St George Dragons	0	4	4	4	4	8	12	14	14	18	18	22	26	30
3	Jandowae Fishhooks	4	8	12	16	16	16	16	18	22	22	22	26	26	30
4	Wallumbilla-Surat Red Bulls	0	0	4	8	8	12	12	12	12	12	16	20	24	28
5	Taroom-Wandoan Battlers	4	8	8	8	12	12	16	16	16	20	20	20	24	24
6	Chinchilla Bulldogs	4	4	8	8	12	12	12	16	20	20	24	24	24	24
7	Mitchell Magpies	0	0	0	0	4	4	8	12	12	16	20	20	20	20
8	Miles Devils	0	0	0	4	8	12	12	12	16	20	20	20	20	20

Season Results:

Home	Score	Away	Match Information
Home	Score	Away	Date and Time	Venue	Referee	Video
Round 1
St George Dragons	14 – 20	Jandowae Fishhooks	Saturday, 12 April, 2:30pm	Rowden Park	TBA
Chinchilla Bulldogs	26 – 12	Miles Devils	Saturday, 12 April, 4:30pm	Bulldog Park	TBA
Wallumbilla-Surat Red Bulls	10 – 16	Roma Cities Gladiators	Saturday, 12 April, 5:00pm	Wallumbilla Football Ground	TBA
Mitchell Magpies	16 – 17	Taroom-Wandoan Battlers	Sunday, 13 April, 3:00pm	Mitchell RSL Sporting Complex	TBA
Round 2 (ANZAC Round)
Mitchell Magpies	28 – 30	Roma Cities Gladiators	Friday, 25 April, 5:00pm	Mitchell RSL Sporting Complex	TBA
Jandowae Fishhooks	46 – 26	Wallumbilla-Surat Red Bulls	Saturday, 26 April, 6:00pm	Jandowae Footy Fields	TBA
Taroom-Wandoan Battlers	32 – 18	Chinchilla Bulldogs	Sunday, 27 April, 3:00pm	Ross Bourke Park	TBA
St George Dragons	30 – 20	Miles Devils	Sunday, 27 April, 3:00pm	Rowden Park	TBA
Round 3
Roma Cities Gladiators	40 – 22	St George Dragons	Sunday, 11 May, 3:00pm	Arthur Beetson Oval	TBA
Chinchilla Bulldogs	33 – 6	Mitchell Magpies	Sunday, 11 May, 3:00pm	Bulldog Park	TBA
Miles Devils	18 – 26	Jandowae Fishhooks	Sunday, 11 May, 3:00pm	Centenary Oval	TBA
Wallumbilla-Surat Red Bulls	38 – 26	Taroom-Wandoan Battlers	Sunday, 11 May, 3:00pm	Surat Recreation Ground	TBA
Round 4
Jandowae Fishhooks	18 – 4	Chinchilla Bulldogs	Sunday, 18 May, 3:00pm	Jandowae Footy Fields	TBA
Miles Devils	30 – 22	Mitchell Magpies	Sunday, 18 May, 3:00pm	Centenary Oval	TBA
Taroom-Wandoan Battlers	10 – 22	Roma Cities Gladiators	Sunday, 18 May, 3:00pm	Ross Bourke Park	TBA
St George Dragons	16 – 34	Wallumbilla-Surat Red Bulls	Sunday, 18 May, 3:00pm	Rowden Park	TBA
Round 5
Chinchilla Bulldogs	32 – 6	Roma Cities Gladiators	Sunday, 25 May, 3:00pm	Bulldog Park	TBA
Taroom-Wandoan Battlers	34 – 28	St George Dragons	Sunday, 25 May, 3:00pm	Lindsay Williams Oval	TBA
Mitchell Magpies	44 – 4	Jandowae Fishhooks	Sunday, 25 May, 3:00pm	Mitchell RSL Sporting Complex	TBA
Wallumbilla-Surat Red Bulls	24 – 28	Miles Devils	Sunday, 25 May, 3:00pm	Surat Recreation Ground	TBA
Round 6
Miles Devils	34 – 18	Taroom-Wandoan Battlers	Sunday, 1 June, 3:00pm	Centenary Oval	TBA
Jandowae Fishhooks	8 – 16	Roma Cities Gladiators	Sunday, 1 June, 3:00pm	Jandowae Footy Fields	TBA
St George Dragons	28 – 8	Mitchell Magpies	Sunday, 1 June, 3:00pm	Rowden Park	TBA
Wallumbilla-Surat Red Bulls	56 – 12	Chinchilla Bulldogs	Sunday, 1 June, 3:00pm	Wallumbilla Football Ground	TBA
Round 7
Roma Cities Gladiators	84 – 10	Miles Devils	Sunday, 15 June, 3:00pm	Arthur Beetson Oval	TBA
Chinchilla Bulldogs	22 – 32	St George Dragons	Sunday, 15 June, 3:00pm	Bulldog Park	TBA
Taroom-Wandoan Battlers	32 – 14	Jandowae Fishhooks	Sunday, 15 June, 3:00pm	Lindsay Williams Oval	TBA
Mitchell Magpies	0* – 0	Wallumbilla-Surat Red Bulls	N/A
Round 8
Roma Cities Gladiators	16 – 10	Wallumbilla-Surat Red Bulls	Sunday, 22 June, 3:00pm	Arthur Beetson Oval	TBA
Miles Devils	10 – 38	Chinchilla Bulldogs	Sunday, 22 June, 3:00pm	Centenary Oval	TBA
Jandowae Fishhooks	12 – 12	St George Dragons	Sunday, 22 June, 3:00pm	Jandowae Footy Fields	TBA
Taroom-Wandoan Battlers	24 – 42	Mitchell Magpies	Sunday, 22 June, 3:00pm	Ross Bourke Park	TBA
Round 9
Roma Cities Gladiators	38 – 8	Mitchell Magpies	Sunday, 29 June, 3:00pm	Arthur Beetson Oval	TBA
Chinchilla Bulldogs	34 – 12	Taroom-Wandoan Battlers	Sunday, 29 June, 3:00pm	Bulldog Park	TBA
Miles Devils	44 – 16	St George Dragons	Sunday, 29 June, 3:00pm	Centenary Oval	TBA
Wallumbilla-Surat Red Bulls	10 – 20	Jandowae Fishhooks	Sunday, 29 June, 3:00pm	Wallumbilla Football Ground	TBA
Round 10
Jandowae Fishhooks	18 – 20	Miles Devils	Sunday, 6 July, 3:00pm	Jandowae Footy Fields	TBA
Mitchell Magpies	40 – 14	Chinchilla Bulldogs	Sunday, 6 July, 3:00pm	Mitchell RSL Sporting Complex	TBA
Taroom-Wandoan Battlers	34 – 28	Wallumbilla-Surat Red Bulls	Sunday, 6 July, 3:00pm	Ross Bourke Park	TBA
St George Dragons	16 – 6	Roma Cities Gladiators	Sunday, 6 July, 3:00pm	Rowden Park	TBA
Round 11
Roma Cities Gladiators	18 – 10	Taroom-Wandoan Battlers	Sunday, 13 July, 3:00pm	Arthur Beetson Oval	TBA
Chinchilla Bulldogs	22 – 14	Jandowae Fishhooks	Sunday, 13 July, 3:00pm	Bulldog Park	TBA
Mitchell Magpies	48 – 14	Miles Devils	Sunday, 13 July, 3:00pm	Mitchell RSL Sporting Complex	TBA
Wallumbilla-Surat Red Bulls	28 – 20	St George Dragons	Sunday, 13 July, 3:00pm	Surat Recreation Ground	TBA
Round 12
Roma Cities Gladiators	52 – 16	Chinchilla Bulldogs	Sunday, 20 July, 3:00pm	Arthur Beetson Oval	TBA
Miles Devils	22 – 28	Wallumbilla-Surat Red Bulls	Sunday, 20 July, 3:00pm	Centenary Oval	TBA
Jandowae Fishhooks	46 – 12	Mitchell Magpies	Sunday, 20 July, 3:00pm	Jandowae Footy Fields	TBA
St George Dragons	24 – 20	Taroom-Wandoan Battlers	Sunday, 20 July, 3:00pm	Rowden Park	TBA
Round 13
Roma Cities Gladiators	26 – 6	Jandowae Fishhooks	Sunday, 27 July, 3:00pm	Arthur Beetson Oval	TBA
Chinchilla Bulldogs	6 – 16	Wallumbilla-Surat Red Bulls	Sunday, 27 July, 3:00pm	Bulldog Park	TBA
Mitchell Magpies	12 – 22	St George Dragons	Sunday, 27 July, 3:00pm	Mitchell RSL Sporting Complex	TBA
Taroom-Wandoan Battlers	40 – 14	Miles Devils	Sunday, 27 July, 3:00pm	Ross Bourke Park	TBA
Round 14
Miles Devils	12 – 26	Roma Cities Gladiators	Sunday, 3 August, 3:00pm	Centenary Oval	TBA
Jandowae Fishhooks	38 – 22	Taroom-Wandoan Battlers	Sunday, 3 August, 3:00pm	Jandowae Footy Fields	TBA
St George Dragons	46 – 4	Chinchilla Bulldogs	Sunday, 3 August, 3:00pm	Rowden Park	TBA
Wallumbilla-Surat Red Bulls	30 – 4	Mitchell Magpies	Sunday, 3 August, 3:00pm	Wallumbilla Football Ground	TBA
Finals Series
Major & Minor Semi-Finals
Jandowae Fishhooks	10 – 34	Wallumbilla-Surat Red Bulls	Saturday, 9 August, 4:15pm	Bassett Park	TBA
Roma Cities Gladiators	46 – 14	St George Dragons	Sunday, 10 August, 3:15pm	Bassett Park	TBA
Preliminary Final
St George Dragons	24 – 32	Wallumbilla-Surat Red Bulls	Sunday, 17 August, 3:00pm	Bassett Park	TBA
Grand Final
Roma Cities Gladiators	8 – 22	Wallumbilla-Surat Red Bulls	Sunday, 24 August, 3:00pm	Bassett Park	TBA

==== Grand Final ====
Semi-Finals
1	Roma Cities	46
2	St George	14
3	Jandowae	10
4	Wallumbilla-Surat	34

Preliminary Final
2	St George	24
4	Wallumbilla-Surat	32

Grand Final
1	Roma Cities	8
4	Wallumbilla-Surat	22

2025 Roma Premiership Grand Final

Sunday, 24 August 2025
3:00pm

Roma Cities Gladiators	8 – 22	Wallumbilla-Surat Red Bulls
Tries: Hayden Crouch 1 N/A 1 Goals: N/A 0/2		Tries: 1 Matthew Williams; 1 Harvey Wright; 1 Matthew York; 1 Ben York; Goals: 2/5 Lachlan Watt; 1/1 Matthew York

Bassett Park, Roma

Team details
Roma Cities		Position	Wallumbilla-Surat
Name	Number	Position	Number	Name
William Coonan	1	Fullback	1	Brayden Crawford
Hayden Crouch	2	Wing	2	Matt Williams
Connor Lacey	3	Centre	3	Matthew York
	4	Centre	4	Maverick Fisher
Charlie McInnerney	5	Wing	5	Geordie Ladbrook
Alex Coonan	6	Five eighth	6	Lachlan Watt
Mason Potter	7	Half back	7	Ben York
	8	Prop forward	8	Lucas Crawford
Joey Packer (c)	9	Hooker	9	Locke Naprasnik
Cooper Dingle	10	Prop forward	10	Jack Dawes
Dan Ferry	11	Second row	11	Jordan Galbraith
	12	Second row	12	Jimmy Pobar
Hudson Heath	13	Lock forward	13	Harvey Wright (c)
Kerryn Blake	14	Interchange	14	Matthew Walsh
Blake Walton	15	Interchange	15	Kaleb Boston
Ben Bidgood	16	Interchange	16	Bennett Ladbrook
Brendan Grulke	17	Interchange	17	Caleb Collins-Maunder
George Broadhead	18	Concussion substitute	18	William Emery
Frank Saunders		Coach		Anthony Watt

=== Sunshine Coast Premiership ===
The Sunshine Coast Premiership (Named the SCGRL A Grade) is a Sunshine Coast based men's first grade rugby league competition that features teams from the QRL Central Division. This competition feeds into the Sunshine Coast Falcons Queensland Cup team.

==== Teams ====
The lineup for 2025 will feature the same teams as 2024.

Colours	Club	QLD Cup Affiliate	Home ground(s)	Head coach
	Beerwah Bulldogs	Sunshine Coast Falcons	Beerwah Sportsground	TBA
	Caboolture Snakes	Sunshine Coast Falcons	Bob Day Oval	TBA
	Caloundra Sharks	Sunshine Coast Falcons	Tinonee Oval	TBA
	Coolum Colts	Sunshine Coast Falcons	Ronnie Cargill Oval	TBA
	Kawana Dolphins	Sunshine Coast Falcons	Kawana Sports Complex	TBA
	Maroochydore Swans	Sunshine Coast Falcons	Maroochydore Oval	TBA
	Nambour Crushers	Sunshine Coast Falcons	Nambour Oval	TBA
	Noosa Pirates	Sunshine Coast Falcons	Tewantin Sports Complex	TBA
	Stanley River Wolves	Sunshine Coast Falcons	Woodford Showground	TBA

==== Ladder ====
Pos	Team	Pld	W	D	L	B	PF	PA	PD	Pts	Qualification
1	Stanley River Wolves	16	15	0	1	2	566	170	+396	68	Minor Premiers & Major Semi-Final
2	Maroochydore Swans	16	11	1	4	2	398	264	+134	54	Qualifying Final
3	Coolum Colts	16	11	0	5	2	334	245	+89	52	Qualifying Final
4	Noosa Pirates	16	10	1	5	2	349	258	+91	50	Elimination Final
5	Kawana Dolphins	16	8	0	8	2	350	338	+12	40	Elimination Final
6	Beerwah Bulldogs	16	7	0	9	2	366	290	+76	36	
7	Caloundra Sharks	16	4	1	11	2	274	392	-118	26	
8	Nambour Crushers	16	4	0	12	2	248	512	-264	24	
9	Caboolture Snakes	16	0	1	15	2	220	636	-416	10	

Updated to match(es) played on 1 September. Source:
Rules for classification: 1) points; 2) point difference; 3) points scored

==== Ladder progression ====
- Numbers highlighted in green indicate that the team finished the round inside the top 5.
- Numbers highlighted in blue indicates the team finished first on the ladder in that round.
- Numbers highlighted in red indicates the team finished last place on the ladder in that round.
- Underlined numbers indicate that the team had a bye during that round.

Pos	Team	2	3	4	5	6	7	8	1	9	10	11	12	13	14	15	16	17	18
1	Stanley River Wolves	4	8	12	16	20	24	28	32	36	40	44	48	48	52	56	60	64	68
2	Maroochydore Swans	4	8	8	12	16	16	20	24	24	28	32	36	38	42	46	50	54	54
3	Coolum Colts	4	8	12	16	20	24	28	28	32	32	36	40	44	44	44	44	48	52
4	Noosa Pirates	4	8	12	12	12	16	16	16	20	22	26	26	30	34	38	42	46	50
5	Kawana Dolphins	0	0	4	8	8	12	12	16	20	24	24	24	28	32	36	36	36	40
6	Beerwah Bulldogs	0	0	4	8	12	16	20	20	20	20	20	24	28	28	28	32	36	36
7	Caloundra Sharks	0	4	4	4	4	4	8	12	16	18	18	18	18	22	22	26	26	26
8	Nambour Crushers	4	4	4	4	4	4	4	8	8	12	16	20	20	20	20	20	20	24
9	Caboolture Snakes	0	0	0	0	4	4	4	4	4	4	4	4	6	6	10	10	10	10

Season Results:

Home	Score	Away	Match Information
Home	Score	Away	Date and Time	Venue	Referee	Video
Round 1
Kawana Dolphins	36 – 20	Beerwah Bulldogs	Saturday, 7 June, 5:30pm	Kawana Sports Complex	TBA
Noosa Pirates	12 – 20	Caloundra Sharks	Saturday, 7 June, 5:30pm	Tewantin Sports Complex	TBA
Nambour Crushers	48 – 22	Caboolture Snakes	Sunday, 8 June, 3:00pm	Nambour Oval	TBA
Stanley River Wolves	48 – 6	Coolum Colts	Sunday, 8 June, 3:00pm	Woodford Showground	TBA
Maroochydore Swans		BYE
Round 2
Caboolture Snakes	6 – 44	Coolum Colts	Saturday, 5 April, 5:30pm	Bob Day Oval	TBA
Maroochydore Swans	44 – 8	Caloundra Sharks	Saturday, 5 April, 5:30pm	Maroochydore Oval	TBA
Beerwah Bulldogs	16 – 32	Stanley River Wolves	Sunday, 6 April, 3:00pm	Beerwah Sportsground	TBA
Noosa Pirates	30 – 6	Kawana Dolphins	Sunday, 6 April, 3:00pm	Tewantin Sports Complex	TBA
Nambour Crushers		BYE
Round 3
Caboolture Snakes	4 – 44	Stanley River Wolves	Saturday, 12 April, 5:30pm	Bob Day Oval	TBA
Nambour Crushers	10 – 32	Noosa Pirates	Saturday, 12 April, 5:30pm	Nambour Oval	TBA
Beerwah Bulldogs	6 – 38	Maroochydore Swans	Sunday, 13 April, 3:00pm	Beerwah Sportsground	TBA
Kawana Dolphins	10 – 12	Coolum Colts	Sunday, 13 April, 3:00pm	Kawana Sports Complex	TBA
Caloundra Sharks		BYE
Round 4 (ANZAC Round)
Beerwah Bulldogs	56 – 10	Caboolture Snakes	Saturday, 26 April, 5:30pm	Beerwah Sportsground	TBA
Kawana Dolphins	28 – 20	Nambour Crushers	Saturday, 26 April, 5:30pm	Kawana Sports Complex	TBA
Noosa Pirates	20 – 14	Maroochydore Swans	Saturday, 26 April, 5:30pm	Tewantin Sports Complex	TBA
Caloundra Sharks	12 – 32	Stanley River Wolves	Saturday, 26 April, 5:30pm	Tinonee Oval	TBA
Coolum Colts		BYE
Round 5
Maroochydore Swans	34 – 8	Caboolture Snakes	Saturday, 10 May, 5:30pm	Maroochydore Oval	TBA
Nambour Crushers	12 – 18	Coolum Colts	Saturday, 10 May, 5:30pm	Nambour Oval	TBA
Caloundra Sharks	0 – 40	Beerwah Bulldogs	Saturday, 10 May, 5:30pm	Tinonee Oval	TBA
Stanley River Wolves	16 – 4	Noosa Pirates	Sunday, 11 May, 3:00pm	Woodford Showground	TBA
Kawana Dolphins		BYE
Round 6
Beerwah Bulldogs	16 – 0	Noosa Pirates	Saturday, 17 May, 5:30pm	Beerwah Sportsground	TBA
Stanley River Wolves	28 – 4	Kawana Dolphins	Saturday, 17 May, 5:30pm	Woodford Showground	TBA
Maroochydore Swans	44 – 12	Nambour Crushers	Sunday, 18 May, 3:00pm	Maroochydore Oval	TBA
Coolum Colts	30 – 12	Caloundra Sharks	Sunday, 18 May, 3:00pm	Ronnie Cargill Oval	TBA
Caboolture Snakes		BYE
Round 7
Nambour Crushers	10 – 40	Stanley River Wolves	Saturday, 24 May, 5:30pm	Nambour Oval	TBA
Coolum Colts	18 – 8	Maroochydore Swans	Saturday, 24 May, 5:30pm	Ronnie Cargill Oval	TBA
Caboolture Snakes	20 – 28	Noosa Pirates	Sunday, 25 May, 3:00pm	Bob Day Oval	TBA
Kawana Dolphins	50 – 18	Caloundra Sharks	Sunday, 25 May, 3:00pm	Kawana Sports Complex	TBA
Beerwah Bulldogs		BYE
Round 8
Nambour Crushers	10 – 32	Beerwah Bulldogs	Saturday, 31 May, 5:30pm	Nambour Oval	TBA
Noosa Pirates	16 – 24	Coolum Colts	Saturday, 31 May, 5:30pm	Tewantin Sports Complex	TBA
Caboolture Snakes	6 – 34	Caloundra Sharks	Sunday, 1 June, 3:00pm	Bob Day Oval	TBA
Kawana Dolphins	24 – 30	Maroochydore Swans	Sunday, 1 June, 3:00pm	Kawana Sports Complex	TBA
Stanley River Wolves		BYE
Round 9
Caboolture Snakes	14 – 50	Kawana Dolphins	Saturday, 14 June, 5:30pm	Bob Day Oval	TBA
Stanley River Wolves	42 – 6	Maroochydore Swans	Saturday, 14 June, 5:30pm	Woodford Showground	TBA
Coolum Colts	12 – 6	Beerwah Bulldogs	Sunday, 15 June, 3:00pm	Ronnie Cargill Oval	TBA
Caloundra Sharks	46 – 0	Nambour Crushers	Sunday, 15 June, 3:00pm	Tinonee Oval	TBA
Noosa Pirates		BYE
Round 10
Caboolture Snakes	18 – 24	Nambour Crushers	Saturday, 21 June, 5:30pm	Bob Day Oval	TBA
Coolum Colts	12 – 14	Stanley River Wolves	Saturday, 21 June, 5:30pm	Ronnie Cargill Oval	TBA
Caloundra Sharks	14 – 14	Noosa Pirates	Saturday, 21 June, 5:30pm	Tinonee Oval	TBA
Beerwah Bulldogs	12 – 24	Kawana Dolphins	Sunday, 22 June, 3:00pm	Beerwah Sportsground	TBA
Maroochydore Swans		BYE
Round 11
Kawana Dolphins	14 – 34	Noosa Pirates	Saturday, 28 June, 5:30pm	Kawana Sports Complex	TBA
Coolum Colts	38 – 18	Caboolture Snakes	Saturday, 28 June, 5:30pm	Ronnie Cargill Oval	TBA
Caloundra Sharks	20 – 22	Maroochydore Swans	Saturday, 28 June, 5:30pm	Tinonee Oval	TBA
Stanley River Wolves	36 – 6	Beerwah Bulldogs	Sunday, 29 June, 3:00pm	Woodford Showground	TBA
Nambour Crushers		BYE
Round 12
Nambour Crushers	18 – 16	Kawana Dolphins	Saturday, 5 July, 5:30pm	Nambour Oval	TBA
Stanley River Wolves	20 – 14	Caloundra Sharks	Saturday, 5 July, 5:30pm	Woodford Showground	TBA
Caboolture Snakes	16 – 56	Beerwah Bulldogs	Sunday, 6 July, 3:00pm	Bob Day Oval	TBA
Maroochydore Swans	24 – 14	Noosa Pirates	Sunday, 6 July, 3:00pm	Maroochydore Oval	TBA
Coolum Colts		BYE
Round 13
Beerwah Bulldogs	32 – 6	Caloundra Sharks	Saturday, 12 July, 5:30pm	Beerwah Sportsground	TBA
Caboolture Snakes	26 – 26	Maroochydore Swans	Saturday, 12 July, 5:30pm	Bob Day Oval	TBA
Noosa Pirates	42 – 20	Stanley River Wolves	Saturday, 12 July, 5:30pm	Tewantin Sports Complex	TBA
Coolum Colts	28 – 10	Nambour Crushers	Sunday, 13 July, 3:00pm	Ronnie Cargill Oval	TBA
Kawana Dolphins		BYE
Round 14
Maroochydore Swans	18 – 6	Beerwah Bulldogs	Saturday, 19 July, 5:30pm	Maroochydore Oval	TBA
Coolum Colts	14 – 26	Kawana Dolphins	Saturday, 19 July, 5:30pm	Ronnie Cargill Oval	TBA
Noosa Pirates	32 – 22	Nambour Crushers	Sunday, 20 July, 3:00pm	Tewantin Sports Complex	TBA
Stanley River Wolves	54 – 10	Caboolture Snakes	Sunday, 20 July, 3:00pm	Woodford Showground	TBA
Caloundra Sharks		BYE
Round 15
Maroochydore Swans	20 – 18	Coolum Colts	Saturday, 26 July, 5:30pm	Maroochydore Oval	TBA
Caloundra Sharks	4 – 6	Kawana Dolphins	Saturday, 26 July, 5:30pm	Tinonee Oval	TBA
Stanley River Wolves	68 – 4	Nambour Crushers	Saturday, 26 July, 5:30pm	Woodford Showground	TBA
Noosa Pirates	26 – 22	Beerwah Bulldogs	Sunday, 27 July, 3:00pm	Tewantin Sports Complex	TBA
Caboolture Snakes		BYE
Round 16
Beerwah Bulldogs	28 – 12	Nambour Crushers	Saturday, 2 August, 5:30pm	Beerwah Sportsground	TBA
Maroochydore Swans	22 – 8	Kawana Dolphins	Saturday, 2 August, 5:30pm	Maroochydore Oval	TBA
Coolum Colts	12 – 19	Noosa Pirates	Saturday, 2 August, 5:30pm	Ronnie Cargill Oval	TBA
Caloundra Sharks	38 – 24	Caboolture Snakes	Sunday, 3 August, 3:00pm	Tinonee Oval	TBA
Stanley River Wolves		BYE
Round 17
Kawana Dolphins	12 – 48	Stanley River Wolves	Saturday, 9 August, 5:30pm	Kawana Sports Complex	TBA
Noosa Pirates	26 – 4	Caboolture Snakes	Saturday, 9 August, 5:30pm	Tewantin Sports Complex	TBA
Nambour Crushers	10 – 40	Maroochydore Swans	Sunday, 10 August, 3:00pm	Nambour Oval	TBA
Caloundra Sharks	8 – 34	Coolum Colts	Sunday, 10 August, 3:00pm	Tinonee Oval	TBA
Beerwah Bulldogs		BYE
Round 18
Beerwah Bulldogs	12 – 14	Coolum Colts	Saturday, 16 August, 5:30pm	Beerwah Sportsground	TBA
Kawana Dolphins	36 – 14	Caboolture Snakes	Saturday, 16 August, 5:30pm	Kawana Sports Complex	TBA
Nambour Crushers	26 – 20	Caloundra Sharks	Saturday, 16 August, 5:30pm	Nambour Oval	TBA
Maroochydore Swans	8 – 24	Stanley River Wolves	Sunday, 17 August, 3:00pm	Maroochydore Oval	TBA
Noosa Pirates		BYE
Finals Series
Qualifying & Elimination Finals
Noosa Pirates	18 – 24	Kawana Dolphins	Saturday, 23 August, 5:30pm	Tewantin Sports Complex	TBA
Maroochydore Swans	14 – 6	Coolum Colts	Saturday, 23 August, 5:30pm	Maroochydore Oval	TBA
Major & Minor Semi-Finals
Coolum Colts	22 – 16	Kawana Dolphins	Saturday, 30 August, 5:30pm	Ronnie Cargill Oval	TBA
Stanley River Wolves	26 – 22	Maroochydore Swans	Saturday, 30 August, 5:30pm	Woodford Showground	TBA
Preliminary Final
Maroochydore Swans	13 – 12	Coolum Colts	Sunday, 7 September, 5:30pm	Sunshine Coast Stadium	TBA
Grand Final
Stanley River Wolves	V	Maroochydore Swans	Sunday, 14 September, 4:30pm	Sunshine Coast Stadium	TBA

==== Grand Final ====
Qualifying & Elimination Finals
2	Maroochydore	14
3	Coolum	6
4	Noosa	18
5	Kawana	24

Major Semi-Final
1	Stanley River	26
2	Maroochydore	22
Minor Semi-Final
3	Coolum	22
5	Kawana	16

Preliminary Final
2	Maroochydore	13
3	Coolum	12

Grand Final
1	Stanley River
2	Maroochydore

2025 Sunshine Coast Premiership Grand Final

Sunday, 14 September 2025
4:30pm

Stanley River Wolves	v	Maroochydore Swans

Sunshine Coast Stadium, Sunshine Coast

=== Toowoomba Premiership ===
The Toowoomba Premiership (named the Hutchison Builders A Grade Cup for sponsorship reasons) is a Toowoomba based men's first grade rugby league competition that features teams from the QRL Central Division. This competition feeds into the Western Clydesdales Queensland Cup team.

==== Teams ====
The competition will feature 1 less team than 2024 with Newtown going into recess.

Colours	Club	QLD Cup Affiliate	Home ground(s)	Head coach
	Dalby Diehards	Western Clydesdales	Dalby Rugby League Ground	TBA
	Gatton Hawks	Western Clydesdales	Cahill Park Sporting Complex	TBA
	Goondiwindi Boars	Western Clydesdales	Gilbert Oval	TBA
	Highfields Eagles	Western Clydesdales	Kuhls Road Oval	TBA
	Oakey Bears	Western Clydesdales	Oakey Rugby League Field	TBA
	Pittsworth Danes	Western Clydesdales	Pittsworth Rugby League Ground	TBA
	Southern Suburbs Tigers	Western Clydesdales	Gold Park	TBA
	Toowoomba Brothers Leprechauns	Western Clydesdales	Glenholme Park	TBA
	Toowoomba Valleys Roosters	Western Clydesdales	John McDonald Sports Complex	TBA
	Warwick Cowboys	Western Clydesdales	Father Ranger Oval	TBA
	Wattles Warriors	Western Clydesdales	Platz Oval	TBA

==== Ladder ====
Pos	Team	Pld	W	D	L	B	PF	PA	PD	Pts	Qualification
1	Gatton Hawks	16	15	1	0	2	580	176	+404	35	Minor Premiers & Major Semi-Final
2	Wattles Warriors	16	13	0	3	2	624	372	+252	30	Qualifying Final
3	Toowoomba Brothers Leprechauns	16	13	0	3	2	532	348	+184	30	Qualifying Final
4	Pittsworth Danes	16	8	0	8	2	440	422	+18	20	Elimination Final
5	Toowoomba Valleys Roosters	16	8	0	8	2	408	490	-82	20	Elimination Final
6	Goondiwindi Boars	16	7	1	8	2	488	458	+30	19	
7	Warwick Cowboys	16	7	0	9	2	460	397	+63	18	
8	Dalby Diehards	16	6	1	9	2	430	566	-136	17	
9	Oakey Bears	16	4	0	12	2	418	553	-135	12	
10	Highfields Eagles	16	3	1	12	2	346	570	-224	11	
11	Southern Suburbs Tigers	16	1	2	13	2	266	638	-372	8	

Updated to match(es) played on 1 September. Source:
Rules for classification: 1) points; 2) point difference; 3) points scored

===== Ladder progression =====
- Numbers highlighted in green indicate that the team finished the round inside the top 5.
- Numbers highlighted in blue indicates the team finished first on the ladder in that round.
- Numbers highlighted in red indicates the team finished last place on the ladder in that round.
- Underlined numbers indicate that the team had a bye during that round.

Pos	Team	1	2	3	4	5	6	7	8	9	10	11	12	13	14	15	16	17	18
1	Gatton Hawks	2	4	6	8	10	12	14	16	18	20	22	24	26	28	29	31	33	35
2	Wattles Warriors	2	4	6	8	8	10	12	14	14	16	18	20	22	24	24	26	28	30
3	Toowoomba Brothers Leprechauns	2	4	6	8	10	10	10	12	14	14	16	18	20	22	24	26	28	30
4	Pittsworth Danes	2	4	6	6	6	6	6	6	8	8	10	12	14	14	16	18	18	20
5	Toowoomba Valleys Roosters	0	2	2	2	2	4	6	8	10	10	12	14	16	16	18	18	18	20
6	Goondiwindi Boars	2	2	3	5	5	7	7	9	11	13	13	15	15	17	17	19	19	19
7	Warwick Cowboys	0	2	4	4	6	8	10	10	10	12	12	12	14	16	16	16	18	18
8	Dalby Diehards	0	0	1	3	5	5	7	9	9	11	13	13	13	13	15	17	17	17
9	Oakey Bears	2	2	2	2	2	4	4	4	4	6	6	6	8	8	10	10	12	12
10	Highfields Eagles	0	0	0	2	4	4	4	4	5	5	5	5	5	7	9	9	11	11
11	Southern Suburbs Tigers	0	0	0	0	2	2	4	4	5	5	5	5	5	5	6	6	6	8

Season Results:

Home	Score	Away	Match Information
Home	Score	Away	Date and Time	Venue	Referee	Video
Round 1
Warwick Cowboys	20 – 34	Toowoomba Brothers Leprechauns	Saturday, 5 April, 7:30pm	Father Ranger Oval	TBA
Toowoomba Valleys Roosters	0 – 52	Gatton Hawks	Saturday, 5 April, 7:30pm	John McDonald Sports Complex	TBA
Pittsworth Danes	44 – 10	Highfields Eagles	Saturday, 5 April, 7:30pm	Pittsworth Rugby League Ground	TBA
Dalby Diehards	12 – 50	Wattles Warriors	Sunday, 6 April, 2:30pm	Dalby Rugby League Ground	TBA
Southern Suburbs Tigers	6 – 40	Oakey Bears	Sunday, 6 April, 2:30pm	Toowoomba Sports Ground	TBA
Goondiwindi Boars		BYE
Round 2
Highfields Eagles	22 – 44	Toowoomba Brothers Leprechauns	Saturday, 12 April, 6:00pm	Kuhls Road Oval	TBA
Toowoomba Valleys Roosters	36 – 18	Southern Suburbs Tigers	Saturday, 12 April, 6:30pm	John McDonald Sports Complex	TBA
Oakey Bears	18 – 52	Wattles Warriors	Saturday, 12 April, 6:30pm	Oakey Rugby League Field	TBA
Gatton Hawks	68 – 0	Dalby Diehards	Sunday, 13 April, 2:30pm	Cahill Park Sporting Complex	TBA
Goondiwindi Boars	26 – 30	Warwick Cowboys	Sunday, 13 April, 2:30pm	Gilbert Oval	TBA
Pittsworth Danes		BYE
Round 3 (ANZAC Round)
Gatton Hawks	44 – 10	Southern Suburbs Tigers	Friday, 25 April, 6:30pm	Cahill Park Sporting Complex	TBA
Pittsworth Danes	30 – 26	Oakey Bears	Friday, 25 April, 6:30pm	Pittsworth Rugby League Ground	TBA
Wattles Warriors	30 – 22	Highfields Eagles	Friday, 25 April, 6:30pm	Platz Oval	TBA
Toowoomba Brothers Leprechauns	26 – 16	Toowoomba Valleys Roosters	Saturday, 26 April, 6:30pm	Glenholme Park	TBA
Dalby Diehards	32 – 32	Goondiwindi Boars	Saturday, 26 April, 6:30pm	Dalby Rugby League Ground	TBA
Warwick Cowboys		BYE
Round 4
Goondiwindi Boars	40 – 16	Toowoomba Valleys Roosters	Saturday, 3 May, 6:30pm	Gilbert Oval	TBA
Southern Suburbs Tigers	16 – 36	Toowoomba Brothers Leprechauns	Saturday, 3 May, 6:30pm	Gold Park	TBA
Warwick Cowboys	28 – 34	Dalby Diehards	Sunday, 4 May, 2:30pm	Father Ranger Oval	TBA
Oakey Bears	14 – 32	Gatton Hawks	Sunday, 4 May, 2:30pm	Oakey Rugby League Field	TBA
Wattles Warriors	28 – 18	Pittsworth Danes	Sunday, 4 May, 2:30pm	Platz Oval	TBA
Highfields Eagles		BYE
Round 5
Gatton Hawks	32 – 22	Wattles Warriors	Saturday, 10 May, 6:30pm	Cahill Park Sporting Complex	TBA
Oakey Bears	24 – 31	Highfields Eagles	Saturday, 10 May, 6:30pm	Oakey Rugby League Field	TBA
Southern Suburbs Tigers	34 – 32	Goondiwindi Boars	Sunday, 11 May, 2:30pm	Gold Park	TBA
Toowoomba Valleys Roosters	6 – 46	Warwick Cowboys	Sunday, 11 May, 2:30pm	John McDonald Sports Complex	TBA
Pittsworth Danes	28 – 36	Dalby Diehards	Sunday, 11 May, 2:30pm	Pittsworth Rugby League Ground	TBA
Toowoomba Brothers Leprechauns		BYE
Round 6
Dalby Diehards	24 – 38	Oakey Bears	Saturday, 17 May, 6:30pm	Dalby Rugby League Ground	TBA
Warwick Cowboys	42 – 18	Southern Suburbs Tigers	Saturday, 17 May, 6:30pm	Father Ranger Oval	TBA
Goondiwindi Boars	50 – 18	Pittsworth Danes	Sunday, 18 May, 2:30pm	Gilbert Oval	TBA
Toowoomba Brothers Leprechauns	10 – 42	Gatton Hawks	Sunday, 18 May, 2:30pm	Glenholme Park	TBA
Highfields Eagles	24 – 30	Toowoomba Valleys Roosters	Sunday, 18 May, 2:30pm	Kuhls Road Oval	TBA
Wattles Warriors		BYE
Round 7
Toowoomba Brothers Leprechauns	16 – 22	Dalby Diehards	Saturday, 24 May, 6:30pm	Glenholme Park	TBA
Wattles Warriors	38 – 16	Goondiwindi Boars	Saturday, 24 May, 6:30pm	Platz Oval	TBA
Gatton Hawks	54 – 0	Highfields Eagles	Sunday, 25 May, 2:30pm	Cahill Park Sporting Complex	TBA
Oakey Bears	32 – 34	Warwick Cowboys	Sunday, 25 May, 2:30pm	Oakey Rugby League Field	TBA
Toowoomba Valleys Roosters	28 – 26	Pittsworth Danes	Sunday, 25 May, 2:30pm	Platz Oval	TBA
Southern Suburbs Tigers		BYE
Round 8
Toowoomba Valleys Roosters	48 – 24	Oakey Bears	Saturday, 31 May, 6:30pm	John McDonald Sports Complex	TBA
Highfields Eagles	18 – 34	Goondiwindi Boars	Saturday, 31 May, 6:30pm	Kuhls Road Oval	TBA
Warwick Cowboys	18 – 22	Gatton Hawks	Sunday, 1 June, 2:30pm	Father Ranger Oval	TBA
Pittsworth Danes	12 – 24	Toowoomba Brothers Leprechauns	Sunday, 1 June, 2:30pm	Pittsworth Rugby League Ground	TBA
Wattles Warriors	52 – 20	Southern Suburbs Tigers	Sunday, 1 June, 2:30pm	Platz Oval	TBA
Dalby Diehards		BYE
Round 9
Goondiwindi Boars	32 – 24	Oakey Bears	Saturday, 14 June, 6:30pm	Gilbert Oval	TBA
Dalby Diehards	16 – 30	Toowoomba Valleys Roosters	Saturday, 14 June, 6:30pm	Dalby Rugby League Ground	TBA
Warwick Cowboys	28 – 38	Pittsworth Danes	Sunday, 15 June, 2:30pm	Father Ranger Oval	TBA
Toowoomba Brothers Leprechauns	50 – 24	Wattles Warriors	Sunday, 15 June, 2:30pm	Glenholme Park	TBA
Southern Suburbs Tigers	34 – 34	Highfields Eagles	Sunday, 15 June, 2:30pm	Gold Park	TBA
Gatton Hawks		BYE
Round 10
Pittsworth Danes	6 – 28	Gatton Hawks	Saturday, 21 June, 6:30pm	Pittsworth Rugby League Ground	TBA
Wattles Warriors	42 – 10	Toowoomba Valleys Roosters	Saturday, 21 June, 6:30pm	Platz Oval	TBA
Dalby Diehards	56 – 8	Southern Suburbs Tigers	Sunday, 22 June, 2:30pm	Dalby Rugby League Ground	TBA
Goondiwindi Boars	26 – 24	Toowoomba Brothers Leprechauns	Sunday, 22 June, 2:30pm	Gilbert Oval	TBA
Highfields Eagles	24 – 34	Warwick Cowboys	Sunday, 22 June, 2:30pm	Kuhls Road Oval	TBA
Oakey Bears		BYE
Round 11
Warwick Cowboys	30 – 32	Wattles Warriors	Saturday, 28 June, 6:30pm	Father Ranger Oval	TBA
Oakey Bears	14 – 46	Toowoomba Brothers Leprechauns	Saturday, 28 June, 6:30pm	Oakey Rugby League Field	TBA
Gatton Hawks	40 – 12	Goondiwindi Boars	Saturday, 28 June, 6:30pm	Cahill Park Sporting Complex	TBA
Highfields Eagles	24 – 32	Dalby Diehards	Saturday, 28 June, 6:30pm	Kuhls Road Oval	TBA
Pittsworth Danes	52 – 8	Southern Suburbs Tigers	Saturday, 28 June, 6:30pm	Pittsworth Rugby League Ground	TBA
Toowoomba Valleys Roosters		BYE
Round 12
Gatton Hawks	20 – 6	Oakey Bears	Saturday, 12 July, 6:30pm	Cahill Park Sporting Complex	TBA
Toowoomba Brothers Leprechauns	26 – 22	Warwick Cowboys	Saturday, 12 July, 6:30pm	Glenholme Park	TBA
Southern Suburbs Tigers	18 – 42	Wattles Warriors	Saturday, 12 July, 6:30pm	Gold Park	TBA
Toowoomba Valleys Roosters	48 – 28	Highfields Eagles	Sunday, 13 July, 2:30pm	John McDonald Sports Complex	TBA
Goondiwindi Boars	46 – 28	Dalby Diehards	Sunday, 13 July, 2:30pm	Gilbert Oval	TBA
Pittsworth Danes		BYE
Round 13
Dalby Diehards	18 – 36	Warwick Cowboys	Saturday, 19 July, 6:30pm	Dalby Rugby League Ground	TBA
Oakey Bears	50 – 26	Goondiwindi Boars	Saturday, 19 July, 6:30pm	John McDonald Sports Complex	TBA
Southern Suburbs Tigers	28 – 42	Toowoomba Valleys Roosters	Sunday, 20 July, 2:30pm	Gold Park	TBA
Highfields Eagles	14 – 48	Pittsworth Danes	Sunday, 20 July, 2:30pm	Kuhls Road Oval	TBA
Toowoomba Brothers Leprechauns	BYE	Wattles Warriors
Gatton Hawks	BYE
Round 14
Warwick Cowboys	28 – 10	Toowoomba Valleys Roosters	Saturday, 26 July, 6:30pm	Father Ranger Oval	TBA
Goondiwindi Boars	56 – 10	Southern Suburbs Tigers	Saturday, 26 July, 6:30pm	Gilbert Oval	TBA
Dalby Diehards	18 – 46	Gatton Hawks	Sunday, 27 July, 2:30pm	Dalby Rugby League Ground	TBA
Toowoomba Brothers Leprechauns	52 – 6	Pittsworth Danes	Sunday, 27 July, 2:30pm	Glenholme Park	TBA
Wattles Warriors	52 – 12	Oakey Bears	Sunday, 27 July, 2:30pm	Platz Oval	TBA
Highfields Eagles		BYE
Round 15
Warwick Cowboys	18 – 19	Highfields Eagles	Saturday, 2 August, 6:30pm	Father Ranger Oval	TBA
Wattles Warriors	20 – 28	Toowoomba Brothers Leprechauns	Saturday, 2 August, 6:30pm	Platz Oval	TBA
Pittsworth Danes	22 – 16	Goondiwindi Boars	Sunday, 3 August, 2:30pm	Pittsworth Rugby League Ground	TBA
Southern Suburbs Tigers	0 – 0*	Gatton Hawks	Washout
Dalby Diehards	BYE	Toowoomba Valleys Roosters
Oakey Bears	BYE
Round 16
Toowoomba Brothers Leprechauns	36 – 26	Highfields Eagles	Saturday, 9 August, 6:30pm	Glenholme Park	TBA
Southern Suburbs Tigers	18 – 38	Pittsworth Danes	Saturday, 9 August, 6:30pm	Gold Park	TBA
Oakey Bears	28 – 44	Dalby Diehards	Saturday, 9 August, 6:30pm	Oakey Rugby League Field	TBA
Gatton Hawks	26 – 24	Warwick Cowboys	Sunday, 10 August, 2:30pm	Cahill Park Sporting Complex	TBA
Toowoomba Valleys Roosters	24 – 44	Wattles Warriors	Sunday, 10 August, 2:30pm	John McDonald Sports Complex	TBA
Goondiwindi Boars		BYE
Round 17
Dalby Diehards	30 – 32	Toowoomba Brothers Leprechauns	Saturday, 16 August, 6:30pm	Dalby Rugby League Ground	TBA
Goondiwindi Boars	34 – 38	Wattles Warriors	Saturday, 16 August, 6:30pm	Gilbert Oval	TBA
Gatton Hawks	34 – 22	Pittsworth Danes	Sunday, 17 August, 2:30pm	Cahill Park Sporting Complex	TBA
Southern Suburbs Tigers	20 – 36	Highfields Eagles	Sunday, 17 August, 2:30pm	Gold Park	TBA
Oakey Bears	38 – 28	Toowoomba Valleys Roosters	Sunday, 17 August, 2:30pm	Oakey Rugby League Field	TBA
Warwick Cowboys		BYE
Round 18
Toowoomba Valleys Roosters	36 – 10	Goondiwindi Boars	Saturday, 23 August, 6:30pm	John McDonald Sports Complex	TBA
Highfields Eagles	14 – 40	Gatton Hawks	Saturday, 23 August, 6:30pm	Kuhls Road Oval	TBA
Toowoomba Brothers Leprechauns	48 – 30	Oakey Bears	Sunday, 24 August, 2:30pm	Glenholme Park	TBA
Pittsworth Danes	32 – 22	Warwick Cowboys	Sunday, 24 August, 2:30pm	Pittsworth Rugby League Ground	TBA
Wattles Warriors	58 – 28	Dalby Diehards	Sunday, 24 August, 2:30pm	Platz Oval	TBA
Southern Suburbs Tigers		BYE
Finals Series
Qualifying & Elimination Finals
Pittsworth Danes	26 – 30	Toowoomba Valleys Roosters	Saturday, 30 August, 6:30pm	Pittsworth Rugby League Ground	TBA
Wattles Warriors	36 – 16	Toowoomba Brothers Leprechauns	Sunday, 31 August, 2:30pm	Platz Oval	TBA
Major & Minor Semi-Finals
Toowoomba Brothers Leprechauns	42 – 4	Toowoomba Valleys Roosters	Saturday, 6 September, 6:30pm	Glenholme Park	TBA
Gatton Hawks	38 – 16	Wattles Warriors	Sunday, 7 September, 2:30pm	Cahill Park Sporting Complex	TBA
Preliminary Final
Wattles Warriors	29 – 28	Toowoomba Brothers Leprechauns	Sunday, 14 September, 3:30pm	Toowoomba Sports Ground	TBA
Grand Final
Gatton Hawks	V	Wattles Warriors	Saturday, 20 September, 6:30pm	Toowoomba Sports Ground	TBA

==== Grand Final ====
Qualifying & Elimination Finals
2	Wattles	36
3	Toowoomba Brothers	16
4	Pittsworth	26
5	Toowoomba Valleys	30

Major Semi-Final
1	Gatton	38
2	Wattles	16
Minor Semi-Final
3	Toowoomba Brothers	42
5	Toowoomba Valleys	4

Preliminary Final
2	Wattles	29
3	Toowoomba Brothers	28

Grand Final
1	Gatton
2	Wattles

2025 Toowoomba Premiership Grand Final

Saturday, 20 September 2025
6:30pm

Gatton Hawks	v	Wattles Warriors

Toowoomba Sports Ground, Toowoomba

== South East Division ==
=== Brisbane Premiership ===
The Brisbane Premiership (named the BRL Premier A Grade) is a Brisbane based men's first grade rugby league competition that features teams from the QRL South East Division. This competition feeds into multiple Brisbane based Queensland Cup teams.

==== Teams ====
There are 3 confirmed changes for the 2025 season with multiple clubs exiting the competition.

- Bulimba Valleys Bulldogs
- Brighton Roosters
- Normanby Hounds

In January 2025 Beenleigh Pride announced they were changing their name to Logan Pride.

Colours	Club	QLD Cup Affiliate	Home ground(s)	Head coach
	Carina Tigers	Brisbane Tigers	Leo Williams Oval, Totally Workwear Stadium	Ben Cross
	Fortitude Valley Diehards	Norths Devils	Emerson Park	Jason Di Lizio
	Logan Pride	Wynnum Manly Seagulls	Meakin Park	Ian Frame
	Redcliffe Dolphins (R)		Kayo Stadium, Jim Lawrie Oval	Dunamis Lui
	Souths Logan Magpies (R)		Brandon Park, Davies Park	Lote Tuqiri
	West Brisbane Panthers	Norths Devils	Frank Lind Oval	Jason Harris
	Wynnum Manly Seagulls (R)		BMD Kougari Oval, Kitchener Park	Mark Gliddon

Queensland State Map	Brisbane Map
Home Venues	Home Venues

==== Ladder ====
Pos	Team	Pld	W	D	L	B	PF	PA	PD	Pts	Qualification
1	Redcliffe Dolphins (R)	18	13	2	3	3	452	252	+200	34	Minor Premiers & Major Semi-Final
2	Carina Tigers	18	12	1	5	3	492	322	+170	31	Major Semi-Final
3	West Brisbane Panthers	18	12	1	5	3	412	255	+157	31	Minor Semi-Final
4	Wynnum Manly Seagulls (R)	18	10	1	7	3	470	360	+110	27	Minor Semi-Final
5	Logan Pride	18	4	2	12	3	312	546	-234	16	
6	Fortitude Valley Diehards	18	4	1	13	3	308	459	-151	15	
7	Souths Logan Magpies (R)	18	3	2	13	3	282	534	-252	14	

Updated to match(es) played on 1 September. Source:
Rules for classification: 1) points; 2) point difference; 3) points scored

===== Ladder progression =====
- Numbers highlighted in green indicate that the team finished the round inside the top 4.
- Numbers highlighted in blue indicates the team finished first on the ladder in that round.
- Numbers highlighted in red indicates the team finished last place on the ladder in that round.
- Underlined numbers indicate that the team had a bye during that round.

Pos	Team	2	4	5	3	6	7	8	9	1	10	11	12	13	14	15	16	17	18	19	20	21
1	Redcliffe Dolphins (R)	2	2	4	5	7	9	11	13	15	17	19	21	23	23	25	26	28	28	30	32	34
2	Carina Tigers	2	4	6	7	9	9	9	11	13	15	17	19	19	21	23	25	27	29	29	29	31
3	West Brisbane Panthers	0	2	4	5	7	9	11	13	13	13	15	15	17	19	21	23	23	25	27	29	31
4	Wynnum Manly Seagulls (R)	0	2	2	4	4	6	8	8	10	12	12	14	16	18	18	18	20	21	23	25	27
5	Logan Pride	2	4	4	5	5	5	7	7	7	7	9	11	11	11	11	11	13	14	14	16	16
6	Fortitude Valley Diehards	2	2	4	5	5	5	5	7	9	11	11	11	11	11	13	15	15	15	15	15	15
7	Souths Logan Magpies (R)	0	0	0	1	3	5	5	5	5	5	5	5	7	9	9	10	10	12	14	14	14

Season Results:

Home	Score	Away	Match Information
Home	Score	Away	Date and Time	Venue	Referee	Video
Round 1
Souths Logan Magpies (R)	22 – 38	Carina Tigers	Saturday, 24 May, 3:00pm	Brandon Park	Tori Wilkie
Logan Pride	18 – 36	Fortitude Valley Diehards	Saturday, 24 May, 3:00pm	Meakin Park	Cameron Wagner
West Brisbane Panthers	18 – 24	Wynnum Manly Seagulls (R)	Saturday, 24 May, 5:00pm	Frank Lind Oval	Lachlan Sutton
Redcliffe Dolphins (R)		BYE
Round 2
Logan Pride	18 – 14	Souths Logan Magpies (R)	Saturday, 22 March, 3:00pm	Meakin Park	Nick McEwan
Wynnum Manly Seagulls (R)	6 – 16	Redcliffe Dolphins (R)	Saturday, 22 March, 3:30pm	Kitchener Park	Dylan Lawrence
Carina Tigers	30 – 18	West Brisbane Panthers	Sunday, 23 March, 2:00pm	Totally Workwear Stadium	Cody Kwik
Fortitude Valley Diehards		BYE
Round 3
Fortitude Valley Diehards	0 – 0*	Redcliffe Dolphins (R)	Washout
Logan Pride	0 – 0*	Carina Tigers	Washout
Souths Logan Magpies (R)	0 – 0*	West Brisbane Panthers	Washout
Wynnum Manly Seagulls (R)		BYE
Round 4
Redcliffe Dolphins (R)	6 – 32	West Brisbane Panthers	Saturday, 5 April, 6:00pm	Kayo Stadium	Cody Kwik
Wynnum Manly Seagulls (R)	44 – 10	Souths Logan Magpies (R)	Sunday, 6 April, 11:45am	BMD Kougari Oval	Adam Rossiter
Carina Tigers	30 – 18	Fortitude Valley Diehards	Sunday, 6 April, 3:00pm	Totally Workwear Stadium	Tori Wilkie
Logan Pride		BYE
Round 5
Wynnum Manly Seagulls (R)	6 – 10	Fortitude Valley Diehards	Saturday, 12 April, 3:00pm	Kitchener Park	Jesse Burns
West Brisbane Panthers	64 – 10	Logan Pride	Saturday, 12 April, 4:30pm	Frank Lind Oval	Ethan Denning
Redcliffe Dolphins (R)	18 – 10	Souths Logan Magpies (R)	Saturday, 12 April, 4:30pm	Jim Lawrie Oval	Josh Vernon
Carina Tigers		BYE
Round 6 (ANZAC Round)
Fortitude Valley Diehards	12 – 42	West Brisbane Panthers	Saturday, 26 April, 12:00pm	Emerson Park	Cody Kwik
Wynnum Manly Seagulls (R)	6 – 26	Carina Tigers	Saturday, 26 April, 1:30pm	BMD Kougari Oval	Dylan Lawrence
Souths Logan Magpies (R)	40 – 16	Logan Pride	Sunday, 27 April, 1:00pm	Davies Park	Nick McEwan
Redcliffe Dolphins (R)		BYE
Round 7
West Brisbane Panthers	20 – 4	Carina Tigers	Saturday, 3 May, 12:00pm	Frank Lind Oval	Adam Rossiter
Redcliffe Dolphins (R)	40 – 8	Fortitude Valley Diehards	Saturday, 3 May, 12:00pm	Kayo Stadium	Tori Wilkie
Logan Pride	6 – 42	Wynnum Manly Seagulls (R)	Saturday, 3 May, 12:00pm	Meakin Park	Rochelle Tamarua
Souths Logan Magpies (R)		BYE
Round 8
Fortitude Valley Diehards	12 – 38	Logan Pride	Saturday, 10 May, 3:00pm	Emerson Park	Tori Wilkie
Carina Tigers	12 – 30	Redcliffe Dolphins (R)	Saturday, 10 May, 3:00pm	Leo Williams Oval	Cody Kwik
West Brisbane Panthers	14 – 6	Souths Logan Magpies (R)	Saturday, 10 May, 4:30pm	Frank Lind Oval	Nick McEwan
Wynnum Manly Seagulls (R)		BYE
Round 9
Carina Tigers	44 – 22	Logan Pride	Saturday, 17 May, 1:30pm	Totally Workwear Stadium	Tori Wilkie
Redcliffe Dolphins (R)	26 – 24	Wynnum Manly Seagulls (R)	Saturday, 17 May, 4:30pm	Jim Lawrie Oval	Dylan Lawrence
Souths Logan Magpies (R)	12 – 18	Fortitude Valley Diehards	Sunday, 18 May, 12:00pm	Davies Park	Rochelle Tamarua
West Brisbane Panthers		BYE
Round 10
Redcliffe Dolphins (R)	34 – 12	Logan Pride	Saturday, 31 May, 3:00pm	Jim Lawrie Oval	Ethan Denning-Ebert
Carina Tigers	34 – 12	Souths Logan Magpies (R)	Saturday, 31 May, 3:00pm	Leo Williams Oval	Josh Vernon
Wynnum Manly Seagulls (R)	30 – 4	West Brisbane Panthers	Sunday, 1 June, 3:00pm	BMD Kougari Oval	Jordan Morel
Fortitude Valley Diehards		BYE
Round 11
Souths Logan Magpies (R)	0 – 72	Redcliffe Dolphins (R)	Saturday, 7 June, 3:00pm	Brandon Park	Byron Cook
West Brisbane Panthers	14 – 10	Fortitude Valley Diehards	Saturday, 7 June, 4:30pm	Purtell Park	Cody Kwik
Wynnum Manly Seagulls (R)	16 – 34	Logan Pride	Sunday, 8 June, 12:30pm	BMD Kougari Oval	Nick McEwan
Carina Tigers		BYE
Round 12
Fortitude Valley Diehards	20 – 50	Carina Tigers	Saturday, 14 June, 3:00pm	Bishop Park	Cody Kwik
West Brisbane Panthers	12 – 25	Redcliffe Dolphins (R)	Saturday, 14 June, 4:30pm	Frank Lind Oval	Jordan Morel
Souths Logan Magpies (R)	18 – 50	Wynnum Manly Seagulls (R)	Sunday, 15 June, 11:00am	Davies Park	Ethan Denning-Ebert
Logan Pride		BYE
Round 13
Logan Pride	8 – 22	West Brisbane Panthers	Saturday, 21 June, 3:00pm	Meakin Park	Josh Vernon
Redcliffe Dolphins (R)	22 – 18	Carina Tigers	Saturday, 21 June, 5:00pm	Kayo Stadium	Nick McEwan
Fortitude Valley Diehards	18 – 26	Wynnum Manly Seagulls (R)	Saturday, 21 June, 6:30pm	Emerson Park	Byron Cook
Souths Logan Magpies (R)		BYE
Round 14
Fortitude Valley Diehards	16 – 28	Souths Logan Magpies (R)	Saturday, 28 June, 3:00pm	Emerson Park	Byron Cook
Carina Tigers	30 – 10	Logan Pride	Saturday, 28 June, 3:00pm	Leo Williams Oval	Jordan Morel
Wynnum Manly Seagulls (R)	30 – 26	Redcliffe Dolphins (R)	Sunday, 29 June, 1:15pm	BMD Kougari Oval	Nick McEwan
West Brisbane Panthers		BYE
Round 15
Souths Logan Magpies (R)	14 – 46	West Brisbane Panthers	Saturday, 12 July, 3:00pm	Brandon Park	Byron Cook
Carina Tigers	40 – 18	Wynnum Manly Seagulls (R)	Saturday, 12 July, 3:00pm	Leo Williams Oval	Nick McEwan
Logan Pride	22 – 28	Redcliffe Dolphins (R)	Saturday, 12 July, 3:00pm	Meakin Park	Josh Vernon
Fortitude Valley Diehards		BYE
Round 16
West Brisbane Panthers	24 – 16	Wynnum Manly Seagulls (R)	Saturday, 19 July, 1:40pm	Bishop Park	Nick McEwan
Redcliffe Dolphins (R)	6 – 6	Souths Logan Magpies (R)	Saturday, 19 July, 3:00pm	Kayo Stadium	Byron Cook
Logan Pride	10 – 42	Fortitude Valley Diehards	Saturday, 19 July, 3:00pm	Meakin Park	Josh Vernon
Carina Tigers		BYE
Round 17
Fortitude Valley Diehards	14 – 23	Redcliffe Dolphins (R)	Saturday, 26 July, 3:00pm	Emerson Park	Byron Cook
Wynnum Manly Seagulls (R)	40 – 14	Souths Logan Magpies (R)	Saturday, 26 July, 3:00pm	Kitchener Park	Josh Vernon
West Brisbane Panthers	10 – 20	Carina Tigers	Saturday, 26 July, 4:30pm	Frank Lind Oval	Cody Kwik
Logan Pride		BYE
Round 18
Carina Tigers	30 – 18	Fortitude Valley Diehards	Saturday, 2 August, 3:00pm	Leo Williams Oval	Josh Vernon
Logan Pride	24 – 24	Wynnum Manly Seagulls (R)	Saturday, 2 August, 3:00pm	Meakin Park	Cody Kwik
Redcliffe Dolphins (R)	10 – 20	West Brisbane Panthers	Saturday, 2 August, 4:30pm	Jim Lawrie Oval	Byron Cook
Souths Logan Magpies (R)		BYE
Round 19
Carina Tigers	14 – 20	Redcliffe Dolphins (R)	Saturday, 9 August, 3:00pm	Leo Williams Oval	Cody Kwik
West Brisbane Panthers	20 – 18	Logan Pride	Saturday, 9 August, 4:30pm	Frank Lind Oval	Josh Vernon
Souths Logan Magpies (R)	30 – 22	Fortitude Valley Diehards	Sunday, 10 August, 11:30am	Davies Park	Jacob Gregg
Wynnum Manly Seagulls (R)		BYE
Round 20
Fortitude Valley Diehards	12 – 34	West Brisbane Panthers	Saturday, 16 August, 3:00pm	Emerson Park	Sam Kalpakadis
Logan Pride	34 – 28	Souths Logan Magpies (R)	Saturday, 16 August, 3:00pm	Meakin Park	Byron Cook
Wynnum Manly Seagulls (R)	38 – 24	Carina Tigers	Sunday, 17 August, 3:00pm	BMD Kougari Oval	Isaac Freeman
Redcliffe Dolphins (R)		BYE
Round 21
Fortitude Valley Diehards	22 – 30	Wynnum Manly Seagulls (R)	Saturday, 23 August, 3:00pm	Emerson Park	Byron Cook
Redcliffe Dolphins (R)	50 – 12	Logan Pride	Saturday, 23 August, 3:00pm	Kayo Stadium	Sam Kalpakadis
Souths Logan Magpies (R)	18 – 48	Carina Tigers	Sunday, 24 August, 1:00pm	Davies Park	Cody Kwik
West Brisbane Panthers		BYE
Finals Series
Major & Minor Semi-Finals
West Brisbane Panthers	57 – 18	Wynnum Manly Seagulls (R)	Saturday, 6 September, 2:00pm	Bishop Park	Cody Kwik
Redcliffe Dolphins (R)	10 – 6	Carina Tigers	Saturday, 6 September, 4:00pm	Kayo Stadium	Byron Cook
Preliminary Final
Carina Tigers	23 – 22	West Brisbane Panthers	Saturday, 13 September, 3:00pm	Leo Williams Oval	Nick McEwan
Grand Final
Redcliffe Dolphins (R)	V	Carina Tigers	Saturday, 20 September, 3:00pm	BMD Kougari Oval	TBA

==== Grand Final ====
Semi-Finals
1	Redcliffe	10
2	Carina	6
3	West Brisbane	57
4	Wynnum Manly	18

Preliminary Final
2	Carina	23
3	West Brisbane	22

Grand Final
1	Redcliffe
2	Carina

2025 Brisbane Premiership Grand Final

Saturday, 20 September 2025
3:00pm

Redcliffe Dolphins (R)	v	Carina Tigers

BMD Kougari Oval, Brisbane

=== Gold Coast Premiership ===
The Gold Coast Premiership (named the Earth Fleet Cup for sponsorship reasons) is a Gold Coast based men's first grade rugby league competition that features teams from the QRL South East Division. This competition feeds into the Burleigh Bears Queensland Cup team.

==== Teams ====
The lineup for 2025 is currently unconfirmed. Currently listed are teams that competed in 2024.

Colours	Club	QLD Cup Affiliate	Home ground(s)	Head coach
	Burleigh Bears (R)		UAA Park	TBA
	Currumbin Eagles	Burleigh Bears	Merv Craig Sporting Complex	TBA
	Helensvale Hornets	Burleigh Bears	Robert Dalley Park	TBA
	Runaway Bay Seagulls	Burleigh Bears	Bycroft Oval	TBA
	Southport Tigers	Burleigh Bears	Owen Park	TBA
	Tugun Seahawks	Burleigh Bears	Betty Diamond Sports Complex	TBA

Queensland State Map	Gold Coast Map
Home Venues	Home Venues

==== Ladder ====
Pos	Team	Pld	W	D	L	B	PF	PA	PD	Pts	Qualification
1	Burleigh Bears (R)	17	17	0	0	0	720	180	+540	34	Minor Premiers & Major Semi-Final
2	Currumbin Eagles	17	10	0	7	0	584	310	+274	20	Qualifying Final
3	Tugun Seahawks	17	10	0	7	0	568	350	+218	20	Qualifying Final
4	Runaway Bay Seagulls	17	8	1	8	0	492	462	+30	17	Elimination Final
5	Helensvale Hornets	17	5	1	11	0	508	462	+46	11	Elimination Final
6	Southport Tigers	17	0	0	17	0	86	1194	-1108	0	

Updated to match(es) played on 1 September. Source:
Rules for classification: 1) points; 2) point difference; 3) points scored

===== Ladder progression =====
- Numbers highlighted in green indicate that the team finished the round inside the top 5.
- Numbers highlighted in blue indicates the team finished first on the ladder in that round.
- Numbers highlighted in red indicates the team finished last place on the ladder in that round.
- Underlined numbers indicate that the team had a bye during that round.

Pos	Team	1	2	3	4	5	6	7	8	9	10	11	12	13	14	15	16	17
1	Burleigh Bears (R)	2	4	6	8	10	12	14	16	18	20	22	24	26	28	30	32	34
2	Currumbin Eagles	2	2	2	4	6	8	10	10	12	12	14	14	14	14	16	18	20
3	Tugun Seahawks	2	4	6	6	8	10	10	10	10	12	12	14	16	16	18	18	20
4	Runaway Bay Seagulls	0	2	4	4	4	4	6	8	8	8	10	11	13	15	15	17	17
5	Helensvale Hornets	0	0	0	2	2	2	2	4	6	8	8	9	9	11	11	11	11
6	Southport Tigers	0	0	0	0	0	0	0	0	0	0	0	0	0	0	0	0	0

Season Results:

Home	Score	Away	Match Information
Home	Score	Away	Date and Time	Venue	Referee	Video
Round 1
Tugan Seahawks	34 – 12	Runaway Bay Seagulls	Saturday, 5 April, 3:00pm	Betty Diamond Sports Complex	TBA
Currumbin Eagles	48 – 0	Southport Tigers	Saturday, 5 April, 5:00pm	Merv Craig Sporting Complex	TBA
Burleigh Bears (R)	42 – 10	Helensvale Hornets	Sunday, 6 April, 2:00pm	UAA Park	TBA
Round 2
Currumbin Eagles	18 – 20	Tugun Seahawks	Sunday, 13 April, 3:00pm	Merv Craig Sporting Complex	TBA
Helensvale Hornets	30 – 32	Runaway Bay Seagulls	Sunday, 13 April, 3:00pm	Robert Dalley Park	TBA
Southport Tigers	0 – 90	Burleigh Bears (R)	Sunday, 13 April, 3:00pm	Owen Park	TBA
Round 3 (ANZAC Round)
Runaway Bay Seagulls	46 – 12	Southport Tigers	Sunday, 27 April, 3:00pm	Bycroft Oval	TBA
Currumbin Eagles	16 – 28	Burleigh Bears (R)	Sunday, 27 April, 3:00pm	Merv Craig Sporting Complex	TBA
Helensvale Hornets	20 – 22	Tugun Seahawks	Sunday, 27 April, 3:00pm	Robert Dalley Park	TBA
Round 4
Currumbin Eagles	24 – 10	Runaway Bay Seagulls	Saturday, 10 May, 3:00pm	Merv Craig Sporting Complex	TBA
Tugan Seahawks	20 – 24	Burleigh Bears (R)	Sunday, 11 May, 3:00pm	Betty Diamond Sports Complex	TBA
Southport Tigers	8 – 76	Helensvale Hornets	Sunday, 11 May, 3:00pm	Owen Park	TBA
Round 5
Runaway Bay Seagulls	16 – 30	Burleigh Bears (R)	Saturday, 17 May, 3:00pm	Bycroft Oval	TBA
Helensvale Hornets	10 – 18	Currumbin Eagles	Saturday, 17 May, 3:00pm	Robert Dalley Park	TBA
Tugan Seahawks	84 – 6	Southport Tigers	Sunday, 18 May, 3:00pm	Betty Diamond Sports Complex	TBA
Round 6
Runaway Bay Seagulls	12 – 30	Tugun Seahawks	Sunday, 25 May, 3:00pm	Bycroft Oval	TBA
Southport Tigers	10 – 64	Currumbin Eagles	Sunday, 25 May, 3:00pm	Owen Park	TBA
Helensvale Hornets	14 – 46	Burleigh Bears (R)	Sunday, 25 May, 3:00pm	Robert Dalley Park	TBA
Round 7
Tugan Seahawks	26 – 32	Currumbin Eagles	Saturday, 31 May, 3:00pm	Betty Diamond Sports Complex	TBA
Runaway Bay Seagulls	36 – 34	Helensvale Hornets	Saturday, 31 May, 3:00pm	Bycroft Oval	TBA
Burleigh Bears (R)	110 – 0	Southport Tigers	Sunday, 1 June, 3:00pm	UAA Park	TBA
Round 8
Tugan Seahawks	16 – 34	Helensvale Hornets	Sunday, 8 June, 3:00pm	Betty Diamond Sports Complex	TBA
Southport Tigers	6 – 70	Runaway Bay Seagulls	Sunday, 8 June, 3:00pm	Firth Park	TBA
Burleigh Bears (R)	34 – 28	Currumbin Eagles	Sunday, 8 June, 3:00pm	UAA Park	TBA
Round 9
Runaway Bay Seagulls	14 – 28	Currumbin Eagles	Sunday, 15 June, 3:00pm	Bycroft Oval	TBA
Helensvale Hornets	64 – 8	Southport Tigers	Sunday, 15 June, 3:00pm	Robert Dalley Park	TBA
Burleigh Bears (R)	34 – 12	Tugun Seahawks	Sunday, 15 June, 3:00pm	UAA Park	TBA
Round 10
Runaway Bay Seagulls	0 – 40	Burleigh Bears (R)	Sunday, 22 June, 3:00pm	Bycroft Oval	TBA
Currumbin Eagles	14 – 46	Helensvale Hornets	Sunday, 22 June, 3:00pm	Merv Craig Sporting Complex	TBA
Southport Tigers	0 – 62	Tugun Seahawks	Sunday, 22 June, 3:00pm	Owen Park	TBA
Round 11
Tugan Seahawks	24 – 26	Runaway Bay Seagulls	Sunday, 29 June, 3:00pm	Betty Diamond Sports Complex	TBA
Currumbin Eagles	66 – 0	Southport Tigers	Sunday, 29 June, 3:00pm	Merv Craig Sporting Complex	TBA
Burleigh Bears (R)	34 – 10	Helensvale Hornets	Sunday, 29 June, 3:00pm	UAA Park	TBA
Round 12
Helensvale Hornets	30 – 30	Runaway Bay Seagulls	Saturday, 12 July, 3:00pm	Robert Dalley Park	TBA
Currumbin Eagles	12 – 32	Tugun Seahawks	Saturday, 12 July, 5:00pm	Merv Craig Sporting Complex	TBA
Southport Tigers	0 – 82	Burleigh Bears (R)	Sunday, 13 July, 3:00pm	Owen Park	TBA
Round 13
Runaway Bay Seagulls	82 – 10	Southport Tigers	Sunday, 20 July, 3:00pm	Bycroft Oval	TBA
Helensvale Hornets	20 – 26	Tugun Seahawks	Sunday, 20 July, 3:00pm	Robert Dalley Park	TBA
Burleigh Bears (R)	22 – 14	Currumbin Eagles	Sunday, 20 July, 3:30pm	UAA Park	TBA
Round 14
Tugan Seahawks	12 – 18	Burleigh Bears (R)	Saturday, 26 July, 3:00pm	Betty Diamond Sports Complex	TBA
Currumbin Eagles	14 – 36	Runaway Bay Seagulls	Sunday, 27 July, 3:30pm	Merv Craig Sporting Complex	TBA
Southport Tigers	16 – 62	Helensvale Hornets	Sunday, 27 July, 3:30pm	Owen Park	TBA
Round 15
Burleigh Bears (R)	48 – 0	Runaway Bay Seagulls	Saturday, 9 August, 3:00pm	UAA Park	TBA
Tugan Seahawks	78 – 10	Southport Tigers	Sunday, 10 August, 3:00pm	Betty Diamond Sports Complex	TBA
Helensvale Hornets	16 – 40	Currumbin Eagles	Sunday, 10 August, 3:00pm	Robert Dalley Park	TBA
Round 16
Burleigh Bears (R)	38 – 28	Tugun Seahawks	Saturday, 16 August, 3:00pm	UAA Park	TBA
Runaway Bay Seagulls	36 – 26	Helensvale Hornets	Sunday, 17 August, 3:00pm	Bycroft Oval	TBA
Southport Tigers	0 – 110	Currumbin Eagles	Sunday, 17 August, 3:00pm	Owen Park	TBA
Round 17
Currumbin Eagles	38 – 6	Helensvale Hornets	Saturday, 23 August, 3:00pm	Merv Craig Sporting Complex	TBA
Runaway Bay Seagulls	34 – 42	Tugun Seahawks	Sunday, 24 August, 3:00pm	Bycroft Oval	TBA
Burleigh Bears (R)	0* – 0	Southport Tigers	N/A
Finals Series
Qualifying & Elimination Finals
Runaway Bay Seagulls	28 – 22	Helensvale Hornets	Saturday, 30 August, 3:00pm	Bycroft Oval	TBA
Currumbin Eagles	32 – 20	Tugun Seahawks	Sunday, 31 August, 3:00pm	Merv Craig Sporting Complex	TBA
Major & Minor Semi-Finals
Tugan Seahawks	38 – 24	Runaway Bay Seagulls	Saturday, 6 September, 3:00pm	Betty Diamond Sports Complex	TBA
Burleigh Bears (R)	36 – 22	Currumbin Eagles	Sunday, 7 September, 3:00pm	UAA Park	TBA
Preliminary Final
Currumbin Eagles	18 – 19	Tugun Seahawks	Sunday, 14 September, 3:00pm	Merv Craig Sporting Complex	TBA
Grand Final
Burleigh Bears (R)	V	Tugun Seahawks	Saturday, 20 September, 4:00pm	Owen Park	TBA

==== Grand Final ====
Qualifying & Elimination Finals
2	Currumbin	32
3	Tugan	20
4	Runaway Bay	28
5	Helensvale	22

Major Semi-Final
1	Burleigh	36
2	Currumbin	22
Minor Semi-Final
3	Tugan	38
4	Runaway Bay	24

Preliminary Final
2	Currumbin	18
3	Tugan	19

Grand Final
1	Burleigh
3	Tugan

2025 Gold Coast Premiership Grand Final

Saturday, 20 September 2025
4:00pm

Burleigh Bears (R)	v	Tugan Seahawks

Owen Park, Gold Coast

=== Ipswich Premiership ===
The Ipswich Premiership (named the Ipswich Jets Cup) is a Brisbane based men's first grade rugby league competition that features teams from the QRL South East Division. This competition feeds into the Ipswich Jets Queensland Cup team.

==== Teams ====
In December 2024, Ipswich Swifts announced they were entering an agreement with West End Bulldogs which would see them drop out of the 2025 First Grade competition and act as a feeder club for the Bulldogs.

Colours	Club	QLD Cup Affiliate	Home ground(s)	Head coach
	Fassifern Bombers	Ipswich Jets	Hayes Oval	TBA
	Ipswich Brothers	Ipswich Jets	Blue Ribbon Motors Field	TBA
	Ipswich Jets (R)		North Ipswich Reserve	TBA
	Norths Tigers	Ipswich Jets	Keith Sternberg Oval	TBA
	Redbank Plains Bears	Ipswich Jets	Redbank Plains Recreational Reserve	TBA
	West End Bulldogs	Ipswich Jets	Daniels Park	TBA

==== Ladder ====
Pos	Team	Pld	W	D	L	B	PF	PA	PD	Pts	Qualification
1	Redbank Plains Bears	15	11	1	3	0	524	262	+262	23	Minor Premiers & Major Semi-Final
2	Ipswich Jets (R)	15	10	1	4	0	510	284	+216	21	Major Semi-Final
3	Ipswich Brothers	15	7	2	6	0	381	338	+43	16	Minor Semi-Final
4	Fassifern Bombers	15	6	0	9	0	296	532	-236	12	Minor Semi-Final
5	Norths Tigers	15	4	2	9	0	318	446	-128	10	
6	West End Bulldogs	15	4	0	11	0	348	505	-157	8	

Updated to match(es) played on 1 September. Source:
Rules for classification: 1) points; 2) point difference; 3) points scored

===== Ladder progression =====
- Numbers highlighted in green indicate that the team finished the round inside the top 4.
- Numbers highlighted in blue indicates the team finished first on the ladder in that round.
- Numbers highlighted in red indicates the team finished last place on the ladder in that round.
- Underlined numbers indicate that the team had a bye during that round.

Pos	Team	1	2	3	4	5	6	7	8	9	10	11	12	13	14	15
1	Redbank Plains Bears	1	3	3	5	5	7	9	11	13	13	15	17	19	21	23
2	Ipswich Jets (R)	0	2	2	4	6	6	8	10	12	14	15	17	19	21	21
3	Ipswich Brothers	2	4	4	4	6	8	9	9	9	9	10	12	14	14	16
4	Fassifern Bombers	2	2	4	6	6	8	8	8	8	10	10	10	10	12	12
5	Norths Tigers	1	1	3	3	5	5	6	6	8	8	8	8	8	8	10
6	West End Bulldogs	0	0	2	2	2	2	2	4	4	6	8	8	8	8	8

Season Results:

Home	Score	Away	Match Information
Home	Score	Away	Date and Time	Venue	Referee	Video
Round 1 (ANZAC Round)
West End Bulldogs	18 – 48	Fassifern Bombers	Saturday, 26 April, 2:30pm	North Ipswich Reserve	TBA
Norths Tigers	30 – 30	Redbank Plains Bears	Saturday, 26 April, 4:15pm	North Ipswich Reserve	TBA
Ipswich Jets (R)	18 – 32	Ipswich Brothers	Saturday, 26 April, 6:00pm	North Ipswich Reserve	TBA
Round 2
Redbank Plains Bears	42 – 16	West End Bulldogs	Saturday, 10 May, 6:00pm	Redbank Plains Recreational Reserve	TBA
Ipswich Jets (R)	20 – 8	Fassifern Bombers	Sunday, 11 May, 12:20pm	North Ipswich Reserve	TBA
Ipswich Brothers	28 – 16	Norths Tigers	Sunday, 11 May, 4:00pm	Blue Ribbon Motors Field	TBA
Round 3
West End Bulldogs	30 – 20	Ipswich Brothers	Saturday, 17 May, 6:00pm	Daniels Park	TBA
Norths Tigers	24 – 20	Ipswich Jets (R)	Saturday, 17 May, 6:00pm	Keith Sternberg Oval	TBA
Fassifern Bombers	28 – 26	Redbank Plains Bears	Sunday, 18 May, 3:00pm	Hayes Oval	TBA
Round 4
West End Bulldogs	14 – 34	Ipswich Jets (R)	Saturday, 24 May, 6:00pm	Daniels Park	TBA
Redbank Plains Bears	32 – 6	Ipswich Brothers	Saturday, 24 May, 6:00pm	Redbank Plains Recreational Reserve	TBA
Fassifern Bombers	26 – 18	Norths Tigers	Sunday, 25 May, 3:00pm	Hayes Oval	TBA
Round 5
Ipswich Brothers	30 – 10	Fassifern Bombers	Saturday, 31 May, 6:00pm	Blue Ribbon Motors Field	TBA
Norths Tigers	18 – 16	West End Bulldogs	Saturday, 31 May, 6:00pm	Keith Sternberg Oval	TBA
Ipswich Jets (R)	30 – 20	Redbank Plains Bears	Sunday, 1 June, 12:10pm	North Ipswich Reserve	TBA
Round 6
Fassifern Bombers	40 – 34	West End Bulldogs	Saturday, 7 June, 6:00pm	Hayes Oval	TBA
Ipswich Brothers	30 – 26	Ipswich Jets (R)	Sunday, 8 June, 3:00pm	Blue Ribbon Motors Field	TBA
Redbank Plains Bears	32 – 0	Norths Tigers	Sunday, 8 June, 3:00pm	Redbank Plains Recreational Reserve	TBA
Round 7
West End Bulldogs	20 – 26	Redbank Plains Bears	Saturday, 14 June, 6:00pm	Daniels Park	TBA
Norths Tigers	12 – 12	Ipswich Brothers	Saturday, 14 June, 6:00pm	Keith Sternberg Oval	TBA
Fassifern Bombers	16 – 58	Ipswich Jets (R)	Sunday, 15 June, 3:00pm	Hayes Oval	TBA
Round 8
Redbank Plains Bears	32 – 10	Fassifern Bombers	Saturday, 28 June, 6:00pm	Redbank Plains Recreational Reserve	TBA
Ipswich Jets (R)	44 – 20	Norths Tigers	Sunday, 29 June, 12:10pm	North Ipswich Reserve	TBA
Ipswich Brothers	21 – 22	West End Bulldogs	Sunday, 29 June, 3:00pm	Blue Ribbon Motors Field	TBA
Round 9
Ipswich Brothers	18 – 60	Redbank Plains Bears	Saturday, 12 July, 6:00pm	Blue Ribbon Motors Field	TBA
Norths Tigers	58 – 16	Fassifern Bombers	Saturday, 12 July, 6:00pm	Keith Sternberg Oval	TBA
Ipswich Jets (R)	58 – 18	West End Bulldogs	Sunday, 13 July, 12:20pm	North Ipswich Reserve	TBA
Round 10
West End Bulldogs	40 – 16	Norths Tigers	Saturday, 19 July, 6:00pm	Daniels Park	TBA
Redbank Plains Bears	12 – 26	Ipswich Jets (R)	Saturday, 19 July, 6:00pm	Redbank Plains Recreational Reserve	TBA
Fassifern Bombers	32 – 24	Ipswich Brothers	Sunday, 20 July, 3:00pm	Hayes Oval	TBA
Round 11
West End Bulldogs	16 – 4	Fassifern Bombers	Saturday, 26 July, 6:00pm	Daniels Park	TBA
Norths Tigers	4 – 42	Redbank Plains Bears	Saturday, 26 July, 6:00pm	North Ipswich Reserve	TBA
Ipswich Jets (R)	0 – 0*	Ipswich Brothers	Washout
Round 12
Ipswich Brothers	54 – 16	Norths Tigers	Saturday, 2 August, 5:00pm	Blue Ribbon Motors Field	TBA
Redbank Plains Bears	38 – 26	West End Bulldogs	Saturday, 2 August, 6:00pm	Redbank Plains Recreational Reserve	TBA
Ipswich Jets (R)	82 – 12	Fassifern Bombers	Sunday, 3 August, 3:00pm	Bob Gibbs Oval	TBA
Round 13
Fassifern Bombers	12 – 58	Redbank Plains Bears	Saturday, 9 August, 6:00pm	Hayes Oval	TBA
Norths Tigers	16 – 26	Ipswich Jets (R)	Saturday, 9 August, 6:00pm	Keith Sternberg Oval	TBA
West End Bulldogs	16 – 52	Ipswich Brothers	Sunday, 10 August, 3:00pm	Daniels Park	TBA
Round 14
West End Bulldogs	30 – 34	Ipswich Jets (R)	Saturday, 16 August, 6:00pm	Daniels Park	TBA
Fassifern Bombers	28 – 26	Norths Tigers	Saturday, 16 August, 6:00pm	Hayes Oval	TBA
Redbank Plains Bears	42 – 22	Ipswich Brothers	Saturday, 16 August, 6:00pm	Redbank Plains Recreational Reserve	TBA
Round 15
Ipswich Jets (R)	14 – 32	Redbank Plains Bears	Saturday, 23 August, 12:20pm	North Ipswich Reserve	TBA
Norths Tigers	44 – 32	West End Bulldogs	Saturday, 23 August, 6:00pm	Keith Sternberg Oval	TBA
Ipswich Brothers	32 – 6	Fassifern Bombers	Sunday, 24 August, 3:00pm	Blue Ribbon Motors Field	TBA
Finals Series
Major & Minor Semi-Finals
Redbank Plains Bears	24 – 38	Ipswich Jets (R)	Saturday, 30 August, 7:30pm	North Ipswich Reserve	TBA
Ipswich Brothers	28 – 22	Fassifern Bombers	Sunday, 31 August, 3:00pm	North Ipswich Reserve	TBA
Preliminary Final
Redbank Plains Bears	28 – 20	Ipswich Brothers	Sunday, 7 September, 4:00pm	North Ipswich Reserve	TBA
Grand Final
Ipswich Jets (R)	V	Redbank Plains Bears	Sunday, 14 September, 3:30pm	North Ipswich Reserve	TBA

==== Grand Final ====
Semi-Finals
1	Redbank Plains	24
2	Ipswich	38
3	Ipswich	28
4	Fassifern	22

Preliminary Final
1	Redbank Plains	28
3	Ipswich	20

Grand Final
2	Ipswich
1	Redbank Plains

2025 Ipswich Premiership Grand Final

Sunday, 14 September 2025
3:30pm

Ipswich Jets (R)	v	Redbank Plains Bears

North Ipswich Reserve, Brisbane

== New South Wales ==
=== Northern Rivers Regional Premiership ===
The Northern Rivers Regional Premiership (named the NRRRL Cup) is a second tier men's Rugby League competition in New South Wales. It is the top semi-professional competition in the Northern Rivers region. Despite being administered by the New South Wales Rugby League, the competition feeds into the New South Wales based Tweed Heads Seagulls.

==== Teams ====
The competition will feature 1 addition for 2025 with the Tweed Heads Seagulls electing to field their reserve side in the competition.

Colours	Club	QLD Cup Affiliate	Home ground(s)	Head coach
	Ballina Seagulls	Tweed Heads Seagulls	Kingsford Smith Park	TBA
	Bilambil Jets	Tweed Heads Seagulls	Bilambil East Sports Field	TBA
	Byron Bay Red Devils	Tweed Heads Seagulls	Red Devil Park	TBA
	Casino RSM Cougars	Tweed Heads Seagulls	Queen Elizabeth Park	TBA
	Cudgen Hornets	Tweed Heads Seagulls	Ned Byrne Oval	TBA
	Evans Head Bombers	Tweed Heads Seagulls	Stan Payne Oval	TBA
	Kyogle Turkeys	Tweed Heads Seagulls	New Park	TBA
	Lower Clarence Magpies	Tweed Heads Seagulls	Yamba Sporting Complex	TBA
	Lismore Marist Brothers Rams	Tweed Heads Seagulls	Crozier Field	TBA
	Mullumbimby Giants	Tweed Heads Seagulls	Mullumbimby Oval	TBA
	Murwillumbah Mustangs	Tweed Heads Seagulls	Murwillumbah Oval	TBA
	Northern United Dirawongs	Tweed Heads Seagulls	Crozier Field	TBA
	Tweed Coast Raiders	Tweed Heads Seagulls	Les Burger Field	TBA
	Tweed Heads Seagulls (R)		Piggabeen Sports Complex	Craig Field

State Map	Mullumbimby Map
Home Venues	Home Venues

==== Ladder ====
Pos	Team	Pld	W	D	L	B	PF	PA	PD	Pts	Qualification
1	Cudgen Hornets	16	14	1	1	0	508	226	+282	29	Minor Premiers & Major Semi-Final
2	Lismore Marist Brothers Rams	16	12	1	3	0	434	252	+182	25	Major Semi-Final
3	Bilambil Jets	16	12	0	4	0	482	271	+211	24	Elimination Finals
4	Ballina Seagulls	16	10	1	5	0	430	226	+204	21	Elimination Finals
5	Murwillumbah Mustangs	16	9	2	5	0	370	326	+44	20	Elimination Finals
6	Casino RSM Cougars	16	9	1	6	0	438	329	+109	19	Elimination Finals
7	Mullumbimby Giants	16	8	1	7	0	369	337	+32	17	
8	Evans Head Bombers	16	6	2	8	0	354	386	–32	14	
9	Tweed Heads Seagulls (R)	16	6	1	9	0	356	358	–2	13	
10	Kyogle Turkeys	16	6	1	9	0	350	453	-103	13	
11	Tweed Coast Raiders	16	5	2	9	0	292	442	-150	12	
12	Lower Clarence Magpies	16	4	1	11	0	260	382	-122	9	
13	Northern United Dirawongs	16	2	0	14	0	340	608	-268	4	
14	Byron Bay Red Devils	16	2	0	14	0	226	609	-385	4	

Updated to match(es) played on 1 September. Source:
Rules for classification: 1) points; 2) point difference; 3) points scored

===== Ladder progression =====
- Numbers highlighted in green indicate that the team finished the round inside the top 6.
- Numbers highlighted in blue indicates the team finished first on the ladder in that round.
- Numbers highlighted in red indicates the team finished last place on the ladder in that round.
- Underlined numbers indicate that the team had a bye during that round.

Pos	Team	2	6	7	1	8	9	10	11	12	4	3	13	14	15	5	16
1	Cudgen Hornets	4	12	14	14	16	16	18	20	22	22	22	24	25	27	27	29
2	Lismore Marist Brothers Rams	2	3	3	7	9	11	13	15	17	17	19	21	21	21	23	25
3	Bilambil Jets	4	10	12	12	14	14	14	14	14	14	14	16	18	20	22	24
4	Ballina Seagulls	0	4	5	5	7	9	11	13	15	15	15	17	17	19	19	21
5	Murwillumbah Mustangs	2	4	5	5	7	7	9	11	11	11	11	13	15	17	19	20
6	Casino RSM Cougars	0	3	5	5	5	7	9	9	11	11	11	13	15	17	17	19
7	Mullumbimby Giants	4	6	7	7	7	7	9	9	11	11	11	13	13	15	15	17
8	Evans Head Bombers	2	8	9	9	11	11	11	11	12	12	12	12	14	14	14	14
9	Tweed Heads Seagulls (R)	0	2	2	2	4	6	6	8	10	12	12	12	13	13	13	13
10	Kyogle Turkeys	4	6	6	6	6	8	8	10	11	11	11	11	11	11	13	13
11	Tweed Coast Raiders	2	4	4	4	4	6	7	9	9	9	9	9	11	11	11	12
12	Lower Clarence Magpies	0	2	4	4	4	6	7	7	7	7	7	7	9	9	9	9
13	Northern United Dirawongs	0	0	0	0	0	0	0	0	0	2	2	2	2	2	4	4
14	Byron Bay Red Devils	0	0	2	2	2	2	2	2	2	2	2	2	2	4	4	4

Season Results:

Home	Score	Away	Match Information
Home	Score	Away	Date and Time	Venue	Referee	Video
Round 1
Bilambil Jets	40 – 6	Tweed Coast Raiders	Sunday, 6 April, 2:45pm	Bilambil East Sports Field	TBA
Tweed Heads Seagulls (R)	18 – 22	Mullumbimby Giants	Sunday, 6 April, 2:45pm	Piggabeen Sports Complex	TBA
Kyogle Turkeys	22 – 18	Lower Clarence Magpies	Sunday, 6 April, 2:45pm	New Park	TBA
Cudgen Hornets	16 – 12	Murwillumbah Mustangs	Sunday, 6 April, 2:45pm	Ned Byrne Oval	TBA
Byron Bay Red Devils	14 – 32	Evans Head Bombers	Sunday, 6 April, 2:45pm	Red Devil Park	TBA
Casino RSM Cougars	22 – 10	Ballina Seagulls	Sunday, 4 May, 2:45pm	Queen Elizabeth Park	TBA
Northern United Dirawongs	14 – 22	Lismore Marist Brothers Rams	Wednesday, 11 June, 7:15pm	Crozier Field	TBA
Round 2
Evans Head Bombers	12 – 24	Bilambil Jets	Saturday, 12 April, 2:45pm	Stan Payne Oval	TBA
Tweed Coast Raiders	24 – 18	Tweed Heads Seagulls (R)	Sunday, 13 April, 2:45pm	Les Burger Field	TBA
Mullumbimby Giants	31 – 10	Casino RSM Cougars	Sunday, 13 April, 2:45pm	Mullumbimby Oval	TBA
Ballina Seagulls	20 – 26	Lismore Marist Brothers Rams	Sunday, 13 April, 2:45pm	Kingsford Smith Park	TBA
Northern United Dirawongs	18 – 40	Kyogle Turkeys	Sunday, 13 April, 2:45pm	Crozier Field	TBA
Lower Clarence Magpies	22 – 44	Cudgen Hornets	Sunday, 13 April, 2:45pm	Yamba Sporting Complex	TBA
Murwillumbah Mustangs	44 – 28	Byron Bay Red Devils	Sunday, 13 April, 2:45pm	Murwillumbah Oval	TBA
Round 3 (ANZAC Round)
Casino RSM Cougars	16 – 20	Tweed Coast Raiders	Sunday, 27 April, 2:45pm	Queen Elizabeth Park	TBA
Kyogle Turkeys	18 – 34	Ballina Seagulls	Sunday, 27 April, 2:45pm	New Park	TBA
Cudgen Hornets	26 – 14	Northern United Dirawongs	Sunday, 27 April, 2:45pm	Ned Byrne Oval	TBA
Byron Bay Red Devils	14 – 36	Lower Clarence Magpies	Sunday, 27 April, 2:45pm	Red Devil Park	TBA
Evans Head Bombers	34 – 20	Murwillumbah Mustangs	Sunday, 27 April, 2:45pm	Stan Payne Oval	TBA
Bilambil Jets	20 – 12	Tweed Heads Seagulls (R)	Sunday, 27 April, 2:45pm	Bilambil East Sports Field	TBA
Lismore Marist Brothers Rams	46 – 12	Mullumbimby Giants	Sunday, 20 July, 2:45pm	Crozier Field	TBA
Round 4 (Women in League Round)
Mullumbimby Giants	21 – 29	Kyogle Turkeys	Sunday, 11 May, 2:45pm	Mullumbimby Oval	TBA
Ballina Seagulls	16 – 20	Cudgen Hornets	Sunday, 11 May, 2:45pm	Kingsford Smith Park	TBA
Lower Clarence Magpies	16 – 32	Evans Head Bombers	Sunday, 11 May, 2:45pm	Yamba Sporting Complex	TBA
Murwillumbah Mustangs	14 – 40	Bilambil Jets	Sunday, 11 May, 2:45pm	Murwillumbah Oval	TBA
Tweed Coast Raiders	6 – 34	Lismore Marist Brothers Rams	Saturday, 7 June, 2:45pm	Piggabeen Sports Complex	TBA
Northern United Dirawongs	58 – 28	Byron Bay Red Devils	Saturday, 19 July, 2:45pm	Crozier Field	TBA
Tweed Heads Seagulls (R)	58 – 24	Casino RSM Cougars	Saturday, 19 July, 2:45pm	Piggabeen Sports Complex	TBA
Round 5
Cudgen Hornets	64 – 10	Mullumbimby Giants	Sunday, 18 May, 2:45pm	Ned Byrne Oval	TBA
Byron Bay Red Devils	0 – 36	Ballina Seagulls	Sunday, 18 May, 2:45pm	Red Devil Park	TBA
Evans Head Bombers	38 – 44	Northern United Dirawongs	Saturday, 16 August, 2:45pm	Stan Payne Oval	TBA
Kyogle Turkeys	30 – 28	Tweed Coast Raiders	Sunday, 17 August, 2:45pm	New Park	TBA
Murwillumbah Mustangs	48 – 10	Lower Clarence Magpies	Sunday, 17 August, 2:45pm	Murwillumbah Oval	TBA
Lismore Marist Brothers Rams	26 – 18	Tweed Heads Seagulls (R)	Sunday, 17 August, 2:45pm	Crozier Field	TBA
Bilambil Jets	22 – 18	Casino RSM Cougars	Sunday, 17 August, 2:45pm	Bilambil East Sports Field	TBA
Round 6
Ballina Seagulls	20 – 24	Evans Head Bombers	Saturday, 24 May, 2:45pm	Kingsford Smith Park	TBA
Tweed Coast Raiders	0 – 42	Cudgen Hornets	Sunday, 25 May, 2:45pm	Les Burger Field	TBA
Mullumbimby Giants	27 – 12	Byron Bay Red Devils	Sunday, 25 May, 2:45pm	Mullumbimby Oval	TBA
Northern United Dirawongs	22 – 32	Murwillumbah Mustangs	Sunday, 25 May, 2:45pm	Crozier Field	TBA
Lower Clarence Magpies	12 – 24	Bilambil Jets	Sunday, 25 May, 2:45pm	Yamba Sporting Complex	TBA
Tweed Heads Seagulls (R)	30 – 26	Kyogle Turkeys	Sunday, 25 May, 2:45pm	Piggabeen Sports Complex	TBA
Casino RSM Cougars	16 – 16	Lismore Marist Brothers Rams	Sunday, 25 May, 2:45pm	Queen Elizabeth Park	TBA
Round 7
Evans Head Bombers	18 – 18	Mullumbimby Giants	Saturday, 31 May, 2:45pm	Stan Payne Oval	TBA
Byron Bay Red Devils	24 – 14	Tweed Coast Raiders	Sunday, 1 June, 2:45pm	Red Devil Park	TBA
Murwillumbah Mustangs	8 – 8	Ballina Seagulls	Sunday, 1 June, 2:45pm	Murwillumbah Oval	TBA
Lower Clarence Magpies	28 – 16	Northern United Dirawongs	Sunday, 1 June, 2:45pm	Yamba Sporting Complex	TBA
Tweed Heads Seagulls (R)	12 – 18	Cudgen Hornets	Sunday, 1 June, 2:45pm	Piggabeen Sports Complex	TBA
Kyogle Turkeys	14 – 16	Casino RSM Cougars	Sunday, 1 June, 2:45pm	New Park	TBA
Lismore Marist Brothers Rams	24 – 26	Bilambil Jets	Sunday, 1 June, 2:45pm	Crozier Field	TBA
Round 8
Lismore Marist Brothers Rams	32 – 6	Kyogle Turkeys	Saturday, 14 June, 4:25pm	Crozier Field	TBA
Ballina Seagulls	28 – 4	Lower Clarence Magpies	Saturday, 14 June, 5:00pm	Kingsford Smith Park	TBA
Tweed Coast Raiders	10 – 24	Evans Head Bombers	Sunday, 15 June, 2:45pm	Les Burger Field	TBA
Mullumbimby Giants	18 – 20	Murwillumbah Mustangs	Sunday, 15 June, 2:45pm	Mullumbimby Oval	TBA
Bilambil Jets	60 – 18	Northern United Dirawongs	Sunday, 15 June, 2:45pm	Bilambil East Sports Field	TBA
Tweed Heads Seagulls (R)	32 – 12	Byron Bay Red Devils	Sunday, 15 June, 2:45pm	Piggabeen Sports Complex	TBA
Casino RSM Cougars	26 – 28	Cudgen Hornets	Sunday, 15 June, 2:45pm	Queen Elizabeth Park	TBA
Round 9
Murwillumbah Mustangs	22 – 36	Tweed Coast Raiders	Sunday, 22 June, 2:45pm	Murwillumbah Oval	TBA
Lower Clarence Magpies	14 – 10	Mullumbimby Giants	Sunday, 22 June, 2:45pm	Yamba Sporting Complex	TBA
Northern United Dirawongs	16 – 62	Ballina Seagulls	Sunday, 22 June, 2:45pm	Crozier Field	TBA
Evans Head Bombers	18 – 26	Tweed Heads Seagulls (R)	Sunday, 22 June, 2:45pm	Stan Payne Oval	TBA
Byron Bay Red Devils	12 – 36	Casino RSM Cougars	Sunday, 22 June, 2:45pm	Red Devil Park	TBA
Cudgen Hornets	18 – 44	Lismore Marist Brothers Rams	Sunday, 22 June, 2:45pm	Ned Byrne Oval	TBA
Kyogle Turkeys	31 – 16	Bilambil Jets	Sunday, 22 June, 2:45pm	New Park	TBA
Round 10
Casino RSM Cougars	26 – 22	Evans Head Bombers	Saturday, 28 June, 2:45pm	Queen Elizabeth Park	TBA
Kyogle Turkeys	16 – 38	Cudgen Hornets	Saturday, 28 June, 2:45pm	New Park	TBA
Tweed Coast Raiders	18 – 18	Lower Clarence Magpies	Sunday, 29 June, 2:45pm	Piggabeen Sports Complex	TBA
Mullumbimby Giants	38 – 22	Northern United Dirawongs	Sunday, 29 June, 2:45pm	Mullumbimby Oval	TBA
Bilambil Jets	18 – 30	Ballina Seagulls	Sunday, 29 June, 2:45pm	Bilambil East Sports Field	TBA
Tweed Heads Seagulls (R)	20 – 40	Murwillumbah Mustangs	Sunday, 29 June, 2:45pm	Piggabeen Sports Complex	TBA
Lismore Marist Brothers Rams	42 – 6	Byron Bay Red Devils	Sunday, 29 June, 2:45pm	Crozier Field	TBA
Round 11
Northern United Dirawongs	32 – 42	Tweed Coast Raiders	Saturday, 5 July, 2:45pm	Crozier Field	TBA
Ballina Seagulls	14 – 12	Mullumbimby Giants	Sunday, 6 July, 2:45pm	Kingsford Smith Park	TBA
Lower Clarence Magpies	10 – 34	Tweed Heads Seagulls (R)	Sunday, 6 July, 2:45pm	Yamba Sporting Complex	TBA
Murwillumbah Mustangs	28 – 22	Casino RSM Cougars	Sunday, 6 July, 2:45pm	Murwillumbah Oval	TBA
Evans Head Bombers	16 – 38	Lismore Marist Brothers Rams	Sunday, 6 July, 2:45pm	Stan Payne Oval	TBA
Byron Bay Red Devils	14 – 32	Kyogle Turkeys	Sunday, 6 July, 2:45pm	Red Devil Park	TBA
Cudgen Hornets	18 – 14	Bilambil Jets	Sunday, 6 July, 2:45pm	Ned Byrne Oval	TBA
Round 12
Casino RSM Cougars	20 – 14	Lower Clarence Magpies	Saturday, 12 July, 2:45pm	Queen Elizabeth Park	TBA
Kyogle Turkeys	24 – 24	Evans Head Bombers	Saturday, 12 July, 2:45pm	New Park	TBA
Tweed Coast Raiders	10 – 24	Ballina Seagulls	Sunday, 13 July, 2:45pm	Les Burger Field	TBA
Bilambil Jets	16 – 30	Mullumbimby Giants	Sunday, 13 July, 2:45pm	Bilambil East Sports Field	TBA
Tweed Heads Seagulls (R)	32 – 12	Northern United Dirawongs	Sunday, 13 July, 2:45pm	Piggabeen Sports Complex	TBA
Lismore Marist Brothers Rams	34 – 28	Murwillumbah Mustangs	Sunday, 13 July, 2:45pm	Crozier Field	TBA
Cudgen Hornets	54 – 8	Byron Bay Red Devils	Sunday, 13 July, 2:45pm	Ned Byrne Oval	TBA
Round 13
Mullumbimby Giants	38 – 0	Tweed Coast Raiders	Sunday, 27 July, 2:45pm	Mullumbimby Oval	TBA
Ballina Seagulls	38 – 16	Tweed Heads Seagulls (R)	Sunday, 27 July, 2:45pm	Kingsford Smith Park	TBA
Northern United Dirawongs	12 – 56	Casino RSM Cougars	Sunday, 27 July, 2:45pm	Crozier Field	TBA
Lower Clarence Magpies	6 – 30	Lismore Marist Brothers Rams	Sunday, 27 July, 2:45pm	Yamba Sporting Complex	TBA
Murwillumbah Mustangs	28 – 14	Kyogle Turkeys	Sunday, 27 July, 2:45pm	Murwillumbah Oval	TBA
Evans Head Bombers	6 – 26	Cudgen Hornets	Sunday, 27 July, 2:45pm	Stan Payne Oval	TBA
Byron Bay Red Devils	6 – 58	Bilambil Jets	Sunday, 27 July, 2:45pm	Red Devil Park	TBA
Round 14
Mullumbimby Giants	10 – 20	Evans Head Bombers	Saturday, 2 August, 2:45pm	Mullumbimby Oval	TBA
Tweed Coast Raiders	50 – 24	Byron Bay Red Devils	Sunday, 3 August, 2:45pm	Les Burger Field	TBA
Bilambil Jets	28 – 10	Lismore Marist Brothers Rams	Sunday, 3 August, 2:45pm	Bilambil East Sports Field	TBA
Northern United Dirawongs	26 – 40	Lower Clarence Magpies	Sunday, 3 August, 2:45pm	Crozier Field	TBA
Ballina Seagulls	4 – 6	Murwillumbah Mustangs	Sunday, 3 August, 2:45pm	Kingsford Smith Park	TBA
Tweed Heads Seagulls (R)	8 – 8	Cudgen Hornets	Sunday, 3 August, 2:45pm	Piggabeen Sports Complex	TBA
Casino RSM Cougars	50 – 14	Kyogle Turkeys	Sunday, 3 August, 2:45pm	Queen Elizabeth Park	TBA
Round 15 (Indigenous Round)
Lower Clarence Magpies	12 – 16	Casino RSM Cougars	Saturday, 9 August, 2:45pm	Yamba Sporting Complex	TBA
Cudgen Hornets	40 – 8	Tweed Coast Raiders	Sunday, 10 August, 2:45pm	Ned Byrne Oval	TBA
Kyogle Turkeys	18 – 32	Mullumbimby Giants	Sunday, 10 August, 2:45pm	New Park	TBA
Lismore Marist Brothers Rams	10 – 32	Ballina Seagulls	Sunday, 10 August, 2:45pm	Crozier Field	TBA
Evans Head Bombers	10 – 14	Byron Bay Red Devils	Sunday, 10 August, 2:45pm	Stan Payne Oval	TBA
Tweed Heads Seagulls (R)	6 – 20	Bilambil Jets	Sunday, 10 August, 2:45pm	Piggabeen Sports Complex	TBA
Murwillumbah Mustangs	0* – 0	Northern United Dirawongs	N/A
Round 16 (Indigenous Round)
Bilambil Jets	56 – 24	Evans Head Bombers	Saturday, 23 August, 2:45pm	Bilambil East Sports Field	TBA
Ballina Seagulls	54 – 16	Kyogle Turkeys	Sunday, 24 August, 2:45pm	Kingsford Smith Park	TBA
Mullumbimby Giants	40 – 16	Tweed Heads Seagulls (R)	Sunday, 24 August, 2:45pm	Mullumbimby Oval	TBA
Casino RSM Cougars	64 – 16	Northern United Dirawongs	Sunday, 24 August, 2:45pm	Queen Elizabeth Park	TBA
Tweed Coast Raiders	20 – 20	Murwillumbah Mustangs	Sunday, 24 August, 2:45pm	Les Burger Field	TBA
Byron Bay Red Devils	10 – 48	Cudgen Hornets	Sunday, 24 August, 2:45pm	Red Devil Park	TBA
Lismore Marist Brothers Rams	0* – 0	Lower Clarence Magpies	N/A
Finals Series
Elimination Finals
Bilambil Jets	46 – 0	Casino RSM Cougars	Saturday, 30 August, 3:10pm	Bilambil East Sports Field	TBA
Ballina Seagulls	12 – 28	Murwillumbah Mustangs	Sunday, 31 August, 3:10pm	Kingsford Smith Park	TBA
Semi-Finals
Lismore Marist Brothers Rams	20 – 6	Bilambil Jets	Saturday, 6 September, 3:10pm	Crozier Field	TBA
Cudgen Hornets	10 – 38	Murwillumbah Mustangs	Sunday, 7 September, 3:10pm	Ned Byrne Oval	TBA
Grand Final
Lismore Marist Brothers Rams	V	Murwillumbah Mustangs	Sunday, 14 September, 3:10pm	Crozier Field	TBA

==== Grand Final ====
Elimination Finals
4	Ballina	12
5	Murwillumbah	28
3	Bilambil	46
6	Casino RSM	0

Semi-Finals
1	Cudgen	10
5	Murwillumbah	38
2	Lismore Marist Brothers	20
3	Bilambil	6

Grand Final
2	Lismore Marist Brothers
5	Murwillumbah

2025 Northern Rivers Regional Premiership Grand Final

Sunday, 14 September
3:10pm

Lismore Marist Brothers Rams	v	Murwillumbah Mustangs

Crozier Field, Lismore

== Papua New Guinea ==
=== Papua New Guinea National Rugby League ===
The Papua New Guinea National Rugby League (named the Digicel ExxonMobil Cup for sponsorship reasons) is a top tier men's Rugby League competition in Papua New Guinea. It is the top semi-professional competition in the Papua New Guinea. Despite being administered by the Papua New Guinea Rugby Football League, the competition feeds into the Port Moresby based Papua New Guinea Hunters.

==== Teams ====
The competition will feature the same 12 teams as 2024.

Colours	Club	QLD Cup Affiliate	Home ground(s)	Head coach
	Central Dabaris	Papua New Guinea Hunters	Santos National Football Stadium	TBA
	Enga Mioks	Papua New Guinea Hunters	Aipus Oval	TBA
	Goroka Lahanis	Papua New Guinea Hunters	PNG National Sports Institute	TBA
	Gulf Isou	Papua New Guinea Hunters	Santos National Football Stadium	TBA
	Hela Wigmen	Papua New Guinea Hunters	Santos National Football Stadium	TBA
	Kimbe Cutters	Papua New Guinea Hunters	Humphreys Oval	TBA
	Lae Tigers	Papua New Guinea Hunters	Lae League Ground	TBA
	Mendi Muruks	Papua New Guinea Hunters	Lae League Ground	TBA
	Mount Hagen Eagles	Papua New Guinea Hunters	John Ambane Oval	TBA
	Port Moresby Vipers	Papua New Guinea Hunters	Santos National Football Stadium	TBA
	Rabaul Gurias	Papua New Guinea Hunters	Queen Elizabeth Park	TBA
	Waghi Tumbe	Papua New Guinea Hunters	John Ambane Oval	TBA

Country Map	Port Moresby Map
Home Venues	Home Venues

==== Ladder ====
Pos	Team	Pld	W	D	L	B	PF	PA	PD	Pts	Qualification
1	Mendi Muruks	18	13	4	1	0	408	268	+140	30	Minor Premiers & Major Semi-Final
2	Lae Tigers	18	12	1	5	0	410	282	+128	25	Major Semi-Final
3	Goroka Lahanis	18	10	3	5	0	383	296	+87	23	Elimination Finals
4	Port Moresby Vipers	18	11	1	6	0	282	246	+36	23	Elimination Finals
5	Hela Wigmen	18	10	1	7	0	369	314	+55	21	Elimination Finals
6	Rabaul Gurias	18	10	0	8	0	392	340	+52	20	Elimination Finals
7	Mount Hagen Eagles	18	8	1	9	0	284	324	–40	17	
8	Waghi Tumbe	18	6	3	9	0	296	322	–26	15	
9	Gulf Isou	18	6	1	11	0	326	414	–88	13	
10	Central Dabaris	18	5	2	11	0	354	386	–32	12	
11	Enga Mioks	18	4	3	11	0	244	348	-104	11	
12	Kimbe Cutters	18	3	0	15	0	268	476	-208	6	

Updated to match(es) played on 1 September. Source:
Rules for classification: 1) points; 2) point difference; 3) points scored

===== Ladder progression =====
- Numbers highlighted in green indicate that the team finished the round inside the top 6.
- Numbers highlighted in blue indicates the team finished first on the ladder in that round.
- Numbers highlighted in red indicates the team finished last place on the ladder in that round.
- Underlined numbers indicate that the team had a bye during that round.

Pos	Team	1	2	3	4	5	6	7	8	9	10	11	12	13	14	15	16	17	18
1	Mendi Muruks	2	3	5	7	9	11	13	15	15	16	18	20	21	23	25	27	29	30
2	Lae Tigers	2	4	6	7	9	9	11	13	13	15	17	17	19	21	21	23	23	25
3	Goroka Lahanis	0	1	3	4	4	6	6	8	10	10	12	14	15	15	17	19	21	23
4	Port Moresby Vipers	2	4	5	7	9	9	11	11	13	13	13	15	15	15	17	19	21	23
5	Hela Wigmen	2	4	6	6	8	10	10	10	10	12	12	12	14	15	17	17	19	21
6	Rabaul Gurias	0	2	2	4	4	6	8	8	10	10	12	14	16	18	20	20	20	20
7	Mount Hagen Eagles	0	2	2	3	3	3	3	5	7	9	9	11	11	13	15	15	17	17
8	Waghi Tumbe	2	2	2	2	4	6	6	8	8	9	11	11	11	12	12	14	14	15
9	Gulf Isou	2	2	2	2	2	4	6	7	9	9	11	11	13	13	13	13	13	13
10	Central Dabaris	0	0	2	3	5	5	5	5	5	6	6	6	6	6	6	8	10	12
11	Enga Mioks	0	0	1	3	3	3	3	4	6	7	7	7	9	11	11	11	11	11
12	Kimbe Cutters	0	0	0	0	0	0	2	2	2	4	4	6	6	6	6	6	6	6

Season Results:

Home	Score	Away	Match Information
Home	Score	Away	Date and Time	Venue	Referee	Video
Round 1
Kimbe Cutters	10 – 24	Gulf Isou	Saturday, 12 April, 2:00pm	Humphreys Oval	TBA
Waghi Tumbe	8 – 6	Goroka Lahanis	Saturday, 12 April, 2:00pm	John Ambane Oval	TBA
Hela Wigmen	24 – 4	Mount Hagen Eagles	Sunday, 13 April, 2:00pm	Santos National Football Stadium	TBA
Mendi Muruks	32 – 8	Enga Mioks	Sunday, 13 April, 2:00pm	Lae League Ground	TBA
Lae Tigers	26 – 10	Rabaul Gurias	Sunday, 13 April, 4:00pm	Lae League Ground	TBA
Port Moresby Vipers	14 – 12	Central Dabaris	Sunday, 13 April, 4:00pm	Santos National Football Stadium	TBA
Round 2
Rabaul Gurias	34 – 6	Kimbe Cutters	Saturday, 19 April, 2:00pm	Queen Elizabeth Park	TBA
Waghi Tumbe	16 – 36	Lae Tigers	Saturday, 19 April, 2:00pm	John Ambane Oval	TBA
Mount Hagen Eagles	14 – 8	Enga Mioks	Saturday, 19 April, 4:00pm	John Ambane Oval	TBA
Goroka Lahanis	10 – 10	Rabaul Gurias	Sunday, 20 April, 2:00pm	PNG National Sports Institute	TBA
Gulf Isou	14 – 18	Port Moresby Vipers	Sunday, 20 April, 2:00pm	Santos National Football Stadium	TBA
Central Dabaris	26 – 30	Hela Wigmen	Sunday, 20 April, 4:00pm	Santos National Football Stadium	TBA
Round 3 (ANZAC Round)
Enga Mioks	4 – 4	Port Moresby Vipers	Sunday, 27 April, 2:00pm	Aipus Oval	TBA
Central Dabaris	30 – 20	Rabaul Gurias	Sunday, 27 April, 2:00pm	Santos National Football Stadium	TBA
Goroka Lahanis	28 – 22	Mount Hagen Eagles	Sunday, 27 April, 2:00pm	PNG National Sports Institute	TBA
Lae Tigers	36 – 0	Kimbe Cutters	Sunday, 27 April, 2:00pm	Lae League Ground	TBA
Mendi Muruks	32 – 8	Gulf Isou	Sunday, 27 April, 4:00pm	Lae League Ground	TBA
Hela Wigmen	34 – 16	Waghi Tumbe	Sunday, 27 April, 4:00pm	Santos National Football Stadium	TBA
Round 4
Kimbe Cutters	14 – 36	Mendi Muruks	Saturday, 3 May, 2:00pm	Humphreys Oval	TBA
Mount Hagen Eagles	22 – 22	Central Dabaris	Saturday, 3 May, 4:00pm	Humphreys Oval	TBA
Enga Mioks	26 – 18	Hela Wigmen	Sunday, 4 May, 2:00pm	Aipus Oval	TBA
Lae Tigers	20 – 20	Goroka Lahanis	Sunday, 4 May, 2:00pm	Lae League Ground	TBA
Gulf Isou	16 – 18	Rabaul Gurias	Sunday, 4 May, 2:00pm	Santos National Football Stadium	TBA
Port Moresby Vipers	20 – 12	Waghi Tumbe	Sunday, 4 May, 4:00pm	Santos National Football Stadium	TBA
Round 5
Rabaul Gurias	20 – 24	Mendi Muruks	Saturday, 10 May, 2:00pm	Queen Elizabeth Park	TBA
Waghi Tumbe	12 – 8	Gulf Isou	Saturday, 10 May, 2:00pm	John Ambane Oval	TBA
Mount Hagen Eagles	14 – 34	Lae Tigers	Saturday, 10 May, 4:00pm	John Ambane Oval	TBA
Central Dabaris	18 – 14	Enga Mioks	Sunday, 11 May, 12:00pm	Santos National Football Stadium	TBA
Port Moresby Vipers	20 – 16	Kimbe Cutters	Sunday, 11 May, 2:00pm	Santos National Football Stadium	TBA
Hela Wigmen	26 – 21	Goroka Lahanis	Sunday, 11 May, 4:00pm	Santos National Football Stadium	TBA
Round 6
Kimbe Cutters	16 – 20	Hela Wigmen	Saturday, 17 May, 2:00pm	Humphreys Oval	TBA
Rabaul Gurias	26 – 24	Port Moresby Vipers	Saturday, 17 May, 2:00pm	Queen Elizabeth Park	TBA
Waghi Tumbe	30 – 0	Mount Hagen Eagles	Saturday, 17 May, 2:00pm	John Ambane Oval	TBA
Central Dabaris	14 – 26	Gulf Isou	Sunday, 18 May, 2:00pm	Santos National Football Stadium	TBA
Goroka Lahanis	20 – 10	Enga Mioks	Sunday, 18 May, 2:00pm	PNG National Sports Institute	TBA
Mendi Muruks	28 – 20	Lae Tigers	Sunday, 18 May, 2:00pm	Lae League Ground	TBA
Round 7
Kimbe Cutters	16 – 10	Central Dabaris	Saturday, 24 May, 2:00pm	Humphreys Oval	TBA
Mount Hagen Eagles	12 – 20	Port Moresby Vipers	Saturday, 24 May, 2:00pm	John Ambane Oval	TBA
Gulf Isou	28 – 24	Goroka Lahanis	Sunday, 25 May, 2:00pm	Santos National Football Stadium	TBA
Mendi Muruks	18 – 16	Waghi Tumbe	Sunday, 25 May, 2:00pm	Lae League Ground	TBA
Lae Tigers	20 – 4	Enga Mioks	Sunday, 25 May, 4:00pm	Lae League Ground	TBA
Hela Wigmen	8 – 10	Rabaul Gurias	Sunday, 25 May, 4:00pm	Santos National Football Stadium	TBA
Round 8
Kimbe Cutters	12 – 18	Mount Hagen Eagles	Saturday, 31 May, 2:00pm	Humphreys Oval	TBA
Hela Wigmen	18 – 24	Lae Tigers	Sunday, 1 June, 12:00pm	Santos National Football Stadium	TBA
Enga Mioks	20 – 20	Gulf Isou	Sunday, 1 June, 2:00pm	Aipus Oval	TBA
Goroka Lahanis	26 – 12	Rabaul Gurias	Sunday, 1 June, 2:00pm	PNG National Sports Institute	TBA
Central Dabaris	10 – 30	Waghi Tumbe	Sunday, 1 June, 2:00pm	Santos National Football Stadium	TBA
Port Moresby Vipers	8 – 14	Mendi Muruks	Sunday, 1 June, 4:00pm	Santos National Football Stadium	TBA
Round 9
Rabaul Gurias	16 – 4	Waghi Tumbe	Saturday, 7 June, 2:00pm	Queen Elizabeth Park	TBA
Mount Hagen Eagles	18 – 12	Mendi Muruks	Saturday, 7 June, 2:00pm	John Ambane Oval	TBA
Gulf Isou	12 – 10	Lae Tigers	Sunday, 8 June, 12:00pm	Santos National Football Stadium	TBA
Enga Mioks	20 – 18	Kimbe Cutters	Sunday, 8 June, 2:00pm	Aipus Oval	TBA
Central Dabaris	16 – 22	Goroka Lahanis	Sunday, 8 June, 2:00pm	Santos National Football Stadium	TBA
Port Moresby Vipers	14 – 8	Hela Wigmen	Sunday, 8 June, 4:00pm	Santos National Football Stadium	TBA
Round 10
Kimbe Cutters	26 – 12	Goroka Lahanis	Saturday, 14 June, 2:00pm	Humphreys Oval	TBA
Hela Wigmen	15 – 14	Gulf Isou	Saturday, 14 June, 2:00pm	Santos National Football Stadium	TBA
Waghi Tumbe	12 – 12	Enga Mioks	Saturday, 14 June, 2:00pm	John Ambane Oval	TBA
Mount Hagen Eagles	28 – 22	Rabaul Gurias	Saturday, 14 June, 4:00pm	John Ambane Oval	TBA
Mendi Muruks	22 – 22	Central Dabaris	Sunday, 15 June, 2:00pm	Lae League Ground	TBA
Lae Tigers	28 – 18	Port Moresby Vipers	Sunday, 15 June, 4:00pm	Lae League Ground	TBA
Round 11 (Amazing Round)
Waghi Tumbe	26 – 16	Kimbe Cutters	Saturday, 21 June, 12:00pm	Santos National Football Stadium	TBA
Gulf Isou	20 – 16	Mount Hagen Eagles	Saturday, 21 June, 2:00pm	Santos National Football Stadium	TBA
Rabaul Gurias	24 – 16	Enga Mioks	Saturday, 21 June, 4:00pm	Santos National Football Stadium	TBA
Goroka Lahanis	18 – 4	Port Moresby Vipers	Sunday, 22 June, 12:00pm	Santos National Football Stadium	TBA
Lae Tigers	30 – 14	Central Dabaris	Sunday, 22 June, 2:00pm	Santos National Football Stadium	TBA
Mendi Muruks	15 – 14	Hela Wigmen	Sunday, 22 June, 4:00pm	Santos National Football Stadium	TBA
Round 12
Rabaul Gurias	32 – 10	Lae Tigers	Saturday, 5 July, 2:00pm	Queen Elizabeth Park	TBA
Mount Hagen Eagles	30 – 14	Hela Wigmen	Saturday, 5 July, 2:00pm	John Ambane Oval	TBA
Goroka Lahanis	22 – 20	Waghi Tumbe	Sunday, 6 July, 2:00pm	PNG National Sports Institute	TBA
Enga Mioks	22 – 26	Mendi Muruks	Sunday, 6 July, 2:00pm	Aipus Oval	TBA
Central Dabaris	4 – 26	Port Moresby Vipers	Sunday, 6 July, 2:00pm	Santos National Football Stadium	TBA
Gulf Isou	18 – 30	Kimbe Cutters	Sunday, 6 July, 4:00pm	Santos National Football Stadium	TBA
Round 13
Kimbe Cutters	22 – 28	Rabaul Gurias	Saturday, 12 July, 2:00pm	Humphreys Oval	TBA
Enga Mioks	12 – 8	Mount Hagen Eagles	Sunday, 13 July, 2:00pm	Aipus Oval	TBA
Port Moresby Vipers	18 – 30	Gulf Isou	Sunday, 13 July, 2:00pm	Santos National Football Stadium	TBA
Lae Tigers	22 – 6	Waghi Tumbe	Sunday, 13 July, 2:00pm	Lae League Ground	TBA
Mendi Muruks	18 – 18	Goroka Lahanis	Sunday, 13 July, 4:00pm	Lae League Ground	TBA
Hela Wigmen	18 – 10	Central Dabaris	Sunday, 13 July, 4:00pm	Santos National Football Stadium	TBA
Round 14
Kimbe Cutters	14 – 20	Lae Tigers	Saturday, 19 July, 2:00pm	Humphreys Oval	TBA
Rabaul Gurias	36 – 16	Central Dabaris	Saturday, 19 July, 2:00pm	Queen Elizabeth Park	TBA
Waghi Tumbe	28 – 28	Hela Wigmen	Saturday, 19 July, 2:00pm	John Ambane Oval	TBA
Mount Hagen Eagles	18 – 14	Goroka Lahanis	Saturday, 19 July, 4:00pm	John Ambane Oval	TBA
Gulf Isou	14 – 19	Mendi Muruks	Sunday, 20 July, 2:00pm	Santos National Football Stadium	TBA
Port Moresby Vipers	10 – 14	Enga Mioks	Sunday, 20 July, 4:00pm	Santos National Football Stadium	TBA
Round 15
Waghi Tumbe	4 – 14	Port Moresby Vipers	Saturday, 26 July, 2:00pm	John Ambane Oval	TBA
Rabaul Gurias	42 – 20	Gulf Isou	Saturday, 26 July, 2:00pm	Queen Elizabeth Park	TBA
Mendi Muruks	44 – 14	Kimbe Cutters	Sunday, 27 July, 2:00pm	Lae League Ground	TBA
Goroka Lahanis	26 – 16	Lae Tigers	Sunday, 27 July, 2:00pm	PNG National Sports Institute	TBA
Hela Wigmen	14 – 12	Enga Mioks	Sunday, 27 July, 2:00pm	Santos National Football Stadium	TBA
Central Dabaris	10 – 18	Mount Hagen Eagles	Sunday, 27 July, 4:00pm	Santos National Football Stadium	TBA
Round 16
Kimbe Cutters	14 – 26	Port Moresby Vipers	Saturday, 2 August, 2:00pm	Humphreys Oval	TBA
Enga Mioks	10 – 40	Central Dabaris	Sunday, 3 August, 2:00pm	Santos National Football Stadium	TBA
Gulf Isou	18 – 28	Waghi Tumbe	Sunday, 3 August, 4:00pm	Santos National Football Stadium	TBA
Goroka Lahanis	22 – 14	Hela Wigmen	Sunday, 3 August, 2:00pm	PNG National Sports Institute	TBA
Mendi Muruks	30 – 20	Rabaul Gurias	Sunday, 3 August, 2:00pm	Lae League Ground	TBA
Lae Tigers	26 – 18	Mount Hagen Eagles	Sunday, 3 August, 4:00pm	Lae League Ground	TBA
Round 17
Mount Hagen Eagles	14 – 0	Waghi Tumbe	Saturday, 9 August, 2:00pm	John Ambane Oval	TBA
Gulf Isou	18 – 36	Central Dabaris	Sunday, 10 August, 12:00pm	Santos National Football Stadium	TBA
Enga Mioks	10 – 22	Goroka Lahanis	Sunday, 10 August, 2:00pm	Aipus Oval	TBA
Mendi Muruks	10 – 4	Lae Tigers	Sunday, 10 August, 2:00pm	Lae League Ground	TBA
Hela Wigmen	40 – 10	Kimbe Cutters	Sunday, 10 August, 2:00pm	Santos National Football Stadium	TBA
Port Moresby Vipers	8 – 6	Rabaul Gurias	Sunday, 10 August, 4:00pm	Santos National Football Stadium	TBA
Round 18
Waghi Tumbe	18 – 18	Mendi Muruks	Saturday, 16 August, 2:00pm	John Ambane Oval	TBA
Rabaul Gurias	16 – 26	Hela Wigmen	Saturday, 16 August, 2:00pm	Queen Elizabeth Park	TBA
Goroka Lahanis	52 – 18	Gulf Isou	Sunday, 17 August, 2:00pm	PNG National Sports Institute	TBA
Enga Mioks	22 – 28	Lae Tigers	Sunday, 17 August, 2:00pm	Aipus Oval	TBA
Central Dabaris	42 – 12	Kimbe Cutters	Sunday, 17 August, 2:00pm	Santos National Football Stadium	TBA
Port Moresby Vipers	16 – 10	Mount Hagen Eagles	Sunday, 17 August, 4:00pm	Santos National Football Stadium	TBA
Finals Series
Qualifying Finals
Goroka Lahanis	17 – 24	Rabaul Gurias	Sunday, 24 August, 1:00pm	Santos National Football Stadium	TBA
Port Moresby Vipers	18 – 12	Hela Wigmen	Sunday, 24 August, 3:00pm	Santos National Football Stadium	TBA
Major & Minor Semi-Finals
Port Moresby Vipers	9 – 14	Rabaul Gurias	Sunday, 31 August, 2:00pm	Santos National Football Stadium	TBA
Mendi Muruks	16 – 24	Lae Tigers	Sunday, 31 August, 4:00pm	Santos National Football Stadium	TBA
Preliminary Final
Mendi Muruks	20 – 12	Rabaul Gurias	Sunday, 7 September, 2:00pm	Santos National Football Stadium	TBA
Grand Final
Lae Tigers	V	Mendi Muruks	Sunday, 14 September, 2:00pm	Santos National Football Stadium	TBA

==== Grand Final ====
Elimination Finals
3	Goroka	17
6	Rabaul	24
4	Port Moresby	18
5	Hela	12

Semi-Finals
1	Mendi	16
2	Lae	24
4	Port Moresby	9
6	Rabaul	14

Preliminary Final
1	Mendi	20
6	Rabaul	12

Grand Final
2	Lae
1	Mendi

2025 Papua New Guinea National Rugby League Grand Final

14 September 2025
2:00pm

Lae Tigers	v	Mendi Muruks

Santos National Football Stadium, Port Moresby

== See also ==
- 2025 QRL Major Competitions
- 2025 NSWRL Major Competitions
- 2025 NSWRL Feeder Competitions
