= Deaths in April 1978 =

The following is a list of notable deaths in April 1978. Entries for each day are listed alphabetically by surname. A typical entry lists information in the following sequence:

- Name, age, country of citizenship at birth, subsequent country of citizenship (if applicable), reason for notability, cause of death (if known), and reference.

== April 1978 ==
=== 1 ===
- İsmail Hakkı Baltacıoğlu, 92, Turkish journalist and academic administrator.
- Laurence Bradshaw, 79, English sculptor and political activist.
- Lionel Fox, 65, New Zealand runner.
- Linda Goldstone, 29, American childbirth instructor, shot.
- Emmett Grogan, 35, American activist and writer, heart attack.
- Olaf Nygaard, 83, Norwegian Olympic cyclist (1920).
- Lynne Roberts, 55, American actress, fall.
- Agide Simonazzi, 82, Italian Olympic sprinter (1920).
- Adderley Wilkinson, 90, Irish cricketer.

=== 2 ===
- Aurelio Baldor, 71, Cuban mathematician, emphysema.
- Bill Brubaker, 67, American baseball player.
- Gloria Dawn, 49, Australian actress, cancer.
- Amy Goldin, 52, American art critic, cancer.
- Jack Hubbard, 92, American football player and coach.
- Willi Kaidel, 65, German Olympic rower (1936).
- Wilmore B. Leonard, 61, American educator, member of the Tuskegee Airmen, cancer.
- Thomas Trembath, 66, Australian cricketer.

=== 3 ===
- Karl Asplund, 87, Swedish writer.
- Gustavo Cuervo Rubio, 87, Cuban politician, vice president (1940–1944), pneumonia.
- Ray French, 83, American baseball player.
- Nina S. Gore, 74, American socialite and actress, cancer.
- Franz Heep, 75, German-Brazilian architect.
- George Edwin Hills, 72, English-Canadian politician.
- Ken Hirano, 67, Japanese literary critic, stroke.
- H. N. Kunzru, 90, Indian politician, MP (1952–1964).
- Ernst Leche, 80, Swedish judge.
- Kevin McAlinden, 64, Northern Irish footballer.
- Mary McCarthy, 75, Australian police officer.
- Tom McKay, 77, Canadian Olympic runner (1924).
- René Morel, 66, French Olympic runner (1932).
- Ray Noble, 74, English bandleader and composer ("The Very Thought of You"), cancer.
- Winston Sharples, 69, American film composer.
- John H. Sides, 73, American naval admiral, cardiac arrest.

=== 4 ===
- F. Joseph Donohue, 78, American politician, heart attack.
- Semyon Kirlian, 80, Soviet photographer, inventor of Kirlian photography.
- Tony Leighton, 38, English footballer, amyotrophic lateral sclerosis.
- Elias MacDonald, 79, English footballer.
- Sir Morien Morgan, 65, Welsh aeronautical engineer.
- Stanley C. Norton, 83, American naval admiral.
- Esperanza Osmeña, 83, Filipino socialite, first lady (1944–1946), heart failure.

=== 5 ===
- Harry Douglass, 76, British trade unionist.
- Walter Dudley, 60, Australian cricketer and footballer.
- Irene Dillard Elliott, 85, American academic administrator.
- Douglas Henderson, 59, American actor, suicide by carbon monoxide poisoning.
- Walter Huppenkothen, 70, German lawyer.
- Albert Lewis, 94, Polish-born American stage and film producer.
- Joseph McGoldrick, 76, American politician, cancer.
- Edna Rankin McKinnon, 84, American social activist.
- Harry Rockafeller, 83, American football player and coach.
- Carlo Tagliabue, 80, Italian singer.

=== 6 ===
- Zsolt Baranyai, 29, Hungarian mathematician, traffic collision.
- Lin Bend, 55, Canadian ice hockey player.
- Bobbie Bruce, 72, Scottish footballer.
- Nicolas Nabokov, 74, Russian-American composer, heart attack.
- Martin Secker, 96, British publisher.
- Ernest L. Wilkinson, 78, American academic administrator and lawyer, heart attack.

=== 7 ===
- Malcolm Ashworth, 52, English intelligence officer and marketing executive, stroke.
- Enos Bromage, 79, English footballer.
- Bill Coontz, 60, American actor and stuntman, cancer.
- Richard Dandridge, 86, American baseball player.
- Sir Maurice Dean, 71, English civil servant.
- Robert Aaron Gordon, 69, American economist, heart attack.
- Donald Gray, 64, South African actor (The Vise, Captain Scarlet and the Mysterons), coronary artery disease.
- Alexander G. B. Grosvenor, 50, American naval officer and yachtsman, brain cancer.
- Ernest Kanitz, 83, Austrian-American composer.
- Kojin Kozu, 88, Japanese painter.
- Harry Purdy, 80, Australian footballer.
- Albert Tangora, 74, American competitive typist, heart attack.

=== 8 ===
- Preston M. Burch, 93, American racehorse trainer and breeder.
- Ford Frick, 83, American baseball executive and sportswriter, MLB commissioner (1951–1965).
- Lon L. Fuller, 75, American legal philosopher.
- Johan Holberg, 85, Estonian politician.
- Peter Igelhoff, 73, Austrian pianist and composer.
- Gaston Leval, 82, French historian and trade unionist.
- Clemente Marroquín, 80, Guatemalan politician, vice president (1966–1970).
- Dick Risenhoover, 51, American sportscaster, liver cancer.
- Kurt Voß, 77, German footballer.

=== 9 ===
- Edythe Elliott, 91, American actress.
- Christopher Hollis Johnson, 74, British chemist and physicist.
- Reinhold Mannkopff, 83, German physicist.
- Vivian McGrath, 62, Australian tennis player, heart disease.
- Orville Pottenger, 56, American football player and coach, cancer.
- Bruce V. Reagan, 75, American politician, member of the California State Assembly (1949–1951, 1959–1963).
- Allan Sproul, 82, American banker, heart attack.
- Sir Clough Williams-Ellis, 94, Welsh architect and urban planner.
- Michael Wilson, 63, American screenwriter (The Bridge on the River Kwai, Lawrence of Arabia, Planet of the Apes), heart attack.

=== 10 ===
- Anthony Jochim, 86, American actor.
- Irma Lindheim, 91, American educator and Zionist activist.
- Hjalmar Mäe, 76, Estonian politician and Nazi collaborator.
- Leo Michelson, 90, Latvian-American artist.
- Long John Nebel, 66, American radio broadcaster, prostate cancer.
- Amanda E. Peele, 75, American biologist.
- William Pritchard, 76, American football player and coach.
- Sydney Robinson, 72, British trade unionist.
- John David Rogers, 82, Australian soldier and oil executive, stroke.
- Eyvin Schiøttz, 67, Danish sailor.
- Endre Sík, 87, Hungarian politician and historian.
- Robert Vas, 47, Hungarian-English film director.
- Albert Vollrat, 74, Estonian wrestler and football manager.

=== 11 ===
- Jimmy Argue, 66, Scottish footballer.
- George C. Cory Jr., 57, American pianist and composer ("I Left My Heart in San Francisco"), drug overdose.
- Rollo Graham Campbell, 75, British Anglican prelate.
- Antonia Herrero, 80, Spanish-born Argentine actress.
- Yeffe Kimball, 72, American painter, cancer.
- Ian MacDonald, 63, American actor (High Noon), cardiac arrest.
- Fred McCollum, 66, American football player and coach.
- Chris Mensalvas, 68, Filipino-American trade unionist, house fire.
- Claire Raphael Reis, 89, American musical promoter.
- Jock Thompson, 73, South African cricketer.

=== 12 ===
- Sir Alan Carmody, 57, Australian public servant, coronary artery disease.
- Sir Samuel Cooke, 66, British barrister and judge.
- Carole Garnett-Wheeler, 79, American Olympic swimmer (1924).
- Tiberiu Iliescu, 71, Romanian writer and poet.
- Tobias Jehle, 92, Liechtensteiner politician.
- Luther Johnson, 74, American racing driver.
- Pavel Terentyevich Korobkov, 68, Soviet general and flying ace.
- Leon Johnson Ladner, 93, Canadian politician, MP (1921–1930).
- Walter Langston, 93, American football player and coach.
- Charles Maclay, 64, Scottish anatomist.
- Hermann Rentzsch, 64, German general.
- Don Webster, 53, Canadian ice hockey player.
- Wee Kheng Chiang, 87, Malaysian banking executive.

=== 13 ===
- Kalikananda Abadhut, 67, Indian novelist.
- Louella Ballerino, 77, American fashion designer.
- Ernst Bantle, 77, German footballer.
- Jack Chambers, 47, Canadian artist and filmmaker (The Hart of London), leukemia.
- Suresh Goel, 34, Indian badminton player, heart failure.
- Georges Guillon, 78, French Olympic runner (1920).
- Bill Hazlett, 72, New Zealand rugby player and racehorse trainer.
- Wojciech Łukaszewski, 42, Polish composer.
- Owen Finlay Maclaren, 71, English businessman.
- Paul McGrath, 74, American actor, heart attack.
- Funmilayo Ransome-Kuti, 77, Nigerian educator and feminist activist, complications from blunt force trauma.
- William Rees-Thomas, 90, Welsh psychiatrist.
- Hedwig Rieder, 58, Swiss Olympic fencer (1948, 1952).
- Violetta Thurstan, 99, English nurse and author.
- Rosemary Woolf, 52, English literary scholar.

=== 14 ===
- Asadollah Alam, 58, Iranian politician, prime minister (1962–1964), cancer.
- Olive Beamish, 87, Irish-born English suffragist and trade unionist.
- André Cramois, 77, French banker and engineer.
- David Davis IV, 71, American lawyer and politician, member of the Illinois Senate (1953–1967).
- Sophia Lyon Fahs, 101, American writer and religious activist.
- Bill Glynn, 77, Australian footballer.
- Joe Gordon, 63, American baseball player, coach and manager, cardiac arrest.
- Thomas Hollingdale, 77, Welsh rugby player.
- F. R. Leavis, 82, English literary critic.
- Bill Leinhauser, 84, American baseball player.
- Dante Panzeri, 56, Argentine sports journalist.
- Ernest Parkinson, 83, English cricketer.
- Arline Pretty, 92, American actress.
- Jonas Puzinas, 72, Lithuanian archaeologist.
- Lewis Teague, 60, American painter.

=== 15 ===
- Đorđe Detlinger, 65, Yugoslav football player and manager.
- Marion Moncure Duncan, 64, American civic leader and businesswoman, cancer.
- McKinley Kirk, 81, American harness racing driver.
- Olan Mills Sr., 73, American photographer and businessman, fall.
- Anthony John King Mussio, 75, American Roman Catholic prelate, heart attack.
- Marcel-Edmond Naegelen, 86, French politician.
- Ravindra Rupasena, 49, Sri Lankan actor, heart attack.
- Joseph Sunlight, 89, Russian-born English architect.
- Frank Tallman, 58, American stunt pilot, plane crash.

=== 16 ===
- Eddie Brown, 66, English cricketer.
- Francis X. Bushman Jr., 74, American actor.
- Thomas Cahill, 65, Australian Roman Catholic prelate, heart attack.
- Lucius D. Clay, 79, American general, emphysema.
- Paul Cootner, 47, American economist, heart attack.
- Joseph Delteil, 83, French writer and poet.
- Gerald Dunning, 72, British archaeologist.
- Jack Gentry, 78, English cricketer.
- Abdul Hamid Jumat, 61, Malaysian politician and diplomat.
- Nagamichi Kuroda, 88, Japanese ornithologist.
- Richard Lindner, 76, German-American painter.
- Eddie Morgan, 64, Welsh rugby player.
- Marie Ahnighito Peary, 84, American writer and philanthropist.
- John Sines, 63, American basketball player and coach.
- Philibert Tsiranana, 65, Malagasy politician, prime minister (1958–1959) and president (1959–1972).
- Barbara Vernon, 61, Australian playwright and screenwriter, cardiomyopathy.
- Elizabeth Rebecca Ward, 97, English writer.
- Edward Whitehead, 69, British advertising executive.

=== 17 ===
- Surrey S. Alleman, 76, New Zealand architect
- Ewald Balser, 79, German actor.
- Clyde Beattie, 72, Australian footballer.
- Frederick van Pelt Bryan, 73, American judge, heart attack.
- Charlie Chapman, 73, Australian footballer.
- Lar Daly, 66, American politician and novelty candidate, lung disease.
- Antoine Fréchette, 72, Canadian politician, MP (1958–1962).
- John B. Heffernan, 83, American naval admiral and historian, complications from brain surgery.
- Mir Akbar Khyber, 53, Afghan politician, shot.
- Floreal Ruiz, 62, Argentine tango singer and composer.
- Vern Wright, 77, Australian footballer.

=== 18 ===
- Dodo Antadze, 77, Soviet Georgian theatre director.
- Rudolf Bonnet, 83, Dutch artist.
- Alex Brinchmann, 89, Norwegian pediatrician and novelist.
- Karl Holtz, 79, German cartoonist.
- Katherine Schmidt, 79, American artist, cancer.
- Dudley Seddon, 75, Australian cricketer and rugby player.
- Sir Sobha Singh, 90, Indian architect and urban planner.

=== 19 ===
- David Dickson, 77, New Zealand rugby player.
- Joe Dougherty, 79, American actor and voice actor (Porky Pig), heart attack.
- Elsa Gidoni, 77, German-American architect and interior designer.
- William Griesinger, 82, Canadian politician.
- David Kerr, 77, Canadian politician.
- John Koch, 68, American painter, stroke.
- Dave Komonen, 79, Finnish marathon runner.
- Nils Lie, 75, Norwegian writer and translator.
- J. Francis McComas, 66, American science fiction author.
- Sir Arnold Plant, 79, British economist.
- Bernard Sutton, 86, British Olympic speed skater (1924).
- Jack Titus, 70, Australian footballer.
- Paddy Troy, 70, Australian trade unionist.

=== 20 ===
- Jean Babelon, 89, French historian.
- Marie Babka, 92, American politician, member of the Ohio House of Representatives (1948–1950).
- Lloyd C. Bird, 83, American politician, member of the Virginia Senate (1944–1972).
- Frédéric Bourguet, 89, French politician.
- Lord Richard Cecil, 30, British journalist, shot.
- Kevin Curran, 57, Australian footballer.
- Jack Graney, 91, Canadian-American baseball player.
- Károly Kővári, 65, Hungarian Olympic skier (1936, 1948).
- Moses Kunitz, 90, Russian-American biochemist.
- Lo Hsiang-lin, 71, Chinese historian and linguist.
- Ferdinand Peroutka, 83, Czech journalist and writer.
- Challen Skeet, 82, English cricketer.
- Alexander Skibnevsky, 75, Soviet theatre director.
- Orville Tuttle, 65, American football player and coach.
- Clara Louise Zinke, 69, American tennis player.

=== 21 ===
- Thelma Boardman, 68, American voice actress (Minnie Mouse, Bambi).
- Jesse Roy Christie, 88, American nematologist and plant pathologist.
- Sandy Denny, 31, English musician (Fairport Convention), complications from a fall.
- Walter K. Granger, 89, American politician, member of the U.S. House of Representatives (1941–1953).
- Billy Kirsopp, 86, English footballer.
- T. R. Mahalingam, 53, Indian actor and singer.
- Willard Midgette, 40, American painter, brain cancer.
- Guillermo Peschard, 75, Mexican dentist and educator.
- Mario Scocco, 78, Italian politician and humanitarian.
- Thomas Wyatt Turner, 101, American botanist and civil rights activist.
- U Raschid, 65, Pakistani-Burmese politician, prostate cancer.

=== 22 ===
- Barry Assheton-Smith, 73, South African cricketer.
- Nicolae Caranfil, 84, Romanian Olympic fencer (1928).
- Lota Cheek, 79, American actress and model.
- Basil Dean, 89, English actor and filmmaker.
- Helen Dingman, 93, American academic and social worker.
- Will Geer, 76, American actor (The Waltons), musician and activist, respiratory failure.
- Primrose Harley, 70, British painter.
- Jo Heims, 48, American screenwriter (Dirty Harry, Play Misty for Me), breast cancer.
- Franz Loskarn, 87, German actor.
- Varvara Myasnikova, 77, Soviet actress.
- Axel Nilsson, 73, Swedish ice hockey player and footballer.
- Helmy Rafla, 68, Egyptian filmmaker.
- Reefton Spicer, 79, Australian footballer.

=== 23 ===
- Frank DelRoy, 65, American racing official and mechanic, plane crash.
- Soegondo Djojopoespito, 73, Indonesian politician, lung cancer.
- James Whitney Fosburgh, 67, American painter and art historian, cancer.
- Paul Lerme, 76, French racing cyclist.
- Des Mannion, 38, Australian rugby player.
- Frank C. Moore, 82, Canadian-born American politician, lieutenant governor of New York (1951–1953), cancer.
- Ivan Pereverzev, 63, Soviet actor.
- Bull Polisky, 77, American football player.
- Doug Rayment, 67, Australian footballer.
- Jacques Rueff, 81, French economist and diplomat.
- Teo Soon Kim, 73, Singaporean-Hong Kong barrister.
- Anna Fellowes Vroland, 75, Australian human rights activist.

=== 24 ===
- C. B. Akers, 89, American politician.
- Hunk Anderson, 79, American football player and coach, respiratory disease.
- Joe Begala, 72, American football and wrestling coach.
- John Carvell, 83, British diplomat and humanitarian.
- Federico Chaves, 96, Paraguayan politician, president (1949–1954).
- Ilona Duczyńska, 81, Hungarian-Canadian activist and journalist.
- Viktor Gehring, 89, German actor.
- Jack Keane, 86, Irish hurler.
- Ivan A. Nestingen, 56, American politician, member of the Wisconsin State Assembly (1955–1956), heart failure.
- Harold Ogust, 61, American bridge player.
- Engelbert Pigal, 78-79, Austrian engineer.
- Raymond Wilt, 70, American politician, member of the Pennsylvania House of Representatives (1965–1970).
- Hidemi Yoshida, 76, Japanese naval admiral.

=== 25 ===
- Mario Castellani, 71, Italian actor.
- Harry Griffths, 47, Welsh football player and manager.
- Brian King, 40, Canadian police constable, shot.
- Eero Liives, 86, Estonian composer and violinist.
- Sir Rhys Llewellyn, 2nd Baronet, 68, Welsh mining executive and hereditary peer.
- Zenta Mauriņa, 80, Latvian essayist.
- Leo Najo, 79, Mexican-born American baseball player.
- Hannes Neuner, 71, German painter.
- Peng Shaohui, 71, Chinese general.
- Cadambathur Tiruvenkatacharlu Rajagopal, 74, Indian mathematician.
- Arne Rustadstuen, 72, Norwegian Olympic skier (1932).
- Douglas Waples, 85, American librarian.
- Ada May Weeks, 82, American actress.

=== 26 ===
- Julio Bracho, 68, Mexican filmmaker.
- József Debreczeni, 72, Hungarian writer and translator.
- Bennett Griffin, 82, American aviator, heart failure.
- Elsie Knocker, 93, British nurse, pneumonia.
- Peppino Mangravite, 81, Italian-American painter.
- Stuart Stewart, 71, Australian footballer.

=== 27 ===
- John Clyde Bowen, 89, American judge.
- Terry Carpenter, 78, American politician, member of the U.S. House of Representatives (1933–1935) and Nebraska Legislature (1953–1955, 1957–1961, 1963–1974), stomach cancer.
- John Doeg, 69, Mexican-born American tennis player.
- Forest Hopkins, 65, American politician, member of the Pennsylvania House of Representatives (since 1967).
- Mohammed Naim Khan, 66–67, Afghan politician and diplomat, shot.
- Josef Marais, 72, South African-American singer and songwriter, complications from surgery.
- Guido Stampacchia, 56, Italian mathematician, cardiac arrest.
- Alan Willcox, 76, American lawyer.

=== 28 ===
- Hermann Budzislawski, 77, German journalist.
- Elisha Avery Crary, 72, American judge, cancer.
- Pedro del Valle, 84, American general.
- Makhosini Dlamini, 63–64, Swazi politician and diplomat, prime minister (1967–1976).
- Art Doll, 64, American baseball player.
- Walter Fischer, 77, Austrian journalist, politician and doctor.
- Ben Gage, 63, American singer and actor.
- Arch Hall Sr., 69, American actor and filmmaker (Eegah), heart attack.
- Sir Ronald Ivelaw-Chapman, 79, British air marshal.
- Roman Karmen, 71, Soviet filmmaker.
- Evan Klamer, 55, Danish Olympic cyclist (1948).
- Salim L. Lewis, 69, American investment banker (Bear Stearns), stroke.
- Curt McMahon, 63, American basketball player.
- Russell Metty, 71, American cinematographer (Spartacus).
- Sir Philip Neame, 89, British general.
- Geoff Shaw, 51, Scottish Presbyterian minister and politician.
- E. C. S. Wade, 82, British legal scholar.
- Notable Afghans assassinated during the Saur Revolution:
  - Zamina Begum, 61, socialite, first lady (since 1973)
  - Mohammad Daoud Khan, 68, politician, prime minister (1953–1963) and president (since 1973)
  - Ghulam Haidar Rasuli, 57–58, politician and general

=== 29 ===
- Robert Debré, 95, French pediatrician.
- Theo Helfrich, 64, German racing driver.
- Leif Larsen, 80, Norwegian politician.
- Abdul Qadir Nuristani, 41, Afghan politician, shot.
- El Tari, 52, Indonesian politician, kidney failure.
- Wally Timm, 81, American aircraft designer and pilot.
- Michael Wardell, 82, British publisher, stroke.
- Yukihiko Yasuda, 94, Japanese painter.

=== 30 ===
- Carl Anderson, 79, American football player and coach, heart attack.
- Liane Augustin, 50, German-Austrian singer and actress.
- Bill Hoogs Jr., 37, American tennis player, cancer.
- Yuriy Lahutyn, 29, Soviet Olympic handball player (1972, 1976).
- Lauritz Johan Riise, 67, Norwegian politician.
- Pamela Underwood, 68, British florist.
