= Trembath =

Trembath is a surname of Cornish origin. Notable people with the name include:

- Bill Brunier (full name William Davies Trembath Brunier), Australian VFL footballer
- Christopher Trembath, English cricketer
- Cooper Trembath, Australian AFL footballer
- Ethan Trembath, New Zealand bass guitarist (Alien Weaponry)
- James Trembath, South African sports shooter
- Luke Trembath, Australian professional snowboarder
- Richard C. Trembath, American politician
- Thomas Trembath, Australian cricketer
- Elizabeth Trembath-Reichert, American space biologist
