= Kozu =

Kozu or Kōzu may refer to:

== Places ==
- Kōzu-shima (神津島), or Kozu Island, an island south of Tokyo Bay
- Kōzu (国府津), a place name in the eastern region of Odawara, Kanagawa
  - Kōzu Station (Kanagawa), a railway station in Odawara, Kanagawa
- Kōzu (高津), a place name in Chūō-ku, Osaka
- Kōzu Station (Osaka) (郡津駅), a train station located in Katano, Osaka Prefecture

== People with the name ==
- Kozu Akutsu (born 1960), retired long-distance runner from Japan
- Kojin Kozu (神津 港人; 1889–1978), Japanese painter
- Masaaki Kozu (born 1974), Japanese cross-country skier who has competed since 1993

== Fictional characters ==
- Kozu (Ninjago), a character in Ninjago
