= Brunier =

Brunier is a surname. Notable people with the surname include:

- Bill Brunier (1889–1956), Australian rules footballer
- Charles Brunier (1901–2007), French murderer and veteran of both World Wars who claimed to have been the inspiration for the book Papillon
- Jean Brunier (1896–1981), French racing cyclist
- Ludwig Brunier (1825–1905), German writer and literary critic
- Serge Brunier (born 1958), photographer, reporter and writer who has specialised in popular depictions of astronomical subjects
- Yves Brunier (born 1943), French puppeteer
- Yves Brunier (architect) (1962–1991), French architect

== See also ==
- 10943 Brunier, an asteroid named after Serge Brunier
