= Sunshine Coast Gympie Rugby League =

Australian sporting competition

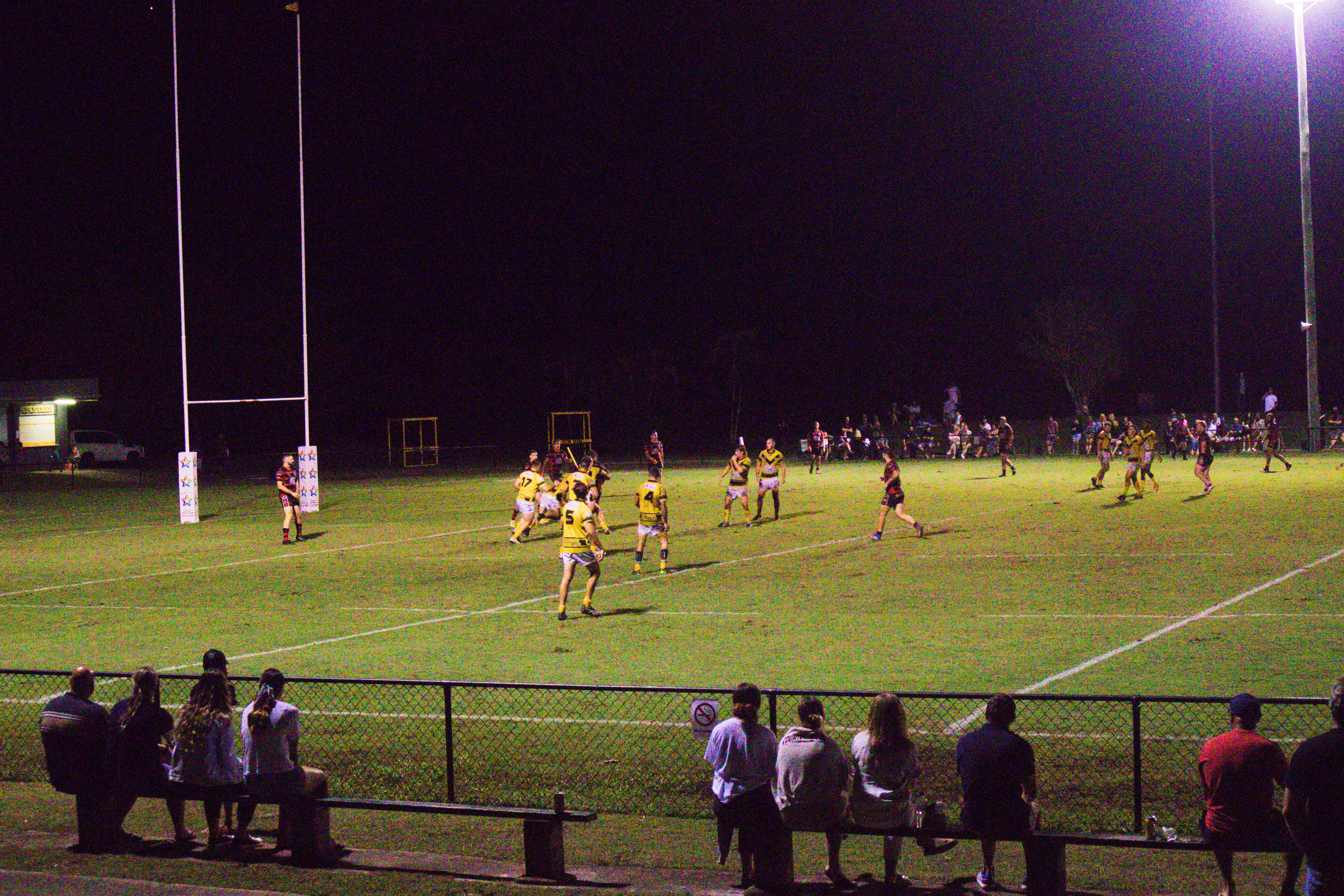
- Sport: Rugby League
- Jurisdiction: Sunshine Coast, Queensland
- Abbreviation: SCGRL
- Founded: 1920
- Affiliation: Queensland Rugby League

Official website
- rugbyleaguesunshinecoast.com
- (Queensland)
- (Australia)

The Sunshine Coast Gympie Rugby League is the local rugby league competition on Australia's Sunshine Coast. Through SCGRL Limited it serves as the governing body for rugby league on the Sunshine Coast.

== History ==
The Sunshine Coast Gympie Rugby League started life as the North Coast Rugby League in 1920 after all of the clubs comprising the corresponding rugby union competition changed codes en masse. Among the clubs playing that first season were Pomona, Cooroy, Eumundi, Yandina, Nambour, Woombye, Palmwoods, Buderim and Mooloolah.

In the area served by the SCGRL competition there have been leagues based in Maleny and Gympie

The start to the 2020 season was disrupted by the then recent outbreak of the Coronavirus, which was formally declared a pandemic on 11 March 2020.

On 16 June of that year, it was reported that a number of clubs – including six Division 1 clubs – did not nominate sides for the 2020 season by the June 15h deadline. The season was eventually cancelled.

Out of our nine clubs with A Grade teams, six teams decided not to nominate teams this year.

— SCGRL statement

The League returned in 2021.

== Sunshine Coast Gympie Rugby League Teams ==
The Sunshine Coast Gympie Rugby League Premiership currently has 16 clubs, for the senior and junior divisions. While some clubs field teams in the junior and senior divisions, not all clubs are in the junior division and not all clubs are in the senior division.

=== Senior Division ===
Club	Colours	Nickname	Founded	Homeground	Suburb/s	No. of A-Grade Premierships	A-Grade Premiership Years
A Grade Clubs
Beerwah		Bulldogs	1979	Beerwah Sportsground	Beerwah	2	2023-24
Caboolture		Snakes	1969	Bob Day Oval	Caboolture	4	1984, 1986, 1994, 2011
Caloundra		Sharks	1969	Tinonee Oval, Caloundra Jrl	Caloundra	4	2002, 2009, 2014, 2026
Coolum		Colts	1989	Ronnie Cargill Oval	Coolum	0	None
Kawana		Dolphins	1992	Kawana Sports Precinct	Kawana	6	1993, 1995, 2012-13, 2015, 2021
Maroochydore		Swans	1969	Maroochydore Jrl	Maroochydore	9	1985, 1990-91, 1996, 1998, 2000, 2016, 2018, 2022
Nambour		Crushers	1985	Nambour Jrl	Nambour	4	1987-88, 2003-05
Noosa		Pirates	1970	Tewantin Sports Complex	Noosa	5	1997, 2006-08, 2017
Stanley River		Wolves		Woodford Showgrounds	Woodford	2	1992, 2025
Reserve Grade Clubs
Gympie		Devils	1998	Jack Stokes Oval	Gympie	1	2010
C Grade Clubs
Beachmere		Pelicans	2003	Beachmere Sports Ground	Beachmere	0	None
Bribie Island		Warrigals	1973	Bernie Foley Oval	Bribie Island	2	1999, 2001
Kilcoy		Yowies	1969	Yowie park	Kilcoy	0	None
Mary Valley		Stags		Jack Spicer Oval	Kandanga	0	None
Pomona-Cooran (Defunct 2024-)		Cutters	1920	Chris Kenny Oval	Cooran, Pomona	0	None
Palmwoods		Devils	1969	Briggs Park	Palmwoods	0	None
Yandina		Raiders	1920	Yandina Multi Purpose Complex	Yandina	0	None

Note: Teams listed by their highest grade. All teams in A Grade comp field a Reserve Grade team apart from Gympie who only field a Reserve Grade team.

== Sunshine Coast Gympie Rugby League Grand Final results ==
Premiers from 1984 onwards are shown; 1920-1983 premiers are unknown.

Season	Grand Final Information				Minor Premiers
Season	Premiers	Score	Runners-up	Venue	Minor Premiers
1984	Caboolture Snakes
1985	Maroochydore Swans
1986	Caboolture Snakes
1987	Nambour Crushers
1988	Nambour Crushers
1989	Brisbane Broncos (C)		Beerwah Bulldogs
1990	Maroochydore Swans
1991	Maroochydore Swans
1992	Stanley River Wolves
1993	Kawana Dolphins
1994	Caboolture Snakes
1995	Kawana Dolphins
1996	Maroochydore Swans
1997	Noosa Pirates
1998	Maroochydore Swans
1999	Bribie Island Warrigals
2000	Maroochydore Swans
2001	Bribie Island Warrigals
2002	Caloundra Sharks
2003	Nambour Crushers
2004	Nambour Crushers
2005	Nambour Crushers
2006	Noosa Pirates
2007	Noosa Pirates
2008	Noosa Pirates
2009	Caloundra Sharks
2010	Gympie Devils
2011	Caboolture Snakes
2012	Kawana Dolphins
2013	Kawana Dolphins
2014	Caloundra Sharks
2015	Kawana Dolphins
2016	Maroochydore Swans
2017	Noosa Pirates
2018	Maroochydore Swans	22-20	Beerwah Bulldogs
2019	Stanley River Wolves	28-16	Caboolture Snakes	Sun. Coast Stadium
2020	Cancelled Due To COVID
2021	Kawana Dolphins	22-10	Maroochydore Swans	Sun. Coast Stadium
2022	Maroochydore Swans	26-16	Beerwah Bulldogs	Sun. Coast Stadium	Maroochydore Swans
2023	Beerwah Bulldogs	12-10	Kawana Dolphins	Sun. Coast Stadium	Beerwah Bulldogs
2024	Beerwah Bulldogs	20-16	Coolum Colts	Sun. Coast Stadium	Coolum Colts
2025	Stanley River Wolves	22-20	Maroochydore Swans	Sun. Coast Stadium	Stanley River Wolves
2026	Caloundra Sharks	20-12	Coolum Colts	Sun. Coast Stadium	Coolum Colts

(C) = Colts

== Sunshine Coast Gympie Junior Rugby League ==
=== Junior Division ===
Colours	Club	Nickname	Founded	Homeground	Suburb/s
	Beachmere	Pelicans		Beachmere Sports Ground	Beachmere
	Bribie Island	Warrigals		Bernie Foley Oval	Bribie Island
	Beerwah	Bulldogs	1979	Beerwah Sportsground	Beerwah
	Caboolture	Snakes		Bob Day Oval	Caboolture
	Caloundra	Sharks		Tinonee Oval, Caloundra Jrl	Caloundra
	Coolum	Colts		Ronnie Cargill Oval	Coolum
	Gympie	Devils		Jack Stokes Oval Albert Park	Gympie
	Kawana	Dolphins		Kawana Sports Precinct	Kawana
	Nirimba	Hurricanes	2022	Nirimba Sports Complex	Nirimba
	Maroochydore	Swans		Maroochydore Jrl	Maroochydore
	Nambour	Crushers		Nambour Jrl	Nambour
	Noosa	Pirates		Tewantin Sports Complex Christensen Oval	Noosa
	Pomona-Cooran	Cutters		Chris Kenny Oval	Cooran, Pomona
	Palmwoods	Devils		Briggs Park	Palmwoods
	Stanley River	Wolves		Woodford Showgrounds	Woodford
