= Southern Hydrate Ridge =

Southern Hydrate Ridge, located about 90 km offshore Oregon Coast, is an active methane seeps site located on the southern portion of Hydrate Ridge. It extends 25 km in length and 15 km across, trending north-northeast-south-southwest at the depth of approximately 800 m. Southern Hydrate Ridge has been the site of numerous submersible dives with the human occupied Alvin submarine, extensive visits by numerous robotic vehicles including the Canadian ROV ROPOS, Jason (US National Deep Submersible Facility), and Tiburon (MBARI), and time-series geophysical studies that document changes in the subsurface distribution of methane. It is also a key site of the National Science Foundations Regional Cabled Array that is part of the Ocean Observatories Initiative (OOI), which includes eight types of cabled instruments streaming live data back to shore 24/7/365 at the speed of light, as well as uncabled instruments.

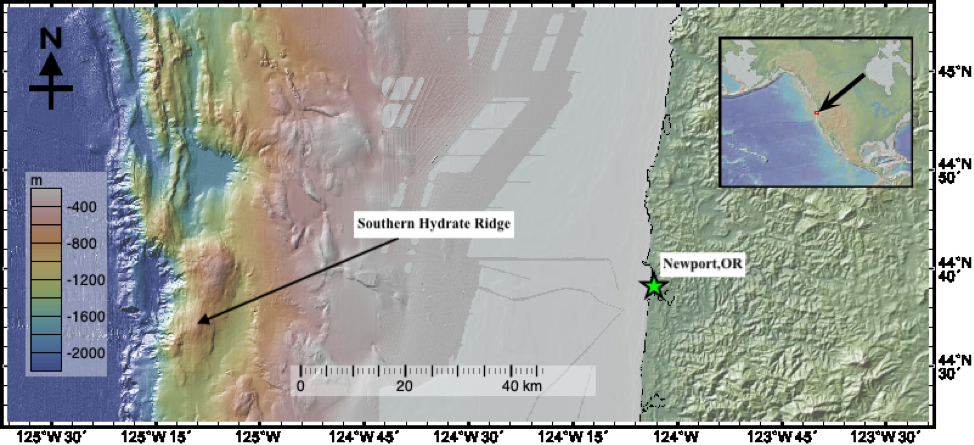
Location of Southern Hydrate Ridge (indicated by black arrow). Green star marks the location of Newport Oregon.

== Geological background ==
The geologic history of the Southern Hydrate Ridge has been reconstructed through seismic imaging, which provides constraints on the origin of methane ice deposits found in this region. Hydrate Ridge is in a region where faults along the Cascadia Margin transition from seaward-verging to landward-verging. This fault reorientation corresponds to the transition from sedimentary accretion to subduction in this active accretionary margin. Seaward-verging thrust faults characterize the ridge deformation front, extending down to ~7 km beneath the summit. Initiation of the uplift of Southern Hydrate Ridge is predicted to have initiated about 1 million years ago.

=== Sedimentary characteristics ===
Clay-rich sediments have been found at the Southern Hydrate Ridge. These sediments are from Pleistocene to Holocene in age, and composed of 29% smectite, 31% illite, and 40% (chlorite + kaolinite) on average. Underlying the Pleistocene-Holocene strata is the late-Pliocene-early-Pleistocene accretionary material, composed of 38% smectite, 27% illite, and 35% (chlorite + kaolinite). A thick permeable zone of coarse-grained turbidites underlies the sediments.

Located along the Cascadia accretionary margin, sediment build-up in this region is driven by two subduction-related processes:

1. Scraping of sediments off of the subducting Juan de Fuca plate onto the overlying North American plate, and
1. Underplating of subducted sediments onto the overlying plate.

Continuous duplexing and underplating of sediment has caused thickening of sediments through uplifting. Furthermore, compaction and dewatering in this region has led to increased local pore pressure.

== Methane Ice at Southern Hydrate Ridge ==
Methane ice at Southern Hydrate Ridge has been found within the shallow sediments, and more rarely exposed on the seafloor. Because Southern Hydrate Ridge is located on the upper continental slope, the regional hydrate stability zone (RHSZ), which is controlled by the sediment pore pressure and temperature, is very shallow. As organic material in the sediments is utilized by microbes, producing methane saturation within the sediment pores, methane ice forms within the RHSZ. The base of the RHSZ marks the transition from methane-ice-rich sediment, to clay sediments. Due to the impedance contrast between RHSZ and the underlying sediments, the depth of RHSZ can be detected using seismic imaging techniques.

=== Associated microbially-mediated carbonate formations ===
Methane hydrate formation is associated with extensive authigenic carbonate. These carbonate deposits are associated with the local chemosynthetic communities such as sulfide-oxidizing bacteria, mussels, vesicomyid clams, snails and tube worms (although tube worms are not observed at Southern Hydrate Ridge). Migration and egress of methane-rich fluids and microbial interactions can lead to the formation of chemoherms through anaerobic oxidation of methane. At Southern Hydrate Ridge, in addition to a gentle rampart of authigenic carbonate cobbles that rims the main seep site, there is a 60-m tall massive carbonate deposit called the Pinnacle. Uranium-thorium dating of carbonate material from the Pinnacle indicates that the Pinnacle is between ~ 7,000 and 11,000 years old.

=== Methane venting: spatial and temporal discontinuity ===
Methane venting includes the release of methane in the form of fluid and gases from methane seeps as methane ice dissociates. Due to the narrow RHSZ at the upper continental slope, methane ice at Southern Hydrate Ridge is metastable such that changes in seafloor temperature and pressure may lead to destabilization of methane ice and the disassociation into fluid and gas.

Methane venting at Southern Hydrate Ridge has been observed to be transient and episodic with temporal variations of hours to days. This area is characterized by multiple sites of venting. which is thought to reflect different fracture networks. While active venting may maintain open fracture networks, fractures may also be filled by hydrates when there is no venting. As venting reactivates, a new fracture system may be created. While temporal and spatial variations in venting have been observed at this seep site, the local venting rate has been found to varyi over six orders of magnitude: the controls are still not well understood. New instrumentation at this site, including cabled multibeam sonar systems developed by the University of Bremen, now image the entire seep area of Southern Hydrate Ridge, scanning for plumes every two hours. An overview sonar and quantification sonar at the main study site "Einsteins Grotto", are providing new insights into the temporal, spatial and intensity of the plumes and quantification of methane flux from this highly dynamic environment.

=== Significance ===
Release of methane from marine seep sites into the atmosphere may have been a factor for past climate warming events, such as the Paleocene-Eocene Thermal Maximum (PETM). It is estimated that there are Gigatons of carbon trapped as methane in margin environments and the release of methane from seeps is thought to be responsible for 5 to 10% of the global atmospheric methane.

== Scientific investigation ==
Since the discovery of methane seeps and novel microbial and macrofauna at Hydrate Ridge in 1986, the Southern Hydrate Ridge has become an extensive study site. Currently, it is one of the study sites under the OOI Regional Cabled Array. Infrastructure, including a diverse suite of instruments, was installed and became fully operational in 2014. Sensors that are currently at this site include:

- Pressure Sensor measures the pressure exerted by the overlying water column at the seafloor and is installed to study the impacts of lunar tides on methane release.
- Current Meter measures the current velocity and temperature of the water using acoustic signals.
- Acoustic Doppler Current Profiler (ADCP) measures the current velocity of the water profile in the region using acoustic signals. This instrument is installed by the OOI for understanding the local fluxes of heat, mass and momentum. An example of such application is the study of bubble plume evolution over time.
- Digital Still Camera records the changes in seafloor morphology and biology, as well as methane plumes. This is important to understand how the local system and biosphere evolves through time.
- Mass Spectrometer measures the dissolved gas concentration, which is important for understanding the local biogeochemical processes and quantification of methane release from the seafloor.
- Low-frequency Hydrophone records sound waves that propagate through the water column for examination of seismic activity.
- Bottom Ocean Seismometers detect seismic activity local and at a regional scale. At Southern Hydrate Ridge, there is currently one broadband seismometer with an accelerator, and three short-period seismometers (for examination local seismic events that may provide insights into the fracture distribution in the subsurface).
- 'Osmo' Fluid Sampler samples the fluid coming issuing from the seep sites through drawing fluid into a capillary tube-like tubing.
- Benthic Flow Sensors measures the fluid flow rates into and out of the sediment, which are important for determining the local methane and sulfide flux into the ocean.
