= Des Mannion =

Australian rugby league player

Personal information
- Full name: Desmond Herbert Mannion
- Born: 8 December 1939; Brisbane, Queensland
- Died: 23 April 1978 (aged 38)

Playing information
- Position: Prop
Club
Years	Team	Pld	T	G	FG	P
1958–69	Fortitude Valley Diehards
1969	South Magpies
	Total	0	0	0	0	0

Desmond Herbert Mannion (8 December 1939 – 23 April 1978) was an Australian rugby league footballer for Fortitude Valley of the Brisbane Rugby League Premiership. A goal-kicking prop, he played 10 seasons with Valleys and captained the club.

== Background ==
Mannion was born in Brisbane, Queensland on 8 December 1939, and grew up in the suburb of Red Hill. In his childhood, he enjoyed playing cricket and rugby league. He was chosen to play in the Queensland Schoolboys Cricket Team. He married Maureen in January 1961, and the couple had twins on 8 December 1961. As a young adult, Mannion had many jobs including working in a brewery, delivering bread and he opened a snack bar on Breakfast Creek Road.

== Playing career ==
18-year-old Mannion began playing for Valleys in 1958. His side reached the grand final in 1958, though they lost 22–7 to Past Brothers. Mannion's side lost the minor semi finals to Wynnum Manly in 1959. Mannion helped Valleys make the grand final in three consecutive years from 1960 to 1962. His team lost to Northern Suburbs 18–5 in 1960, 29–5 in 1961 and 22–0 in 1962. Valleys' 1961 29-5 grand final loss was the biggest grand final loss at the time and remained so until 1979 (when Valleys defeated Southern Suburbs 26–0). Mannion made his 5th and last grand final appearance in 1965. His side lost 15–2 to Redcliffe.

In the 1967 finals, Mannion kicked two field goals in Valleys' 12–8 loss to Brothers (who would later win the premiership in the semi-finals. Mannion finished the 1967 season as the top point scorer of the competition with 175 from 1 try and 86 goals.

In early 1969, Mannion transferred from Valleys to Nambour club, Souths.

Mannion died on 23 April 1978. His father Herbert died the following day.
