= Elizabeth Trembath-Reichert =

Astrobiologist and geomicrobiologist working at ASU

- Education: California Institute of Technology (2010–2016), Barnard College (2004–2008)
- Scientific career
- Fields: Astrobiology, Biogeochemistry, Ecosystem ecology, Environmental Science, Microbiology, Oceanography
- Workplaces: Arizona State University, School of Earth and Space Exploration
- Thesis: Molecular and geochemical insights into microbial life centimeters to kilometers below the seafloor (26 April 2016)
- Website: https://isearch.asu.edu/profile/3323104 https://www2.whoi.edu/staff/etrembathreichert/

Elizabeth Trembath-Reichert (born February, 1986) is a geomicrobiologist and astrobiologist at Arizona State University's School of Earth and Space Exploration.

== Early life and education ==
Trembath-Reichert earned a bachelors degree in environmental science and physics from Barnard College in 2008, graduating Cum Laude. She received a masters degree and a Ph.D. in Geobiology from the California Institute of Technology in 2013 and 2016, respectively. Prior to earning these degrees she worked at NOAA for two years as a physical scientist.

Trembath-Reichert attended California Institute of Technology, where she defended her thesis titled Molecular and Geochemical Insights into Microbial Life Centimeters to Kilometers Below the Seafloor in April of 2016. Her thesis explored the role of life in the cycles of elements such as carbon and silicon.

== Career and research ==
From 2017 to 2019, Trembath-Reichert was a postdoctoral fellow at the Woods Hole Oceanographic Institute's Department of Marine Chemistry and Geochemistry. She also participated in an Ocean Trust expedition to the Lō`ihi Seamount.

Currently, she is an associate professor at Arizona State University whose research focuses on microbially mediated Earth-life interactions to identify key players in global biogeochemical cycles and determine their rates of activity in past and modern environments. Much of her work involves collecting microbial samples from the sea and analyzing them.

Trembath-Reichert has an h-index of 10 and has been cited 737 times. She has also received the L'Oreal award from L'Oréal-UNESCO For Women in Science Programme.

=== Field work ===
Trembath-Reichert was the chief scientist on the Early Career Chief Scientist Training Cruise with the remote vehicle Atlantis in 2018. Additionally, she was also the principal investigator of fieldwork in the Taupo Volcanic Zone at New Zealand in 2018. Other notable fieldwork includes expeditions to the Lō`ihi Seamount in 2013, North Pond in 2017, the Palau Rock Islands in 2016, the Hydrate Ridge in 2011, and Araihazar in Bangladesh in 2008, as the Deep Sea Eukaryotic Life expedition with the Monterey Bay Aquarium Research Institute in 2016, and on the Expedition 337 Deep Coalbed Biosphere off Shimokita.
