= Noosa Pirates =

Australian rugby league football club

Club information
- Full name: Noosa Pirates Rugby League Football Club
- Colours: Blue; Gold

Current details
- Ground: Noosa
- Competition: Sunshine Coast Gympie Rugby League

Records
- Premierships: 8

Noosa Pirates Rugby League Football Club is an Australian rugby league football club based in Noosa formed in 1968. In 2017, the Pirates won their first division one title in the Sunshine Coast Rugby League since 2008.

== Notable Juniors ==
- Rocky Elsom (2003–12 NSW Waratahs & ACT Brumbies)
- Jake Friend (2008–21 Sydney Roosters)
- Moses Mbye (2014– Canterbury Bulldogs)
