= Mary Abbott (artist) =

American artist (1921–2019)

- Born: July 27, 1921; New York City, U.S.
- Died: August 23, 2019 (aged 98); Westhampton Beach, New York, U.S.
- Known for: Painting
- Movement: Abstract Expressionism

Mary Lee Abbott (July 27, 1921 – August 23, 2019) was an American artist, known as a member of the New York School of abstract expressionists in the late 1940s and 1950s. Her abstract and figurative work were also influenced by her time spent in Saint Croix and Haiti, where she lived off and on throughout the 1950s.

== Early life and education ==
Abbott was born in New York City, where she attended the Chapin School. Her family lineage traces back to John Adams, the second president of the United States. Her mother, Elizabeth Grinnell, was a poet and syndicated columnist with Hearst newspapers. Her family would spend time in the summer in Southampton, New York in Long Island.

She was a student of artist George Grosz, while attending the Art Students League of New York. At the experimental school, Subjects of the Artist, Abbott worked with Barnett Newman, Mark Rothko, and David Hare. Abbott then studied in the late 1930s at the Corcoran Museum School (now known as Corcoran School of the Arts and Design) in Washington, D.C.

She was briefly married to painter Lewis Teague from 1943 until 1946. Soon after her separation from Teague, she married businessman Tom Clyde. Clyde and Abbott spent many winters in Haiti and St.Croix. Here, she found many inspirations, such as the people and landscapes, that often inspired her paintings.

== Career and later life ==
After World War II, Abbott began seriously pursuing a career the art world and she joined the "Downtown Group", which represented a group of artists who lived in lower Manhattan. In 1946, she set up an art studio on Tenth Street in Manhattan. Her location in Manhattan granted her access to a sort of inner circle of artists. Philip Pavia invited her to be one of the only three women included in "The Artist's Club" alongside Elaine de Kooning and Perle Fine. "Generally speaking the women at the Club weren't treated differently than anyone else -- an artist was an artist. Sometimes you might get treated like a girl because you were pretty. I was chosen to collect the dues and go buy the booze because I was pretty and the guys would pay up if I asked them to. Other times you had to be tough to be taken seriously," Abbott said. In 1948–49, she took artistic development influence from Willem de Kooning. Her use of large-scale gesture is significantly different after his lecture at the Subjects of the Artist. Abbott and de Kooning, alongside others including Jackson Pollock and Robert Motherwell, frequently visited the Cedar Tavern. This tavern is hailed as a famous meeting place for the Abstract Expressionist thinkers. Abbott has said that while there, they discussed ideas, art, and philosophy.

In the 1950s, Abbott began a collaborative project between herself and Barbara Guest, a first-generation poet at the New York School. Abbott made paintings she called "poetry paintings" that were directly inspired by the words and images associated with Guest's poetry.

Her paintings feature bright colors and were inspired by nature and her time spent traveling in the Caribbean islands.

In 2016 her work was included in the exhibition Women of Abstract Expressionism organized by the Denver Art Museum.

She died at age 98 on August 23, 2019, of heart failure.

In 2023 her work was included in the exhibition Action, Gesture, Paint: Women Artists and Global Abstraction 1940-1970 at the Whitechapel Gallery in London. From May 9 – June 28, 2025, the Schoelkopf Gallery mounted a retrospective of her work titled, Mary Abbott: To Draw Imagination.

== See also ==
- Art movement
- Action painting
- Abstract Expressionism
