= Ben Ross =

Australian rugby league footballer (born 1980)

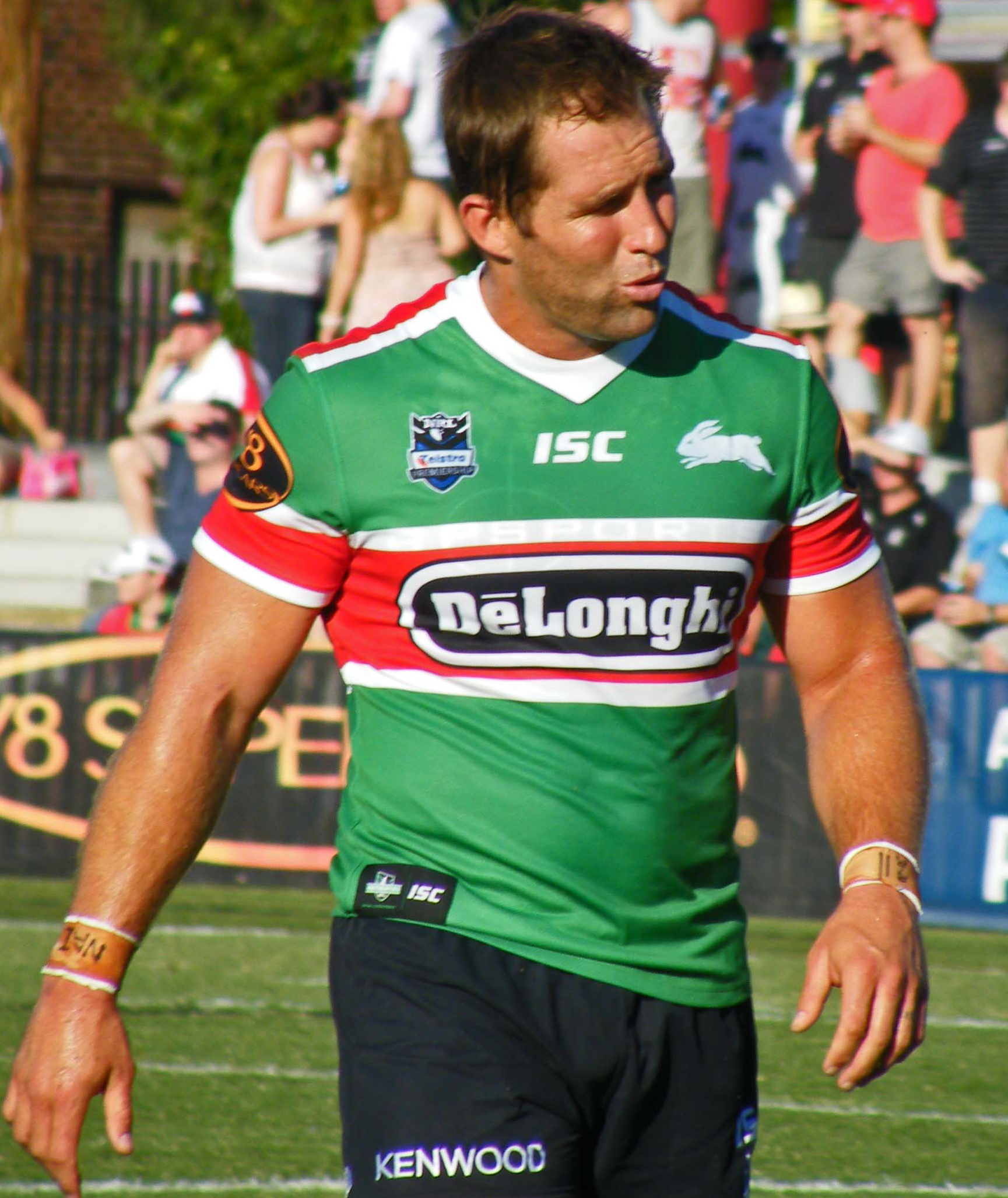

Personal information
- Full name: Benjamin David Ross
- Born: 23 May 1980 (age 46) Chinchilla, Queensland, Australia

Playing information
- Height: 191 cm (6 ft 3 in)
- Weight: 110 kg (17 st 5 lb)
- Position: Prop
Club
Years	Team	Pld	T	G	FG	P
2002	St. George Illawarra	8	0	0	0	0
2003–05	Penrith Panthers	56	4	0	0	16
2006–09	Cronulla Sharks	45	2	0	0	8
2010–11	South Sydney	24	1	0	0	4
2012–13	Cronulla Sharks	41	1	0	0	4
	Total	174	8	0	0	32
Representative
Years	Team	Pld	T	G	FG	P
2004–05	Queensland	6	0	0	0	0
2005	Prime Minister's XIII	1	0	0	0	0

Benjamin David "Ben" Ross (born 23 May 1980) is an Australian former professional rugby league footballer who played in the 2000s and 2010s. A Queensland State of Origin representative forward, he played in the National Rugby League for the St. George Illawarra Dragons, Penrith Panthers, with whom he won the 2003 NRL Premiership, the Cronulla-Sutherland Sharks and the South Sydney Rabbitohs.

== Background ==
Ross was born in Chinchilla, Queensland, Australia.

He played junior football for the Nambour Crushers.

== Playing career ==
In 2002, Ross made his NRL debut for the St George Illawarra Dragons in a match against the Melbourne Storm.

Signing with Penrith in 2003, Ross helped to kick the season off to a blistering start after becoming involved in a brawl with Brisbane Broncos captain Gorden Tallis. Ross was on the receiving end of a series of upper-cut punches thrown by Tallis when Brisbane met Penrith in the first round of the year. Both players were sin binned for ten minutes and no further action was taken by the NRL Judiciary. The Australian Football League (AFL) CEO, Wayne Jackson, used the incident to criticise the rival code which led to cross-border media exchanges. NRL CEO, David Gallop, ordered a policy change which would enable players to be charged for on-field fights.

Ross was a member of Penrith's 2003 NRL grand final-winning team, playing from the interchange bench in their 18–6 win over the Sydney Roosters. As 2003 NRL premiers, Penrith travelled to England to face Super League VIII champions, Bradford in the 2004 World Club Challenge. Ross played from the interchange bench in the Penrith's 22–4 loss. Following his successful season at Penrith, Ross was selected to represent Queensland as an interchange for all six games of the 2004 and 2005 State of Origin series.

Although signed with Penrith until the end of 2007, Penrith announced they would have to release Ross due to salary-cap concerns. Ross joined the Cronulla-Sutherland Sharks in 2006 but had little game time that year due to injury. In round 8, playing against his previous club, Penrith, Ross damaged his left knee tackling former flat-mate, Joel Clinton, in the first few minutes of the match. He was able to participate in the majority of the 2007 season but was side-lined for the remainder of the season.

In 2008, Ross was knocked out in Cronulla's season opener against the Manly-Warringah Sea Eagles but miraculously recovered to play in the team's round two encounter against the Storm in Melbourne. Ross in that match was sent off late in the second half for his late charge on Storm halfback Cooper Cronk which subsequently earned him a seven-match suspension.

After suffering neck injury playing for Cronulla in the opening round of the 2009 NRL season Ross was sidelined for the remainder of the season. Vowing to return to the playing field, he was thrown a lifeline by the South Sydney Rabbitohs who gave him a contract. After undergoing surgery and rehabilitation, almost two years later Ross made his return to the playing field for South Sydney in the 2010 NRL season.

Ross announced his retirement at the end of the 2013 NRL season. In the 2014 pre-season he rejected an offer to play in the Super League for the London Broncos, preferring to take up a welfare management role with the Men of League Foundation.

=== Career highlights ===
- First Grade Debut: 2002 – Round 6, St. George Illawarra vs Melbourne at Olympic Park, 20 April
- Premierships: 2003 – Penrith Panthers defeated Sydney Roosters
- Representative Selection: 2004 – Queensland State of Origin

== Off-field ==
Ross was crowned the Sexiest Man in League in 2005 following a nationwide phone poll. Later that year he was one of twelve of the Hottest Players in the NRL that posed for the League of Their Own 2006 calendar that was produced in the style of the Dieux du Stade calendars to raise money for the Koori Kids foundation.

In 2006, Ross again posed in the nude for the Naked Rugby League 2007–08 charity calendar, with its sales to benefit the National Breast Cancer Foundation of Australia.

On 11 June 2015, Ross participated in an arm wrestling match against Wendell Sailor on The NRL Footy Show. However, his arm gave way and was immediately rushed to hospital.
