= Hubert Park Beck =

American psychologist and author

- Born: 1907
- Died: January 16, 1989 (aged 81–82); New York City, U.S.
- Education: Columbia University
- Occupation: Educational psychologist
- Employer: City College of New York
- Spouse: Dorothy Fahs
- Children: 1 daughter
- Relatives: Sophia Lyon Fahs (mother-in-law)

Hubert Park Beck (1907 – January 16, 1989) was an American educational psychologist, and the writer of a book about the boards of trustees of 30 major U.S. universities.

== Early life ==
Beck was born in 1907. He earned a PhD in Educational Psychology from Columbia University in 1945.

== Career ==
Beck began his career as a science teacher in Bronxville, New York. In 1947, he became an assistant professor of Educational Psychology at the City College of New York. He remained a faculty member at CCNY for three decades, having been a full professor from 1969 to 1977.

Beck was the secretary of the New York City chapter of the National Education Association. He served on the board of trustees of the New Lincoln School. In 1986, he endowed a research doctoral dissertation grant program later known as the Fahs-Beck Fund for Research and Experimentation.

=== Research ===
Beck authored Men Who Control Our Universities, a book about the boards of trustees of 30 major U.S. universities, including state and private universities, in 1934-1935. By studying the professions, income levels, ages, sexes and religions of trustees, Beck found that most of them were wealthy Protestant male businessmen, bankers or lawyers over 60. Beck argued that the trustees lacked an understanding of the working class or the under-privileged, and he added that they had no experience with teaching or academic research or administration. In a review for The Elementary School Journal, Thomas H. Hamilton of the University of Chicago agreed with Beck that the trustees' social status might be a problem, but he did not believe that appointing trustees with teaching or research experience would necessarily lead to better decisions. He added that the topic was under-researched and that the book was "a competent volume." Reviewing it for the American Sociological Review, Scott Nearing concluded, "His study substantiates and documents the oft-repeated observation that the same men who run the banks and factories and operate the railroads of the United States also control and direct the institutions of higher education."

== Personal life and death ==
Beck married Dorothy Fahs, the daughter of Unitarian activist Sophia Lyon Fahs. They had a daughter Rebecca, and they resided in Manhattan. He died on January 16, 1989, at age 81.

== Selected works ==
- Beck, Hubert Park (1947). Men Who Control Our Universities: The Economic and Social Composition of Governing Boards of 30 Leading American Universities. New York: King's Crown Press. OCLC 458370299.
