= Moses Mbye =

Australian rugby league footballer

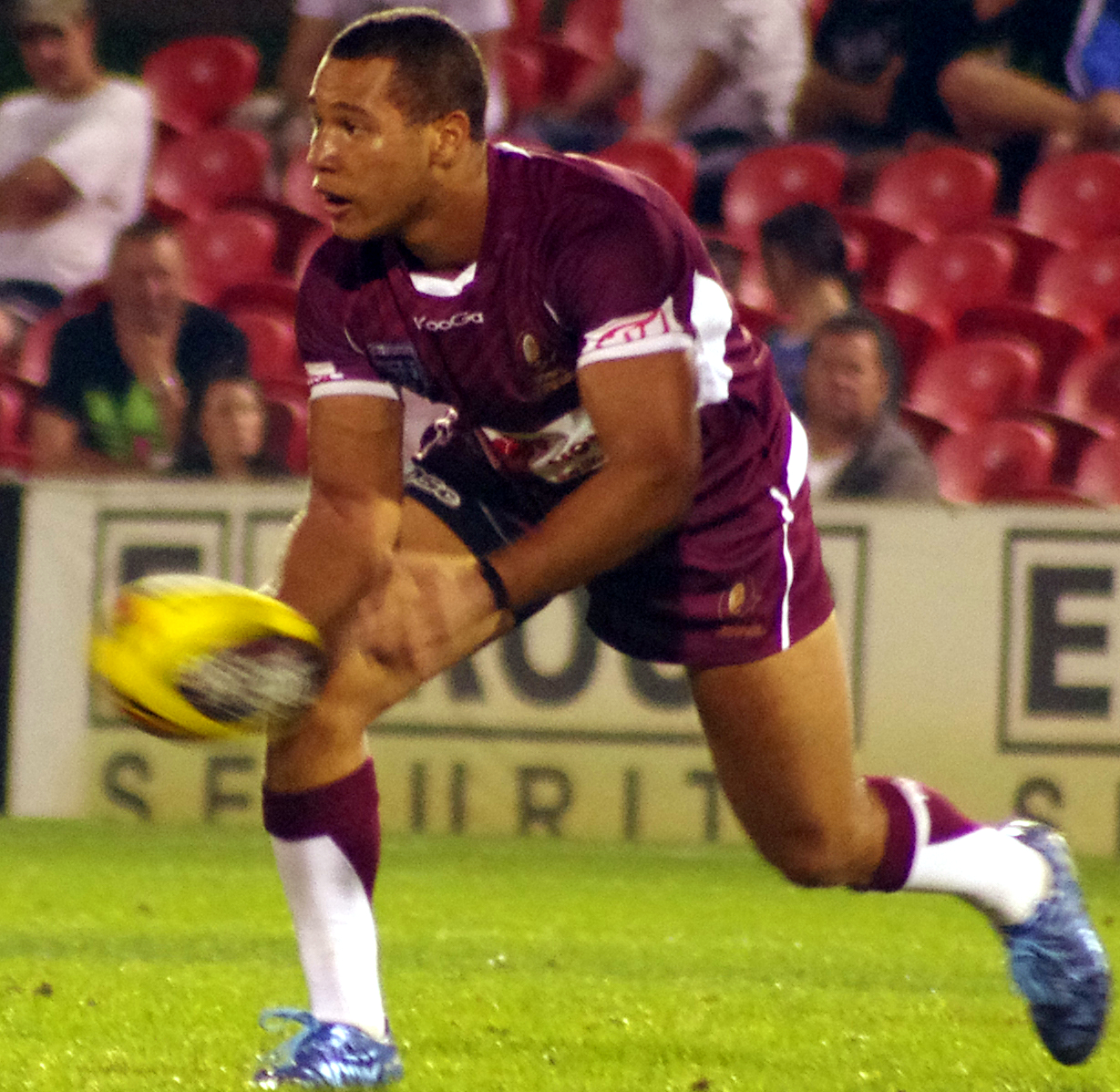

Personal information
- Born: 13 August 1993 (age 33) Brisbane, Queensland, Australia
- Height: 180 cm (5 ft 11 in)
- Weight: 89 kg (14 st 0 lb)

Playing information
- Position: Scrum-half, Fullback, Centre, Stand-off, Hooker
Club
Years	Team	Pld	T	G	FG	P
2014–18	Canterbury Bulldogs	94	17	101	2	272
2018–21	Wests Tigers	63	9	39	0	114
2022–23	St. George Illawarra	37	2	1	0	10
2023–25	St Helens	61	6	0	1	25
	Total	255	34	141	3	421
Representative
Years	Team	Pld	T	G	FG	P
2016	Prime Minister's XIII	1	0	0	0	0
2017	World All Stars	1	0	0	0	0
2019	Queensland	3	0	0	0	0
- Source: As of 20 November 2026

Moses Mbye (born 13 August 1993) is an Australian professional rugby league footballer who last played for Ipswich Jets in the Queensland Cup.

Over the course of his career he has played as a scrum-half, fullback, centre, stand-off and hooker. He previously played for the Canterbury-Bankstown Bulldogs, St. George Illawarra Dragons and Wests Tigers in the National Rugby League (NRL), and at representative level for the Prime Minister's XIII, World All Stars and Queensland in the State of Origin series.

== Background ==
Mbye was born in Brisbane, Queensland, Australia, and is of Gambian descent through his father, making him one of the few players in the NRL to be of African descent.

== Playing career ==
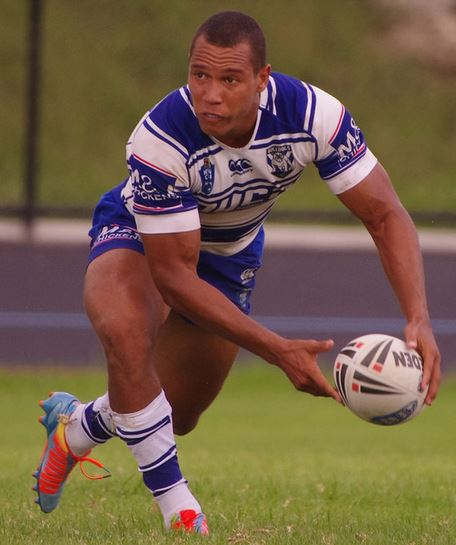
Mbye playing for the Bulldogs in 2014

Mbye played his junior rugby league for the Noosa Pirates. He played for the Pirates first grade side at age 17.

=== Early career ===
From 2011 to 2013, Mbye played for the Canterbury-Bankstown Bulldogs' NYC team. On 21 April 2012, he played for the Queensland under-20s team against the New South Wales under-20s team. In 2013, he captained the Bulldogs' NYC team. On 20 April 2013, he again played for the Queensland under-20s team against the New South Wales under-20s team. On 13 October 2013, he played for the Junior Kangaroos against the Junior Kiwis.

=== 2014 ===
In 2014, Mbye moved on to Canterbury's New South Wales Cup team. He played for Canterbury in the inaugural Auckland Nines tournament. On 14 March, he re-signed with the Canterbury outfit on a two-year contract. In round 8, he made his NRL debut for Canterbury against the Newcastle Knights, playing at centre replacing an injured Tim Lafai in the 16-12 win at ANZ Stadium. During the week leading up to the clubs 2014 NRL Grand Final against the South Sydney Rabbitohs, Mbye and Reni Maitua were both in contention to fill the vacant hooker role for the match after regular hooker and captain Michael Ennis was ruled out with a foot injury. Mbye was eventually given the nod over the more experienced Maitua in the 30-6 loss. He made 44 tackles, the most in the match.

=== 2015 ===
In the preseason, Mbye again played for the Canterbury club in the Auckland Nines. In 2015, he established himself as a regular part of the Bulldogs' side. His form saw the interest for his signature in 2017 rise significantly. In Round 4 against the Wests Tigers, he kicked a field goal in golden-point extra time to win the match for Canterbury, 25-24. In Round 7 against the Manly Warringah Sea Eagles, he scored his first NRL career try in the 28-16 win at ANZ Stadium. He finished off the 2015 season having played in 23 matches, scoring three tries, kicking 15 goals and two field goals.

=== 2016 ===
On 12 January, Mbye was selected in the Queensland Academy of Sport Emerging Maroons squad. On 13 February, Mbye extended his contract with the Canterbury side to the end of the 2020 season, earning around $750,000 a season. Mbye finished the 2016 NRL season playing in all of Canterbury's 25 matches and was their highest point scorer with 100 points by scoring nine tries and kicking 32 goals. On 24 September, Mbye played for Prime Minister's XIII against Papua New Guinea, playing off the interchange bench in the 58-0 win at Port Moresby.

=== 2017 ===
On 10 February, Mbye played in the 2017 All Stars match for the World All Stars, starting at halfback in the 34-8 loss. In Round 18, at Belmore Sports Ground, against the Newcastle Knights, the Bulldogs were losing 18-14 with two minutes remaining. A kick from Brock Lamb ricocheted into Mbye's legs and he then scooted away 80m to score. at the End of the year Moses Mbye was offered a contract from Samoa but denied it cause he wanted no injuries during the preseason.

Mbye finished his 2017 season with 22 games, scoring two tries and kicking 15 goals, with a total of 38 points.

=== 2018 ===
On 29 May, Mbye signed a four-year deal to join the Wests Tigers starting 2019. In June, he was granted a mid season switch to join Wests, he played his final game for Canterbury, a 32-10 defeat by the Gold Coast Titans at Belmore Oval which meant it was Canterbury's worst start to a season in 54 years.

Mbye made his first appearance for Wests Tigers on 1 July. He played in every game at fullback for the rest of the season, with the team winning 5 of those 9 matches, and scored 3 tries.

=== 2019 ===
With the arrival of new coach Michael Maguire, Mbye was named Wests Tigers' captain in the pre-season. Mbye contacted Benji Marshall and Jake Friend, uncertain whether he should accept the position. Team-mate Marshall said, "I don’t think he understands that when he talks everyone listens. The thing I like the most is he doesn’t enjoy shit standards. He doesn’t walk past things that he doesn’t like. He drives standards really hard. I think that is a big reason why he is captain." Despite his club issues, Mbye played a starring role in Queensland Game 1 victory in 2019 State of Origin series.

Mbye collapsed at a hotel in Perth before the second game of the 2019 State of Origin series. According to reports, Mbye was found slumped on the floor in the Queensland team's hotel. Mbye was lucky to have been found so quickly after falling into an anaphylactic shock, assumed to be the result of an allergic reaction. Mbye was later medically cleared to play in Game 2 of the series as Queensland lost 38-6 at the new Perth Stadium. Mbye was retained for Game 3 of the series as Queensland lost the match and the series overall in the final seconds of the game.

=== 2020 ===
Mbye made a total of 15 appearances for the Wests Tigers in the 2020 NRL season which saw the club finish 11th on the table.

=== 2021 ===
On 18 August, Mbye signed a contract to join St. George Illawarra starting in the 2022 season. Mbye played a total of 22 matches for the Wests Tigers in the 2021 NRL season as the club finished 13th and missed the finals.

=== 2022 ===
In round 1 of the 2022 NRL season, Mbye made his club debut for St. George Illawarra in their 28-16 victory over the New Zealand Warriors scoring a try. Mbye played 22 games for the club in 2022 as they finished 10th on the table and missed the finals.

=== 2023 ===
On 24 July, it was announced that Mbye had signed a two-and-half-year deal to join English side St Helens with immediate effect. Mbye made his club debut for St Helens in round 20 of the 2023 Super League season. St Helens would defeat Leeds 22-18.

=== 2024 ===
In round 21 of the 2024 Super League season, Mbye kicked the winning drop goal for St Helens in their 17-16 golden point extra-time victory over Salford. Mbye played 23 games for St Helens in the 2024 Super League season which saw the club finish sixth on the table. He played in St Helens golden point extra-time playoff loss against Warrington.

=== 2025 ===
On 28 August, Mbye announced he would be leaving St Helens at the end of the 2025 Super League season. Mbye played 25 games for St Helens in the 2025 Super League season including the clubs 20-12 semi-final loss against Hull Kingston Rovers.

=== 2026 ===
On 17 August 2026 it was reported that he had chosen to retire

== Statistics ==
Season	Team	Matches	T	GK	F/G	Pts
2014	Canterbury-Bankstown Bulldogs	9	0	0	0	0
2015	Canterbury-Bankstown Bulldogs	23	3	15	2	44
2016	Canterbury-Bankstown Bulldogs	25	9	32	0	100
2017	Canterbury-Bankstown Bulldogs	23	2	18	0	44
2018	Canterbury-Bankstown Bulldogs	14	3	36	0	84
2018	Wests Tigers	9	3	0	0	12
2019	Wests Tigers	17	1	10	0	24
2020	Wests Tigers	15	4	29	0	74
2021	Wests Tigers	22	1	0	0	4
2022	St. George Illawarra Dragons	22	2	1	0	10
2023	St. George Illawarra Dragons	15	0	0	0	0
2023	St. Helens	11	2	0	0	8
2024	St. Helens	25	3	0	1	13
2025	St. Helens	13	0	0	0	0
	Totals	241	33	141	3	416

* accurate as of end of 2024 season.
