= Adderley Wilkinson =

Irish cricketer

Personal information
- Full name: Adderley Edward Wilkinson
- Born: Q3 1887; Dunshaughlin, Ireland
- Died: 1 April 1978 (aged 90); Enniskerry, Leinster, Ireland
- Batting: Unknown

Domestic team information
- Years: Team
- 1920/21: Europeans (India)

Career statistics
Competition	First-class
Matches	1
Runs scored	5
Batting average	2.50
100s/50s	–/–
Top score	5
Catches/stumpings	2/–
- Source: ESPNcricinfo, 30 November 2018

Adderley Edward Wilkinson (Q3 1887 – 1 April 1978) was an Irish first-class cricketer.

Wilkinson was born at Dunshaughlin in County Meath in the third quarter of 1887, and later studied at Trinity College Dublin, where he played rugby union for Dublin University Football Club. Graduating as with a degree in engineering, he later played first-class cricket in British India for the Europeans against the Indians at Madras in December 1920. Batting twice in the match, Wilkinson opened the batting in the Europeans first-innings, and was dismissed without scoring by C. R. Ganapathy. Following-on in their second-innings, he was dismissed by C. K. Krishnaswamy for 5 runs. Fellow Irishman John Gwynn was also a member of the Europeans team. Outside of cricket, he worked as an engineer and an actor. He died at Enniskerry in April 1978.
