= Carole Garnett-Wheeler =

American swimmer and swimming/diving coach (1898–1978)

Personal information
- Born: September 16, 1898 Narragansett, Rhode Island, United States
- Died: April 12, 1978 (aged 79) Wakefield, Rhode Island, United States

Sport
- Sport: Swimming

Carole Garnett-Wheeler (September 16, 1898 – April 12, 1978) was a competitive swimmer from Rhode Island. Born in Narragansett, Rhode Island, she was a member of the U.S. women's swim team during the 1924 Paris Olympics. After retirement, she coached swimming and diving.

Her first husband, Colonel Thomas Ogden Humphreys and she divorced in 1935, and in 1936 she married Henry S. Wheeler (1894 –1967), mayor of Newport, Rhode Island. (Humphreys died in a 1936 car crash.)

She was active in her community, serving a term as president of the Rhode Island Republican Women's Club. Garnett-Wheeler was inducted into the Rhode Island Heritage Hall of Fame in 1968.

She died in Wakefield, Rhode Island on April 12, 1978 and was buried at Island Cemetery in Newport.
