= Hydrate Ridge =

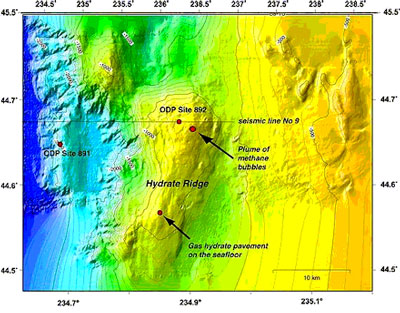
Bathymetry of Hydrate Ridge.

Hydrate Ridge is an accretionary thrust clathrate hydrate formation, meaning it has been made of sediment scraped off of subducting oceanic plate. It is approx. 200 m (700 ft) high, and located 100 km (62 mi) offshore of Oregon. At hydrate formations, methane is trapped in crystallized water structures. Such methane transforms into the gaseous phase and seeps into the ocean at this site, which has been a popular location of study since its discovery in 1986. Hydrate Ridge also supports a methane-driven benthic community.

== Significance ==
Hydrate Ridge and other hydrate formations store methane for extended periods of time. This methane can be released back into the ocean as a result of underwater seismic activity or other sudden movements. Methane is a potent greenhouse gas, and the study of hydrate formations can lead to information about their influences on the global carbon cycle and carbon sequestration.

Because it is one of the most easily accessible hydrate formations in the ocean, and because the global effects of oceanic methane release are still poorly understood, Hydrate Ridge has received significant scientific attention since its discovery. The presence of venting sites and a benthic community there, along with the ridge's association with the Cascadia Subduction Zone (as an accretionary formation), has made it a location at which gas hydrate and subduction zone characteristics are widely studied.

Another motivation to study the ridge has been to uncover methane seeps as a potential source of fossil fuels. Research may reveal the economical value of these structures.

== History of observations ==
The importance of Hydrate Ridge was recognized in 1986, with the discovery of low-temperature venting sites and a methane-driven biological community there. Since then, information has been collected on bubble emission frequencies, plume heights, etc. at the ridge, particularly via the use of ROVs, to further our scientific understanding of it.

A 2001 bubble plume study suggested that the free gas zone (see "Methane Venting") under surface sediments at Hydrate Ridge is thick. If this is the case, and if other active hydrate formations share this characteristic, more methane may be released (and influence climate change) than was anticipated prior to the study, according to researchers.

A 2016 study indicated that gas fluxes at Hydrate Ridge are affected more by diurnal patterns than by seasonal ones. The impacts of this require further study.

== Subsurface structure ==
In 1996, the Ocean Drilling Program deployed ocean bottom hydrophones and ocean bottom seismometers around Hydrate Ridge. The data from these tools was analyzed in a 2001 study, in which the velocities of refracted seismic waves helped scientists estimate the subsurface contents of the site (e.g. the relative thickness of its free gas zone).

== Methane venting ==
Methane is being released at Hydrate Ridge, particularly through cold seeps. The Southern Hydrate Ridge (SHR) is believed to be an especially active part of the formation. However, a 2016 study has asserted that the Summit of the SHR is not the sole structure involved in subseafloor gas and fluid transport. Smaller fluxes occur elsewhere.

The free gas zone is a zone of freed methane in a hydrate formation, beneath the hydrate stability zone. It can influence the rate of methane output at a ridge or ridge region. A large free gas zone makes more methane available to be released into the open ocean, and, thus, can likely be more influential on climate change than a smaller one.

== Biology ==
Hydrate Ridge houses several species of methane-utilizing benthic organisms, including Calyptogena clams and microbial mats. A 2001 study proposed that the microbial mats at this site correlate to heavy outflow at cold seeps. It claimed, too, that Calyptogena function with the help of sulfide-oxidizing bacteria (sulfide is a product of methane oxidation).

The aforesaid aligns with a 1986 study, which stated that several large organisms at Hydrate Ridge work symbiotically with microorganisms to produce energy from methane.

== Ocean Observatories Initiative Cabled Array ==
Part of the Ocean Observatories Initiative Cabled Array has been assembled on the Southern Hydrate Ridge. The cabled array collects and sends data on shore in real time. As a result, it enables scientists to make more, continuous observations of seasonal effects on vent activity, and of links between changes in methane flux and biochemical cycles at this specific location.
