= Jimmy Argue =

Scottish footballer

Personal information
- Full name: James Argue
- Date of birth: 26 November 1911
- Place of birth: Glasgow, Scotland
- Date of death: 11 April 1978 (aged 66)
- Place of death: Lennoxtown, Scotland
- Height: 5 ft 10 in (1.78 m)
- Position: Inside forward

Senior career*
Years	Team	Apps	(Gls)
19??–1931	St Roch's		
1931–1933	Birmingham	0	(0)
1933–1947	Chelsea	118	(30)
1947–19??	Shrewsbury Town		
- * Club domestic league appearances and goals

James Argue (26 November 1911 – 11 April 1978) was a Scottish footballer who played as an inside forward. He was born in Glasgow and began his career at junior club St Roch's before joining Birmingham in 1931, where he failed to make any appearances for the first team. He moved to Chelsea in 1933. For Chelsea he scored 35 goals from 125 matches in all competitions, 30 from 118 in the English Football League. He went on to play for Shrewsbury Town. Argue died in 1978 in Lennoxtown, Dunbartonshire.
