= Eddie Brown (cricketer) =

English cricketer

Edward Brown (27 November 1911 – 16 April 1978) was an English cricketer who played first-class cricket in 28 matches for Warwickshire between 1932 and 1934. He was born in Newcastle upon Tyne and died at Castle Bromwich, Birmingham.

Brown was a tail-end right-handed batsman and a right-arm medium-pace bowler with what Wisden Cricketers' Almanack termed "a dangerous swerve". Brought up in Darlington, he played club cricket in North East England before joining Warwickshire in the early 1930s. He made his first-class debut in mid-season in 1932 and without any spectacular success did enough to earn a further contract. In 1933, he was successful immediately he was brought into the team, taking five Worcestershire first-innings wickets for 75 runs in his first match. Better was to come just a month later: in the game against Surrey, Warwickshire led by 151 on the first innings and enforced the follow on; Brown then took eight wickets for just 35 runs to lead his team to an innings victory. Wisden described the bowling: "Maintaining an accurate length, swinging the ball, and getting plenty of pace off the pitch, he finished off the innings for 128 just before three o'clock. His performance of taking eight wickets for a trifle over four runs apiece, which helped so largely in the victory, gained him his county cap." He had another five-wicket innings in his next match, but at the end of July 1933 he was unable to bowl in the game against Sussex because of injury and he did not recover in time to play again that season.

Brown returned to the Warwickshire first team for the early matches of the 1934 season, but had very little success, taking just four wickets in four games. He left the county staff at the end of the season and did not play first-class cricket again. In 1936, back in his native North East, he played a few matches for Northumberland in the Minor Counties, playing largely as a batsman and bowling very little.
