= Mary McCarthy (police officer) =

Mary Agnes McCarthy (8 March 1903 – 3 April 1978) was an Australian police officer who was one of the first women to serve in the South Australia Police.

McCarthy was born in Sevenhill, South Australia, the seventh of ten children born to Elizabeth (née Shinnick) and Charles James McCarthy. She was educated at Catholic schools in Adelaide, attending St Dominic's Priory College and St Mary's College. She subsequently qualified as a nurse, living in Broken Hill, New South Wales, for a period and then returning to Adelaide in 1924. McCarthy joined the South Australia Police in 1929, inspired by Kate Cocks; she was its twelfth female recruit. As with the other women on the force, she was primarily tasked with handling female prisoners, suspects, and witnesses. She learned ju-jitsu and was issued with a pistol, but only rarely made arrests; she was not required to wear uniform. McCarthy retired from the police in 1960, and subsequently worked as a welfare officer for the Supreme Court of South Australia. She died in Adelaide in 1978, aged 75.
