= Reefton Spicer =

Australian rules footballer

Personal information
- Full name: Reefton Harry Adolphus Spicer
- Born: 17 July 1898; South Yarra, Victoria
- Died: 22 April 1978 (aged 79); Brighton, Victoria
- Original team: Richmond Districts

Playing career^{1}
Years	Club	Games (Goals)
1917–18	Richmond	3 (1)
- ^{1} Playing statistics correct to the end of 1918.

Reefton Harry Adolphus Spicer (17 July 1898 – 22 April 1978) was an Australian rules footballer who played with Richmond in the Victorian Football League (VFL).

== Family ==
The son of Ernest Edward Spicer (1877-1936), and Adelina Ann Elizabeth Spicer (1877-1943), née Bailhache, Reefton Harry Adolphus Spicer, known as "Harry", was born at South Yarra, Victoria on 17 July 1898.

He married Doris Annie O'Brien (1900-1974) in 1925.

== Football ==
=== Richmond (VFL) ===
Recruited from Richmond Districts, he played on the wing and in the back-pocket for the Richmond Football Club — in one senior game in 1917, and in two senior games in 1918.

=== Brunswick (VFA) ===
Cleared from Richmond, he played one senior game for the Brunswick Football Club in 1919.

=== Williamstown (VFA) ===
He played four senior games for the Williamstown Football Club in 1920.

== Death ==
He died at Brighton, Victoria on 22 April 1978.
