= Amanda E. Peele =

African/American biologist and activist

Amanda E. Peele Cheatham
- Amanda E. Peele, from a 1942 publication
- Born: January 10, 1903; Jackson, North Carolina, US
- Died: April 10, 1978 (aged 75)
- Education: Hampton Institute (BS), Cornell University (MS)
- Scientific career
- Fields: Biology, botany
- Workplaces: Hampton Institute
- Thesis: Floral anatomy of Trapa natans

Amanda Eunice Cheatham (née Peele January 10, 1903 – April 10, 1978) was an American biologist. She was the first woman of color to deliver a research paper to the Virginia Academy of Science, having done so in 1939.

== Early life and education ==
Amanda E. Peele was born on January 10, 1903, in Jackson, North Carolina. A 1923 graduate of Northampton County Training School, Peele earned a Bachelor of Science degree from Hampton Institute in 1930. After winning a fellowship from the General Education Board, she earned a Master of Science degree from Cornell University in 1934. Her thesis, entitled Floral anatomy of Trapa natans, was a study of water caltrops. At Cornell, Peele studied under Arthur Johnson Eames, William J. Hamilton, Jr., and Albert Hazen Wright.

== Academic career ==
In 1930, Peele was hired as an assistant professor at Hampton Institute, where she taught biology until her retirement in 1972. In 1941, she served as a regional director of the National Association of College Women. In 1970, she was awarded the Christian R. and Mary F. Lindback Distinguished Teaching Award by Hampton University. She was president of the National Hampton Alumni Association from 1970 to 1977. While president of the N.H.A.A., she helped hold an event for the Hampton Institute's nursing program.
