= Nambour Crushers =

Australian rugby league football club

Club information
- Full name: Nambour Crushers Rugby League Football Club
- Colours: Green; Red; Black
- Founded: 1985; 41 years ago

Current details
- Ground: Nambour
- Competition: Sunshine Coast Gympie Rugby League

Nambour Crushers Rugby League Football Club is an Australian rugby league football club based in Nambour, Queensland formed in 1985. The club was established when two Nambour local teams merged; South Magpies and the All Whites.

== Notable Juniors ==
- Souths Magpies
  - Ray Higgs (1975-78 Parramatta Eels & Manly Sea Eagles)
- Nambour Crushers
  - Ben Ross (2002-13 St George Illawarra Dragons, Penrith Panthers, Cronulla Sharks & South Sydney Rabbitohs)
  - Joe Boyce (2015- Brisbane Broncos)
