= Walter Dudley =

Australian sportsman

Personal information
- Full name: Walter John Dudley
- Born: 29 May 1918; Fitzroy, Victoria
- Died: 5 April 1978 (aged 59); Northcote, Victoria
- Batting: Right-handed
- Bowling: Right-arm fast
- Role: Bowler

Domestic team information
- Years: Team
- 1940/41: Victoria

Career statistics
Competition	First-class
Matches	4
Runs scored	29
Batting average	9.66
100s/50s	0/0
Top score	11*
Balls bowled	846
Wickets	11
Bowling average	36.54
5 wickets in innings	0
10 wickets in match	0
Best bowling	3/46
Catches/stumpings	5/–
- Source: CricketArchive, 31 December 2014

Walter John Dudley (29 May 1918 – 5 April 1978) was an Australian sportsman who played first-class cricket with Victoria and Australian rules football for Fitzroy in the Victorian Football League (VFL).

Known as 'Wal', Dudley was born in Fitzroy and played three games for their VFL side in 1940. He kicked two goals on debut against South Melbourne and a further two against Hawthorn.

In four first-class cricket matches with Victoria as a right arm fast bowler he took 11 wickets at 36.54. He twice dismissed Bill Brown in a match against Queensland but his career highlight was claiming Don Bradman for a duck, when the great Australian batsman was playing for South Australia. When not representing Victoria, Dudley played for Victorian Premier Cricket club Northcote. He made a total of 240 appearances and took a club record 556 wickets.
