= Vern Wright =

Australian rules footballer, born 1900

Personal information
- Full name: George Vernon Wright
- Born: 2 June 1900; Brunswick, Victoria
- Died: 17 April 1978 (aged 77); South Melbourne, Victoria
- Original team: Carlton District
- Height: 173 cm (5 ft 8 in)
- Weight: 69 kg (152 lb)

Playing career^{1}
| Years | Club | Games (Goals) |
| 1920, 1922 | Carlton | 5 (0) |
- ^{1} Playing statistics correct to the end of 1922.

George Vernon Wright (2 June 1900 – 17 April 1978) was an Australian rules footballer who played with Carlton in the Victorian Football League (VFL).
