= Jack Gentry (English cricketer) =

English cricketer (1899–1978)

Personal information
- Full name: Jack Sydney Bates Gentry
- Born: 4 October 1899; Wanstead, Essex, England
- Died: 16 April 1978 (aged 78); Loxwood, Sussex, England
- Batting: Right-handed
- Bowling: Slow left-arm orthodox

Domestic team information
- Years: Team
- 1919: Hampshire
- 1922–1923: Surrey
- 1925: Essex

Career statistics
Competition	First-class
Matches	12
Runs scored	68
Batting average	8.50
100s/50s	–/–
Top score	13
Balls bowled	2,563
Wickets	36
Bowling average	22.05
5 wickets in innings	–
10 wickets in match	–
Best bowling	4/36
Catches/stumpings	3/–
- Source: Cricinfo, 14 February 2010

Jack Sydney Bates Gentry CIE CBE JP (4 October 1899 – 16 April 1978) was an English first-class cricketer and an officer in the British Army.

The son of Frederick Bates, he was born at Wanstead in October 1899, but grew up in Bournemouth. He was educated at Christ's Hospital, where he represented the school cricket team. Following the completion of his education, he was commissioned into the Hampshire Regiment as a temporary second lieutenant in February 1919. He made his debut in first-class cricket in the 1919 County Championship, playing a single match for Hampshire against Essex at Bournemouth. Gentry gained employment with the Port of London Authority in the 1920s, and subsequently qualified to play for Surrey. He made eight first-class appearances for the county in 1922 and 1923, before making a final appearance in first-class cricket for Essex against Yorkshire at Leyton in the 1925 County Championship. Playing as a slow left-arm orthodox bowler, Wisden described Gentry as an extremely accurate spinner, but one who lacked the spin of greater spin bowlers. It was noted that he was more effective on hard wickets rather than softer ones. Across twelve first-class matches, he took 36 wickets at an average of 22.05, with best figures of 4 for 36.

During the Second World War, Gentry served with the Royal Engineers, having gained a commission as a captain in August 1938, with promotion to major following just weeks before the outbreak of the war. He was mentioned in despatches in both December 1940 and 1941. He was made an MBE in September 1942, in recognition of distinguished service in the Middle Eastern campaign. He spent the remainder of the conflict stationed in British India, where he held the appointment of deputy port director for the Port of Calcutta. In recognition of this role, he was made an CIE in the 1946 Birthday Honours. Following the war, Gentry was appointed general manager of The Tees Conservancy Commission, a role he held from 1946 to 1966. In recognition of his nearly–twenty years service with the commission, he was made a CBE in the 1965 Birthday Honours. He also served as a justice of the peace. Gentry died in April 1978 at Loxwood, Sussex, following a long illness.
