= Clyde Beattie =

Australian rules footballer, born 1905

Personal information
- Full name: Clyde Victor Beattie
- Born: 21 August 1905; Oatlands, Tasmania
- Died: 17 April 1978 (aged 72); Dandenong, Victoria
- Original team: North Hobart (TFL)
- Height: 174 cm (5 ft 9 in)
- Weight: 81 kg (179 lb)

Playing career^{1}
Years	Club	Games (Goals)
1930	St Kilda	5 (2)
- ^{1} Playing statistics correct to the end of 1930.

Clyde Victor Beattie (21 August 1905 – 17 April 1978) was an Australian rules footballer who played with St Kilda in the Victorian Football League (VFL).
