= Alexander G. B. Grosvenor =

U.S. Navy pilot, carrier officer, and yachtsman

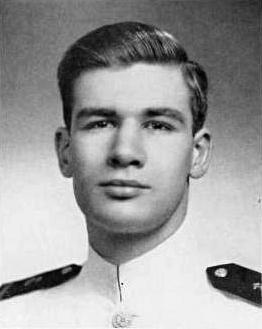
- Midshipman A.G.B. Grosvenor at graduation from the U.S. Naval Academy
- Born: December 7, 1927; Washington, D.C., U.S.
- Died: April 7, 1978 (aged 50); Annapolis, Maryland, U.S.
- Spouse: Marcia Bramen Grosvenor
- Military career
- Allegiance: United States
- Branch: United States Navy
- Service years: 1945–1978
- Rank: Captain
- Conflicts: Korean War; Vietnam War
- Other work: Naval War College

Alexander Graham Bell Grosvenor (December 7, 1927 – April 7, 1978) was a United States Navy pilot, carrier officer, and avid yachtsman credited with promoting the resurgence of sailing at the United States Naval Academy. He was a great-grandson of the inventor, Alexander Graham Bell, and brother of Gilbert M. Grosvenor, former chairman of the National Geographic Society.

== Early years ==
Grosvenor was born in 1927, the son of Helen Rowland and Melville Bell Grosvenor, who later became president of the National Geographic Society and editor of the National Geographic Magazine. In 1937, ten-year-old Alex was present when the Smithsonian Institution's secretary, Dr. Charles Abbot, opened three boxes of Bell experimental materials that had been kept locked in the Smithsonian's secret archives. In September 1942 Alex enrolled at the Taft School, where he played football and was captain of the wrestling team.

== Career ==
Grosvenor was appointed to the United States Naval Academy in 1945. In the summer of 1947, he sailed with many of his classmates on a Navy training exercise to Europe and subsequently wrote about his experiences in an article entitled "Midshipmen's Cruise" in the June 1948 issue of National Geographic, coauthored with fellow midshipman William J. Aston. Grosvenor sailed the Naval Academy's Star in the 1949 World Championships in Chicago, and “finished in the top third of the fleet, an accomplishment, which no former Navy Star had come anywhere near,” reported the Star Class Log. He earned a letter on the varsity dinghy team and was the first midshipman skipper of the yacht ROYONO in the 1950 Bermuda Race. He graduated from the Naval Academy in 1950.

Grosvenor first served aboard the Saipan-class light aircraft carrier USS Wright (CVL-49) and then served two tours in Korean waters aboard the Essex-class aircraft carriers USS Yorktown (CV-10) and USS Essex (CV-9), piloting the Navy's first swept-wing jets. Following a tour as a flight instructor, he served in the Mediterranean aboard the USS Saratoga (CV-60) as aide and flag lieutenant to Commander, Sixth Fleet.

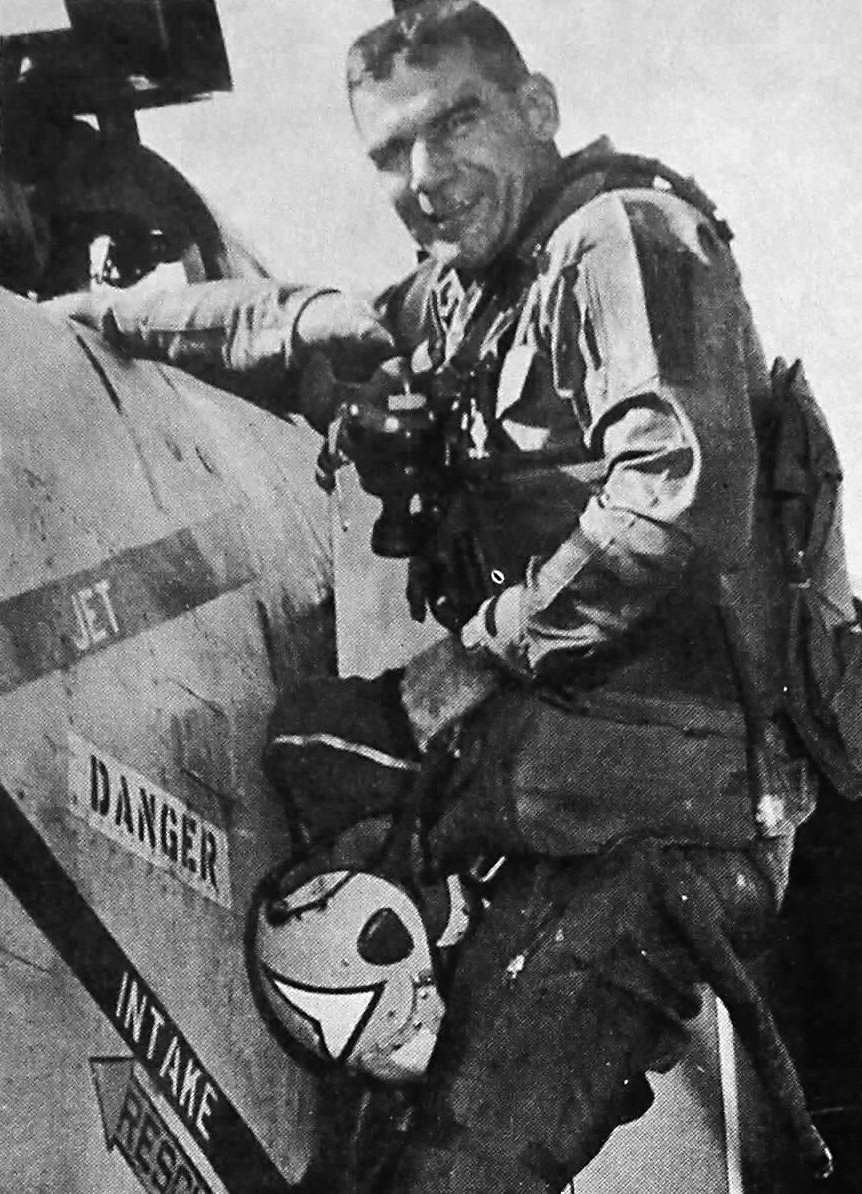
Cmdr Grosvenor, commander of Fighter Squadron VF-21 (Freelancers), climbs aboard an F4 Phantom on USS Ranger (CV-61)

Grosvenor served with Fighter Squadron 21 (VF-21) Freelancers during combat tours in southeast Asia aboard the carriers USS Coral Sea (CV-43) and USS Ranger (CV-61). An F-4B fighter jet flown by Grosvenor when he was squadron commander of the Freelancers, now known as "The Midway Phantom," is on display at the San Diego Aircraft Carrier Museum.

After graduating from the Naval War College in 1969, Grosvenor served as operations officer of the USS Kitty Hawk (CV-63), and the following year as executive officer. In the early 1970s, Grosvenor served at the Naval Air Station Patuxent River where he was "director of testing for some of the Navy's newest aircraft" according to the Annapolis Capital.

In March 1975, Grosvenor was appointed commander of the Annapolis Naval Station and commodore of the Naval Academy Sailing Squadron, where he "promoted a resurgence of sailing at the Naval Academy," according to The Washington Post.

== Awards ==
Capt. Grosvenor received a Distinguished Flying Cross, a Bronze Star, and the Navy Commendation Medal with Combat "V."

== Personal ==
Grosvenor died from a brain tumor in 1978, and his wife Marcia died in 2002.

== Legacy ==
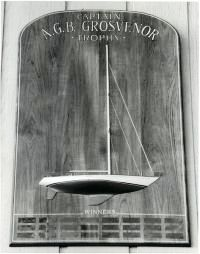
The A.G.B. Grosvenor Trophy

The A.G.B. Grosvenor Trophy is awarded annually to the volunteer member of the Naval Academy Sailing Squadron who has made exemplary contributions to the mission and programs of the sailing squadron. It was established in 1978 to honor Grosvenor, who had been commanding officer of Naval Station Annapolis, and commodore of the Naval Academy Sailing Squadron.

== Gallery ==
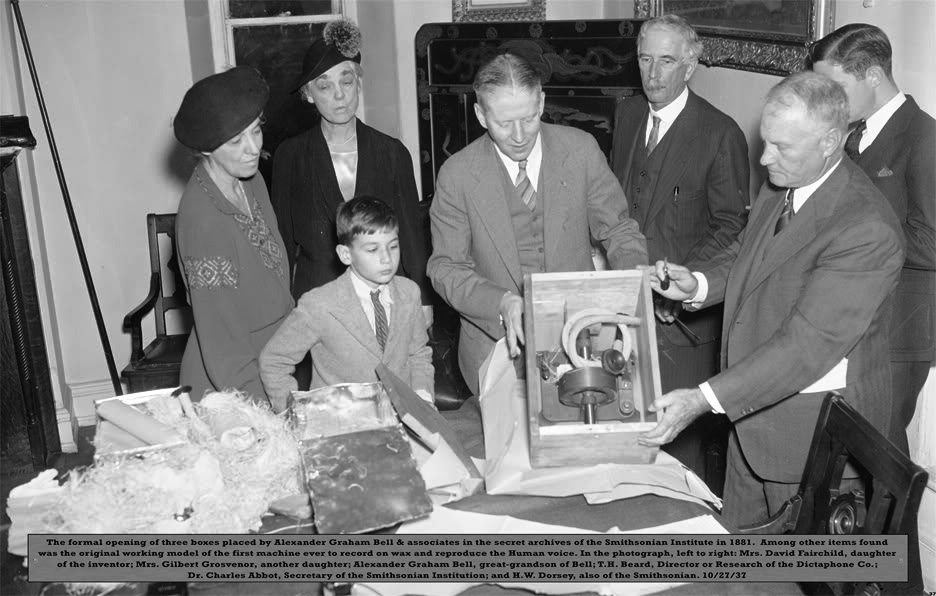
In 1937, ten-year-old Alex Grosvenor watches as Smithsonian Secretary Dr. Charles Abbot opens three boxes of experimental materials that his great-grandfather, Alexander Graham Bell, had deposited in the institution's secret archives.

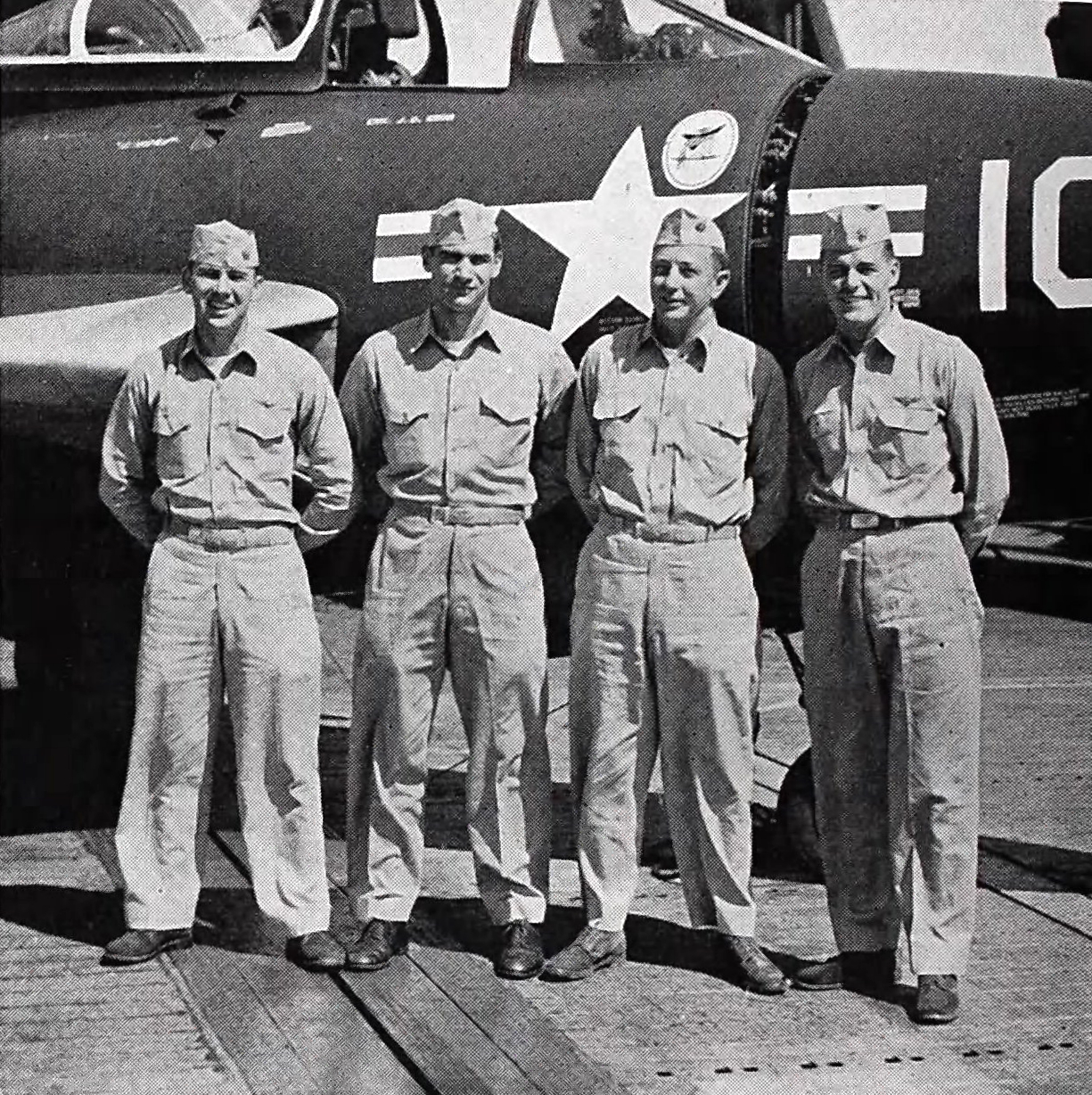
Four Naval aviators on board the USS Essex in 1955 include LTJG Grosvenor (second from left). From the 1955 Cruise Book of the Essex, page 156.

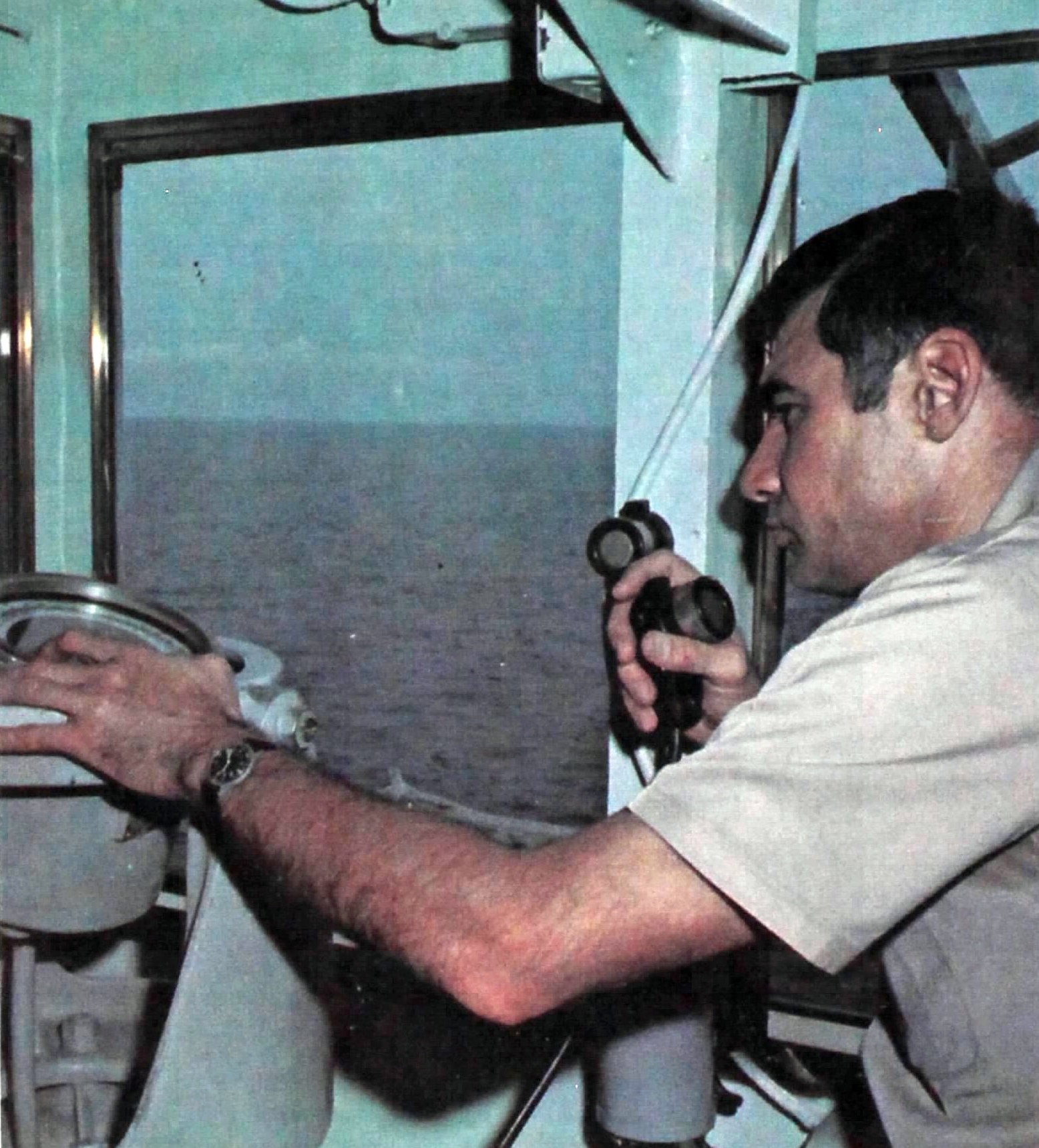
Photographs of Captain A.G.B. Grosvenor, executive officer of the USS Kitty Hawk (CV-63) from its Western Pacific Cruise Yearbook of 1970–1971, page 12.
