= Jesse Roy Christie =

- Born: 1889; New Boston
- Died: 21 April 1978 (aged 88–89)
- Alma mater: University of Kentucky; University of Illinois system; George Washington University; University of New Hampshire
- Occupation: Nematologist
- Employer: Food and Agriculture Organization; United States Department of Agriculture; University of Florida

Jesse Roy Christie (1889 – 21 April 1978) was an American nematologist and plant pathologist.

== Career ==
In 1922, shortly after leaving the army, Jesse Christie joined the group of N. A. Cobb at the Office of Nematology in Washington D.C., part of the U.S. Department of Agriculture. Between 1923 and 1937 he published 19 papers on the nematode parasites of insects, as well as contributed to a 129-page chapter in Benjamin Goodwin Chitwood's Introduction to Nematology. While working at Woods Hole with N. A. Cobb, he also discovered the life cycle of the nematode parasite on grasshoppers Mermis subnigrescens.

Between 1927 and 1930, Christie joined the Helminthological Society of Washington as a secretary, and was appointed president in 1930. After N.A. Cobb's death in 1932, Christie had to abandon his project on insect parasites and moved to Washington, D.C. Between 1932 and 1947 he served as an editor of "Proceedings of the Helminthological Society of Washington", and in 1956 was elected as a life member. In 1964, Christie received an anniversary award from the Helminthological Society of Washington.

In 1940, Christie moved to Beltsville, Maryland, and began working on plant parasitic nematodes. As part of the war effort. he evaluated chemicals for nematode control. Through this line of work he identified ethylene dibromide as a compound subsequently widely used for nematode control. His extensive work on plant parasites led to the publication of 75 papers, as well as the book Plant Nematodes Their Bionomics And Control (1959).

In 1948, Christie moved to Sanford, Florida, where he worked together with V. G. Perry on stubby-root and sting nematode parasites on plants. He continued working on plant parasitic nematodes for the rest of his career.

In 1953, Christie retired as a Senior Nematologist from the USDA, and left for Indonesia to study the nematodes in the Spice Islands. His research there focused on burrowing nematodes on pepper and the rice root nematode Hirschmanniella oryzae. He published his discoveries at the Spice Islands in a nine-part series in Nematology Newsletter, titled Hunting Nematodes in The Spice Islands.

Following his trip to Indonesia, Christie joined the University of Florida in 1954, where he founded the Nematology Department and engaged in teaching as well as research and applications. He retired from this position in 1960.

== Awards and acknowledgements ==
- Charter member of the American Society of Parasitologists
- Fellow in the American Phytopathological Society (1972)
- Honorary member of the Society of Nematologists, Soil & Crop Science Society of Florida
- Honorary member of the Florida Nematology Forum
- Florida Fruit and Vegetable Association Research Award (1957)
- Sigma Delta Faculty award (1961)
