= Lewis Teague (painter) =

American painter and architect

- Born: Rudolph Lewis Teague; November 30, 1917; Queens, New York, U.S.
- Died: April 14, 1978 (aged 60); Fayston, Vermont, U.S.
- Known for: Painting
- Movement: Abstract expressionism
- Spouse(s): Mary Abbott (1943–1950, divorce), Virginia Vanderbilt (1950–1978, death)

Rudolph Lewis Teague (November 30, 1917, in Jamaica, New York – April 14, 1978 Fayston, Vermont) was an American painter from the Second Generation New York School.

== Biography ==
Rudolph Lewis Teague was born November 30, 1917, in Jamaica, Queens, New York City, to Cecilia Fehon Teague and Walter Dorwin Teague, their youngest son. He attended P.S. 1 (now known as P.S. 001 Alfred E. Smith) elementary school, then Gow School for Dyslexia and Learning Disabilities (now known as the Gow School) boarding school in Upstate New York as ordered by his father to correct his left-handedness.

Teague married fellow Art Student's League painter, Mary Lee Abbott in 1943, while home on leave from the United States Army, where he served as a gunnery sergeant at a range in New Mexico. Teague left the Army in 1945 at the end of the war, and he and Abbott separated in 1946.

Teague attended Pratt Institute briefly to study architecture but, while in New Mexico on a painting excursion near Taos, instructor Tom Benrimo told the architecture student that he had a "painters eye", and perhaps he should focus on painting, instead. Teague took Benrimo's advice, and returned to the Art Students League of New York, where he met and fell in love with Virginia Vanderbilt, a graduate of U of W and of Seattle, WA. At the Art Students League of New York he found Morris Kantor as a mentor and teacher, and admired Barnet Newman. He rented Arshile Gorky's studio after the artist died in 1948. DeKooning and Rothko were part of the crowd, and later Teague would visit them in the Hamptons with his new wife, Virginia, and daughters Allison and Cecelia.

In 1948, Teague contracted polio affecting his thigh and stomach muscles, as well as losing the use of his left arm, his painting hand. Following a long recovery from which he was not expected to survive let alone learn to walk again, he and Mary Abbott finalized their divorced early in 1950, and he and Virginia Vanderbilt were married in May 1950. Learning to walk following the serious bout with polio, Teague and his wife left New York City and moved to Norwich, Vermont, in 1954. Together they raised four children, Allison, Cecelia, John and Joshua, in Vermont. Teague relearned to paint and draw again in his studio in Norwich, this time using his right hand.

In 1959, Teague was photographed by Hanson Carroll for Life magazine.

He delivered a body of work that was shown at the New York World's Fair in the Gas Pavilion restaurant in 1960, at the Port Authority in 1964, and through the Bermuda Society of Arts in Bermuda, with Henry Moore in 1965.

== Death and legacy ==
Teague died in 1978.

Numerous shows in Vermont and New York City punctuated his career - however he had a reclusive lifestyle and did not show his work as much as other artists. A show was held posthumously in 1983 at the Unicorn Gallery in Aspen, Colorado, examples from several hundred paintings, and over 500 drawings left as his legacy. The exhibition was purchased by a single Texas collector. It is unknown what happened to these, some 22, paintings which include some of Teague's most definitive pieces of abstract expressionist and color field paintings. Teague leaves a remaining legacy of paintings and drawings that have essentially not seen the light of day since his death.
