= Paul Lerme =

French cyclist

Personal information
- Born: 13 March 1902
- Died: 23 April 1978 (aged 76)

Cycling career
- Sport: Cycling
- Discipline: Road
- Role: Rider

Paul Lerme (13 March 1902 – 23 April 1978) was a French racing cyclist. He rode in the 1928 Tour de France.
