= Ernest Parkinson =

English cricketer

Ernest William Parkinson (28 April 1894 – 14 April 1978) was an English cricketer active in 1920 who played for Leicestershire. He was born in Sileby and died in Leicester. He appeared in two first-class matches as a righthanded batsman who scored 26 runs with a highest score of 18.
