= Doug Rayment =

Australian rules footballer, born 1910

Personal information
- Full name: Douglas Herbert Rayment
- Born: 13 December 1910; Carlton, Victoria
- Died: 23 April 1978 (aged 67); Parkville, Victoria
- Original team: Sandringham
- Height: 165 cm (5 ft 5 in)
- Weight: 76 kg (168 lb)
- Position: Wing

Playing career^{1}
| Years | Club | Games (Goals) |
| 1934–40 | St Kilda | 100 (35) |
- ^{1} Playing statistics correct to the end of 1940.

Douglas Herbert Rayment (13 December 1910 – 23 April 1978) was an Australian rules footballer who played with St Kilda in the Victorian Football League (VFL). He also played for Victorian Football Association club Prahran, crossing without a clearance in 1941 during the throw-pass era.

Rayment later served in the Royal Australian Air Force during World War II.
