= Irene Dillard Elliott =

Irene Dillard Elliott (August 7, 1892 – April 5, 1978) was the first woman to graduate with a Ph.D. from the University of North Carolina, the first woman to be a full professor at the University of South Carolina, and the first female dean at USC.

== Personal life and education ==
Elliott was born on August 7, 1892, in Laurens County, SC. She was the youngest of 10 children James Park Dillard and Elizabeth Irene Byrd.

Elliot treceived her early education in Laurens County public schools. She then attended Presbyterian College and George Peabody College. She received her Bachelor's degree in 1912 from Randolph-Macon Women's College.

Elliott pursued a career in education for several years before attending the University of South Carolina in Columbia to earn her master's degree. She received her M.A. degree in 1921. In 1923, she began her doctoral studies at the University of North Carolina(UNC) in English. She graduated in 1924, the first woman to graduate from UNC with a Ph.D. She eventually published her dissertation in 1950 as A History of Literature in South Carolina.

She married Charles Bell Elliot, a member of the USC Law School faculty.

Elliott died on April 5, 1978 in Columbia. She is buried in the First Presbyterian Churchyard.

== Career ==
After graduating with her bachelor's, Elliott worked as a principal at a high school in Cross Hill. Following this, Elliott returned to Randolph-Macon to work in the English department. She continued to work here for 7 years before assuming principalship at a small grammar school in Columbia, where she worked while earning her M.A. at USC.

After graduating with a Ph.D. in the spring of 1924, Elliott accepted a job working as the first dean of women at USC, which had just become completely coeducational. Along with being a dean, she worked as a full-time English professor. During this time, she strived to smooth over the transition USC took to become coeducational.

During her time as dean at USC, Elliott became increasingly involved in many civic, educational, and cultural movements and organizations. These organizations included Phi Beta Kappa, Daughters of the American Revolution (DAR), and the American Association of University Women. Elliott established a DAR chapter at USC. She also served as the South Carolina State organizing secretary while simultaneously working with the Descendants of Revolutionary War Heroes.

She was forced to retire in 1935 due to poor health and illness. After World War II resulted in veterans filling colleges and universities, Elliott returned to teaching at USC in 1946. She taught as an associate professor at USC until 1964.

Elliott became active in organizing Great Books courses. It was during this time that Elliott became involved in genealogical studies, which deepened her interest in Laurens County. Following this, she became co-editor of South Carolina's Distinguished Women of Laurens County, which was published in 1972 after her final retirement.

After her retirement, in honor of her teaching skills, USC awards the Irene D. Elliott Award for Outstanding Teaching annually.
