= Sophia Lyon Fahs =

American writer (1876–1978)

Sophia Blanche Lyon Fahs
- Born: Sophia Blanche Lyon; August 2, 1876. China
- Died: April 14, 1978 (aged 101)
- Other names: Sophia Lyon Fahs
- Occupations: Teacher, Editor, Author, Minister of Religious Education
- Known for: Writing, Religious Education
- Relatives: Hubert Park Beck (son-in-law)

Sophia Blanche Lyon Fahs (August 2, 1876 – April 14, 1978) was an editor, author, teacher, and religious activist who led a revolution in Unitarian religious education. Fahs' teaching and writing focused on a method of experiential learning that she hoped would enable children to develop their own ideas about religion and spirituality.

== Early life ==
Sophia Lyons Fahs was born on August 2, 1876, in China, to Presbyterian missionaries to China. Her father, David Nelson Lyon, and mother, Mandana Doolittle Lyon, moved with her to Wooster, OH when she was three and a half years old. Her upbringing was strictly evangelical and ritualistic, as she herself describes:

We had family prayers and Bible reading every day. Each of us took our turn until we went right through the Bible. Sunday was a very carefully observed day, spent mostly going to church, reading religious books, playing Bible games and singing. I had been a faithful Sunday School pupil all through childhood. The religion of the home was serious, devout, sturdy, and sincere.

Fahs received her B.A. from The College of Wooster (then called The University of Wooster) in 1897, as well as an honorary degree in 1961. She received her M.A. from the Teachers College of Columbia University (1904) and her B.D. from Union Theological Seminary (1926). She commented on her education, saying:

I decided I must have a theological education. I wanted to have the same education ministers have, because I want to understand the things that they understood.

While studying elementary education, Sophia Lyon married Charles "Harvey" Fahs in June 1902. She had five children, three of whom survived.

== Career ==
Fahs was more than just a Sunday school teacher at Riverside Church. For three years, she served as principal of the Union School of Religion upon receiving her Bachelor of Divinity degree. She held this position from 1926 to 1929, when the building closed. From 1927 to 1944, she also served as one of the first female faculty members at Union Theological Seminary as instructor in Religious Education.

After Fahs left Union in 1944, she became editor of Parents Magazine. In 1945 she joined a Unitarian congregation, and in 1959 she became the first female professor to be ordained as a Unitarian minister. She was ordained by the Cedar Lane Unitarian Church of Bethesda, Maryland (Unitarians and Universalists consolidated in 1961 to form the Unitarian Universalist Association). Beginning in 1937 and continuing until her retirement in 1964, Fahs worked for the American Unitarian Association as an editor of children's materials for a new religious curriculum called "The New Beacon Series." One of her best-known quotes is "Each night a child is born is a holy night."

Fahs authored or co-authored more than 40 books and even more articles. She retired at the age of eighty-eight and died at the age of 101, leaving behind a legacy of religious and educational progressivism.

When the Rev. Dr. Randolph Becker started a Unitarian-Universalist children's sleep away camp (for children up to grade 12), he adopted Sophia Fahs's name for the camp since her religious education was always centered on immediate experience. The Sophia Fahs RE Camp has run each August on Shelter Island, NY, since 1981.

The Liberal Religious Educators Association, the professional organization of Unitarian Universalist Association religious educators, sponsors the annual Sophia Lyon Fahs lecture at the UUA's annual General Assembly.

== Books ==
- Uganda's White Man of Work: A Story of Alexander M. Mackay (1907)
- Red, Yellow, and Black (1918)
- Exploring Religion with Eight Year Olds, with Helen Firman Sweet (1930)
- Beginnings of Earth and Sky: Stories Old and New (1937)
- Beginnings of Life and Death: Stories Old and New, with Dorothy T. Spoerl (1938)
- Martin and Judy in Sunshine and Rain, with Verna Hills (1940)
- Leading Children in Worship (1943)
- When is a Person Religious? (1944)
- A New Ministry to Children (1945)
- Jesus, the Carpenter's Son (1945)
- The Church Across the Street (1947)
- From Long Ago and Many Lands (1948)
- Consider the Children How They Grow (1951)
- Today's Children and Yesterday's Heritage: A Philosophy of Creative Religious Development (1952)
- From Long Ago and Many Lands (1955)
- The Old Story of Salvation (1955)
- Developing Concepts of God with Children (1959)
- Beginnings: Earth, Sky, Life, Death, Revised Edition (1960)
- Worshipping Together with Questioning Minds (1965)
- Old Tales for a New Day: Early Answers to Life's Eternal Questions, with Alice Cobb and Gobin Stair (1980)
