= Thomas Trembath =

Australian cricketer

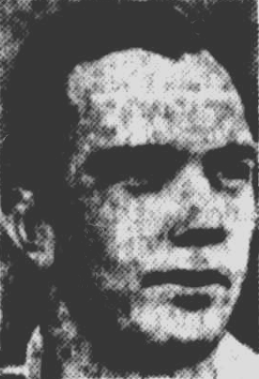

Personal information
- Born: 16 January 1912; Moonta, South Australia, Australia
- Died: 2 April 1978 (aged 66); West Brunswick, Victoria, Australia

Domestic team information
- Years: Team
- 1933-1934: Victoria
- Source: Cricinfo, 22 November 2015

Thomas Trembath (16 January 1912 – 2 April 1978) was an Australian cricketer. He played three first-class cricket matches for Victoria between 1933 and 1934.

== See also ==
- List of Victoria first-class cricketers
