= Bill Brunier =

Australian rules footballer

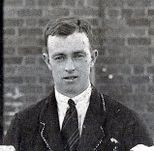

Personal information
- Full name: William Davies Trembath Brunier
- Born: 28 April 1889; Carlton, Victoria
- Died: 3 July 1956 (aged 67); Brighton, Victoria
- Original team: Elsternwick / Collegians
- Height: 171 cm (5 ft 7 in)
- Weight: 57 kg (126 lb)

Playing career^{1}
Years	Club	Games (Goals)
1914–15, 1919	Melbourne	9 (8)
- ^{1} Playing statistics correct to the end of 1919.

William Davies Trembath Brunier (28 April 1889 – 3 July 1956) was an Australian rules football player who served in the Australian Imperial Force during World War I.

== Football career ==
Brunier made his debut for Melbourne in the Victorian Football League in Round 15 of the 1914 VFL season, finishing the season having played three matches. He returned for the 1915 season and played two matches. After a break due to military service he rejoined Melbourne in 1919, playing four matches. He finished his VFL career having played nine matches, scoring eight goals.

== Cricket career ==
In 1911 Brunier made the first of 19 first grade appearances for St Kilda and Melbourne in Victorian grade cricket.

== Military service ==
Brunier enlisted with the Army in June 1917 and left for the War in November 1917 on the HMAT Nestor. He returned to Australia in January 1919.
