= Kojin Kozu =

Japanese painter

- Born: 21 December 1889; Kitasaku District, Japan
- Died: 7 April 1978 (aged 88); Tokyo, Japan
- Occupation: Painter

Kojin Kozu (神津 港人, Kōzu Kōjin; 21 December 1889 – 7 April 1978) was a Japanese painter. His work was part of the painting event in the art competition at the 1932 Summer Olympics.
