= 2016 Newcastle Knights season =

- NRL Rank: 16th (last)
- 2016 record: Wins: 1; draws: 1; losses: 22
- Points scored: For: 305; against: 800

Team information
- CEO: Matthew Gidley
- Coach: Nathan Brown
- Captain: Trent Hodkinson, Tariq Sims & Jeremy Smith
- Stadium: Hunter Stadium
- Avg. attendance: 14,457
- High attendance: 21,653

Top scorers
- Tries: Nathan Ross (9)
- Goals: Trent Hodkinson (47)
- Points: Trent Hodkinson (99)
← 2015	2017 →

The 2016 Newcastle Knights season was the 29th in the club's history. Coached by Nathan Brown and co-captained by Trent Hodkinson, Tariq Sims and Jeremy Smith, they competed in the NRL's 2016 Telstra Premiership, finishing the regular season in 16th place (out of 16). In the pre-season the Knights competed in the 2016 Auckland Nines tournament, reaching the quarter-finals. Mid-way through the 2016 season the team had only one member selected to play in the 2016 State of Origin series. Notably, all four Mata'utia brothers, Chanel, Pat, Peter and Sione featured in the NRL team for the Knights throughout the year.

== Milestones ==
- Round 1: David Bhana made his NRL debut for the club.
- Round 1: Jaelen Feeney made his NRL debut for the club.
- Round 1: Trent Hodkinson made his debut for the club, after previously playing for the Canterbury-Bankstown Bulldogs, captained his 1st game for the club and kicked his 1st goal for the club.
- Round 1: Pat Mata'utia made his NRL debut for the club and scored his 1st career try.
- Round 1: Pauli Pauli made his debut for the club, after previously playing for the Parramatta Eels.
- Round 1: Daniel Saifiti made his NRL debut for the club and scored his 1st career try.
- Round 1: Jacob Saifiti made his NRL debut for the club.
- Round 1: Jeremy Smith captained his 1st game for the club.
- Round 3: Cory Denniss made his NRL debut for the club and scored his 1st career try.
- Round 3: Sam Mataora scored his 1st try for the club.
- Round 3: Jarrod Mullen played his 200th game for the club, which was also his 200th career game.
- Round 3: Mickey Paea made his debut for the club, after previously playing for Hull FC.
- Round 5: Jacob Saifiti scored his 1st career try.
- Round 6: The Knights won their 200th game at Hunter Stadium.
- Round 6: Will Pearsall made his NRL debut for the club.
- Round 6: Tariq Sims captained his 1st game for the club.
- Round 7: Josh King made his NRL debut for the club.
- Round 7: Jack Stockwell played his 50th career game.
- Round 8: Sam Mataora played his 50th career game.
- Round 8: Jeremy Smith played his 200th career game.
- Round 9: Brock Lamb made his NRL debut for the club.
- Round 10: Jack Cogger made his NRL debut for the club.
- Round 11: Dane Gagai played his 100th career game.
- Round 11: Trent Hodkinson scored his 1st try for the club.
- Round 12: Pauli Pauli scored his 1st try for the club.
- Round 13: Lachlan Fitzgibbon scored his 1st career try.
- Round 14: Mitchell Barnett made his debut for the club, after previously playing for the Canberra Raiders.
- Round 14: Brendan Elliot made his debut for the club, after previously playing for the Sydney Roosters, and scored his 1st try for the club.
- Round 16: Mitchell Barnett scored his 1st career try.
- Round 16: Trent Hodkinson scored his 500th career point.
- Round 17: Trent Hodkinson kicked his 1st field goal for the club.
- Round 21: David Bhana scored his 1st career try.
- Round 21: Dane Gagai played his 100th game for the club.
- Round 22: The Knights lost their 14th game in a row, breaking their 2005 season record of 13 losses in a row.
- Round 24: Peter Mata'utia played his 50th career game.
- Round 25: Dylan Phythian made his NRL debut for the club and scored his 1st career try.
- Round 25: Jeremy Smith kicked his 1st goal for the club.

== Squad ==
Newcastle Knights
2016 NRL premiership squad				Coaching staff
158 Todd Lowrie – LK (pre-season retirement); 172 Kade Snowden – PR (mid-season retirement); 179 Jarrod Mullen – FE, HK; 209 Akuila Uate – WG; 226 Peter Mata'utia – CE, WG, FB, FE; 234 Chris Adams – HK (mid-season loss); 235 Dane Gagai – FB, CE, WG; 237 Robbie Rochow – SR, PR, LK, CE; 239 Jeremy Smith (c) – LK (gk); 242 Korbin Sims – PR, SR, LK; 249 Jake Mamo – FB, WG; 250 Joseph Tapine – SR (pre-season loss); 252 Chanel Mata'utia – WG	253 Sione Mata'utia – CE, SR, FE; 254 Tyler Randell – HK, LK, CE, FE; 255 Jack Stockwell – PR, LK; 256 Tariq Sims (c) – SR, CE (mid-season loss); 258 Sam Mataora – PR; 260 Danny Levi – HK, LK, FE; 261 Lachlan Fitzgibbon – SR, CE, PR; 262 Nathan Ross – WG, CE; 263 David Bhana – LK, HK, PR, SR; 264 Jaelen Feeney – FB, FE, CE, HK; 265 Trent Hodkinson (c) – HB (gk); 266 Pat Mata'utia – CE, WG, LK; 267 Pauli Pauli – SR, PR	268 Daniel Saifiti – PR; 269 Jacob Saifiti – SR, LK, CE, PR; 270 Cory Denniss – WG, CE; 271 Mickey Paea – PR; 272 Will Pearsall – HK, FE; 273 Josh King – PR; 274 Brock Lamb – FE; 275 Jack Cogger – FE, HB; 276 Mitchell Barnett – SR, LK; 277 Brendan Elliot – WG, CE; 278 Dylan Phythian – HK, FB; 000 Bryce Donovan – FB; 000 Krys Freeman – HK	000 Tama Koopu – PR; 000 Bradie Smith – SR; 000 James Taylor – PR (mid-season loss); 000 Tekina Vailea – SR; 000 Luke Yates – LK; Extended squad players: Uiti Baker – PR; Braden Robson – LK; Ken Tofilau – WG	Head coach: Nathan Brown; Assistant coaches: Danny Buderus; Michael Potter; Matt Lantry - ISP NSW coach; Todd Lowrie - NYC coach; Legend: (c) Captain(s); (vc) Vice-captain(s); Updated: 31 December 2016; Source(s): Newcastle Knights Profiles, Rugby League Project

== Transfers and Re-signings ==
=== Gains ===
Player	Previous club	Length
Chris Adams	Lakes United	2016
Uiti Baker	Manly Warringah Sea Eagles	2016
Mitchell Barnett	Canberra Raiders	2017
David Bhana	New Zealand Warriors	2017
Nathan Brown (head coach)	Melbourne Storm	2018
Brendan Elliot	Sydney Roosters	2017
Krys Freeman	Norths Devils	2016
Trent Hodkinson	Canterbury-Bankstown Bulldogs	2018
Todd Lowrie (NYC coach)	Brisbane Broncos	2016
Peter Mata'utia	St. George Illawarra Dragons	2017
Mickey Paea	Hull F.C.	2017
Pauli Pauli	Parramatta Eels	2017
Will Pearsall	Manly Warringah Sea Eagles	2017
Michael Potter (assistant coach)	Fiji under-20s team	2016
Tekina Vailea	Illawarra Cutters	2016

=== Losses ===
Player	Club
Adam Clydsdale	Canberra Raiders
David Fa'alogo	Ipswich Jets
Marvin Filipo	Cessnock Goannas
Jake Finn	Western Suburbs Rosellas
Kurt Gidley	Warrington Wolves
Kerrod Holland	Canterbury-Bankstown Bulldogs
Chris Houston	Widnes Vikings
Sam Keenan	Western Suburbs Rosellas
Joseph Leilua	Canberra Raiders
James McManus	Retirement
Clint Newton	Retirement
Jah Pakau	Released
Pride Petterson-Robati	Casey Warriors
Chad Redman	Gold Coast Titans
Tyrone Roberts	Gold Coast Titans
Craig Sandercock (assistant coach)	Wests Tigers
Beau Scott	Parramatta Eels
Damian Sironen	Illawarra Cutters
Rick Stone (head coach)	Contract terminated
Tuiala Togiatasi	Tweed Heads Seagulls
Honeti Tuha	Parramatta Eels
Carlos Tuimavave	Hull F.C.
Noel Underwood	Townsville Blackhawks
Paterika Vaivai	Burleigh Bears

=== Promoted juniors ===
Player	Junior side
Cory Denniss	Knights National Youth Competition
Tama Koopu	Knights New South Wales Cup
Braden Robson	Knights National Youth Competition
Daniel Saifiti	Knights National Youth Competition
Jacob Saifiti	Knights National Youth Competition
Bradie Smith	Knights National Youth Competition
Ken Tofilau	Knights National Youth Competition

=== Change of role ===
Player/Coach	New role
Danny Buderus (interim head coach)	Knights assistant coach
James Elias	Knights second-tier squad
Jacob Gagai	Knights second-tier squad
Troy Pezet (NYC coach)	Knights Elite Pathways Recruitment Manager
Michael Steele	Knights second-tier squad

=== Re-signings ===
Player/Coach	Re-signed to
Josh King	2018
Brock Lamb	2018
Dylan Phythian	2017
Nathan Ross	2018
Daniel Saifiti	2018
Jacob Saifiti	2018

=== Player contract situations ===
2016 (left)	2017	2018
Chris Adams	Mitchell Barnett	Jack Cogger
Uiti Baker	David Bhana	Trent Hodkinson
Bryce Donovan	Cory Denniss	Josh King
Krys Freeman	Brendan Elliot	Brock Lamb
Tama Koopu	Jaelen Feeney	Danny Levi
Todd Lowrie	Lachlan Fitzgibbon	Chanel Mata'utia
Robbie Rochow	Dane Gagai	Pat Mata'utia
Tariq Sims	Jake Mamo	Sione Mata'utia
Jeremy Smith	Sam Mataora	Jarrod Mullen
Kade Snowden	Peter Mata'utia	Nathan Ross
Joseph Tapine	Mickey Paea	Daniel Saifiti
James Taylor	Pauli Pauli	Jacob Saifiti
Ken Tofilau	Will Pearsall	
Akuila Uate	Dylan Phythian	
Tekina Vailea	Tyler Randell	
	Braden Robson	
	Korbin Sims	
	Bradie Smith	
	Jack Stockwell	
	Luke Yates	

== Ladder ==
2016 NRL season
Pos	Team	Pld	W	D	L	B	PF	PA	PD	Pts
1	Melbourne Storm	24	19	0	5	2	563	302	+261	42
2	Canberra Raiders	24	17	1	6	2	688	456	+232	39
3	Cronulla-Sutherland Sharks (P)	24	17	1	6	2	580	404	+176	39
4	North Queensland Cowboys	24	15	0	9	2	584	355	+229	34
5	Brisbane Broncos	24	15	0	9	2	554	434	+120	34
6	Penrith Panthers	24	14	0	10	2	563	463	+100	32
7	Canterbury-Bankstown Bulldogs	24	14	0	10	2	506	448	+58	32
8	Gold Coast Titans	24	11	1	12	2	508	497	+11	27
9	Wests Tigers	24	11	0	13	2	499	607	−108	26
10	New Zealand Warriors	24	10	0	14	2	513	601	−88	24
11	St. George Illawarra Dragons	24	10	0	14	2	341	538	−197	24
12	South Sydney Rabbitohs	24	9	0	15	2	473	549	−76	22
13	Manly-Warringah Sea Eagles	24	8	0	16	2	454	563	−109	20
14	Parramatta Eels	24	13	0	11	2	298	324	−26	18^{1}
15	Sydney Roosters	24	6	0	18	2	443	576	−133	16
16	Newcastle Knights	24	1	1	22	2	305	800	−495	7

^{1} Parramatta were deducted 12 competition points and their for/against tally accumulated between rounds 1-9 for gross long-term salary cap breaches.

== Jerseys and sponsors ==
In 2016, the Knights' jerseys were made by ISC and their major sponsor was Newpave Asphalt.

2016 Home Jersey	2016 Away Jersey	2016 ANZAC Jersey	2016 NSW Mining Jersey

== Fixtures ==
=== Auckland Nines ===
Squad: 1. Jake Mamo 2. Nathan Ross 3. Jaelen Feeney 4. Akuila Uate 6. Brock Lamb 7. Will Pearsall 8. Pauli Pauli 9. Tyler Randell (c) 10. Daniel Saifiti 11. Korbin Sims 12. Robbie Rochow (c) 13. Jacob Saifiti 14. Sione Mata'utia 15. Joseph Tapine 16. Tariq Sims (c) 17. Chanel Mata'utia 18. Danny Levi 19. Pat Mata'utia

Date	Round	Opponent	Venue	Score	Tries	Drop Goal Conversions	Attendance
Saturday, 6 February	Auckland Nines Game 3	North Queensland Cowboys	Eden Park	12-28	B.Lamb, D.Levi	B.Lamb (2/2)	
Saturday, 6 February	Auckland Nines Game 11	Penrith Panthers	Eden Park	15-14	J.Mamo (2), C.Mata'utia	D.Levi (1/3)	
Sunday, 7 February	Auckland Nines Game 19	Wests Tigers	Eden Park	21-16	D.Levi, R.Rochow, A.Uate, J.Mamo	B.Lamb (2/4)	
Sunday, 7 February	Auckland Nines Quarter-Final 1	Parramatta Eels	Eden Park	8-12	J.Mamo, J.Feeney	B.Lamb (0/2)	
Legend: Win Loss Draw

=== Pre-season trials ===
Date	Round	Opponent	Venue	Score	Tries	Goals	Attendance
Saturday, 20 February	Trial 1	Canberra Raiders	Wade Park	28 – 34	J.Feeney, L.Fitzgibbon, A.Uate, C.Mata'utia, B.Lamb	T.Hodkinson (3/3), T.Randell (0/1), B.Lamb (1/1)	
Legend: Win Loss Draw

=== Regular season ===
- FG – Field Goal
- GP – Golden Point extra time

Date	Round	Opponent	Venue	Result	Score	Tries	Goals/Field Goals	Attendance
3 March	1	Gold Coast Titans	Cbus Super Stadium, Robina	Lost	12-30	Pat Mata'utia, Daniel Saifiti	Trent Hodkinson (2/2)	8,313
12 March	2	South Sydney Rabbitohs	ANZ Stadium, Sydney	Lost	6-48	Nathan Ross	Trent Hodkinson (1/1)	13,364
19 March	3	Canberra Raiders	Hunter Stadium, Newcastle	Draw	24-24 (GP)	Cory Denniss 2, Pat Mata'utia, Sam Mataora	Trent Hodkinson (4/4)	13,745
28 March	4	New Zealand Warriors	Mt. Smart Stadium, Auckland	Lost	18-40	Sam Mataora, Dane Gagai, Nathan Ross	Trent Hodkinson (3/3)	13,895
2 April	5	Melbourne Storm	AAMI Park, Melbourne	Lost	14-18	Jacob Saifiti, Korbin Sims	Trent Hodkinson (3/3)	11,443
10 April	6	Wests Tigers	Hunter Stadium, Newcastle	Won	18-16	Akuila Uate, Korbin Sims, Nathan Ross	Trent Hodkinson (3/3)	21,653
16 April	7	Brisbane Broncos	Suncorp Stadium, Brisbane	Lost	0-53			30,394
25 April	8	Manly-Warringah Sea Eagles	Hunter Stadium, Newcastle	Lost	10-26	Tyler Randell, Nathan Ross	Trent Hodkinson (1/2)	19,072
30 April	9	Sydney Roosters	Allianz Stadium, Sydney	Lost	0-38			9,502
15 May	10	Cronulla-Sutherland Sharks	Hunter Stadium, Newcastle	Lost	0-62			16,150
21 May	11	Wests Tigers	Campbelltown Stadium, Campbelltown	Lost	12-20	Trent Hodkinson, Dane Gagai	Trent Hodkinson (2/2)	8,658
30 May	12	Parramatta Eels	Hunter Stadium, Newcastle	Lost	18-20	Sione Mata'utia, Pauli Pauli, Nathan Ross	Trent Hodkinson (3/5)	12,856
4 June	13	North Queensland Cowboys	1300SMILES Stadium, Townsville	Lost	16-46	Cory Denniss, Jake Mamo, Lachlan Fitzgibbon	Trent Hodkinson (2/3)	14,651
11 June	14	New Zealand Warriors	Hunter Stadium, Newcastle	Lost	14-50	Sione Mata'utia, Brendan Elliot	Trent Hodkinson (3/3)	12,222
16-20 June	15	Bye						
25 June	16	St. George Illawarra Dragons	Hunter Stadium, Newcastle	Lost	18-30	Mitchell Barnett, Sione Mata'utia, Nathan Ross	Trent Hodkinson (3/3)	13,777
3 July	17	Canberra Raiders	GIO Stadium, Canberra	Lost	25-29 (GP)	Sione Mata'utia, Korbin Sims, Jake Mamo, Peter Mata'utia	Trent Hodkinson (4/5) (1FG)	9,731
7-11 July	18	Bye						
17 July	19	Melbourne Storm	Hunter Stadium, Newcastle	Lost	16-20	Jake Mamo 2, Brendan Elliot	Trent Hodkinson (2/3)	10,748
24 July	20	Cronulla-Sutherland Sharks	Southern Cross Group Stadium, Cronulla	Lost	4-36	Nathan Ross	Trent Hodkinson (0/1)	16,882
31 July	21	Manly-Warringah Sea Eagles	Brookvale Oval, Manly	Lost	16-36	Peter Mata'utia, David Bhana, Brendan Elliot	Trent Hodkinson (2/3)	11,222
6 August	22	Canterbury-Bankstown Bulldogs	Hunter Stadium, Newcastle	Lost	14-28	Brendan Elliot 2	Trent Hodkinson (3/3)	13,318
14 August	23	Penrith Panthers	Hunter Stadium, Newcastle	Lost	6-42	Brendan Elliot	Trent Hodkinson (1/1)	13,771
20 August	24	Gold Coast Titans	Hunter Stadium, Newcastle	Lost	6-26	Nathan Ross	Trent Hodkinson (1/1)	10,960
28 August	25	South Sydney Rabbitohs	Hunter Stadium, Newcastle	Lost	12-34	Dylan Phythian, Jake Mamo	Trent Hodkinson (1/1), Jeremy Smith (1/1)	15,212
3 September	26	St. George Illawarra Dragons	Jubilee Oval, Kogarah	Lost	26-28	Mitchell Barnett, Dane Gagai, Peter Mata'utia, Nathan Ross, Jacob Saifiti	Trent Hodkinson (3/5)	8,726
Legend: Win Loss Draw

== Statistics ==
Name	Appearances	Tries	Goals	Field goals	Points	Captain	Age
Chris Adams	5	0	0	0	0	0	30
Mitchell Barnett	9	2	0	0	8	0	22
David Bhana	7	1	0	0	4	0	23
Jack Cogger	6	0	0	0	0	0	19
Cory Denniss	7	3	0	0	12	0	19
Brendan Elliot	11	6	0	0	24	0	22
Jaelen Feeney	5	0	0	0	0	0	22
Lachlan Fitzgibbon	5	1	0	0	4	0	22
Dane Gagai	22	3	0	0	12	0	25
Trent Hodkinson	23	1	47	1	99	23	28
Josh King	12	0	0	0	0	0	21
Brock Lamb	3	0	0	0	0	0	19
Danny Levi	18	0	0	0	0	0	21
Jake Mamo	13	5	0	0	20	0	22
Sam Mataora	20	2	0	0	8	0	26
Chanel Mata'utia	1	0	0	0	0	0	24
Pat Mata'utia	14	2	0	0	8	0	23
Peter Mata'utia	11	3	0	0	12	0	26
Sione Mata'utia	16	4	0	0	16	0	20
Jarrod Mullen	14	0	0	0	0	0	29
Mickey Paea	15	0	0	0	0	0	30
Pauli Pauli	15	1	0	0	4	0	22
Will Pearsall	3	0	0	0	0	0	21
Dylan Phythian	2	1	0	0	4	0	21
Tyler Randell	18	1	0	0	4	0	24
Robbie Rochow	8	0	0	0	0	0	26
Nathan Ross	19	9	0	0	36	0	28
Daniel Saifiti	20	1	0	0	4	0	20
Jacob Saifiti	18	2	0	0	8	0	20
Korbin Sims	22	3	0	0	12	0	24
Tariq Sims	8	0	0	0	0	8	26
Jeremy Smith	21	0	1	0	2	21	36
Kade Snowden	1	0	0	0	0	0	30
Jack Stockwell	6	0	0	0	0	0	24
Akuila Uate	10	1	0	0	4	0	29
Totals	24	52	48	1	305	-	Average: 24

35 players used.

== Representative honours ==
The following players appeared in a representative match in 2016.

Australian Schoolboys

- Brodie Jones
- Pasami Saulo

Fiji

- Michael Potter (coach)
- Daniel Saifiti
- Korbin Sims
- Akuila Uate

Indigenous All Stars

- Dane Gagai

Junior Kiwis

- Ken Tofilau

Malta

- Ben Stone
- Sam Stone

New South Wales Country

- Tariq Sims

New South Wales Residents

- Matt Lantry (assistant coach)

New South Wales under-16s

- Tom Baker
- Phoenix Crossland
- Brock Gardner
- Jock Madden

New South Wales under-18s

- Brodie Jones
- Pasami Saulo
- Tom Starling

New South Wales under-20s

- Jack Cogger
- Cory Denniss

New Zealand

- Danny Levi (19th man)

Tonga

- Mickey Paea (18th man)

World All Stars

- Trent Hodkinson (squad member)
- Jeremy Smith

== Individual honours ==
=== Teams and squads ===
Emerging Blues Camp

- Tariq Sims

New South Wales Under-20s Origin Pathways Camp

- Jack Cogger

Queensland Academy of Sport Emerging Origin Squad

- Korbin Sims

=== Newcastle Knights awards ===
==== Player of the Year ====
- National Rugby League (NRL) Player of the Year: Dane Gagai
- Intrust Super Premiership NSW Player of the Year: Luke Yates
- National Youth Competition (NYC) Player of the Year: Nick Meaney

==== Players' Player ====
- National Rugby League (NRL) Players' Player: Sione Mata'utia
- Intrust Super Premiership NSW Players' Player: Ken Tofilau
- National Youth Competition (NYC) Players' Player: Nick Meaney

==== Coach's Award ====
- National Rugby League (NRL) Coach's Award: Nathan Ross
- Intrust Super Premiership NSW Coach's Award: Uiti Baker
- National Youth Competition (NYC) Coach's Award: Joe Morris

==== Brian Carlson Club-Andrew Johns Medal ====
- Pasami Saulo
