= 2017 Newcastle Knights season =

- NRL Rank: 16th (last)
- 2017 record: Wins: 5; draws: 0; losses: 19
- Points scored: For: 428; against: 648

Team information
- CEO: Matthew Gidley
- Coach: Nathan Brown
- Captain: Jamie Buhrer, Trent Hodkinson & Sione Mata'utia
- Stadium: McDonald Jones Stadium
- Avg. attendance: 15,619
- High attendance: 21,412 (vs. Roosters, round 7)

Top scorers
- Tries: Nathan Ross (10)
- Goals: Trent Hodkinson (46)
- Points: Trent Hodkinson (97)
← 2016	2018 →

The 2017 Newcastle Knights season was the 30th in the club's history. Coached by Nathan Brown and captained by Trent Hodkinson, before being replaced by Sione Mata'utia and Jamie Buhrer in the captaincy role, they competed in the NRL's 2017 Telstra Premiership, finishing the regular season in 16th place (out of 16).

== Milestones ==
- Round 1: Jamie Buhrer made his debut for the club, after previously playing for the Manly Warringah Sea Eagles.
- Round 1: Ken Sio made his debut for the club, after previously playing for the Hull Kingston Rovers.
- Round 1: Josh Starling made his debut for the club, after previously playing for the Manly Warringah Sea Eagles.
- Round 1: Jack Stockwell scored his 1st try for the club.
- Round 1: Sam Stone made his NRL debut for the club.
- Round 1: Luke Yates made his NRL debut for the club.
- Round 2: Sam Stone scored his 1st career try.
- Round 3: Brock Lamb kicked his 1st career goal.
- Round 3: Ken Sio scored his 1st try for the club.
- Round 4: Joe Wardle made his NRL debut for the club, after previously playing for the Huddersfield Giants.
- Round 5: Jacob Gagan made his debut for the club, after previously playing for the Cronulla-Sutherland Sharks and scored his 1st try for the club.
- Round 5: Sione Mata'utia played his 50th career game.
- Round 5: Anthony Tupou made his debut for the club, after previously playing for the Cronulla-Sutherland Sharks.
- Round 5: Joe Wardle scored his 1st try for the club.
- Round 8: Sione Mata'utia captained his 1st game for the club.
- Round 10: Brock Lamb scored his 1st career try.
- Round 14: Jaelen Feeney scored his 1st career try.
- Round 18: Jamie Buhrer captained his 1st game for the club.
- Round 20: Trent Hodkinson played his 150th career game.
- Round 20: Shaun Kenny-Dowall made his debut for the club, after previously playing for the Sydney Roosters, and scored his 1st try for the club.
- Round 25: Jamie Buhrer scored his 1st try for the club.

== Squad ==
Newcastle Knights
2017 NRL premiership squad				Coaching staff
179 Jarrod Mullen – FE (mid-season termination); 226 Peter Mata'utia – CE, FB, WG; 235 Dane Gagai – CE, FB, WG; 242 Korbin Sims – PR (pre-season loss); 249 Jake Mamo – FB (pre-season loss); 252 Chanel Mata'utia – WG; 253 Sione Mata'utia (c) – SR, CE, FE; 254 Tyler Randell – HK (mid-season loss); 255 Jack Stockwell – PR, LK; 258 Sam Mataora – PR (mid-season retirement); 260 Danny Levi – HK; 261 Lachlan Fitzgibbon – SR, PR; 262 Nathan Ross – WG, FB, CE	263 David Bhana – LK; 264 Jaelen Feeney – HB, FE, HK; 265 Trent Hodkinson (c) – HB, FE, HK (gk); 266 Pat Mata'utia – SR; 267 Pauli Pauli – PR; 268 Daniel Saifiti – PR; 269 Jacob Saifiti – PR, LK; 270 Cory Denniss – WG; 271 Mickey Paea – PR; 272 Will Pearsall – FE; 273 Josh King – LK, PR; 274 Brock Lamb – FE, HB (gk); 275 Jack Cogger – FE	276 Mitchell Barnett – LK, PR, SR; 277 Brendan Elliot – FB, WG, CE; 278 Dylan Phythian – FB; 279 Jamie Buhrer (c) – LK, SR, HK, FE; 280 Ken Sio – WG; 281 Josh Starling – PR; 282 Sam Stone – SR, LK, FE, CE; 283 Luke Yates – LK, PR; 284 Joe Wardle – CE, SR, LK; 285 Jacob Gagan – WG; 286 Anthony Tupou – PR, LK (mid-season retirement); 287 Shaun Kenny-Dowall – WG; 288 Tyrone Amey – PR	000 Tom Hughes – WG; 000 Brodie Jones – SR; 000 Rory Kostjasyn – HK (mid-season retirement); 000 Nick Meaney – FB; 000 Braden Robson – SR; 000 Pasami Saulo – PR; 000 Bradie Smith – SR; Extended squad players: Thomas Cronan – WG; Joe Morris – HK; Tom Starling – HK	Head coach: Nathan Brown; Assistant coaches: Michael Potter; Kurt Wrigley; Simon Woolford - ISP NSW coach; Todd Lowrie - NYC coach; Legend: (c) Captain(s); (vc) Vice-captain(s); Updated: 3 September 2017; Source(s): Newcastle Knights Profiles, Rugby League Project

== Transfers and Re-signings ==
=== Gains ===
Player/Coach	Previous club	Length
Jamie Buhrer	Manly Warringah Sea Eagles	2018
Thomas Cronan	Canberra Raiders	2017
Jacob Gagan	Cronulla-Sutherland Sharks	2017
Shaun Kenny-Dowall	Sydney Roosters	2019
Rory Kostjasyn	North Queensland Cowboys	2018
Ken Sio	Hull Kingston Rovers	2018
Josh Starling	Manly Warringah Sea Eagles	2017
Anthony Tupou	Wakefield Trinity Wildcats	2017
Joe Wardle	Huddersfield Giants	2019
Simon Woolford (ISP NSW coach)	Queanbeyan Blues	2017
Kurt Wrigley (assistant coach)	South Sydney Rabbitohs	2017

=== Losses ===
Player/Coach	Club
Chris Adams	Lakes United
Uiti Baker	Western Suburbs Rosellas
Danny Buderus (assistant coach)	Released
Krys Freeman	Central Queensland Capras
Tama Koopu	Norths Devils
Matt Lantry (ISP NSW coach)	Western Suburbs Rosellas
Todd Lowrie	Retirement
Robbie Rochow	South Sydney Rabbitohs
Tariq Sims	St. George Illawarra Dragons
Jeremy Smith	Retirement
Kade Snowden	Retirement
Joseph Tapine	Canberra Raiders
James Taylor	South Newcastle Lions
Ken Tofilau	Central Queensland Capras
Akuila Uate	Manly Warringah Sea Eagles
Tekina Vailea	Eastern Suburbs Tigers

=== Promoted juniors ===
Player	Junior side
Tyrone Amey	Knights Intrust Super Premiership NSW
Tom Hughes	Knights Intrust Super Premiership NSW
Brodie Jones	Knights National Youth Competition
Nick Meaney	Knights National Youth Competition
Joe Morris	Knights Intrust Super Premiership NSW
Pasami Saulo	Knights National Youth Competition
Tom Starling	Knights National Youth Competition
Sam Stone	Knights National Youth Competition

=== Change of role ===
Player/Coach	New role
Bryce Donovan	Knights second-tier squad

=== Re-signings ===
Player/Coach	Re-signed to
Mitchell Barnett	2020
Cory Denniss	2018
Lachlan Fitzgibbon	2019
Tom Hughes	2018
Danny Levi	2020
Nick Meaney	2018
Dylan Phythian	2018
Nathan Ross	2020
Daniel Saifiti	2020
Jacob Saifiti	2020
Tom Starling	2018
Sam Stone	2018
Luke Yates	2018

=== Player contract situations ===
2017 (left)	2018	2019	2020
David Bhana	Tyrone Amey	Lachlan Fitzgibbon	Mitchell Barnett
Brendan Elliot	Jamie Buhrer	Shaun Kenny-Dowall	Danny Levi
Jaelen Feeney	Jack Cogger		Nathan Ross
Dane Gagai	Thomas Cronan		Daniel Saifiti
Jacob Gagan	Cory Denniss		Jacob Saifiti
Rory Kostjasyn	Trent Hodkinson		
Jake Mamo	Tom Hughes		
Sam Mataora	Brodie Jones		
Peter Mata'utia	Josh King		
Joe Morris	Brock Lamb		
Jarrod Mullen	Chanel Mata'utia		
Mickey Paea	Pat Mata'utia		
Pauli Pauli	Sione Mata'utia		
Will Pearsall	Nick Meaney		
Tyler Randell	Dylan Phythian		
Braden Robson	Pasami Saulo		
Korbin Sims	Ken Sio		
Bradie Smith	Tom Starling		
Josh Starling	Sam Stone		
Jack Stockwell	Luke Yates		
Anthony Tupou			
Joe Wardle			

== Ladder ==
2017 NRL season
Pos	Team	Pld	W	D	L	B	PF	PA	PD	Pts
1	Melbourne Storm (P)	24	20	0	4	2	633	336	+297	44
2	Sydney Roosters	24	17	0	7	2	500	428	+72	38
3	Brisbane Broncos	24	16	0	8	2	597	433	+164	36
4	Parramatta Eels	24	16	0	8	2	496	457	+39	36
5	Cronulla-Sutherland Sharks	24	15	0	9	2	476	407	+69	34
6	Manly-Warringah Sea Eagles	24	14	0	10	2	552	512	+40	32
7	Penrith Panthers	24	13	0	11	2	504	459	+45	30
8	North Queensland Cowboys	24	13	0	11	2	467	443	+24	30
9	St. George Illawarra Dragons	24	12	0	12	2	533	450	+83	28
10	Canberra Raiders	24	11	0	13	2	558	497	+61	26
11	Canterbury-Bankstown Bulldogs	24	10	0	14	2	360	455	−95	24
12	South Sydney Rabbitohs	24	9	0	15	2	464	564	−100	22
13	New Zealand Warriors	24	7	0	17	2	444	575	−131	18
14	Wests Tigers	24	7	0	17	2	413	571	−158	18
15	Gold Coast Titans	24	7	0	17	2	448	638	−190	18
16	Newcastle Knights	24	5	0	19	2	428	648	−220	14

== Jerseys and sponsors ==
In 2017, the Knights' jerseys were made by ISC and their major sponsor was nib Health Funds.

2017 Home Jersey	2017 Away Jersey	2017 Indigenous Jersey	2017 ISC Marvel Heroes Iron Patriot Jersey	2017 NSW Mining Jersey

== Fixtures ==
=== Auckland Nines ===
Squad: 1. Peter Mata'utia 2. Ken Sio 3. Brendan Elliot 4. Nathan Ross 5. Cory Denniss 6. Brock Lamb 7. Jaelen Feeney 8. Daniel Saifiti 9. Danny Levi 10. Jacob Saifiti 11. Mitchell Barnett 12. Jamie Buhrer (c) 13. Luke Yates 14. Tyler Randell 15. Jack Stockwell 16. Sam Stone 17. Lachlan Fitzgibbon 18. Nick Meaney 19. Sione Mata'utia (Emergency Player)

Date	Round	Opponent	Venue	Score	Tries	Drop Goal Conversions	Attendance
Saturday, 4 February	Auckland Nines Game 5	Wests Tigers	Eden Park	18-10	K.Sio, N.Ross, S.Stone, M.Barnett	B.Lamb (1/4)	
Saturday, 4 February	Auckland Nines Game 13	Brisbane Broncos	Eden Park	8-21	D.Levi, P.Mata'utia		
Sunday, 5 February	Auckland Nines Game 22	Melbourne Storm	Eden Park	10-20	B.Lamb, C.Denniss	T.Randell (1/1)	
Legend: Win Loss Draw

=== Preseason trials ===
Date	Round	Opponent	Venue	Score	Tries	Goals	Attendance
Saturday, 18 February	Trial 1	Canberra Raiders	Seiffert Oval	44 – 0	D.Levi, P.Mata'utia, J.Buhrer, S.Mata'utia, T.Hodkinson, B.Elliot, C.Mata'utia, K.Sio	T.Hodkinson (4/5), B.Lamb (2/3)	6,350
Legend: Win Loss Draw

=== Regular season ===
Date	Round	Opponent	Venue	Score	Tries	Goals	Attendance
Sunday 5 March	1	New Zealand Warriors	Mt Smart Stadium	22 – 26	N. Ross (2), P. Mata'utia, J. Stockwell	T. Hodkinson (3/5)	13,712
Saturday 11 March	2	Gold Coast Titans	McDonald Jones Stadium	34 – 26	N. Ross (2), B. Elliot, P. Mata'utia, J. Stockwell, S. Stone	T. Hodkinson (5/6)	12,869
Saturday 18 March	3	South Sydney Rabbitohs	McDonald Jones Stadium	18 – 24	T. Hodkinson, P. Mata'utia, K. Sio	T. Hodkinson (2/3), B. Lamb (1/1)	15,212
Friday 24 March	4	Penrith Panthers	Pepper Stadium	0 – 40			10,567
Saturday 1 April	5	Cronulla-Sutherland Sharks	Southern Cross Stadium	18 – 19	Brendan Elliot, Jacob Gagan, Joe Wardle	Trent Hodkinson (3/3)	12,838
Friday 7 April	6	Canterbury-Bankstown Bulldogs	McDonald Jones Stadium	12 – 22	Dane Gagai, Nathan Ross	Trent Hodkinson (2/3)	16,929
Friday 14 April	7	Sydney Roosters	McDonald Jones Stadium	6 – 24	Ken Sio	Trent Hodkinson (1/1)	21,412
Saturday 22 April	8	North Queensland Cowboys	1300SMILES Stadium	12 – 24	Brendan Elliot, Nathan Ross	Brock Lamb (2/2)	13,878
Saturday 29 April	9	Gold Coast Titans	Cbus Super Stadium	8 – 38	Sam Stone	Brock Lamb (2/2)	10,511
Sunday 14 May	10	Canberra Raiders	McDonald Jones Stadium	34 – 20	Sione Mata'utia (2), Brock Lamb, Peter Mata'utia, Nathan Ross, Joe Wardle	Brock Lamb (5/7)	10,997
Sunday 21 May	11	Penrith Panthers	McDonald Jones Stadium	20 – 30	Brock Lamb, Peter Mata'utia, Daniel Saifiti	Brock Lamb (4/4)	13,319
	12	BYE					
Friday 2 June	13	Melbourne Storm	AAMI Park	12 – 40	Lachlan Fitzgibbon, Ken Sio	Brock Lamb (2/2)	11,070
Friday 9 June	14	Manly-Warringah Sea Eagles	Brookvale Oval	14 – 18	Jaelen Feeney, Daniel Levi	Brock Lamb (3/3)	4,189
	15	BYE					
Sunday 25 June	16	St George Illawarra	UOW Jubilee Oval	28 – 32	Nathan Ross (3), Brendan Elliot, Lachlan Fitzgibbon	Brock Lamb (4/6)	10,174
Sunday 2 July	17	Wests Tigers	McDonald Jones Stadium	12 – 33	Lachlan Fitzgibbon, Joe Wardle	Trent Hodkinson (2/2)	19,531
Sunday 9 July	18	Canterbury-Bankstown Bulldogs	Belmore	18 – 20	Peter Mata'utia (2), Chanel Mata'utia	Trent Hodkinson (3/4), Brock Lamb (0/1)	13,103
15 July 2017	19	Brisbane Broncos	McDonald Jones Stadium	34 – 22	Dane Gagai, Daniel Levi, Chanel Mata'utia, Sione Mata'utia	Trent Hodkinson (3/4)	13,773
Friday 21 July	20	Sydney Roosters	Allianz Stadium	4 – 28	Shaun Kenny-Dowall	Trent Hodkinson (0/1)	7,121
29 July 2017	21	St. George Illawarra Dragons	McDonald Jones Stadium	21 – 14	Shaun Kenny-Dowall, Brock Lamb, Jacob Sifiti	Trent Hodkinson (4/4) and (FG)	15,031
Saturday 5 August	22	New Zealand Warriors	McDonald Jones Stadium	26 – 10	Mitchell Barnett (2), Lachlan Fitzgibbon, Brock Lamb	Trent Hodkinson (5/6)	11,824
Friday 11 August	23	Parramatta Eels	ANZ Stadium	29 – 10	Ken Sio, Mitchell Barnett, Lachlan Fitzgibbon, Brock Lamb	Trent Hodkinson (4/5), Brett Lamb (FG)	13,141
Saturday 19 August	24	Melbourne Storm	McDonald Jones Stadium	12 – 44	Lachlan Fitzgibbon, Joe Wardle	Trent Hodkinson (2/2)	16,001
Friday 25 August	25	Canberra Raiders	GIO Stadium	28 – 46	Shaun Kenny-Dowall, Mitchell Barnett, Jamie Buhrer, Daniel Saifiti	Trent Hodkinson (4/5)	10,523
Sunday 3 September	26	Cronulla-Sutherland Sharks	McDonald Jones Stadium	18 – 26	Lachlan Fitzgibbon (2), Daniel Levi	Trent Hodkinson (3/3)	20,535
Legend: Win Loss Draw

== Statistics ==
Name	Appearances	Tries	Goals	Field goals	Points	Captain	Age
Tyrone Amey	1	0	0	0	0	0	21
Mitchell Barnett	22	4	0	0	16	0	23
Jamie Buhrer	16	1	0	0	4	9	28
Jack Cogger	2	0	0	0	0	0	20
Brendan Elliot	12	4	0	0	16	0	23
Jaelen Feeney	8	1	0	0	4	0	23
Lachlan Fitzgibbon	14	8	0	0	32	0	23
Dane Gagai	23	2	0	0	8	0	26
Jacob Gagan	1	1	0	0	4	0	24
Trent Hodkinson	17	1	46	1	97	7	29
Shaun Kenny-Dowall	6	4	0	0	16	0	29
Josh King	15	0	0	0	0	0	22
Brock Lamb	21	5	23	1	67	0	20
Danny Levi	24	3	0	0	12	0	22
Sam Mataora	1	0	0	0	0	0	27
Chanel Mata'utia	4	2	0	0	8	0	25
Peter Mata'utia	24	7	0	0	28	0	27
Sione Mata'utia	22	3	0	0	12	15	21
Mickey Paea	5	0	0	0	0	0	31
Dylan Phythian	1	0	0	0	0	0	22
Tyler Randell	5	0	0	0	0	0	25
Nathan Ross	20	10	0	0	40	0	29
Daniel Saifiti	23	2	0	0	8	0	21
Jacob Saifiti	21	1	0	0	4	0	21
Ken Sio	21	5	0	0	20	0	27
Josh Starling	13	0	0	0	0	0	27
Jack Stockwell	10	2	0	0	8	0	25
Sam Stone	16	2	0	0	8	0	20
Anthony Tupou	4	0	0	0	0	0	34
Joe Wardle	17	4	0	0	16	0	26
Luke Yates	19	0	0	0	0	0	22
Totals	24	72	69	2	418	-	Average: 25

31 players used.

== Representative honours ==
The following players appeared in a representative match in 2017.

Australia

- Dane Gagai

Australian Schoolboys

- Luke Huth (squad member)

Cook Islands

- Sam Mataora

Fiji

- Michael Potter (coach)
- Daniel Saifiti
- Jacob Saifiti

Indigenous All Stars

- Dane Gagai

Italy

- Jack Johns

Junior Kangaroos

- Sam Stone

New South Wales City

- Pauli Pauli
- Nathan Ross

New South Wales Residents

- Josh King (18th man)
- Nick Meaney (19th man)

New South Wales under-16s

- Bradman Best
- Harry Croker
- Cooper Jenkins
- Jaron Purcell (captain)

New South Wales under-20s

- Nick Meaney

New Zealand

- Danny Levi

Prime Minister's XIII

- Dane Gagai

Queensland

- Dane Gagai

Samoa

- Peter Mata'utia
- Sione Mata'utia

Scotland

- Joe Wardle (train-on squad)

World All Stars

- Sione Mata'utia

== Individual honours ==
=== Teams and squads ===
Intrust Super Premiership New South Wales Team of the Year

- Tom Hughes

=== Newcastle Knights awards ===
==== Player of the Year ====
- National Rugby League (NRL) Player of the Year: Mitchell Barnett
- Intrust Super Premiership NSW Player of the Year: Nick Meaney
- National Youth Competition (NYC) Player of the Year: Zac Hosking

==== Players' Player ====
- National Rugby League (NRL) Players' Player: Daniel Saifiti
- Intrust Super Premiership NSW Players' Player: Tom Hughes
- National Youth Competition (NYC) Players' Player: Matt Cooper

==== Coach's Award ====
- National Rugby League (NRL) Coach's Award: Jamie Buhrer
- Intrust Super Premiership NSW Coach's Award: Braden Robson
- National Youth Competition (NYC) Coach's Award: Heath Gibbs
