= 2018 Newcastle Knights season =

- NRL Rank: 11th
- 2018 record: Wins: 9; draws: 0; losses: 15
- Points scored: For: 414; against: 607

Team information
- CEO: Phil Gardner
- Coach: Nathan Brown
- Captain: Jamie Buhrer & Mitchell Pearce
- Stadium: McDonald Jones Stadium
- Avg. attendance: 18,974
- High attendance: 24,662 (vs. Dragons, round 25)

Top scorers
- Tries: Ken Sio (12)
- Goals: Kalyn Ponga (27)
- Points: Ken Sio (98)
← 2017	2019 →

The 2018 Newcastle Knights season was the 31st in the club's history. Coached by Nathan Brown and co-captained by Jamie Buhrer and Mitchell Pearce, they competed in the NRL's 2018 Telstra Premiership, finishing the regular season in 11th place (out of 16).

== Milestones ==
- Round 1: Herman Ese'ese made his debut for the club, after previously playing for the Brisbane Broncos.
- Round 1: Slade Griffin made his debut for the club, after previously playing for the Melbourne Storm and scored his 1st try for the club.
- Round 1: Aidan Guerra made his debut for the club, after previously playing for the Sydney Roosters.
- Round 1: Chris Heighington made his debut for the club, after previously playing for the Cronulla-Sutherland Sharks.
- Round 1: Jacob Lillyman made his debut for the club, after previously playing for the New Zealand Warriors.
- Round 1: Tautau Moga made his debut for the club, after previously playing for the Brisbane Broncos.
- Round 1: Mitchell Pearce made his debut for the club, after previously playing for the Sydney Roosters, captained his 1st game for the club and kicked his 1st field goal for the club.
- Round 1: Kalyn Ponga made his debut for the club, after previously playing for the North Queensland Cowboys, scored his 1st try for the club and kicked his 1st career goal.
- Round 1: Connor Watson made his debut for the club, after previously playing for the Sydney Roosters.
- Round 2: Aidan Guerra scored his 1st try for the club.
- Round 2: Tautau Moga scored his 1st try for the club.
- Round 2: Connor Watson scored his 1st try for the club.
- Round 4: Chris Heighington scored his 1st try for the club.
- Round 5: Danny Levi played his 50th career game.
- Round 5: Nathan Ross played his 50th career game.
- Round 7: Jamie Buhrer played his 150th career game.
- Round 7: Mitchell Pearce scored his 1st try for the club.
- Round 7: Daniel Saifiti played his 50th career game.
- Round 8: Aidan Guerra captained his 1st game for the club.
- Round 8: Ken Sio kicked his 1st goal for the club.
- Round 11: Herman Ese'ese scored his 1st try for the club.
- Round 13: Jack Cogger scored his 1st career try.
- Round 16: Connor Watson played his 50th career game.
- Round 18: Nick Meaney made his NRL debut for the club.
- Round 19: Mitchell Barnett played his 50th career game.
- Round 19: Nick Meaney scored his 1st career try.
- Round 21: Mitchell Barnett played his 50th game for the club.
- Round 21: Herman Ese'ese played his 50th career game.
- Round 21: JJ Felise made his debut for the club, after previously playing for the Wests Tigers.
- Round 21: Shaun Kenny-Dowall played his 250th career game.
- Round 22: Mitchell Pearce played his 250th career game.
- Round 22: Pasami Saulo made his NRL debut for the club.
- Round 25: Nick Meaney kicked his 1st career goal.
- Round 25: Tom Starling made his NRL debut for the club.

== Squad ==
Newcastle Knights
2018 NRL premiership squad				Coaching staff
252 Chanel Mata'utia – WG (pre-season loss); 253 Sione Mata'utia – CE, FE, WG; 260 Danny Levi – HK; 261 Lachlan Fitzgibbon – SR; 262 Nathan Ross – CE, WG; 265 Trent Hodkinson – HB (pre-season loss); 266 Pat Mata'utia – SR; 268 Daniel Saifiti – PR; 269 Jacob Saifiti – PR; 270 Cory Denniss – CE; 273 Josh King – PR; 274 Brock Lamb – FE, HB (gk); 275 Jack Cogger – HB, FE	276 Mitchell Barnett – SR, LK, PR; 278 Dylan Phythian – FB (mid-season termination); 279 Jamie Buhrer (c) – LK, SR, FE, HK, CE; 280 Ken Sio – WG (gk); 282 Sam Stone – SR, LK; 283 Luke Yates – LK, HK, PR; 287 Shaun Kenny-Dowall – WG, CE; 288 Tyrone Amey – PR; 289 Herman Ese'ese – PR, LK; 290 Slade Griffin – HK, LK; 291 Aidan Guerra (vc) – SR, LK, PR, CE; 292 Chris Heighington – PR; 293 Jacob Lillyman – PR	294 Tautau Moga – CE; 295 Mitchell Pearce (c) – HB; 296 Kalyn Ponga – FB, FE (gk); 297 Connor Watson – FE, FB, HK, CE; 298 Nick Meaney – FB (gk); 299 JJ Felise – PR; 300 Pasami Saulo – PR; 301 Tom Starling – HK; 000 Matt Cooper – FB; 000 Christian Hazard – HB; 000 Zac Hosking – LK; 000 Tom Hughes – WG; 000 Jack Johns – FE	000 Brodie Jones – SR; 000 Brayden Musgrove – WG; 000 Brent Naden – CE; Extended squad players: Thomas Cronan – WG	Head coach: Nathan Brown; Assistant coaches: Michael Potter; James Shepherd; Simon Woolford (mid-season loss) - ISP NSW coach; Rory Kostjasyn - ISP NSW coach; Todd Lowrie - Jersey Flegg Cup coach; Legend: (c) Captain(s); (vc) Vice-captain(s); Updated: 2 September 2018; Source(s): Newcastle Knights Profiles, Rugby League Project

== Transfers and Re-signings ==
=== Gains ===
Player/Coach	Previous club	Length
Herman Ese'ese	Brisbane Broncos	2020
JJ Felise	Wests Tigers	2018
Slade Griffin	Melbourne Storm	2019
Aidan Guerra	Sydney Roosters	2020
Christian Hazard	Redcliffe Dolphins	2018
Chris Heighington	Cronulla-Sutherland Sharks	2018
Jacob Lillyman	New Zealand Warriors	2018
Tautau Moga	Brisbane Broncos	2020
Brent Naden	Canberra Raiders	2018
Mitchell Pearce	Sydney Roosters	2021
Kalyn Ponga	North Queensland Cowboys	2021
James Shepherd (assistant coach)	Cronulla-Sutherland Sharks	2018
Connor Watson	Sydney Roosters	2020

=== Losses ===
Player/Coach	Club
David Bhana	Released
Brendan Elliot	Gold Coast Titans
Jaelen Feeney	Townsville Blackhawks
Dane Gagai	South Sydney Rabbitohs
Jacob Gagan	South Sydney Rabbitohs
Heath Gibbs	Wests Tigers
Rory Kostjasyn	Retirement
Jake Mamo	Huddersfield Giants
Sam Mataora	Retirement
Peter Mata'utia	Leigh Centurions
Sam McIntyre	Wests Tigers
Jarrod Mullen	Contract terminated
Mickey Paea	Hull F.C.
Pauli Pauli	Wakefield Trinity
Will Pearsall	Retirement
Tyler Randell	Wakefield Trinity
Braden Robson	Wests Tigers
Korbin Sims	Brisbane Broncos
Bradie Smith	Wyong Roos
Josh Starling	Retirement
Jack Stockwell	Gold Coast Titans
Anthony Tupou	Retirement
Joe Wardle	Castleford Tigers
Kurt Wrigley (assistant coach)	Released

=== Promoted juniors ===
Player	Junior side
Matt Cooper	Knights National Youth Competition
Zac Hosking	Knights National Youth Competition
Jack Johns	Knights National Youth Competition
Brayden Musgrove	Knights National Youth Competition

=== Change of role ===
Player/Coach	New role
Rory Kostjasyn (Harold Matthews Cup coach)	Knights Intrust Super Premiership NSW coach
Joe Morris	Knights second-tier squad

=== Re-signings ===
Player/Coach	Re-signed to
Tyrone Amey	2018
Nathan Brown (head coach)	ongoing contract
Jamie Buhrer	2019
Matt Cooper	2018
Zac Hosking	2018
Jack Johns	2018
Josh King	2020
Sione Mata'utia	2021
Brayden Musgrove	2019
Pasami Saulo	2020
Sam Stone	2020

=== Player contract situations ===
2018 (left)	2019	2020	2021
Tyrone Amey	Jamie Buhrer	Mitchell Barnett	Sione Mata'utia
Jack Cogger	Lachlan Fitzgibbon	Herman Ese'ese	Mitchell Pearce
Matt Cooper	Slade Griffin	Aidan Guerra	Kalyn Ponga
Thomas Cronan	Brodie Jones	Josh King	
Cory Denniss	Shaun Kenny-Dowall	Danny Levi	
JJ Felise	Brayden Musgrove	Tautau Moga	
Christian Hazard		Nathan Ross	
Chris Heighington		Daniel Saifiti	
Trent Hodkinson		Jacob Saifiti	
Zac Hosking		Pasami Saulo	
Tom Hughes		Sam Stone	
Jack Johns		Connor Watson	
Brock Lamb			
Jacob Lillyman			
Chanel Mata'utia			
Pat Mata'utia			
Nick Meaney			
Brent Naden			
Dylan Phythian			
Ken Sio			
Tom Starling			
Luke Yates			

== Ladder ==
2018 NRL season
Pos	Team	Pld	W	D	L	B	PF	PA	PD	Pts
1	Sydney Roosters	24	16	0	8	1	542	361	+181	34
2	Melbourne Storm	24	16	0	8	1	536	363	+173	34
3	South Sydney Rabbitohs	24	16	0	8	1	582	437	+145	34
4	Cronulla-Sutherland Sharks	24	16	0	8	1	519	423	+96	34
5	Penrith Panthers	24	15	0	9	1	517	461	+56	32
6	Brisbane Broncos	24	15	0	9	1	556	500	+56	32
7	St. George Illawarra Dragons	24	15	0	9	1	519	472	+47	32
8	New Zealand Warriors	24	15	0	9	1	472	447	+25	32
9	Wests Tigers	24	12	0	12	1	377	460	−83	26
10	Canberra Raiders	24	10	0	14	1	563	540	+23	22
11	Newcastle Knights	24	9	0	15	1	414	607	−193	20
12	Canterbury-Bankstown Bulldogs	24	8	0	16	1	428	474	−46	18
13	North Queensland Cowboys	24	8	0	16	1	449	521	−72	18
14	Gold Coast Titans	24	8	0	16	1	472	582	−110	18
15	Manly-Warringah Sea Eagles	24	7	0	17	1	500	622	−122	16
16	Parramatta Eels	24	6	0	18	1	374	550	−176	14

== Jerseys and sponsors ==
In 2018, the Knights' jerseys were made by ISC and their major sponsor was nib Health Funds.

2018 Home Jersey	2018 Away Jersey	2018 Heritage Jersey	2018 Indigenous Jersey	2018 MHF Beanie For Brain Cancer Jersey	2018 NSW Mining Jersey	2018 Women In League Jersey

== Fixtures ==
=== Preseason trials ===
Date	Round	Opponent	Venue	Score	Tries	Goals	Attendance
Wednesday, 7 February	Trial 1	Melbourne Storm	AAMI Park	26 – 22	L.Fitzgibbon, K.Ponga, K.Sio, J.Buhrer, T.Cronan	K.Ponga (2/3), B.Lamb (1/2)	closed to public
Saturday, 24 February	Trial 2	Parramatta Eels	Maitland No.1 Sportsground	6 – 26	S.Kenny-Dowall	K.Ponga (1/1)	
Legend: Win Loss Draw

=== Regular season ===
Date	Round	Opponent	Venue	Score	Tries	Goals	Attendance
9 March	1	Manly-Warringah Sea Eagles	McDonald Jones Stadium, Newcastle	19-18	K. Ponga, S. Griffin, L. Fitzgibbon	K. Ponga (3/3), M. Pearce (FG)	23,516
18 March	2	Canberra Raiders	GIO Stadium, Canberra	30-28	L. Fitzgibbon, A. Guerra, S. Mata'utia, T. Moga, C. Watson	K. Ponga (5/6)	12,626
25 March	3	Sydney Roosters	Allianz Stadium, Sydney	8-38	A. Guerra	K. Ponga (2/3)	15,153
1 April	4	St. George Illawarra Dragons	WIN Stadium, Wollongong	12-30	T. Moga, C. Heighington	K. Ponga (2/2)	18,589
7 April	5	Brisbane Broncos	McDonald Jones Stadium, Newcastle	15-10	L. Fitzgibbon, D. Saifiti	K. Ponga (3/3), M. Pearce (FG)	21,969
13 April	6	Melbourne Storm	AAMI Park, Melbourne	14-40	K. Sio (2), L. Fitzgibbon	K. Ponga (1/3)	12,386
21 April	7	Wests Tigers	Scully Park, Tamworth	22-20	K. Sio (3), S. Kenny-Dowall, M. Pearce	K. Ponga (1/5)	10,082
27 April	8	Manly-Warringah Sea Eagles	Lottoland, Manly	18-12	S. Griffin, N. Ross, C. Watson	K. Sio (3/4)	5,715
4 May	9	South Sydney Rabbitohs	McDonald Jones Stadium, Newcastle	18-36	S. Kenny-Dowall (2), S. Mata'utai, L. Fitzgibbon	K. Sio (1/4)	22,718
11 May	10	Penrith Panthers	McDonald Jones Stadium, Newcastle	18-29	K. Ponga, N. Ross, C. Watson	B. Lamb (2/2), K. Sio (1/1)	14,801
19 May	11	Gold Coast Titans	Cbus Super Stadium, Robina	26-33	H. Ese'ese, S. Mata'utia, K. Ponga, K. Sio	B. Lamb (5/5)	11,008
27 May	12	Cronulla-Sutherland Sharks	McDonald Jones Stadium, Newcastle	10-48	L. Fitzgibbon, S. Mata'utia	K. Sio (1/1), K. Ponga (0/1)	20,913
2 June	13	Parramatta Eels	ANZ Stadium, Sydney	30-4	J. Cogger, S. Mata'utia, D. Saifiti, K. Sio, C. Watson	K. Ponga (5/6)	7,719
9 June	14	Sydney Roosters	McDonald Jones Stadium, Newcastle	16-18	S. Mata'utia, K. Ponga	K. Ponga (4/4)	18,029
17 June	15	Melbourne Storm	McDonald Jones Stadium, Newcastle	10-28	K. Ponga, K. Sio	K. Ponga (1/2)	14,803
30 June	16	Canterbury-Bankstown Bulldogs	McDonald Jones Stadium, Newcastle	16-36	C. Watson (2), H. Ese'ese	K. Sio (2/3)	17,755
	17	Bye					
13 July	18	Parramatta Eels	McDonald Jones Stadium, Newcastle	18-16	C. Watson, S. Kenny-Dowall, M. Pearce	K. Sio (3/4)	15,860
21 July	19	Gold Coast Titans	McDonald Jones Stadium, Newcastle	30-24	M. Barnett (2), N. Meaney, L. Fitzgibbon, S. Kenny-Dowall	K. Sio (5/6)	14,095
27 July	20	North Queensland Cowboys	1300SMILES Stadium, Townsville	18-20	L. Fitzgibbon (2), A. Guerra	K. Sio (3/4)	11,709
3 August	21	Wests Tigers	McDonald Jones Stadium, Newcastle	16-25	A. Guerra, S. Mata'utia, K. Ponga	K. Sio (2/3)	18,561
10 August	22	New Zealand Warriors	Mt Smart Stadium, Auckland	4-20	K. Sio	K. Sio (0/1)	14,395
18 August	23	Penrith Panthers	Panthers Stadium, Penrith				
26 August	24	Cronulla Sutherland Sharks	Southern Cross Group Stadium, Cronulla				
1 September	25	St George Illawarra Dragons	McDonald Jones Stadium, Newcastle				
Legend: Win Loss Draw

== Statistics ==
Name	Appearances	Tries	Goals	Field goals	Points	Captain	Age
Mitchell Barnett	23	2	0	0	8	0	24
Jamie Buhrer	20	0	0	0	0	20	29
Jack Cogger	12	1	0	0	4	0	21
Cory Denniss	11	1	0	0	4	0	21
Herman Ese'ese	23	2	0	0	8	0	24
JJ Felise	2	0	0	0	0	0	22
Lachlan Fitzgibbon	21	9	0	0	36	0	24
Slade Griffin	16	2	0	0	8	0	27
Aidan Guerra	24	5	0	0	20	9	30
Chris Heighington	21	1	0	0	4	0	36
Shaun Kenny-Dowall	24	6	0	0	24	0	30
Josh King	13	0	0	0	0	0	23
Brock Lamb	8	0	7	0	14	0	21
Danny Levi	17	0	0	0	0	0	23
Jacob Lillyman	15	0	0	0	0	0	34
Sione Mata'utia	23	8	0	0	32	0	22
Nick Meaney	5	2	1	0	10	0	21
Tautau Moga	4	2	0	0	8	0	25
Mitchell Pearce	15	2	0	2	10	15	29
Kalyn Ponga	20	6	27	0	78	0	20
Nathan Ross	15	2	0	0	8	0	30
Daniel Saifiti	21	3	0	0	12	0	22
Jacob Saifiti	8	0	0	0	0	0	22
Pasami Saulo	3	0	0	0	0	0	20
Ken Sio	20	12	25	0	98	0	28
Tom Starling	1	0	0	0	0	0	20
Sam Stone	2	0	0	0	0	0	21
Connor Watson	15	7	0	0	28	0	22
Luke Yates	6	0	0	0	0	0	23
Totals	24	73	60	2	414	-	Average: 25

29 players used.

== Representative honours ==
The following players appeared in a representative match in 2018.

Australian Schoolboys

- Timanu Alexander (squad member)
- Bradman Best
- Harry Croker
- Jock Madden
- Starford To'a

Fiji

- Junior Roqica

Junior Kiwis

- Pasami Saulo (squad member)

New South Wales under-16s

- Thomas Cant

New South Wales under-18s

- Bradman Best
- Phoenix Crossland
- Brock Gardner (squad member)
- Jock Madden
- Jaron Purcell

New Zealand

- Herman Ese'ese
- Slade Griffin
- Danny Levi (squad member)

Queensland

- Kalyn Ponga

Queensland under-20s

- Beau Fermor

== Individual honours ==
=== Newcastle Knights awards ===
==== Player of the Year ====
- National Rugby League (NRL) Player of the Year: Kalyn Ponga
- Intrust Super Premiership NSW Player of the Year: Luke Yates
- Jersey Flegg Cup Player of the Year: Beau Fermor

==== Players' Player ====
- National Rugby League (NRL) Players' Player: Kalyn Ponga
- Intrust Super Premiership NSW Players' Player: Luke Yates
- Jersey Flegg Cup Players' Player: Mat Croker

==== Coach's Award ====
- National Rugby League (NRL) Coach's Award: Aidan Guerra
- Intrust Super Premiership NSW Coach's Award: Zac Hosking
- Jersey Flegg Cup Coach's Award: Kurtis Dark
