= Nathan Hinton =

Australian rugby league footballer

Personal information
- Born: 13 October 1985 (age 39); Newcastle, New South Wales, Australia

Playing information
Club
Years	Team	Pld	T	G	FG	P
2006–07	Newcastle Knights	7	14	0	0	8
- Source: RLP

Nathan Hinton was a rugby league footballer for the Newcastle Knights of the National Rugby League. He played in the National Rugby League for two years before being leaving the Knights.

== Playing career ==
Hailing from Newcastle, New South Wales, Hinton played his junior football for Western Suburbs Rosellas. He later played for the Newcastle Knights in 2006 and 2007.
