= Trent Hodkinson =

Australian rugby league footballer (born 1988)

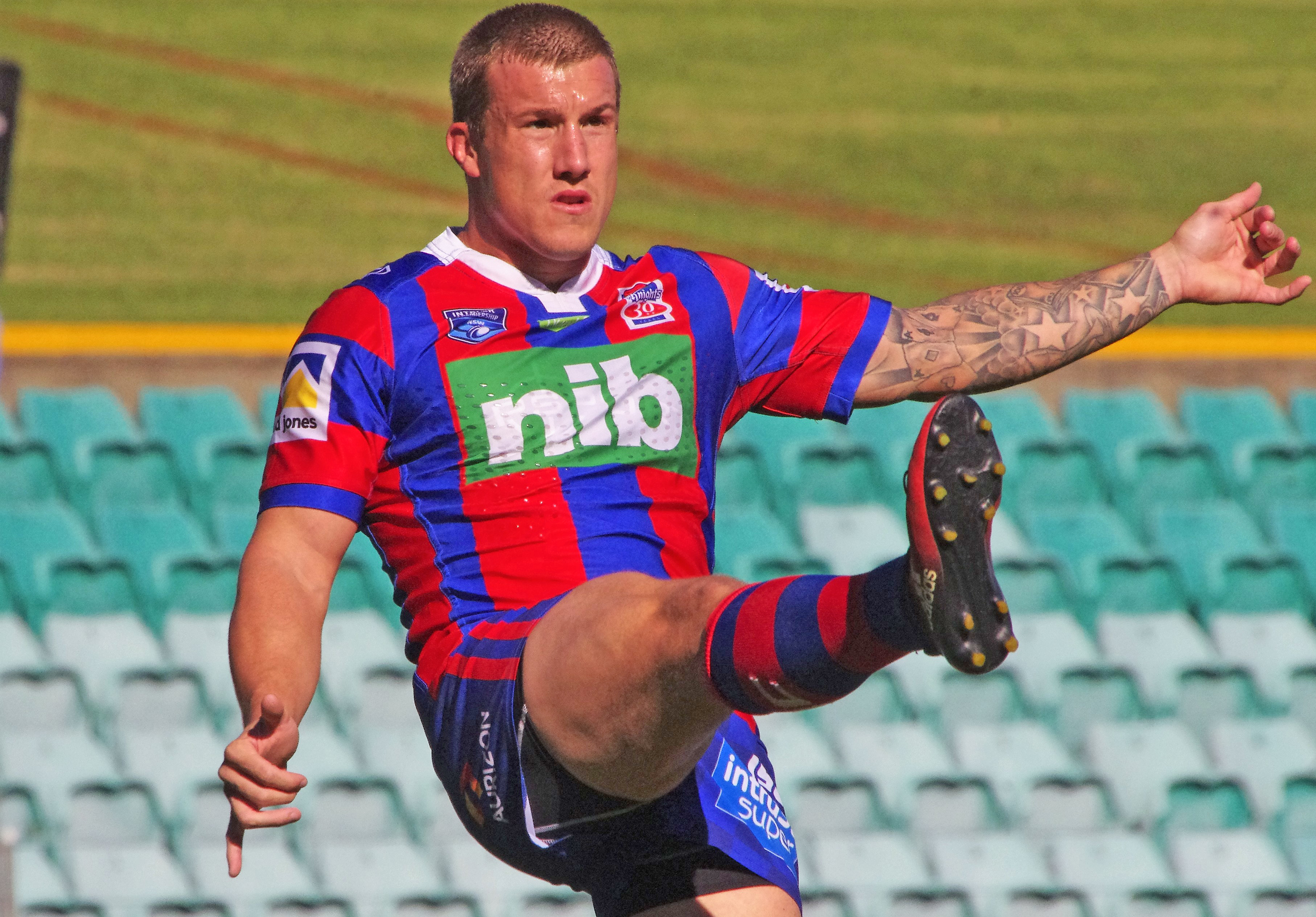

Personal information
- Full name: Trent Hodkinson
- Born: 31 August 1988 (age 38) Campbelltown, New South Wales, Australia

Playing information
- Height: 178 cm (5 ft 10 in)
- Weight: 92 kg (14 st 7 lb)
- Position: Halfback, Five-eighth
Club
Years	Team	Pld	T	G	FG	P
2010	Manly Sea Eagles	24	4	0	3	19
2011–15	Canterbury Bulldogs	92	12	179	11	417
2016–17	Newcastle Knights	40	2	93	2	196
2018	Cronulla Sharks	4	0	0	0	0
2018–19	Manly Sea Eagles	14	2	22	0	52
	Total	174	20	294	16	684
Representative
Years	Team	Pld	T	G	FG	P
2009	Queensland Residents	1	0	3	0	6
2010	NSW City	1	0	3	0	6
2014–15	New South Wales	6	1	12	0	28

Trent Hodkinson (born 31 August 1988) is an Australian former professional rugby league footballer who played as a halfback in the NRL.

He played for the Manly Warringah Sea Eagles in two separate spells, the Canterbury-Bankstown Bulldogs, Newcastle Knights and the Cronulla-Sutherland Sharks in the National Rugby League. Hodkinson played for NSW City and New South Wales in the State of Origin series.

== Background ==
Hodkinson was born in Campbelltown, New South Wales, Australia.

He played his junior rugby league for the Cabramatta Two Blues while attending Westfields Sports High School. He was then signed by the Parramatta Eels.

== Playing career ==
=== Early career ===
In October 2007, Hodkinson played for the Junior Kangaroos against the Junior Kiwis. After progressing through the Parramatta Eels S. G. Ball Cup and Harold Matthews Cup squads, he played for the Eels' NYC team in 2008. In July 2008, he signed a contract with the Manly Warringah Sea Eagles starting in 2009. In 2009, he played for the Sea Eagles' Queensland Cup team, Sunshine Coast Sea Eagles and was named the club's Player of the Year. On 15 July 2009, he played at halfback for the Queensland Residents against the New South Wales Residents in Queensland's 34–6 win at Suncorp Stadium. On 12 September 2009, he played in the Sea Eagles' 2009 Queensland Cup Grand Final win over the Northern Pride RLFC.

=== 2010 : NRL Debut ===
In round 2 of the 2010 NRL season, Hodkinson made his NRL debut for Manly against his former club the Parramatta Eels, in the Sea Eagles' 24–20 loss at Parramatta Stadium. He scored a try on debut. On 7 May 2010, after impressing in only six matches, he played for New South Wales city against New South Wales Country, kicking 3 goals in City's 36–18 loss at Port Macquarie Regional Stadium. On 15 June 2010, he signed a three-year contract with the Canterbury-Bankstown Bulldogs starting in 2011. In round 15 against the South Sydney Rabbitohs at Brookvale Oval, he kicked two field goals to win the match for the Sea Eagles 26–25. He finished off his debut year in the NRL, having played in 24 matches, scoring four tries and kicking three field goals.

=== 2011 : New Club ===
In round 1 of the 2011 NRL season, Hodkinson made his Canterbury debut against the Wests Tigers, playing at halfback in Canterbury's 24–14 win at ANZ Stadium. He scored his first Canterbury try in round 7 against the South Sydney Rabbitohs, in the Canterbury's 36–24 win at ANZ Stadium. In round 20 against the Parramatta Eels at ANZ Stadium, he repeated his feat of the previous year and kicked two field goals in the Canterbury's golden point extra time 8–7 win. He finished off 2011 having played in 22 matches, scoring two tries and kicking three field goals.

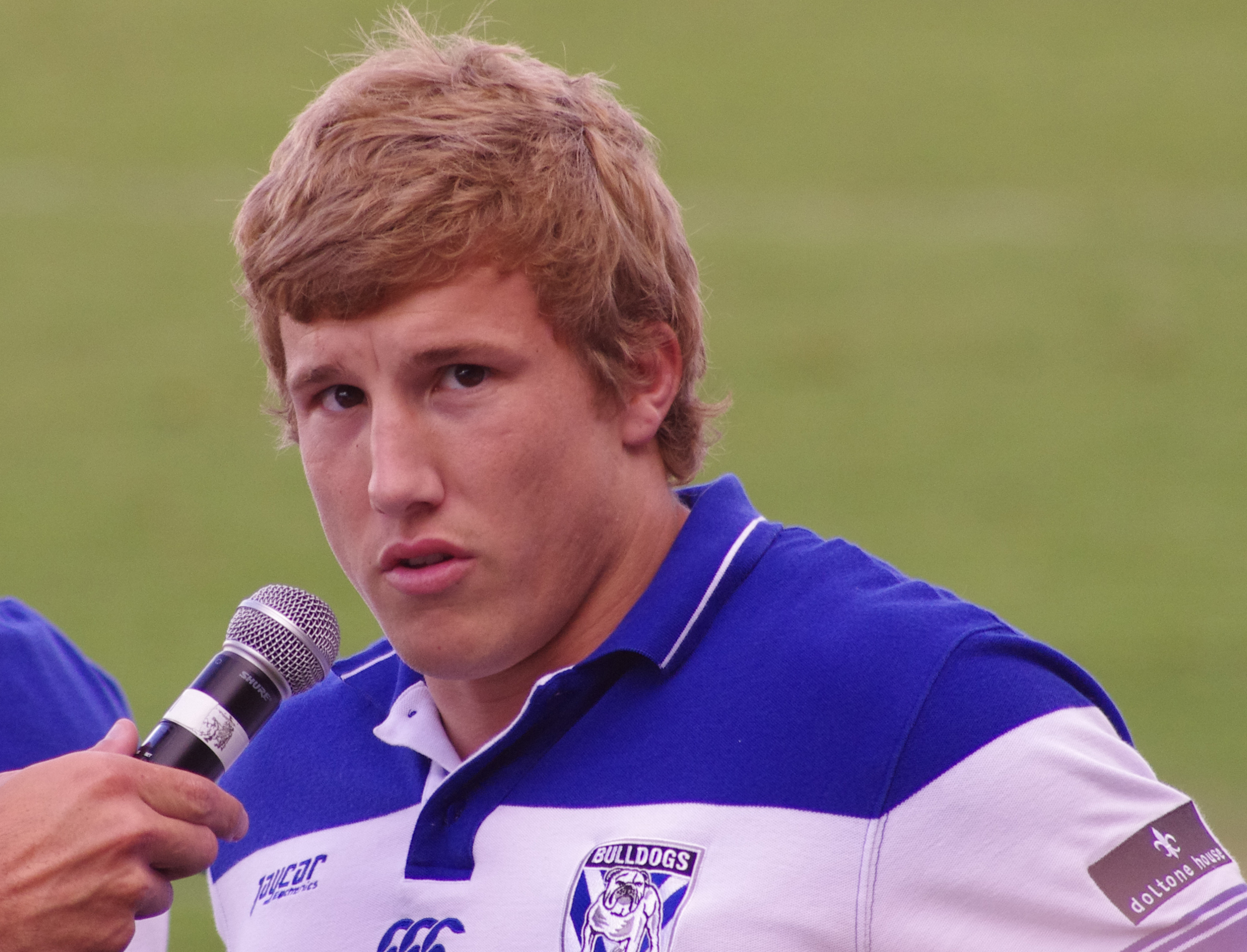
Hodkinson representing the Bulldogs

=== 2012 : Injury Interrupted Season ===
Hodkinson only played in six matches in the 2012 NRL season, after undergoing shoulder and knee operations for injuries that interrupted his season.

=== 2013 ===
Hodkinson played his first match for Canterbury in the 2013 season in round 6 against the Sydney Roosters at SFS in Canterbury's 38–0 loss. Hodkinson was appointed the new goal kicker for Canterbury due to his impressive goal kicking when he was biding his time in the NSW Cup. On 4 September 2013, Hodkinson re-signed with the Canterbury club until the end of the 2015 season. Hodkinson finished the 2013 NRL season with him playing in 20 matches, scoring four tries, kicking 64 goals and kicking three field goals.

=== 2014 : State of Origin, Co-captain and NRL Grand Final ===
After being injured over the 2012 season Hodkinson was unable to cement his spot as starting halfback for the Canterbury-Bankstown Bulldogs, until the 2014 season shining on multiple occasions to get Canterbury to seven successive victories. Hodkinsion was subsequently selected to make his State of Origin debut for New South Wales in Game I of the 2014 series. Hodkinson and fellow Bulldogs player Josh Reynolds replaced the incumbent halves pairing of Mitchell Pearce and James Maloney for the 2014 series and led NSW to a 12–8 victory in Game 1 at Suncorp Stadium. Hodkinson was called up to the Blues squad again for Game 2. After 71 minutes of play Hodkinson crossed over to score the match's first try, to level the scores with the Maroons. His conversion decided the score 6–4. The Blues held on to win after eight years of Maroon dominance, with Hodkinson scoring the Blues only points. Hodkinson played in Game 3, kicking two goals in NSW 32–8 loss at Suncorp Stadium. Hodkinson led the Bulldogs into the Top 8 at the end of the season. During the Bulldogs vs Melbourne Storm Elimination Final round, Hodkinson kicked four goals and scored a try to assist his team to a 28–4 win. In the Semi-Final the Bulldogs played a close game with the Manly Warringah Sea Eagles, with Hodkinson kicking two field goals to win for Canterbury's 18–17. In the Preliminary Final the Canterbury side beat Penrith 18–12 with Hodkinson kicking three goals to secure their place in the 2014 NRL Grand Final. In the week leading to the Grand Final, when Canterbury captain Michael Ennis was ruled out of the 2014 NRL Grand Final due to a foot injury, Hodkinson along with teammate James Graham were named co-captains of Canterbury for the match. Hodkinson kicked goal goal in Canterbury's 30–6 Grand Final loss. Hodkinson finished his 2014 NRL season for the Bulldogs with him playing 25 matches, scoring five tries, kicking 68 goals and kicking four field goals.

=== 2015 : Last season at the Bulldogs ===
In round 3 against the Manly-Warringah Sea Eagles, Hodkinson played his 100th NRL match in Canterbury's 16–12 win at Brookvale Oval. Hodkinson played at halfback and was the main goal kicker in all three matches for the New South Wales Blues in the 2015 State of Origin series loss. Hodkinson was subsequently dropped from the NSW side for the 2016 series.

On 6 July 2015, Hodkinson signed a three-year contract with the Newcastle Knights starting in 2016. He finished off his last year with the Bulldogs having played in 18 matches, scoring one try, kicking 47 goals and kicking one field goal. On 15 December, he was named at halfback for the World All Stars team to play the Indigenous All Stars on 16 February 2016.

=== 2016 : Knights Captain in very poor season for the club ===
On 26 February, Hodkinson was announced as one of three co-captains for the Knights alongside Tariq Sims and Jeremy Smith. In round 1 of the 2016 NRL season, he made his club debut for Newcastle against the Gold Coast Titans, playing at halfback and kicking two goals in Newcastle's 12–30 loss at Cbus Super Stadium. In round 11 against the Wests Tigers, he scored his first try for the Newcastle club. During the middle of the season, he was linked to a possible allegiance switch to England for the 2016 Four Nations series. He qualifies for England through his English father. Hodkinson finished his first season with the Newcastle club having played in 23 matches, scoring one try, kicking 47 goals and kicking one field goal.

=== 2017 : Demotion to reserve grade, loss of Newcastle captaincy ===
On 23 February 2017, Hodkinson was named as the sole captain of the Knights for the 2017 season. After Round 7 and with the Knights only notching one win during that period, Hodkinson was demoted to Newcastle's Intrust Super Premiership NSW team with the club going for youngsters Brock Lamb and Jaelen Feeney in the halves but only had one win with them there while as Hodkinson was in reserve grade. Hodkinson would later return in Round 17 against the Wests Tigers where the Knights lost 33–12 at Hunter Stadium. Hodkinson did not receive the captaincy back with Sione Mata'utia and Jamie Buhrer taking over the role until round 25 and 26 after Sione Mata’utia was ruled out for the final two rounds due to concussion. Hodkinson finished the 2017 NRL season with him playing in 17 matches, scoring one try, kicking 46 goals and kicking one field goal for the Newcastle side.

On 11 November 2019, Hodkinson spoke of his time at Newcastle and called it a "toxic environment". Hodkinson also spoke of his displeasure towards former Newcastle head coach Nathan Brown saying "I started the year all right, and I think it might have been early in the season I got brought into the coach’s office and he said to me: 'I want you to go back to NSW Cup and work on your confidence, "I was like: 'Oh, OK' … I think he felt the pressure and had to make a big call, Unfortunately for me, I took the fall for where we were at the time".

Hodkinson explained his situation at the club further saying "I thought I’d go back for a couple of weeks and get my confidence back, which I didn’t really agree with, but two weeks rolls around, nothing said, "Four weeks, six weeks, didn’t hear a thing. Walked past each other, nothing was said. Ten weeks rolled around and I was just going: 'What’s doing here?, In the meantime, there were certain things getting leaked to the media – the local media up there – that I wasn’t too happy about. I know for a fact that it was coming from him".

=== 2018 ===
On 5 February 2018, Hodkinson was released from his final year of his contract with the Newcastle Knights to sign on a one-year deal with the Cronulla-Sutherland Sharks as a back-up half. In round 3 of the 2018 season, he made his debut for Cronulla in their 14–4 win over the Parramatta Eels at ANZ Stadium.

On 15 May, Hodkinson was granted a release from the Cronulla club so he could return to Manly effectively immediately on a two-year contract, with Cronulla allowing him to take up a longer-term deal than they could offer. He made his return to the Manly club in their 24–4 win over the Melbourne Storm at AAMI Park on 19 May. He played off the interchange bench and kicked three from four goals in the match.

=== 2019 ===
Hodkinson started the 2019 season at Manly from the bench in the match against West Tigers. He entered the game as a substitute during the second half at hooker, and had an error-free 15 minutes on the field. After Manly's round 2 loss against the Sydney Roosters, Hodkinson was demoted to reserve grade to play for Manly's reserve grade side the Blacktown Workers Sea Eagles.

On 5 September, Hodkinson announced his retirement from rugby league after succumbing to career-ending knee injuries. Hodkinson spoke to the media saying "Unfortunately due to a new injury sustained earlier this year, numerous medical procedures and intensive rehabilitation, I have been forced to give up the game that I love and will be medically retiring from rugby league".

Sporting positions
Preceded by Kurt Gidley	Newcastle Knights co-captain (with Jeremy Smith and Tariq Sims); 2016	Succeeded by Trent Hodkinson
Preceded by Trent Hodkinson, Jeremy Smith and Tariq Sims	Newcastle Knights captain 2017 (until round 7)	Succeeded by Jamie Buhrer and Sione Mata'utia
