= Uiti Baker =

Cook Islands international rugby league footballer (born 1992)

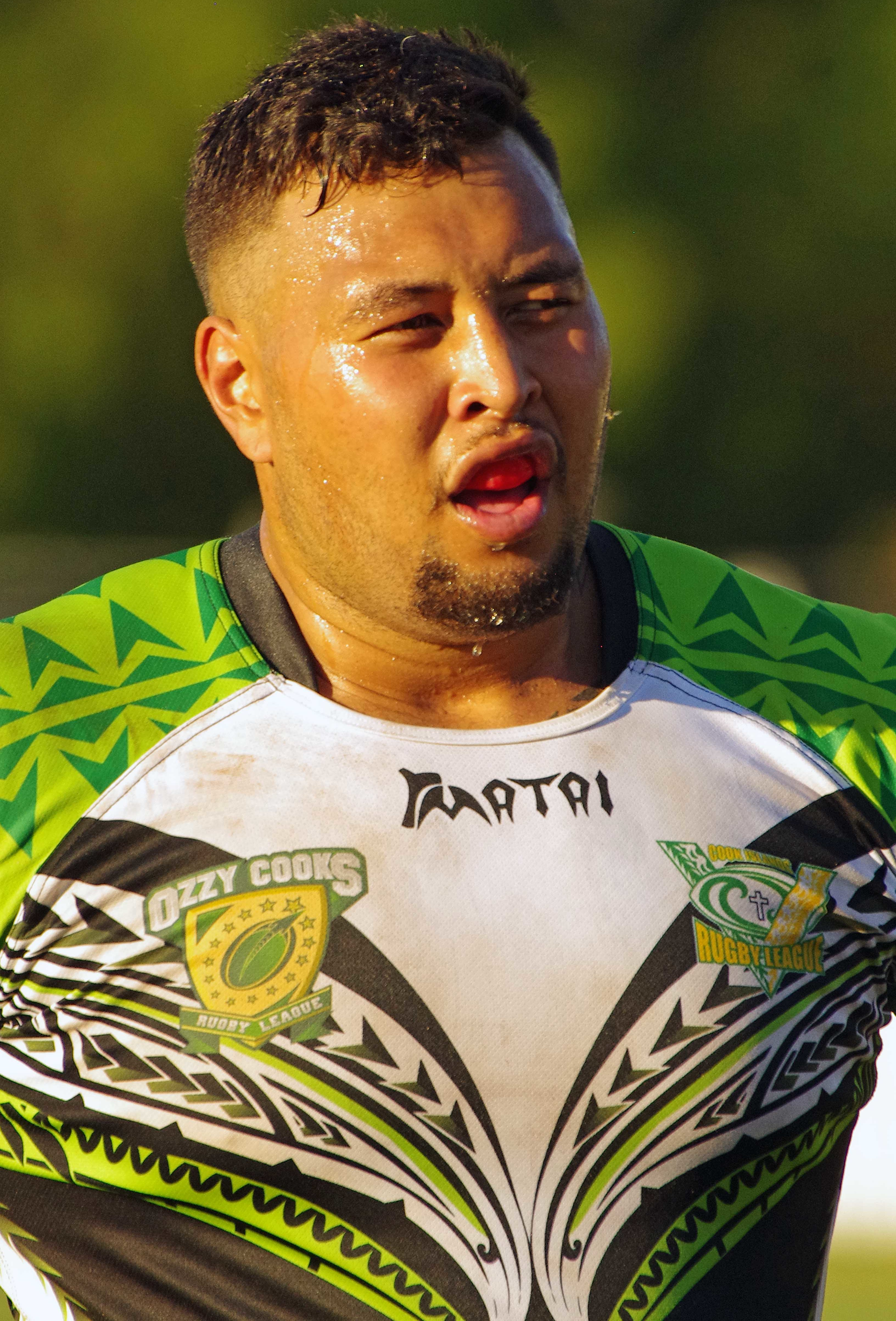

Personal information
- Born: 2 September 1992 (age 33) Wellington, New Zealand
- Height: 192 cm (6 ft 4 in)
- Weight: 120 kg (18 st 13 lb)

Playing information
- Position: Prop
Representative
Years	Team	Pld	T	G	FG	P
2015–17	Cook Islands	3	1	0	0	4
- Source: As of 20 February 2018

Uiti Baker (born 2 September 1992) is a Cook Islands international rugby league footballer who plays as a prop for the Souths Logan Magpies in the Queensland Cup.

== Background ==
Baker was born in Wellington, New Zealand. He is of Samoan, Tokelau and Cook Island descent.

== Playing career ==
He is a Cook Islands international.

Baker was previously in the systems of the Newcastle Knights, Wests Tigers, Melbourne Storm, Canberra Raiders and the Manly Sea Eagles.
