= Tariq Sims =

Fiji international rugby league footballer

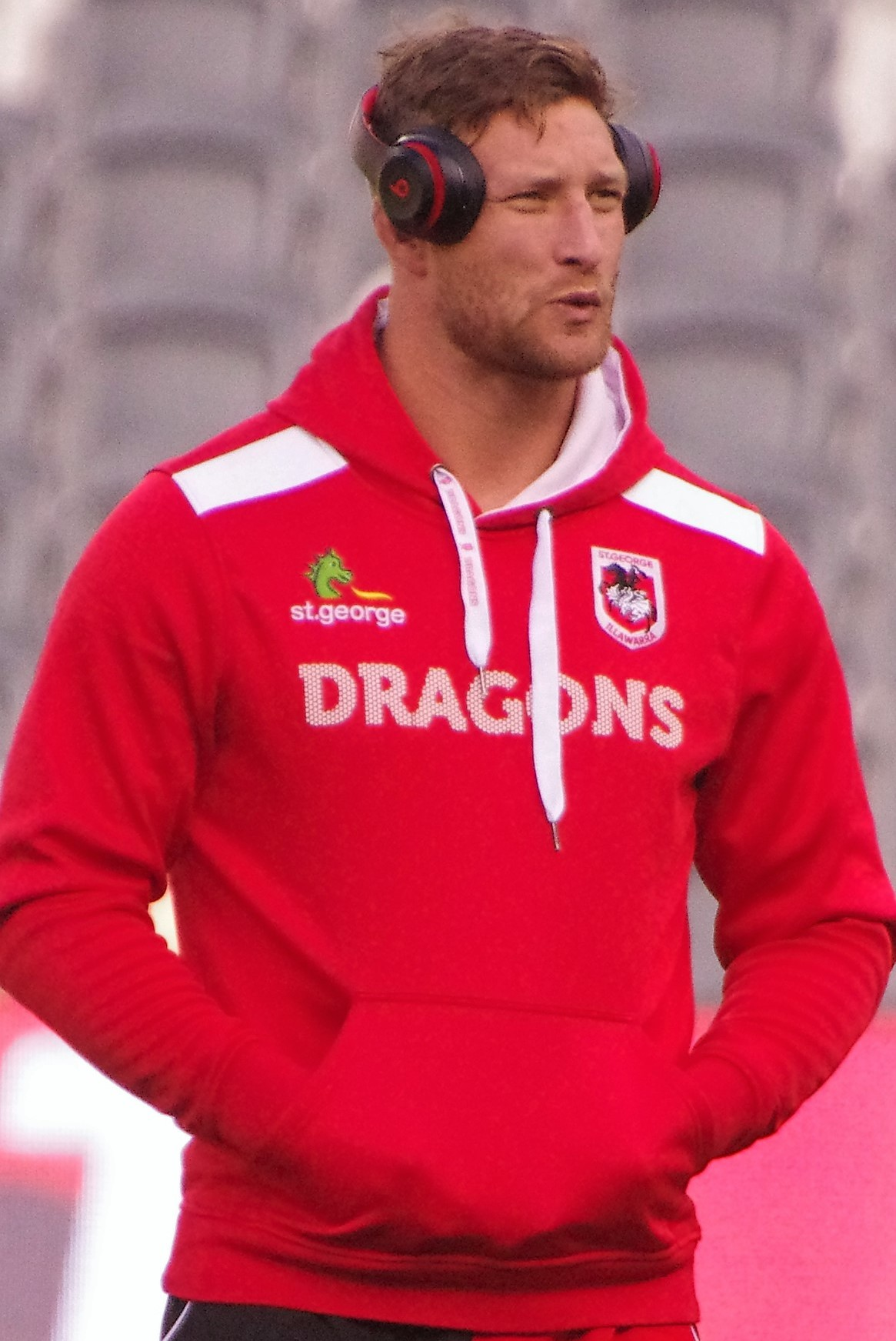

Personal information
- Born: 9 February 1990 (age 36) Gerringong, New South Wales, Australia
- Height: 193 cm (6 ft 4 in)
- Weight: 106 kg (16 st 10 lb)

Playing information
- Position: Second-row, Loose forward
Club
Years	Team	Pld	T	G	FG	P
2011–14	North Qld Cowboys	71	16	0	0	64
2015–16	Newcastle Knights	27	4	0	0	16
2016–22	St. George Illawarra	123	23	0	0	92
2023	Melbourne Storm	15	1	0	0	4
2024–25	Catalans Dragons	41	5	0	0	20
	Total	277	49	0	0	196
Representative
Years	Team	Pld	T	G	FG	P
2012–17	NSW Country	6	3	0	0	12
2013	Fiji	5	1	0	0	4
2018–22	New South Wales	6	0	0	0	0
- Source: As of 26 July 2025
- Relatives: Ashton Sims (brother); Korbin Sims (brother); Ruan Sims (sister); Reagan Campbell-Gillard (cousin)

Tariq Sims (born 9 February 1990) is a Fiji international retired rugby league footballer who played as a Second-row, Loose forward and Prop for the Catalans Dragons in the Super League.

He previously played for the North Queensland Cowboys, Newcastle Knights, St. George Illawarra Dragons and Melbourne Storm in the NRL, and at representative level for New South Wales Country and New South Wales in the State of Origin series.

== Early career ==
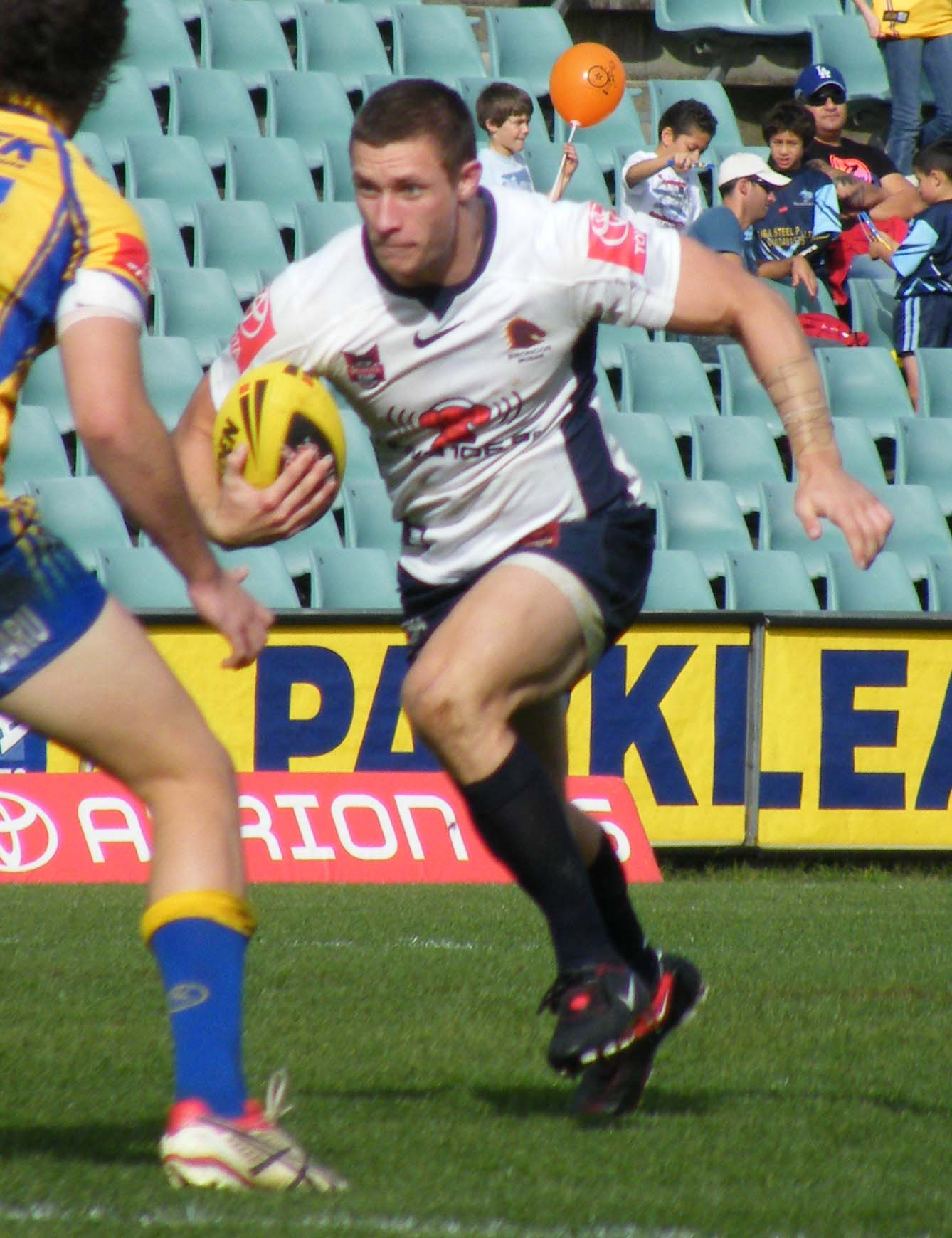
Sims playing for the Brisbane Broncos' NYC team in 2009

Sims was born in Gerringong, New South Wales, Australia. He was educated at Kiama High School.

He played junior football in his home town of Gerringong, New South Wales, before moving to Queensland, where he played in the NYC for the Brisbane Broncos from 2008 to 2010. He was initially a winger, but was told by the Broncos to put on weight and turned into a forward. His brothers, Korbin and Ashton, both played with him at the Broncos at the same time; Ashton was a member of the first-grade squad, while Korbin played NYC with him. Tariq was the 2010 Toyota Cup season's player of the year, but he left the Broncos without playing a first-grade match. He and Ashton joined the North Queensland Cowboys for the 2011 season. Upon leaving the Broncos, he praised the club's youth system for his development as a player, saying that he was leaving only to get the opportunity to play first-grade football.

== Playing career ==
=== 2011–2014: North Queensland Cowboys ===
In round 2 of the 2011 NRL season, Sims made his NRL debut for North Queensland against the Newcastle Knights off the interchange bench in the Cowboys 34–22 loss at 1300SMILES Stadium.

In Sims' next match in round 3 against the Melbourne Storm, he scored his first NRL career try in North Queensland's 34–6 win at 1300SMILES Stadium. In round 13 against the Canberra Raiders at Canberra Stadium, Sims scored a double in the match. One of the tries was the longest try scored by a North Queensland forward by running 45m to score in the Cowboys comeback 40–24 win after trailing 22–0 after 21 minutes of the match. In Round 25 against the Cronulla-Sutherland Sharks, Sims' season ended when he broke his leg in the Cowboys 28–20 win.

Despite his curtailed season, Sims was a finalist in the best rookie and best second-rower categories of the Dally M Awards. During the year, Sims was invited to join the New South Wales State of Origin team during training. Sims finished his stellar debut year in the NRL with him playing in 20 matches and scoring 5 tries. On 8 September 2011, Sims re-signed with North Queensland on a four-year contract to the end of the 2015 season. On 2 November 2011, Sims was shortlisted for the Rugby League International Federation's Second Rower of the Year award.

After breaking his leg early in 2012, Sims returned in Round 5 to play in the Cowboys 22–6 victory over the Canberra Raiders at Canberra Stadium. Sims came off the bench in the second half and put in a memorable performance, performing a big hit on Tom Learoyd-Lahrs in his first few minutes on the field. Sims soon returned to the Cowboys starting line-up.

On 22 April 2012, Sims made his representative debut for NSW Country Origin against NSW City Origin off the interchange bench and scored a double in the 24–22 loss at Mudgee.

Just 7 matches into his comeback from a broken leg, playing against the Penrith Panthers, Sims attempted to save a try but was involved in a freak accident with Penrith back rower Cameron Ciraldo which ended with Sims breaking his leg for a second time in the space of a year and in exactly the same spot as the previous break. The Cowboys went on to win the match 30–28, with Tariq's brother Ashton scoring the match-winning try in the dying minutes of the game.

Sims had a successful surgery which involved a steel rod being inserted into his leg to help with the healing process and to stop another break. He returned to full contact training in the week of the Cowboys' semi-final loss to the Manly Warringah Sea Eagles. Sims played in 7 matches and scored 1 try in 2012. On 21 December, Sims was taken to hospital after suffering from dehydration at North Queensland's off season army-style boot camp at Lavarack Barracks.

In 2013, Sims made his second return from injury in a 28–24 trial victory over his former club Brisbane Broncos on 4 February. He started the match in the second row and had three stints in the game. Impressing coaching staff and full of confidence.

On 21 April, Sims played for NSW Country Origin against NSW City Origin off the interchange bench in the 18–12 win at Coffs Harbour. Sims finished the season with 4 tries from 23 matches.

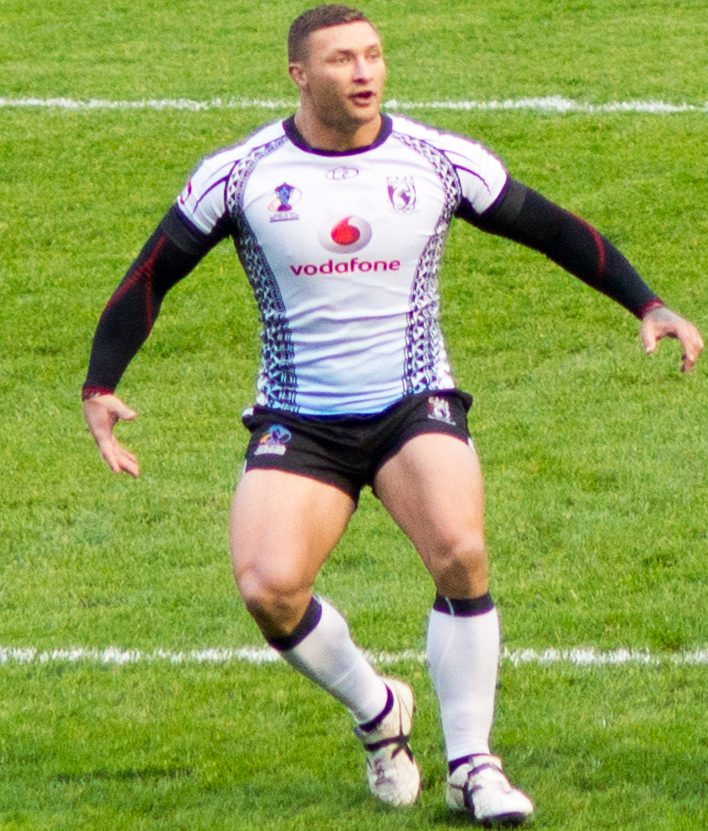
Sims playing for Fiji in 2013

Qualifying through his mother, Sims was selected in the Fiji squad for the 2013 Rugby League World Cup alongside his brothers, Ashton and Korbin. He made his international debut for Fiji against Ireland at second-row and scored a try in the 32–14 win at Spotland Stadium. Sims played in 5 matches and scored 1 try in the tournament.

On 4 May 2014, Sims played prop for NSW Country Origin in the 26–26 draw at Dubbo. On 4 July, Sims signed a two-year contract with the Newcastle Knights starting in 2015, where he would join his younger brother Korbin Sims.

On 16 September 2014, Sims missed the rest of the NRL finals series after making a guilty plea for a grade three shoulder charge offence for a second-half incident with Brisbane Broncos fullback Justin Hodges in North Queensland's 32–20 victory in Week 1 of the elimination finals at 1300SMILES Stadium. That match was Sims' last for the Cowboys. The Cowboys were later eliminated in Week 2 by the Sydney Roosters. Sims scored 6 tries in 21 matches in 2014.

=== 2015–2016: Newcastle Knights ===
In round 5 of the 2015 season, Sims made his club debut for the Newcastle Knights against the St. George Illawarra Dragons at second-row in the Knights 13–0 loss at Hunter Stadium. On 3 May, Sims played for NSW Country off the interchange bench and scored a try in the 34–22 win at Wagga Wagga.

Sims scored his first club try for the Knights in the 30–10 loss to the Manly-Warringah Sea Eagles, Brookvale Oval in Round 9, 2016. On 12 June, Sims was called into the New South Wales Blues squad as cover, being named as 19th man for Game 2 of the 2015 State of Origin series after Dragons forward Tyson Frizell was ruled out from injury. Brother Korbin was named as 20th man for Queensland two days beforehand. Sims finished his first year with the Knights with him playing in 19 matches and scoring 4 tries, as the club collected the wooden spoon.

On 13 January, Sims was named in the emerging New South Wales Blues squad. In February, he co-captained the Knights in the 2016 NRL Auckland Nines. On 26 February, he was announced as one of three co-captains for the Knights alongside Trent Hodkinson and Jeremy Smith. On 8 May, for the fifth year in a row, he played for New South Wales Country against New South Wales City. On 31 May, he signed a 3-year contract with the St. George Illawarra Dragons starting in 2017. However, after negotiating over the next month, he was released early to the Dragons mid-season. He played in 8 matches for the Knights that season before the mid-season switch.

=== 2016–2022: St George Illawarra Dragons ===
In round 15 of the 2016 season, he made his club debut for St. George Illawarra against the Melbourne Storm, where he played off the interchange bench in the Dragons' 20–10 win at WIN Stadium.

In 2017, Sims was part of the St. George Illawarra side which finished 9th in the 2017 NRL season despite being in the top 8 for most of the season. A disastrous run of form, culminating in a heart breaking round 26 loss to Canterbury which allowed North Queensland to overtake them into 8th spot, saw them miss out on the finals.

In 2018, Sims was selected as part of The NSW Blues squad for the 2018 State of Origin series. Sims did not feature in the first two games of the series for The Blues but was called into the side for the dead rubber game 3 match in Brisbane. Sims was part of the St George Illawarra side which qualified for the finals in 2018. In week one of the finals, St George Illawarra faced a highly fancied Brisbane side at Suncorp Stadium with not many experts predicting an upset. St George Illawarra ended up surprising many as they won the match 48–18 with Sims scoring 3 tries. The following week, Sims was taken from the field with a knee injury as St George Illawarra were eliminated from the finals series losing 13–12 to South Sydney.

Sims was selected for New South Wales in Game 2 of the 2019 State of Origin series which New South Wales won 38–6 at the new Perth Stadium. In round 21 of the 2019 NRL season, Sims scored 2 tries as St George Illawarra defeated the Gold Coast 40–28 at Kogarah Oval.

On 12 August, Sims was ruled out for the rest of the season after having groin surgery. Sims had been battling the groin injury for most of the year but decided to undergo surgery as St George Illawarra had been ruled out of finals contention.

He made a total of 9 appearances for St. George Illawarra in the 2020 NRL season as the side finished a disappointing 13th on the table.

In round 4 of the 2021 NRL season, Sims put in a man of the match performance scoring two tries in his side's 22–13 victory over Newcastle.

On 30 May, Sims was selected for game one of the 2021 State of Origin series. He played in all three games as New South Wales won the series 2–1.

Sims played a total of 21 matches for St. George Illawarra in the 2021 NRL season as the club finished 11th on the table and missed out on the finals.

On 22 April, it was announced Sims would join Melbourne in 2023 on a one-year deal. On 29 May, Sims was selected by New South Wales to play in game one of the 2022 State of Origin series. On 19 June, Sims was not selected for the second game of the series after New South Wales lost the opening match 16–10.

In round 17 of the 2022 NRL season, Sims was sin binned twice in 25 minutes during the clubs 32–18 loss against Brisbane. In round 21, Sims was sent to the sin bin for a dangerous high tackle where he knocked out Cronulla's Connor Tracey during St. George Illawarra's 24–18 loss. Sims was later suspended for four matches over the tackle which ended his playing time at St. George Illawarra.

=== Melbourne Storm ===
Sims played 15 games for Melbourne in the 2023 NRL season as the club finished third on the table. Sims played in Melbourne's preliminary final loss against Penrith.

=== Catalans Dragons ===
On 28 August 2023, Sims signed a two-year deal to join Super League side the Catalans Dragons. Sims made his club debut for Catalans in round 1 of the 2024 Super League season against Warrington. The following week, he scored two tries for Catalans in their 34-0 victory over the newly promoted London Broncos side.

On 22 September 2025, Sims officially confirmed his retirement from rugby league.

== Statistics ==
Year	Team	Games	Tries	Pts
2011	North Queensland Cowboys	20	5	20
2012	North Queensland Cowboys	7	1	4
2013	North Queensland Cowboys	23	4	16
2014	North Queensland Cowboys	21	6	14
2015	Newcastle Knights	19	4	16
2016	St George-Illawarra Dragons	16	2	8
2017	St George-Illawarra Dragons	24	3	12
2018	St George-Illawarra Dragons	25	10	40
2019	St George-Illawarra Dragons	19	3	12
2020	St George-Illawarra Dragons	9		
2021	St George-Illawarra Dragons	21	4	16
2022	St George-Illawarra Dragons	17	1	4
2023	Melbourne Storm	13	1	4
2024	Catalans Dragons	22	3	12
2025	Catalans Dragons	13	2	8
	Totals	268	49	196

== Personal life ==
Sims is married to Ashleigh Sims who is a professional boxer. Sims is the older brother of Korbin Sims, who in 2019 joined him at the St George Illawarra club, and the younger brother of Ashton Sims, who plays for the Toronto Wolfpack. His elder sister Ruan Sims currently plays for the Sydney Roosters in the NRL Women's Premiership, while his other sister, Canecia (CJ) has previously played American football (gridiron) for the Gold Coast Stingrays, but in 2019 signed with the Tweed Heads Seagulls rugby league club.
