= Lakes United =

Australian rugby league club, based in Newcastle, NSW

- Seagull

Club information
- Full name: Lakes United Rugby League Football Club
- Colours: Blue; Gold
- Founded: 1947; 79 years ago
- Website: https://web.archive.org/web/20090909152059/http://www.lakesunitedrlfc.com.au/

Current details
- Ground: Cahill Oval, Belmont NSW
- Competition: Newcastle Rugby League

Records
- Premierships: 11 (1947, 1974, 1975, 1985, 1986, 1987, 1996, 2001, 2006, 2007, 2015)

Lakes United is a rugby league club based in the Newcastle, New South Wales region of Australia.

Known as The Seagulls and wearing royal blue and gold, they have been a member of the Newcastle Rugby League since 1947.

== History ==
Lakes United were successful in their first year in the Newcastle competition winning the competition in 1947. It had players selected to represent Newcastle and the Country Rugby League. The Central Coast Division of Country Rugby League was part of Lake United's junior division in 1947 and subsequent years before expanding.

Allan Thomson was selected to play for the Australian national rugby league team while playing for the club in tests against New Zealand during 1967 and France in 1968. Thomson was also selected for a Kangaroo tour in 1968 where tour manager Ken Arthurson signed him to play for the Manly-Warringah Sea Eagles in the New South Wales Rugby League competition.

Thomson returned to play for Lakes United in 1973. The club then won two premierships in the Newcastle competition in 1974 and 1975. The club won three premierships in a row in the mid-1980s when a young Paul Harragon played for the club. Harragon joined the Newcastle Knights in their first year in the NSW Rugby League competition and went on to represent Australia. Brett Kimmorley was a Lakes United junior and made the Australian schoolboys side before going on a successful career in the National Rugby League including playing for Australia. Lakes United won the Newcastle premiership in 1996 and 2001. In 2006, they won another Newcastle premiership with four players being selected in a Newcastle team to play Great Britain in a practice match for the 2006 Rugby League Tri-Nations.

== Premiership titles ==
Years Won
1947	1974	1975	1985	1986	1987	1996	2001	2006	2007	2015

== Notable Juniors ==
- Albert Paul (1948-57 Newtown Bluebags, Newcastle, Canterbury-Bankstown Berries)
- Allan Thomson (1969-72 Manly-Warringah Sea Eagles)

Simon Booth (1977-1980 Manly Warringah Sea Eagles) Michael Pitman (1980-1981) Newtown Jets (1982-1983 Canterbury Bulldogs ) Trevor Tuckwell South Sydney Rabbitohs (1986-1989) Rick Stone South Sydney Rabbitohs (1988-1989) Steve Stone South Sydney Rabbitohs (1988-1989) Canberra Raiders (1990-1996) Steve Walters Newcastle Knights (1988-1990)

- Paul Harragon (1988-99 Newcastle Knights)
- Adam Muir (1990-02 Newcastle Knights, North Sydney Bears, Northern Eagles & South Sydney Rabbitohs)
- Robbie Ross (1994-03 Newcastle Knights, Brisbane Broncos, Hunter Mariners & Melbourne Storm)
- Brett Kimmorley (1995-10 Newcastle Knights, Hunter Mariners, Melbourne Storm, Northern Eagles, Cronulla Sharks & Canterbury Bulldogs)
- Craig Kimmorley (1995-99 Newcastle Knights, Hunter Mariners, Adelaide Rams & Sydney Roosters)
- Troy Fletcher (1996-01 Newcastle Knights)
- Brock Mueller (1998-02 Newcastle Knights & Villeneuve Leopards)
- Willie Mason (2001-15 Canterbury-Bankstown Bulldogs, Sydney Roosters, North Queensland Cowboys, Newcastle Knights, Manly-Warringah Sea Eagles & Catalans Dragons)
- Matt Kennedy (2003-05 Newcastle Knights)
- Blake Mueller (2003-05 Newcastle Knights)
- Michael Young (2004-08 Newcastle Knights)
- Kade Snowden (2005- Newcastle Knights & Cronulla-Sutherland Sharks)
- Josh Jackson (2012- Canterbury-Bankstown Bulldogs)
- Cory Denniss (2016- Newcastle Knights)
- Dylan Phythian (2016- Newcastle Knights)
- Sam Stone (2017- Newcastle Knights)

Phoenix Crossaland 2019 - Newcastle Knights

Tim Patterson- Newcastle Knights 1991-1993, Gold Coast - 1994-1995, Sydney Tigers 1996-1997, Parramatta Eels 1999-2000
