= Will Pearsall =

Australian rugby league footballer

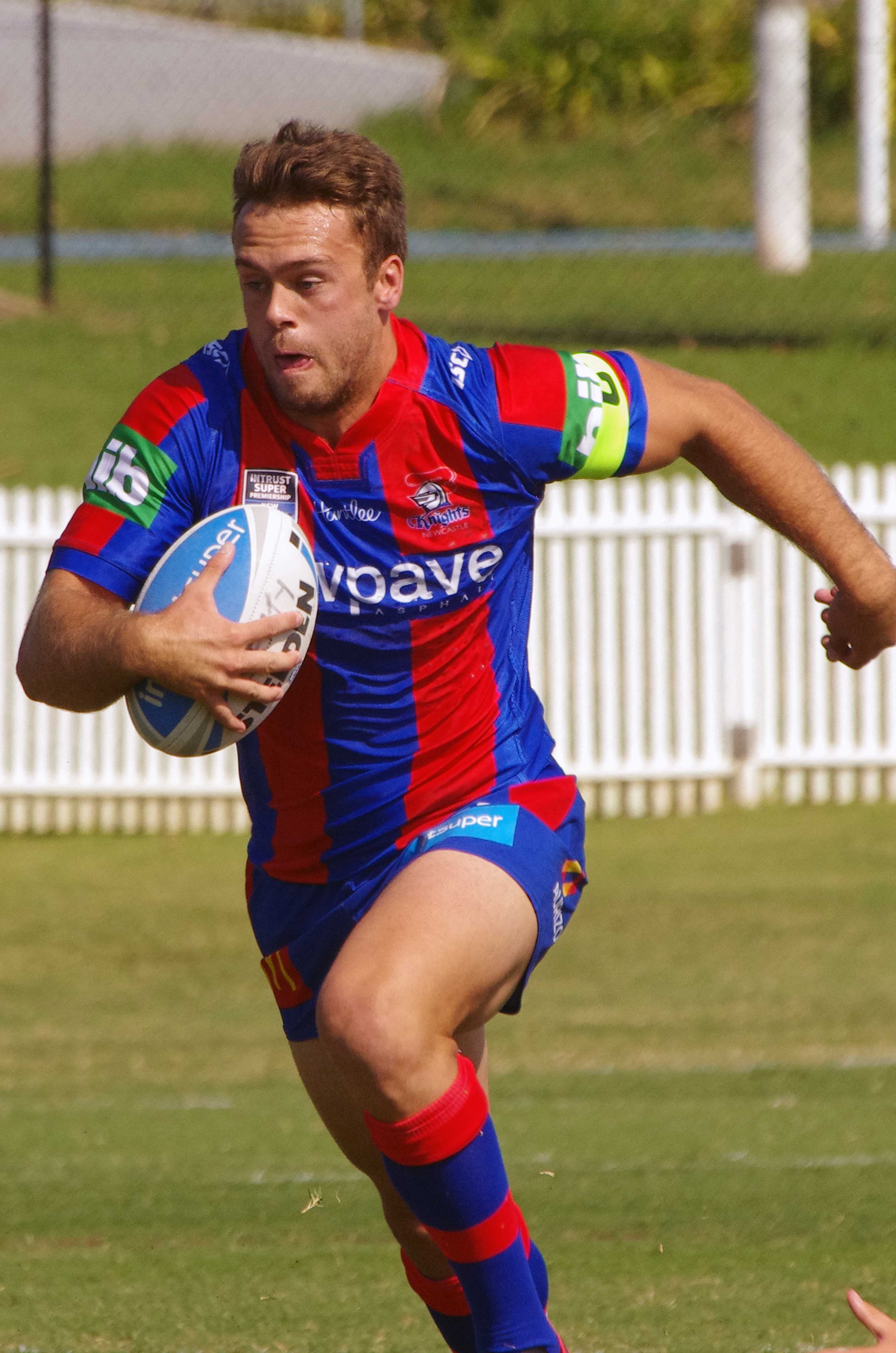
- Pearsall playing for the Knights in 2016.

Personal information
- Full name: William Pearsall
- Born: 12 March 1995 (age 30) Young, New South Wales, Australia
- Height: 189 cm (6 ft 2 in)
- Weight: 88 kg (13 st 12 lb)

Playing information
- Position: Five-eighth, Halfback
Club
Years	Team	Pld	T	G	FG	P
2016	Newcastle Knights	3	0	0	0	0
- Source: As of 30 April 2016

Will Pearsall (born 12 March 1995) is an Australian former professional rugby league footballer. He played for the Newcastle Knights in the National Rugby League as a five-eighth and halfback.

== Background ==
Born in Young, New South Wales, Pearsall played his junior rugby league for The Entrance Tigers, before being signed by the Manly Warringah Sea Eagles.

== Playing career ==
=== Early career ===
From 2012 to 2015, Pearsall played for the Manly Warringah Sea Eagles' NYC team. In 2015, he captained the side. In October 2015, he signed a two-year contract with the Newcastle Knights starting in 2016.

=== 2016 ===
In round 6 of the 2016 NRL season, Pearsall made his NRL debut for Newcastle against the Wests Tigers.

=== 2017 ===
After failing to play another NRL game for Newcastle in 2017, Pearsall left the club after not being offered a new contract beyond 2017. He decided to leave the game in favour of full-time employment on the Central Coast.
