= Western Suburbs Rosellas =

Australian semi professional rugby league club, based in Newcastle, NSW

- Rosella

Club information
- Full name: Western Suburbs Rugby League Football Club
- Colours: Green; Red; Black; White
- Founded: 1910; 116 years ago
- Website: http://www.westrosellas.com.au

Current details
- Ground: Harker Oval, New Lambton NSW
- Competition: Newcastle Rugby League

The Western Suburbs Rosellas, Western Suburbs, Wests, The Rosellas are a Rugby league club based in the Newcastle, NSW region of Australia. It was a foundation member of the Newcastle Rugby League in 1909 and has been one of the most successful teams in that competition. The club has had a number of players represent Australia including Wally Prigg, a member of the Australian Rugby League Hall of Fame. Johnny Raper, another member of the Australian Rugby League Hall of Fame played for Wests after he finished playing for the St. George Dragons.

== History ==
=== Early years ===
A strike in 1909 hastened the conversion to the professional code and the club was formed in New Lambton, though no Rebels players had joined. Playing in red and green, their first match was on 14 May 1910 where they lost to South Newcastle 18–0. They withdrew from the competition midyear.

The club has been known as the Rosellas since at least 1915, where it is recorded in a report on a challenge match where they as champions played Balmain as champions of the Sydney premiership that year and won 35–5.

=== The 1990s- ===
The club has had a successful leagues club making an attractive sponsor of rugby league in the national rugby league. Despite attempts by the Newcastle Knights to gain sponsorship from the Wests Leagues Club, in 1995, the club was going to be the majority owner of the Hunter Mariners in the Super League competition until a majority of members of the club made it clear that they would not support a team in the Super League competing against the Knights in August 1995. Bob Ferris, the General Manager of Western Suburbs, left shortly after to manage the Mariners. In December 2005 the Wests Leagues Club, entered into an arrangement with the Newcastle Knights to secure their future as a member of the National Rugby League.

Wests Football Club has also supplied a number of players for the Knights most notably NSW and Australian player Matthew Gidley, current players Kurt Gidley, Jarrod Mullen and former Knights player Luke Walsh.

== West Song ==
The team song for the Rosellas is "Oh have you ever seen a better football team than the one that plays for West, They come from miles away just to see us play for they say that West is best, The Western Suburbs boys fill the crowd with joy - they're the best you've ever seen, So you'd better come along when you hear this song and see the boys in the red and green."

== Premiership titles ==
Years Won
1912	1915	1916	1922	1961	1966	1970	1978	1980	1981	1982	1984	1992	1997	1998	1999	2002	2004	2008	2012	2013	2014	2019

== International representatives ==
- Wally Prigg (Australia 1929)
- Keith Froome (Australia 1948)
- Col Maxwell (Australia 1948)
- Ian Johnston (Australia 1949)
- Johnny Raper (Australia 1959)
- Allan Buman (Australia 1965)
- John Cootes (Australia 1969)
- Ken Maddison (Australia 1973)
- Matthew Gidley (Australia 1999)
- Anthony Tupou (Australia 2006)
- Kurt Gidley (Australia 2007)

== Notable Juniors ==
- Ben Simmons (2016/17 - Philadelphia 76ers) (NBA)
- Jarrod Mullen (2005-16 Newcastle Knights)
- Nathan Hinton (2006-07 Newcastle Knights)
- Ben Farrar (2007-15 North Queensland Cowboys, Manly-Warringah Sea Eagles, Catalans Dragons & London Broncos)
- Tyrone Roberts (2011-22 Newcastle Knights)
- Mitch Garbutt (2013- Melbourne Storm & Brisbane Broncos)
- Will Smith (2014- Penrith Panthers)
- Chad Redman (2015- Newcastle Knights)
- Dylan Phythian (2016- Newcastle Knights)
- Luke Yates (2017- Newcastle Knights)
- Angelo Piccione ( 2012 -2018 )Bollywood dancer
- Dominic De loosass ( 2012 -2018 )stunt double for Danny De Vito
- Savelio tuip’aynell 2018 PB 100m sprint time of 25.69 seconds ( wind assisted )
- Campbell Pike (espy expert)
