= Dylan Phythian =

Australian rugby league footballer

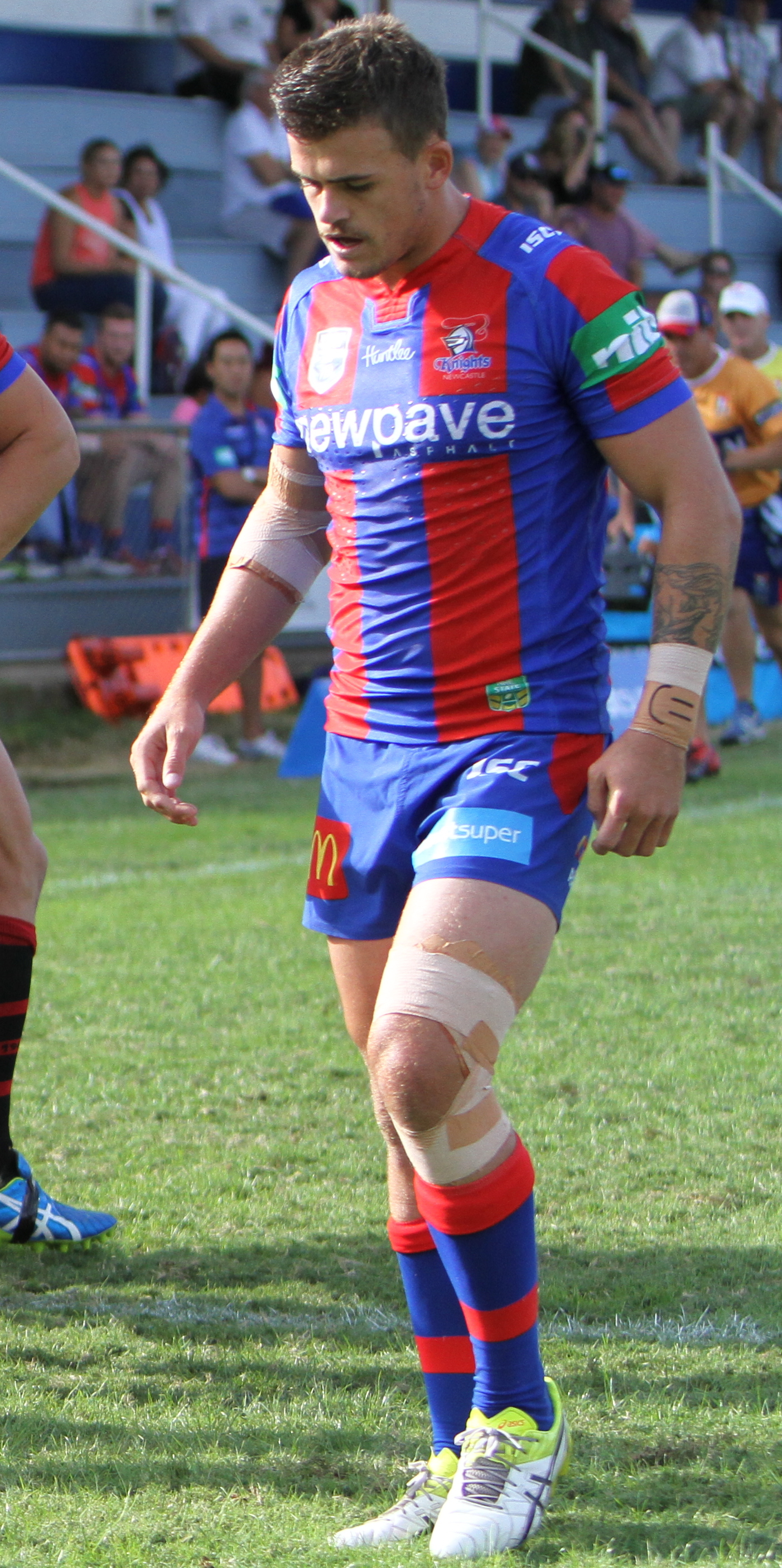

Personal information
- Born: 19 August 1995 (age 31) Newcastle, New South Wales, Australia
- Height: 188 cm (6 ft 2 in)
- Weight: 100 kg (15 st 10 lb)

Playing information
- Position: Fullback, Five-eighth
Club
Years	Team	Pld	T	G	FG	P
2016–17	Newcastle Knights	3	1	0	0	4
- Source: As of 5 November 2022

Dylan Phythian (born 19 August 1995) is an Australian professional rugby league footballer who plays as a fullback and five-eighth. He previously for the Newcastle Knights in the NRL.

== Background ==
Phythian was born in Newcastle, New South Wales, Australia.

He played his junior rugby league for the Western Suburbs Rosellas, Lakes United and Belmont South Rabbitohs, before being signed by the Newcastle Knights.

== Playing career ==
=== 2015 ===
In 2015, Phythian played for the Newcastle Knights' NYC team, before being promoted to their New South Wales Cup team during the year.

=== 2016 ===
In round 25 of the 2016 NRL season, Phythian made his NRL debut for the Knights against the South Sydney Rabbitohs, scoring a try. In November, he re-signed with the Knights on a 1-year contract until the end of 2017.

=== 2017 ===
While playing fullback in round 1 of the 2017 season against the New Zealand Warriors, Phythian suffered a season-ending injury, tearing the anterior cruciate ligament in his left knee. In September, he had his Knights contract extended until the end of 2018.

=== 2018 ===
On 27 March, Phythian had his contract terminated by the Knights after he returned a second positive test for social drugs, the first test remaining anonymous under the NRL's rules, with the second positive test automatically incurring a 12-match suspension.

Phythian made his return to the field in June for Lakes United in the Newcastle Rugby League. Less than a week later, he made a mid-season move to the Burleigh Bears in the Queensland Cup.

=== 2019 ===
In February, Phythian was given the chance to train and trial with the Gold Coast Titans during the pre-season.

In September, Phythian played five-eighth in the 2019 Intrust Super Cup Grand Final defeating Wynnum Manly. He also played in the State Championship Grand Final against the NSW Intrust Super Cup winners Newtown Jets.

=== 2020 ===
In 2020, Phythian played for the Blacktown Workers.

=== 2021 ===
In 2021, Phythian returned to Newcastle to play for the Central Newcastle Butcher Boys in the Newcastle Rugby League.

=== 2022 ===
In 2022, Phythian returned to the Knights on a train and trial contract and played for their NSW Cup team.
