= Cory Denniss =

Australian rugby league player

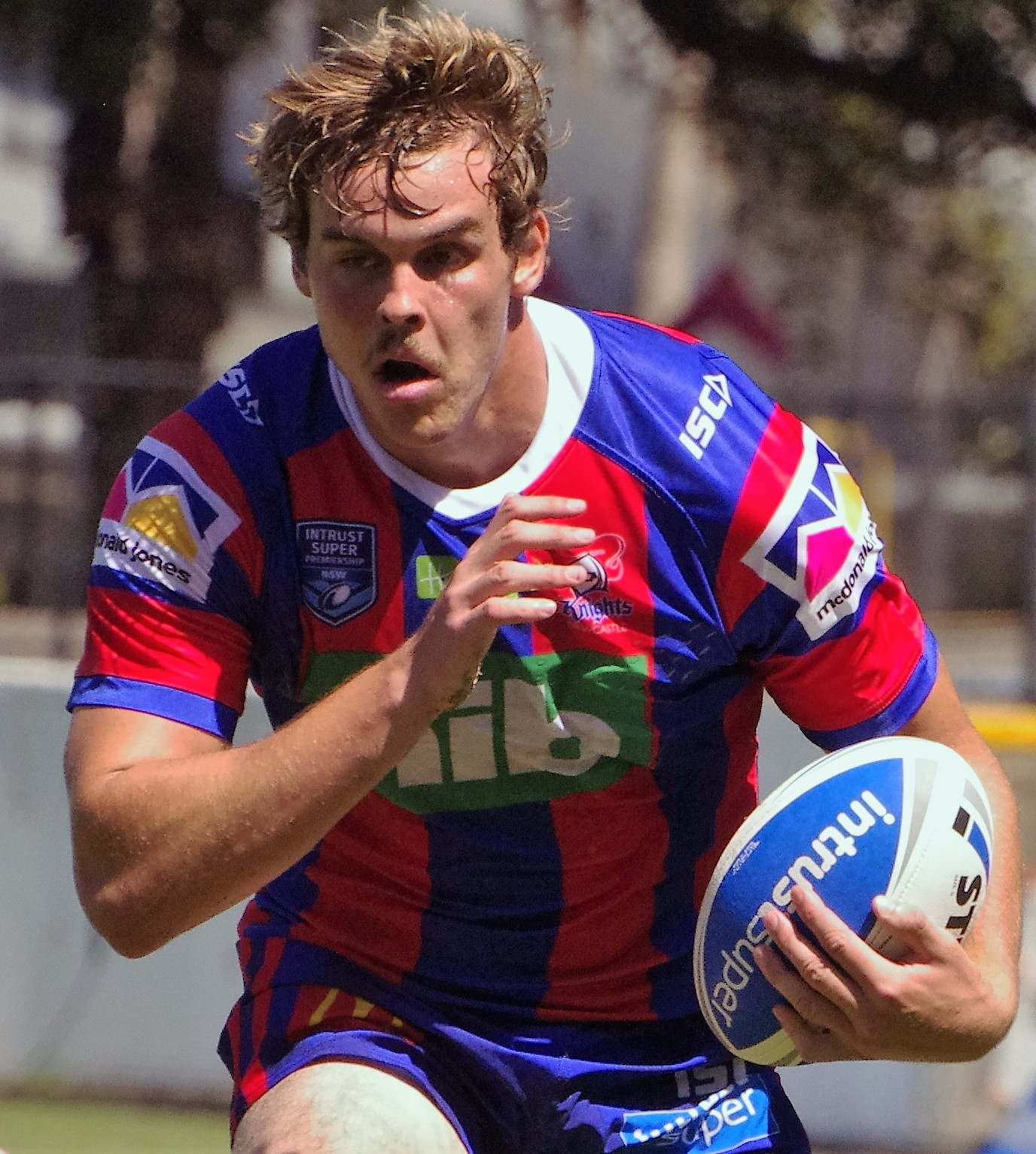

Personal information
- Born: 18 June 1997 (age 29) Belmont, New South Wales, Australia
- Height: 193 cm (6 ft 4 in)
- Weight: 99 kg (15 st 8 lb)

Playing information
- Position: Centre, Wing
Club
Years	Team	Pld	T	G	FG	P
2016–18	Newcastle Knights	18	4	0	0	16
- Source: As of 30 March 2019

Cory Denniss (born 18 June 1997) is an Australian former professional rugby league footballer. His positions are centre and wing.

He previously played for the Newcastle Knights in the National Rugby League.

== Background ==
Denniss was born in Belmont, New South Wales, Australia.

He played his junior rugby league for Lakes United in the Newcastle Rugby League, before being signed by the Newcastle Knights.

== Playing career ==
=== 2016 ===
In 2016, Denniss played for the Newcastle Knights' NYC team. In round 3 of the 2016 NRL season, after just two games in the NYC, he was called up to make his NRL debut for the Knights against the Canberra Raiders after regular winger Akuila Uate was ruled out with injury. He scored two tries on debut. In July, he played for the New South Wales under-20s team against the Queensland under-20s team. He finished his debut season having played in 7 matches and scoring 3 tries. In November, he extended his contract with the Knights until the end of 2018.

=== 2017 ===
2017 was a quieter year for Denniss, spending the entirety of the season in the Knights' lower grade sides.

=== 2018 ===
After spending the first 12 rounds in the Knights' Intrust Super Premiership NSW side, Denniss was called up for a return to the NRL side, playing at centre against the Parramatta Eels in the Knights' 30-4 win. He parted ways with the Knights at the end of the season.

In December, Denniss signed a 2-year contract with the South Sydney Rabbitohs starting in 2019.

=== 2019 & 2020 ===
Denniss made no appearances for South Sydney in the 2019 NRL season and 2020 NRL season's. On 9 November 2020, he was released by South Sydney.
