= Brock Lamb =

Australian rugby league footballer

Personal information
- Full name: Brock Lamb
- Born: 22 January 1997 (age 29) Maitland, New South Wales, Australia
- Height: 181 cm (5 ft 11 in)
- Weight: 90 kg (14 st 2 lb)

Playing information
- Position: Five-eighth, Halfback
Club
Years	Team	Pld	T	G	FG	P
2016–18	Newcastle Knights	32	5	30	1	81
2019	Sydney Roosters	1	0	0	0	0
2019	London Broncos	6	3	0	1	13
	Total	39	8	30	2	94
Representative
Years	Team	Pld	T	G	FG	P
2019	NSW Residents	1	0	2	0	4
- Source: As of 11 January 2024

Brock Lamb (born 22 January 1997) is an Australian former professional rugby league footballer who plays as a stand-off and scrum-half for the Maitland Pickers in the Newcastle Rugby League.

He previously played for the Newcastle Knights and the Sydney Roosters in the NRL, and for the London Broncos in the Super League.

== Background ==
Lamb was born in Maitland, New South Wales, Australia.

He played his junior rugby league for the West Maitland Reddogs, before being signed by the Newcastle Knights.

== Playing career ==
=== Early career ===
From 2014 to 2016, Lamb played for the Newcastle Knights' NYC team. In November and December 2014, he played for the Australian Schoolboys. On 21 January 2015, he signed a 3-year contract with the Knights until the end of the 2017 season.

=== 2016 ===
In round 9 of the 2016 NRL season, Lamb made his NRL debut for the Knights against the Sydney Roosters. In September, he extended his contract with the Knights from the end of 2017 to the end of 2018. He finished his debut year making three appearances as Newcastle finished bottom of the table.

=== 2017 ===
Lamb played 21 games for the Knights during the 2017 season. On 9 July, during a close game against the Canterbury-Bankstown Bulldogs, Newcastle were given a penalty in the final seconds of the game with the score at 20–18 in favour of Canterbury. The first choice goal-kicker Trent Hodkinson handed the ball to Lamb to give his side the chance of sending the game into golden point extra time by kicking the goal. Lamb missed the conversion and Canterbury won the match, after the game Hodkinson was questioned as to why he gave the kick to level the game to Lamb. In the aftermath of the loss, Lamb was mocked on social media for his missed conversion attempt.

Lamb would go on to play 21 games for Newcastle as the club finished last and claimed the Wooden Spoon.

=== 2018 ===
After the additions of halfback Mitchell Pearce and five-eighth Connor Watson to the Knights' side in 2018, Lamb started the year coming off the interchange bench, before eventually being demoted to reserve grade. Lamb only played 8 NRL games for the season before parting ways with the Knights at the end of the year.

=== 2019 ===
Ahead of the 2019 season, Lamb joined the Sydney Roosters. Lamb started the 2019 season playing for the Sydney Roosters feeder club the North Sydney Bears. On 31 March, Lamb kicked a winning 40 metre field goal for North Sydney against the Wentworthville Magpies in the Canterbury Cup NSW as Norths won the match 21–20. On 6 May, Lamb was named in the Canterbury Cup NSW residents team to play against the Queensland residents side.

Lamb made his debut for the Sydney Roosters against his old club Newcastle in Round 11 as a replacement for Cooper Cronk. Newcastle would go on to win the match 38–12.

On 21 July, Lamb scored 2 tries and kicked 4 goals as North Sydney defeated the Blacktown Workers Sea Eagles 28–24 at North Sydney Oval in Round 18 of the Canterbury Cup NSW competition.

On 29 July, Lamb signed a deal with English Super League side the London Broncos until the end of the Super League XXIV season. Lamb made a total of 6 appearances for the London Broncos as they were relegated from the Super League after finishing last on the table.

On 10 December, Lamb signed a two-year deal to join NRL side Parramatta.

=== 2020 ===
On 16 January, Lamb left Parramatta without playing a game and returned to Maitland with the Maitland Pickers.
