= David Bhana =

New Zealand rugby league footballer

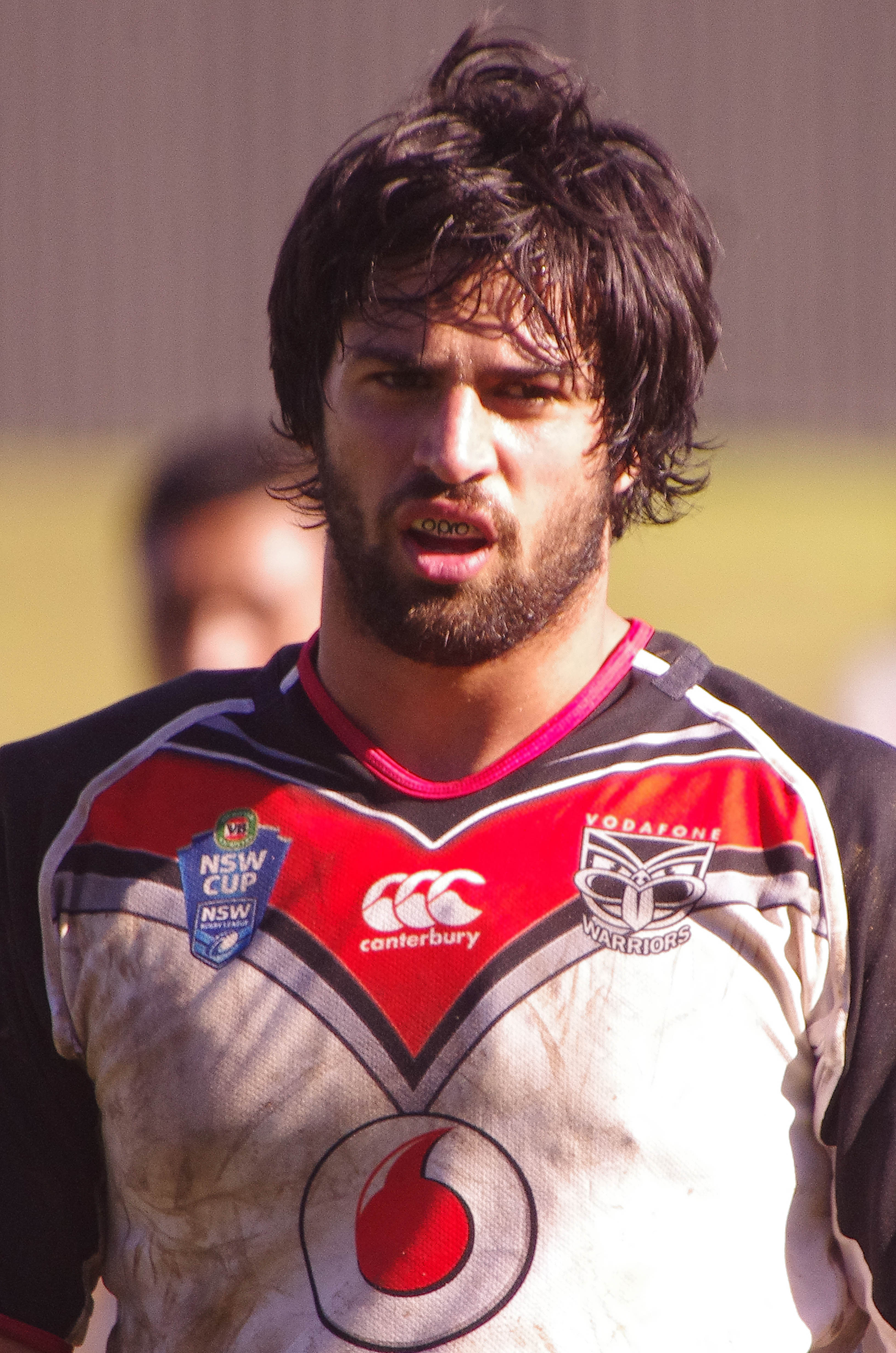
- Bhana playing for the Warriors in 2014.

Personal information
- Born: 10 January 1993 (age 32); Auckland, New Zealand
- Height: 183 cm (6 ft 0 in)
- Weight: 97 kg (15 st 4 lb)

Playing information
- Position: Lock
Club
Years	Team	Pld	T	G	FG	P
2016	Newcastle Knights	7	1	0	0	4
- Source: As of 20 February 2018

David Bhana (born 13 January 1993) is a New Zealand professional rugby league footballer. He plays at lock. He previously played for the Newcastle Knights in the National Rugby League.

== Background ==
Born in Auckland, New Zealand, Bhana is of Indian, and Māori descent and played his junior rugby league for the Northcote Tigers, before being signed by the New Zealand Warriors. He attended Birkenhead College between 2006 and 2010, where he was the Head Boy and continued to play club rugby league, while playing 1st XV for the school. Along with 1st XV, he also represented the school in 1st XI cricket. He then went on to study at the University of Auckland where he was a member of the University of Auckland Māori association, Ngā Tauira Māori. He went on to graduate with a Bachelor of Science majoring in Environmental Science and Geography.

Bhana's family has a long history in the game, with his grandfather, father and his three brothers having played rugby league.

== Playing career ==
=== Early career ===
From 2012 to 2013, Bhana played for the New Zealand Warriors' NYC team. On 13 October 2012, he played for the Junior Kiwis against the Junior Kangaroos. In 2013, he captained the side, including in the 30-42 2013 NYC Grand Final loss to the Penrith Panthers. On 27 August 2013, he was named on the interchange bench in the 2013 NYC Team of the Year. On 13 October 2013, he captained the Junior Kiwis against the Junior Kangaroos, in which the Kiwis went down 26–38. In 2014, he graduated on to the Warriors' New South Wales Cup team. On 3 November 2015, he signed a two-year contract with the Newcastle Knights starting in 2016.

=== 2016 ===
In round 1 of the 2016 NRL season, Bhana made his NRL debut for Newcastle against the Gold Coast Titans.

He was named in the New Zealand Māori squad for a match against the New Zealand Residents on 15 October 2016.

=== 2017 ===
In April, Bhana suffered a severe knee injury while playing for the Novocastrians Intrust Super Premiership NSW team. The injury required multiple surgeries including an anterior cruciate ligament reconstruction, ruling him out for the remainder of the season. The injury prevented him from playing another game for the Novocastrians as he was not offered a new contract beyond 2017.
