= Nathan Brown (rugby league, born 1973) =

Australian RL coach and former professional rugby league footballer

Nathan "Brownie" Brown
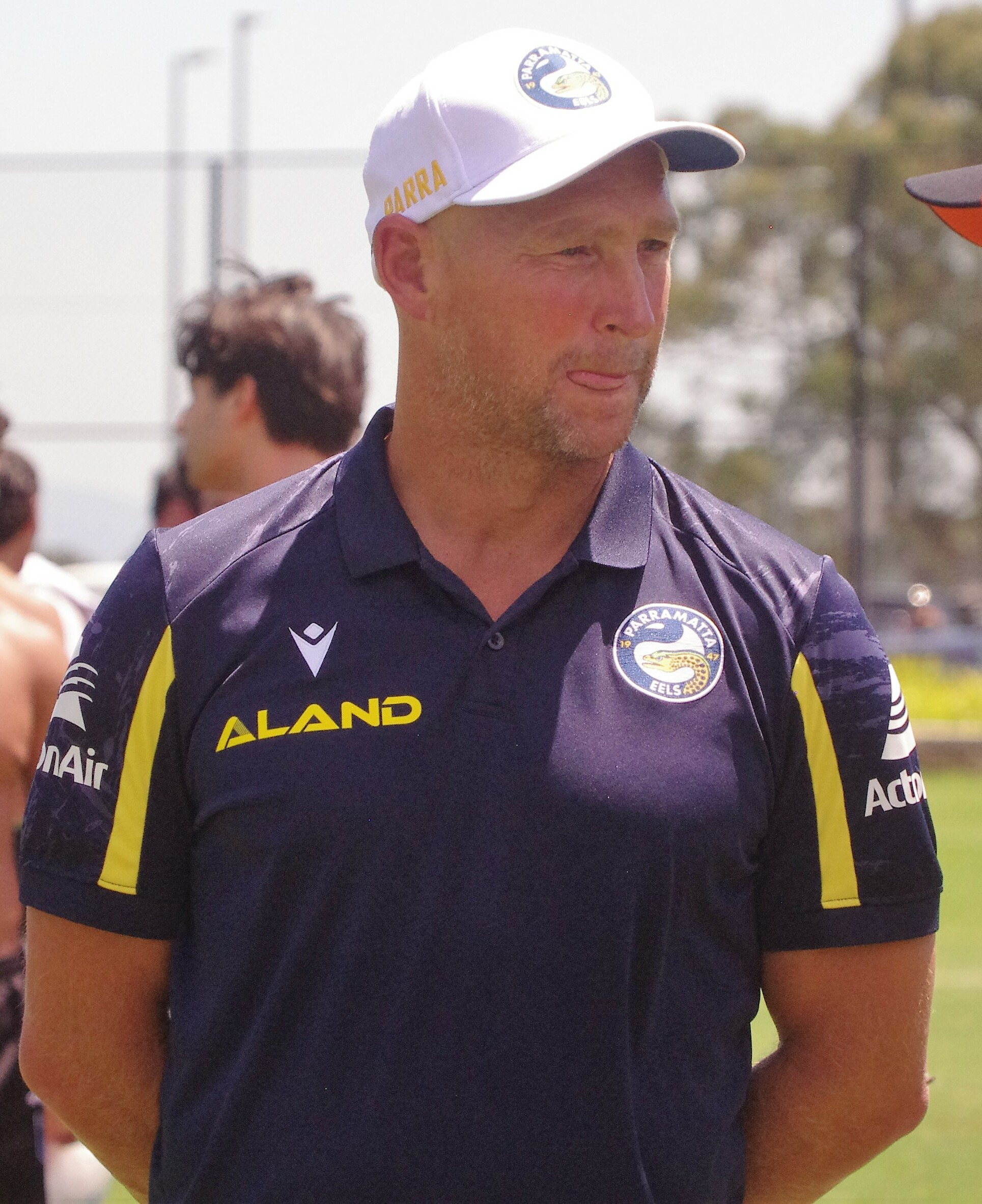

Personal information
- Full name: Nathan Brown
- Born: 31 July 1973 (age 53) Maclean, New South Wales, Australia
- Height: 180 cm (5 ft 11 in)
- Weight: 88 kg (13 st 12 lb)

Playing information
- Position: Hooker
Club
Years	Team	Pld	T	G	FG	P
1993–98	St. George Dragons	120	23	0	0	92
1999–00	St. George Illawarra	52	9	0	0	36
	Total	172	32	0	0	128

Coaching information
Club
Years	Team	Gms	W	D	L	W%
2003–08	St. George Illawarra	151	80	0	71	53
2009–12	Huddersfield Giants	131	76	1	54	58
2013–14	St Helens	62	39	1	22	63
2016–19	Newcastle Knights	94	24	1	69	26
2021–22	New Zealand Warriors	37	12	0	25	32
	Total	475	231	3	241	49
- Source: As of 3 June 2021

Nathan Brown (born 31 July 1973) is an Australian professional rugby league football coach who is the assistant coach of the Parramatta Eels in the NRL and former professional rugby league footballer who played in the 1990s and 2000s.

He played as a hooker for the St. George Dragons and St. George Illawarra Dragons in the National Rugby League, also coaching the latter. He then spent time in the Super League coaching the Huddersfield Giants and St Helens, with whom he won the 2014 Super League Grand Final, before returning to Australia to coach the Newcastle Knights in the NRL.

== Playing career ==
At the end of his debut season Brown played for the St. George Dragons in the 1993 Winfield Cup Grand Final loss to the Brisbane Broncos. He also played for them in the 1996 ARL season grand final loss to the Manly-Warringah Sea Eagles. Brown played for the newly formed St. George Illawarra Dragons at hooker in their 1999 NRL Grand Final loss to the Melbourne Storm. He was forced to retire following a neck injury in a 2001 NRL season trial game.

== Coaching career ==
=== St. George Illawarra Dragons ===
Brown was appointed coach of St. George Illawarra for the 2003 season, becoming the youngest non-playing coach in years in the NRL at age 29. During his first season, at a match on Sunday, 13 April 2003 against Manly at WIN Stadium, a frustrated Nathan Brown berated captain Trent Barrett, Brett Firman and Lance Thompson on the sideline in the 53rd minute with the scores locked up at 12-all. Brown slapped Barrett across the cheek and grabbed the jerseys of Barrett and Thompson. The incident was seen by the crowd and other players on the big screen and proved a decisive turning point as Manly ran in five second half tries to win 38–12. After the match, Brown was apologetic to Barrett and was later fined $5,000 by the NRL.

On 19 July 2005, Brown was fined $10,000 by the NRL after claiming that referees are biased against St George Illawarra. Brown made the comments after his team were penalised 9–3 by the referees. Despite the penalty count, St. George Illawarra still managed to defeat Manly 36–10.

After finishing second in the 2005 competition, Brown's team lost the preliminary final to the eventual premiers, Wests Tigers. Following many injuries and team losses throughout the 2007 season, he was under pressure to keep his job heading into the 2008 season.

On 1 April 2008, it was announced that Brown would not coach St. George Illawarra in the 2009 season, which ended an association with the club that stretches back to the start of the joint venture. He was replaced by Wayne Bennett. on 18 July 2008 it was announced that Brown had signed a 3-year deal with Super League club, Huddersfield, the same club Tigers superstar Brett Hodgson joined.

=== Huddersfield Giants ===
In his first season at Huddersfield he took the team to the 2009 Challenge Cup final.

=== St Helens ===
He left Huddersfield at the end of the 2012 season to take control of St Helens. In his first season as coach, Brown guided St Helens to 5th place in Super League. However, they were defeated 11–10 by Leeds Rhinos in the play-offs stage of the competition.

In his second season, Brown guided St Helens to 1st place in Super League and victory in the Grand Final, after defeating the Wigan Warriors 14–6 at Old Trafford.

Brown's side playing against a 12-man team for 78 minutes, after Warriors prop Ben Flower was sent off for punching Lance Hohaia in the second minute of the match. In October 2014, it was announced that Brown would leave the club to return to his native Australia, citing 'family reasons'.

=== Melbourne Storm ===
In February 2015, the Melbourne Storm announced that Brown had joined the club as a "coaching consultant". Based in Sydney, Brown worked on scouting assignments and provided specialist coaching for the club's hookers. On 9 September 2015, Brown signed a 3-year contract to coach the Newcastle Knights.

=== Newcastle Knights ===
The 2016 NRL season was Brown's first as head coach of the Newcastle Knights. In his first two seasons at Newcastle, Brown's side collected back to back wooden spoons, finishing last on the ladder. In 2018, after Newcastle defeated Brisbane, Brown claimed at the press conference that Brisbane coach Wayne Bennett was to blame for Newcastle's problems over the last few seasons. He went on to say "I just don’t think he needs to behave like that myself but the reality is when Wayne came to town if he thought with his big head rather than his little head, I wouldn’t have had to rebuild the joint,’’. Brown went on to apologize for his remarks a few days later.

In June 2018, Brown signed an open ended performance based contract with Newcastle and no set term but a payout agreement should the contract end.

In the 2019 season, the Newcastle club won their first game, lost their next five, then won five, before going back on a five-game losing streak. This prompted discussions between Brown and club CEO Phillip Gardner, resulting in a mutual agreement that Brown would not coach the Newcastle club in 2020, but would stay on until the end of the season. However, on 27 August, the Newcastle side announced that Brown would depart the club effective immediately.

=== New Zealand Warriors ===
On 7 August 2020, Brown was named as the new head coach of the New Zealand Warriors on a three-year deal. In Brown's first season in charge, the club finished 12th on the table and missed the finals.

In round 7 of the 2022 NRL season, New Zealand suffered their heaviest ever defeat losing 70-10 against Melbourne at AAMI Park. On 7 June 2022, Brown quit as head coach of the New Zealand club. Brown and the Warriors agreed to part ways immediately after he informed the club he would not be able to relocate his family to New Zealand for the long-term. Brown left the club sitting 14th on the table having lost their previous five games. Brown then confirmed to the media on the same day that his head coaching days were over. Brown went on to say "I spoke to my family and my head coaching days are finished. I told them I am not going to appear at another club. I said, you decide whether you want me to stay for the rest of this year or not, but my head coaching days are over. I’m going into another field in rugby league and I’m going to honour my word what I said to those blokes".

=== Parramatta Eels ===
In 2022, Brown joined Parramatta as the clubs elite pathways coaching director. On 21 November 2023, Brown stepped down from his role. In November 2024, Brown re-joined Parramatta signing on to be the assistant head coach ahead of the 2025 NRL season.
