= 2015 Newcastle Knights season =

- NRL Rank: 16th (last)
- 2015 record: Wins: 8; losses: 16
- Points scored: For: 458; against: 612

Team information
- CEO: Matthew Gidley
- Coach: Rick Stone then Danny Buderus (interim)
- Captain: Kurt Gidley
- Stadium: Hunter Stadium
- Avg. attendance: 15,891
- High attendance: 23,604

Top scorers
- Tries: Akuila Uate (12)
- Goals: Tyrone Roberts (54)
- Points: Tyrone Roberts (120)
| ← 2014 | 2016 → |

The 2015 Newcastle Knights season was the 28th in the club's history. Coached by Rick Stone, interim coached by Danny Buderus after Stone's contract was terminated, and captained by Kurt Gidley, they competed in the NRL's 2015 Telstra Premiership, finishing the regular season in 16th place (out of 16).

== Milestones ==
- Round 1: James McManus played his 150th for the club, which was also his 150th career game.
- Round 1: Tyler Randell scored his 1st career try and kicked his 1st career goal.
- Round 1: Beau Scott captained his 1st game for the club.
- Round 1: Jack Stockwell made his debut for the club, after previously playing for the St. George Illawarra Dragons.
- Round 2: Akuila Uate scored his 57th try at Hunter Stadium, breaking Adam MacDougall's record of 56 tries as the highest ever try-scorer at Hunter Stadium.
- Round 3: Chris Houston scored his 100th point for the club, which was also his 100th career point.
- Round 5: Tariq Sims made his debut for the club, after previously playing for the North Queensland Cowboys.
- Round 6: Akuila Uate scored his 100th career try, which was also his 100th for the club, becoming the 1st Knight to do so.
- Round 7: Dane Gagai scored his 100th career point.
- Round 7: Kurt Gidley captained his 107th game for the club, breaking Andrew Johns' record of 106 games for most appearances as captain for the Knights.
- Round 9: Joseph Leilua played his 50th game for the club.
- Round 9: Tariq Sims scored his 1st try for the club.
- Round 10: David Fa'alogo played his 50th game for the club.
- Round 10: Chad Redman made his NRL debut for the club and scored his 1st career try.
- Round 12: Chris Houston played his 150th game for the club.
- Round 12: Sam Mataora made his debut for the club, after previously playing for the Canberra Raiders.
- Round 12: Carlos Tuimavave made his debut for the club, after previously playing for the New Zealand Warriors.
- Round 13: Joseph Leilua scored his 50th career try.
- Round 15: Danny Levi made his NRL debut for the club.
- Round 15: Carlos Tuimavave scored his 1st try for the club.
- Round 16: Dane Gagai scored his 100th point for the club.
- Round 16: Danny Levi scored his 1st career try.
- Round 20: Jeremy Smith played his 50th game for the club.
- Round 21: Lachlan Fitzgibbon made his NRL debut for the club.
- Round 21: Nathan Ross made his NRL debut for the club and scored his 1st career try.
- Round 21: Beau Scott played his 50th game for the club.
- Round 22: Korbin Sims played his 50th game for the club, which was also his 50th career game.
- Round 22: Joseph Tapine scored his 1st career try.
- Round 24: Tyrone Roberts scored his 400th point for the club, which was also his 400th career point.
- Round 25: Kurt Gidley played his 250th game for the club, which was also his 250th career game.
- Round 25: Akuila Uate played his 150th game for the club, which was also his 150th career game.
- Round 26: Beau Scott played his 200th career game.

== Squad ==
Newcastle Knights
| 2015 NRL premiership squad | | | Extended squad players | Coaching staff |
|---|---|---|---|---|
| 139 Clint Newton – SR, LK, PR; 143 Kurt Gidley (c) – FB, FE, HB, HK (gk); 172 Kade Snowden – PR; 179 Jarrod Mullen – FE; 186 James McManus – WG, CE; 202 Chris Houston – LK, SR, PR; 209 Akuila Uate – WG; 223 Tyrone Roberts – HB (gk); 225 Marvin Filipo – SR; 235 Dane Gagai – CE, FB (gk); 237 Robbie Rochow – SR, PR; 238 Beau Scott (vc) – SR, CE; 239 Jeremy Smith – LK | 241 David Fa'alogo – PR (mid-season retirement); 242 Korbin Sims – PR, LK, SR; 243 Joseph Leilua – CE (mid-season loss); 244 Adam Clydsdale – HK; 249 Jake Mamo – FB, WG; 250 Joseph Tapine – LK, SR, PR, CE; 251 Paterika Vaivai – PR, LK; 252 Chanel Mata'utia – WG; 253 Sione Mata'utia – CE, FB, WG, SR; 254 Tyler Randell – HK, FE, LK, HB, CE (gk); 255 Jack Stockwell – PR, LK; 256 Tariq Sims – SR, LK, PR; 257 Chad Redman – HK (mid-season loss) | 258 Sam Mataora – PR; 259 Carlos Tuimavave – FE; 260 Danny Levi – HK; 261 Lachlan Fitzgibbon – PR; 262 Nathan Ross – WG; 000 James Elias – SR; 000 Jaelen Feeney – HB; 000 Pat Mata'utia – CE; 000 Jah Pakau – PR (mid-season loss); 000 Damian Sironen – PR; 000 Michael Steele – PR; 000 James Taylor – LK; 000 Tuiala Togiatasi – PR | Jack Cogger – HB; Bryce Donovan – FB; Jake Finn – PR; Jacob Gagai – CE; Sam Keenan – FE; Josh King – PR; Brock Lamb – FE; Pride Petterson-Robati – LK (pre-season loss); Dylan Phythian – FB; Honeti Tuha – WG; Noel Underwood – SR (mid-season loss); Luke Yates – LK | Head coach: Rick Stone (mid-season termination); Assistant coaches: Danny Buderus (interim head coach); Craig Sandercock; Matt Lantry - NSW Cup coach; Troy Pezet - NYC coach; Legend: (c) Captain(s); (vc) Vice-captain(s); Updated: 31 December 2015; Source(s): Newcastle Knights Profiles, Rugby League Project |

== Transfers and Re-signings ==
=== Gains ===
| Player/Coach | Previous club | Length |
|---|---|---|
| Jake Finn | Western Suburbs Rosellas | 2015 |
| Jacob Gagai | Brisbane Broncos | 2015 |
| Matt Lantry (NSW Cup coach) | Central Newcastle Butcher Boys | 2016 |
| Craig Sandercock (assistant coach) | Hull Kingston Rovers | 2015 |
| Tariq Sims | North Queensland Cowboys | 2016 |
| Damian Sironen | Tweed Heads Seagulls | 2015 |
| Jack Stockwell | St. George Illawarra Dragons | 2017 |
| Carlos Tuimavave | New Zealand Warriors | 2016 |

=== Losses ===
| Player/Coach | Club |
|---|---|
| Wayne Bennett (head coach) | Brisbane Broncos |
| Joe Boyce | Brisbane Broncos |
| Darius Boyd | Brisbane Broncos |
| Mick Crawley (assistant coach & NYC coach) | Canberra Raiders |
| Adam Cuthbertson | Leeds Rhinos |
| Michael Dobson | Salford Red Devils |
| Jacob Gagai | Brisbane Broncos |
| Matt Hilder | Retirement |
| Brenton Horwood | Eastern Suburbs Tigers |
| Toka Likiliki | Released |
| Josh Mantellato | Hull Kingston Rovers |
| Willie Mason | Manly Warringah Sea Eagles |
| Alex McKinnon | Retirement |
| Matt Minto | Central Queensland Capras |
| Russell Packer | Contract terminated |
| Chance Peni | Wests Tigers |
| Anthony Quinn | Retirement |
| Timana Tahu | Retirement |
| Zane Tetevano | Contract terminated |
| Travis Waddell | Brisbane Broncos |
| Brayden Wiliame | Manly Warringah Sea Eagles |

=== Promoted juniors ===
| Player | Junior side |
|---|---|
| Jack Cogger | Knights New South Wales Cup |
| James Elias | Knights New South Wales Cup |
| Jaelen Feeney | Knights National Youth Competition |
| Lachlan Fitzgibbon | Knights National Youth Competition |
| Sam Keenan | Knights National Youth Competition |
| Josh King | Knights National Youth Competition |
| Brock Lamb | Knights National Youth Competition |
| Danny Levi | Knights National Youth Competition |
| Jah Pakau | Knights National Youth Competition |
| Pride Petterson-Robati | Knights National Youth Competition |
| Dylan Phythian | Knights National Youth Competition |
| Michael Steele | Knights New South Wales Cup |
| Tuiala Togiatasi | Knights National Youth Competition |
| Honeti Tuha | Knights New South Wales Cup |
| Noel Underwood | Knights New South Wales Cup |
| Luke Yates | Knights National Youth Competition |

=== Change of role ===
| Player/Coach | New role |
|---|---|
| Danny Buderus (trainer) | Knights assistant coach & interim head coach |
| Troy Pezet (High Performance Unit Manager) | Knights National Youth Competition coach |
| Rick Stone (assistant coach & New South Wales Cup coach) | Knights head coach |
| Ben Tupou | Knights second-tier squad |

=== Re-signings ===
| Player/Coach | Re-signed to |
|---|---|
| Jack Cogger | 2018 |
| Jaelen Feeney | 2017 |
| Lachlan Fitzgibbon | 2017 |
| Dane Gagai | 2017 |
| Brock Lamb | 2017 |
| Danny Levi | 2018 |
| Jake Mamo | 2017 |
| Chanel Mata'utia | 2018 |
| Pat Mata'utia | 2018 |
| Sione Mata'utia | 2018 |
| Tyler Randell | 2017 |
| Korbin Sims | 2017 |
| Jeremy Smith | 2016 |
| Kade Snowden | 2017 |
| Luke Yates | 2017 |

=== Player contract situations ===
| 2015 (left) | 2016 | 2017 | 2018 |
|---|---|---|---|
| Adam Clydsdale | Bryce Donovan | Jaelen Feeney | Jack Cogger |
| James Elias | Josh King | Lachlan Fitzgibbon | Danny Levi |
| David Fa'alogo | Dylan Phythian | Dane Gagai | Chanel Mata'utia |
| Marvin Filipo | Robbie Rochow | Brock Lamb | Pat Mata'utia |
| Jake Finn | Nathan Ross | Jake Mamo | Sione Mata'utia |
| Jacob Gagai | Tariq Sims | Sam Mataora | Jarrod Mullen |
| Kurt Gidley | Jeremy Smith | Tyler Randell | |
| Chris Houston | Joseph Tapine | Korbin Sims | |
| Sam Keenan | James Taylor | Kade Snowden | |
| Joseph Leilua | | Jack Stockwell | |
| James McManus | | Akuila Uate | |
| Clint Newton | | Luke Yates | |
| Jah Pakau | | | |
| Pride Petterson-Robati | | | |
| Chad Redman | | | |
| Tyrone Roberts | | | |
| Beau Scott | | | |
| Damian Sironen | | | |
| Michael Steele | | | |
| Tuiala Togiatasi | | | |
| Honeti Tuha | | | |
| Carlos Tuimavave | | | |
| Noel Underwood | | | |
| Paterika Vaivai | | | |

== Ladder ==
2015 NRL season
| Pos | Team | Pld | W | D | L | B | PF | PA | PD | Pts |
|---|---|---|---|---|---|---|---|---|---|---|
| 1 | Sydney Roosters | 24 | 18 | 0 | 6 | 2 | 591 | 300 | +291 | 40 |
| 2 | Brisbane Broncos | 24 | 17 | 0 | 7 | 2 | 574 | 379 | +195 | 38 |
| 3 | North Queensland Cowboys (P) | 24 | 17 | 0 | 7 | 2 | 587 | 454 | +133 | 38 |
| 4 | Melbourne Storm | 24 | 14 | 0 | 10 | 2 | 467 | 348 | +119 | 32 |
| 5 | Canterbury-Bankstown Bulldogs | 24 | 14 | 0 | 10 | 2 | 522 | 480 | +42 | 32 |
| 6 | Cronulla-Sutherland Sharks | 24 | 14 | 0 | 10 | 2 | 469 | 476 | −7 | 32 |
| 7 | South Sydney Rabbitohs | 24 | 13 | 0 | 11 | 2 | 465 | 467 | −2 | 30 |
| 8 | St. George Illawarra Dragons | 24 | 12 | 0 | 12 | 2 | 435 | 408 | +27 | 28 |
| 9 | Manly-Warringah Sea Eagles | 24 | 11 | 0 | 13 | 2 | 458 | 492 | −34 | 26 |
| 10 | Canberra Raiders | 24 | 10 | 0 | 14 | 2 | 577 | 569 | +8 | 24 |
| 11 | Penrith Panthers | 24 | 9 | 0 | 15 | 2 | 399 | 477 | −78 | 22 |
| 12 | Parramatta Eels | 24 | 9 | 0 | 15 | 2 | 448 | 573 | −125 | 22 |
| 13 | New Zealand Warriors | 24 | 9 | 0 | 15 | 2 | 445 | 588 | −143 | 22 |
| 14 | Gold Coast Titans | 24 | 9 | 0 | 15 | 2 | 439 | 636 | −197 | 22 |
| 15 | Wests Tigers | 24 | 8 | 0 | 16 | 2 | 487 | 562 | −75 | 20 |
| 16 | Newcastle Knights | 24 | 8 | 0 | 16 | 2 | 458 | 612 | −154 | 20 |

== Jerseys and sponsors ==
In 2015, the Knights' jerseys were made by ISC and their major sponsor was Newpave Asphalt.

| 2015 Home Jersey | 2015 Away Jersey | 2015 ANZAC Jersey | 2015 Heritage Jersey | 2015 ISC Marvel Heroes Spider-Man Jersey | 2015 NSW Mining Jersey |

== Fixtures ==
=== Auckland Nines ===
Squad: 1. Sione Mata'utia 2. Jake Mamo 3. Dane Gagai 4. Chanel Mata'utia 5. Carlos Tuimavave 6. Jarrod Mullen (c) 7. Tyrone Roberts 8. Pat Mata'utia 9. Adam Clydsdale 10. Paterika Vaivai 11. Tyler Randell 12. Chris Houston 13. Robbie Rochow 14. Nathan Ross 15. Korbin Sims 16. Joseph Tapine 17. Jack Stockwell 18. Danny Levi

| Date | Round | Opponent | Venue | Score | Tries | Drop Goal Conversions | Attendance |
|---|---|---|---|---|---|---|---|
| Saturday, 31 January | Auckland Nines Game 2 | St. George Illawarra Dragons | Eden Park | 18 – 7 | J.Mamo (3), D.Gagai | J.Mullen (1/4) | |
| Saturday, 31 January | Auckland Nines Game 9 | Parramatta Eels | Eden Park | 15 – 21 | N.Ross, C.Houston, J.Tapine | T.Roberts (1/3) | |
| Sunday, 1 February | Auckland Nines Game 18 | Manly Warringah Sea Eagles | Eden Park | 20 – 17 | T.Randell, T.Roberts, S.Mata'utia, A.Clydsdale | T.Roberts (1/2), J.Mullen (1/2) | |
| Sunday, 1 February | Auckland Nines Quarter-Final 2 | South Sydney Rabbitohs | Eden Park | 6 – 30 | J.Mamo | J.Mullen (1/1) | |
Legend: Win Loss Draw

=== Pre-season trials ===
| Date | Round | Opponent | Venue | Score | Tries | Goals | Attendance |
|---|---|---|---|---|---|---|---|
| Saturday, 14 February | Trial 1 | Port Macquarie Sharks/Wauchope Blues | Lank Bain Sporting Complex, Wauchope | 86 – 0 | T.Randell (2), P.Mata'utia (2), J.Feeney (2), J.Mamo (2), J.Elias (2), S.Mataora, N.Ross, J.Leilua, S.Keenan, M.Filipo, J.Finn | T.Randell (7/9), H.Tuha (2/5), D.Levi (1/1) | |
| Saturday, 21 February | Trial 2 | Canberra Raiders | Seiffert Oval | 26 – 4 | A.Uate (3), J.Leilua, A.Clydsdale | T.Roberts (3/3), K.Gidley (0/2) | 6,350 |
Legend: Win Loss Draw

=== Regular season ===
| Date | Rd | Opponent | Venue | Score | Tries | Goals | Attendance |
|---|---|---|---|---|---|---|---|
| Saturday 7 March | 1 | New Zealand Warriors | Hunter Stadium | 24-14 | D. Gagai (2), T. Randell, Robbie Rochow | T. Roberts (3/3); T. Randell (1/1) | 16,146 |
| Saturday 14 March | 2 | North Queensland Cowboys | 1300SMILES Stadium | 16-14 | J. Leilua (2), A. Uate | T. Roberts (2/3) | 13,006 |
| Sunday 22 March | 3 | Gold Coast Titans | Cbus Super Stadium | 20-18 | D. Gagai, B. Scott, J. Smith | T. Roberts (4/4) | 6,962 |
| Saturday 28 March | 4 | Penrith Panthers | Hunter Stadium | 26-14 | A. Clydsdale, K. Gidley, C. Houston, A. Uate | T. Roberts (5/5) | 20,114 |
| Saturday 4 April | 5 | St George Illawarra Dragons | Hunter Stadium | 0-13 | | | 14,261 |
| Friday 10 April | 6 | Cronulla-Sutherland Sharks | Remondis Stadium | 6-22 | A. Uate | T. Roberts (1/2) | 10,054 |
| Sunday 19 April | 7 | Parramatta Eels | Hunter Stadium | 22-28 | D. Gagai, C. Houston, J. McManus, A. Uate | T. Roberts (3/5) | 16,953 |
| Saturday 25 April | 8 | North Queensland Cowboys | Hunter Stadium | 24-26 | C. Houston, J. Leilua, S. Mata'utia, A. Uate | T. Roberts (4/4) | 15,518 |
| Sunday 10 May | 9 | Manly Warringah Sea Eagles | Brookvale Oval | 10-30 | J. McManus, T. Sims | T. Roberts (1/2) | 10,065 |
| Sunday 17 May | 10 | Wests Tigers | Hunter Stadium | 22-12 | D. Fa'alogo, J. Leilua, J. McManus, C. Redman | T. Roberts (3/4) | 15,573 |
| Monday 25 May | 11 | Brisbane Broncos | Hunter Stadium | 18-31 | J. Leilua, T. Randell, K. Sims | T. Roberts (3/3) | 12,673 |
| Sunday 31 May | 12 | New Zealand Warriors | Mount Smart Stadium | 20-24 | A. Uate (2), D. Gagai, J. McManus | D. Gagai (1/1); T. Randell (1/3) | 13,203 |
| Saturday 6 June | 13 | Canberra Raiders | Hunter Stadium | 22-44 | D. Gagai, J. Leilua, S. Mata'utia, A. Uate | K. Gidley (3/4) | 13,504 |
| | 14 | Bye | | | | | |
| Sunday 21 June | 15 | Cronulla-Sutherland Sharks | Hunter Stadium | 28-30 | J. Mamo, B. Scott, K. Snowden, C. Tuimavave | K. Gidley (6/6) | 14,081 |
| Friday 26 June | 16 | Brisbane Broncos | Suncorp Stadium | 22-44 | D. Gagai, D. Levi, K. Sims, A. Uate | K. Gidley (2/3); D. Gagai(1/1) | 27,246 |
| | 17 | Bye | | | | | |
| Friday 10 July | 18 | Canberra Raiders | GIO Stadium | 22-36 | A. Uate (2), J. McManus, K. Snowden | T. Roberts (3/4) | 6,015 |
| Saturday 18 July | 19 | Gold Coast Titans | Hunter Stadium | 30-2 | K. Gidley, D. Levi, Jake Mamo, J. Mullen, T. Sims | T. Roberts (5/6) | 10,546 |
| Saturday 25 July | 20 | South Sydney Rabbitohs | ANZ Stadium | 6-52 | K. Snowden | T. Roberts | 14,603 |
| Sunday 2 August | 21 | St George Illawarra Dragons | WIN Jubilee | 24-46 | A. Clydsdale, K. Gidley, J. Mamo, T. Randell, N. Ross | T. Roberts (2/5) | 10,236 |
| Sunday 9 August | 22 | Sydney Roosters | Hunter Stadium | 22-38 | K. Gidley, S. Mata'utia, J. Smith, J. Tapine | T. Roberts (3/4) | 17,718 |
| Saturday 15 August | 23 | Wests Tigers | Campbelltown Stadium | 24-18 | T. Roberts (2), T. Randell, A. Uate | T. Roberts (3/4); K. Gidley (1/1) | 10,963 |
| Monday 24 August | 24 | Melbourne Storm | AAMI Park | 20-6 | K. Gidley, T. Roberts, T. Sims | T. Roberts (4/5) | 8,743 |
| Saturday 29 August | 25 | Canterbury Bankstown Bulldogs | Hunter Stadium | 18-20 | K. Gidley. N. Ross, T. Sims | T. Roberts (2/2); K. Gidley (1/1) | 23,605 |
| Saturday 5 September | 26 | Penrith Panthers | Sportingbet Stadium | 12-30 | J. Mamo, C. Newton | T. Roberts (1/1) | 8,936 |
Legend: Win Loss Draw

== Statistics ==
| Name | Appearances | Tries | Goals | Field goals | Points | Captain | Age |
|---|---|---|---|---|---|---|---|
| Adam Clydsdale | 17 | 2 | 0 | 0 | 8 | 0 | 22 |
| David Fa'alogo | 16 | 1 | 0 | 0 | 4 | 0 | 35 |
| Lachlan Fitzgibbon | 1 | 0 | 0 | 0 | 0 | 0 | 21 |
| Dane Gagai | 24 | 7 | 2 | 0 | 32 | 0 | 24 |
| Kurt Gidley | 22 | 6 | 13 | 0 | 50 | 22 | 33 |
| Chris Houston | 22 | 3 | 0 | 0 | 12 | 0 | 30 |
| Joseph Leilua | 13 | 6 | 0 | 0 | 24 | 0 | 24 |
| Danny Levi | 7 | 2 | 0 | 0 | 8 | 0 | 20 |
| Jake Mamo | 9 | 4 | 0 | 0 | 16 | 0 | 21 |
| Sam Mataora | 9 | 0 | 0 | 0 | 0 | 0 | 25 |
| Chanel Mata'utia | 1 | 0 | 0 | 0 | 0 | 0 | 23 |
| Sione Mata'utia | 22 | 3 | 0 | 0 | 12 | 0 | 19 |
| James McManus | 17 | 5 | 0 | 0 | 20 | 0 | 29 |
| Jarrod Mullen | 10 | 1 | 0 | 0 | 4 | 0 | 28 |
| Clint Newton | 10 | 1 | 0 | 0 | 4 | 0 | 34 |
| Tyler Randell | 20 | 4 | 2 | 0 | 20 | 0 | 23 |
| Chad Redman | 2 | 1 | 0 | 0 | 4 | 0 | 23 |
| Tyrone Roberts | 21 | 3 | 54 | 0 | 120 | 0 | 24 |
| Robbie Rochow | 5 | 1 | 0 | 0 | 4 | 0 | 25 |
| Nathan Ross | 6 | 2 | 0 | 0 | 8 | 0 | 27 |
| Beau Scott | 18 | 2 | 0 | 0 | 8 | 2 | 31 |
| Korbin Sims | 22 | 2 | 0 | 0 | 8 | 0 | 23 |
| Tariq Sims | 19 | 4 | 0 | 0 | 16 | 0 | 25 |
| Jeremy Smith | 17 | 2 | 0 | 0 | 8 | 0 | 35 |
| Kade Snowden | 21 | 3 | 0 | 0 | 12 | 0 | 29 |
| Jack Stockwell | 12 | 0 | 0 | 0 | 0 | 0 | 23 |
| Joseph Tapine | 13 | 1 | 0 | 0 | 4 | 0 | 21 |
| Carlos Tuimavave | 5 | 1 | 0 | 0 | 4 | 0 | 23 |
| Akuila Uate | 22 | 12 | 0 | 0 | 48 | 0 | 28 |
| Paterika Vaivai | 5 | 0 | 0 | 0 | 0 | 0 | 23 |
| Totals | 24 | 79 | 71 | 0 | 458 | - | Average: 26 |

30 players used.

== Representative honours ==
The following players appeared in a representative match in 2015.

Australian Schoolboys

- Jayden Butterfield

Cook Islands

- Sam Mataora

Fiji

- Daniel Saifiti
- Jacob Saifiti
- Korbin Sims
- Rick Stone (coach)

Indigenous All Stars

- Dane Gagai
- Tyrone Roberts

Junior Kiwis

- Danny Levi

Lebanon

- James Elias

New South Wales

- Sione Mata'utia (squad member)
- Beau Scott
- Tariq Sims (18th man)

New South Wales Country

- James McManus
- Jarrod Mullen (squad member)
- Tariq Sims
- Kade Snowden
- Akuila Uate

New South Wales Residents

- Chanel Mata'utia
- Nathan Ross (19th man)

New South Wales under-16s

- Mat Croker

New South Wales under-18s

- Jack Cogger (captain)
- Brodie Jones
- Brock Lamb

New South Wales under-20s

- Luke Yates

NRL All Stars

- Beau Scott (captain)
- Jeremy Smith

Prime Minister's XIII

- Dane Gagai
- Jake Mamo (train-on squad)
- Jack Stockwell (train-on squad)

Queensland

- Dane Gagai
- Korbin Sims (20th man)

Samoa

- Joseph Leilua
- Pat Mata'utia
- Carlos Tuimavave

== Individual honours ==
=== Teams and squads ===
National Youth Competition (NYC) Team of the Year

- Danny Levi

New South Wales Cup Team of the Year

- Kerrod Holland

New South Wales Under-20s Origin Pathways Camp

- Bryce Donovan
- Bradie Smith
- Luke Yates

Queensland Academy of Sport Emerging Origin Squad

- Dane Gagai
- Korbin Sims

=== Newcastle Knights awards ===
==== Player of the Year ====
- National Rugby League (NRL) Player of the Year: Kurt Gidley
- New South Wales Cup Player of the Year: Lachlan Fitzgibbon
- National Youth Competition (NYC) Player of the Year: Ken Tofilau

==== Players' Player ====
- National Rugby League (NRL) Players' Player: Kade Snowden
- New South Wales Cup Players' Player: Honeti Tuha
- National Youth Competition (NYC) Players' Player: Fuaimamao Uta

==== Coach's Award ====
- National Rugby League (NRL) Coach's Award: Dane Gagai
- New South Wales Cup Coach's Award: Daniel Saifiti
- National Youth Competition (NYC) Coach's Award: Kerrod Holland

==== Brian Carlson Club-Andrew Johns Medal ====
- Tom Starling
