= 2014 Newcastle Knights season =

- NRL Rank: 12th
- 2014 record: Wins: 10; draws: 0; losses: 14
- Points scored: For: 463; against: 571

Team information
- CEO: Matthew Gidley
- Coach: Wayne Bennett
- Captain: Kurt Gidley
- Stadium: Hunter Stadium
- Avg. attendance: 17,616
- High attendance: 26,401

Top scorers
- Tries: Akuila Uate (12)
- Goals: Kurt Gidley (39)
- Points: Kurt Gidley (86)
← 2013	2015 →

The 2014 Newcastle Knights season was the 27th in the club's history. Coached by Wayne Bennett and captained by Kurt Gidley, they competed in the NRL's 2014 Telstra Premiership, finishing the regular season in 12th place (out of 16).

== Milestones ==
- Round 1: Michael Dobson made his debut for the club, after previously playing for the Hull Kingston Rovers.
- Round 2: Matt Minto made his NRL debut for the club.
- Round 4: Darius Boyd played his 50th game for the club.
- Round 6: Adam Clydsdale scored his 1st career try.
- Round 6: Tyrone Roberts kicked his 100th goal for the club, which was also his 100th career goal.
- Round 7: Jake Mamo made his NRL debut for the club.
- Round 7: Korbin Sims scored his 1st career try.
- Round 8: Dane Gagai played his 50th career game.
- Round 9: Joseph Tapine made his NRL debut for the club.
- Round 9: Paterika Vaivai made his NRL debut for the club.
- Round 13: Darius Boyd played his 200th career game.
- Round 13: Akuila Uate scored his 92nd career try, breaking Timana Tahu's record of 91 tries as the highest ever try-scorer for the Knights.
- Round 14: Jake Mamo scored his 1st career try.
- Round 14: Willie Mason played his 50th game for the club.
- Round 14: Robbie Rochow played his 50th career game.
- Round 16: Dane Gagai played his 50th game for the club.
- Round 16: Robbie Rochow played his 50th game for the club.
- Round 18: Wayne Bennett coached his 700th career game.
- Round 20: Dane Gagai kicked his 1st career goal.
- Round 20: Chanel Mata'utia made his NRL debut for the club.
- Round 20: Sione Mata'utia made his NRL debut for the club.
- Round 20: Kade Snowden played his 150th career game.
- Round 22: Chris Houston played his 150th career game.
- Round 22: Chanel Mata'utia scored his 1st career try.
- Round 22: Travis Waddell scored his 1st try for the club.
- Round 23: Adam Cuthbertson played his 50th game for the club.
- Round 23: Sione Mata'utia scored his 1st career try.
- Round 25: Kurt Gidley captained his 100th game for the club.
- Round 25: Tyler Randell made his NRL debut for the club.
- Round 26: Joseph Leilua played his 100th career game.

== Squad ==
Newcastle Knights
2014 NRL premiership squad				Coaching staff
128 Timana Tahu – CE, SR; 139 Clint Newton – LK; 143 Kurt Gidley (c) – HK, FB, HB, FE (gk); 144 Anthony Quinn – CE (pre-season retirement); 172 Kade Snowden – PR; 179 Jarrod Mullen (vc) – FE; 186 James McManus – WG, CE; 201 Matt Hilder – LK; 202 Chris Houston – SR, LK, PR; 209 Akuila Uate – WG; 223 Tyrone Roberts – HB, HK (gk); 225 Marvin Filipo – SR; 228 Zane Tetevano – PR (mid-season termination)	230 Darius Boyd – FB; 231 Adam Cuthbertson – LK, PR, SR; 232 Alex McKinnon – LK; 233 Willie Mason – PR; 235 Dane Gagai – CE, FB (gk); 237 Robbie Rochow – SR, LK; 238 Beau Scott – SR; 239 Jeremy Smith – LK; 240 Travis Waddell – HK; 241 David Fa'alogo – PR; 242 Korbin Sims – PR, SR; 243 Joseph Leilua – CE; 244 Adam Clydsdale – HK	245 Josh Mantellato – WG (gk); 247 Michael Dobson – FE; 248 Matt Minto – FB; 249 Jake Mamo – WG; 250 Joseph Tapine – PR, LK; 251 Paterika Vaivai – PR; 252 Chanel Mata'utia – WG; 253 Sione Mata'utia – WG, FB; 254 Tyler Randell – HK; 000 Toka Likiliki – PR; 000 Sam Mataora – PR; 000 Pat Mata'utia – CE; 000 Russell Packer – PR (pre-season termination)	000 Chad Redman – HK; Extended squad players: Joe Boyce – LK; Bryce Donovan – FB; Brenton Horwood – LK; Nathan Ross – FB; James Taylor – PR; Ben Tupou – PR; Brayden Wiliame – CE	Head coach: Wayne Bennett; Assistant coaches: Rick Stone - NSW Cup coach; Mick Crawley - NYC coach; Legend: (c) Captain(s); (vc) Vice-captain(s); Updated: 31 December 2014; Source(s): Newcastle Knights Profiles, Rugby League Project

== Transfers and Re-signings ==
=== Gains ===
Player/Coach	Previous club	Length
Michael Dobson	Hull Kingston Rovers	2014
Marvin Filipo	Limoux Grizzlies	2014
Sam Mataora	Canberra Raiders	2014
Matt Minto	Mackay Cutters	2014
Clint Newton	Penrith Panthers	2014
Russell Packer	New Zealand Warriors	2017
Nathan Ross	Kurri Kurri Bulldogs	2014
James Taylor	New Zealand Warriors	2016
Travis Waddell	Souths Logan Magpies	2014
Brayden Wiliame	Parramatta Eels	2014

=== Losses ===
Player/Coach	Club
Chris Adams	Cessnock Goannas
Danny Buderus	Retirement
Neville Costigan	Hull Kingston Rovers
Adrian Davis	Redcliffe Dolphins
Mitchell Frei	Wynnum Manly Seagulls
Craig Gower	Retirement
Jackson Hill	Penrith Panthers
Siuatonga Likiliki	Gold Coast Titans
Rodney Mason	Central Newcastle Butcher Boys
Peter Mata'utia	St. George Illawarra Dragons
Kevin Naiqama	Penrith Panthers
Ben Roose	Kurri Kurri Bulldogs
Will Smith	Penrith Panthers
Ryan Stig	Retirement

=== Promoted juniors ===
Player	Junior side
Joe Boyce	Knights National Youth Competition
Bryce Donovan	Knights National Youth Competition
Brenton Horwood	Knights New South Wales Cup
Jake Mamo	Knights National Youth Competition
Sione Mata'utia	Knights National Youth Competition
Joseph Tapine	Knights National Youth Competition
Ben Tupou	Knights New South Wales Cup

=== Re-signings ===
Player/Coach	Re-signed to
Bryce Donovan	2015
David Fa'alogo	2015
Marvin Filipo	2015
Chris Houston	2016
Joseph Leilua	2016
Danny Levi	2017
Sam Mataora	2017
Chanel Mata'utia	2015
Clint Newton	2015
Jarrod Mullen	2018
Chad Redman	2015
Tyrone Roberts	2016
Nathan Ross	2016
Beau Scott	2017
Ben Tupou	2015
Paterika Vaivai	2016

=== Player contract situations ===
2014 (left)	2015	2016	2017	2018
Joe Boyce	Bryce Donovan	Adam Clydsdale	Sam Mataora	Jarrod Mullen
Darius Boyd	David Fa'alogo	Chris Houston	Beau Scott	
Adam Cuthbertson	Marvin Filipo	Joseph Leilua	Akuila Uate	
Michael Dobson	Dane Gagai	James McManus		
Matt Hilder	Kurt Gidley	Tyrone Roberts		
Brenton Horwood	Jake Mamo	Robbie Rochow		
Toka Likiliki	Chanel Mata'utia	Nathan Ross		
Josh Mantellato	Pat Mata'utia	Joseph Tapine		
Willie Mason	Sione Mata'utia	James Taylor		
Alex McKinnon	Clint Newton	Paterika Vaivai		
Matt Minto	Tyler Randell			
Russell Packer	Chad Redman			
Anthony Quinn	Korbin Sims			
Timana Tahu	Jeremy Smith			
Zane Tetevano	Kade Snowden			
Travis Waddell	Ben Tupou			
Brayden Wiliame				

== Ladder ==
2014 NRL season
Pos	Team	Pld	W	D	L	B	PF	PA	PD	Pts
1	Sydney Roosters	24	16	0	8	2	615	385	+230	36
2	Manly Warringah Sea Eagles	24	16	0	8	2	502	399	+103	36
3	South Sydney Rabbitohs (P)	24	15	0	9	2	585	361	+224	34
4	Penrith Panthers	24	15	0	9	2	506	426	+80	34
5	North Queensland Cowboys	24	14	0	10	2	596	406	+190	32
6	Melbourne Storm	24	14	0	10	2	536	460	+76	32
7	Canterbury-Bankstown Bulldogs	24	13	0	11	2	446	439	+7	30
8	Brisbane Broncos	24	12	0	12	2	549	456	+93	28
9	New Zealand Warriors	24	12	0	12	2	571	491	+80	28
10	Parramatta Eels	24	12	0	12	2	477	580	−103	28
11	St. George Illawarra Dragons	24	11	0	13	2	469	528	−59	26
12	Newcastle Knights	24	10	0	14	2	463	571	−108	24
13	Wests Tigers	24	10	0	14	2	420	631	−211	24
14	Gold Coast Titans	24	9	0	15	2	372	538	−166	22
15	Canberra Raiders	24	8	0	16	2	466	623	−157	20
16	Cronulla-Sutherland Sharks	24	5	0	19	2	334	613	−279	14

== Jerseys and sponsors ==
In 2014, the Knights' jerseys were made by ISC and their major sponsor was Hunter Ports.

2014 Home Jersey	2014 Away Jersey	2014 Close the Gap Jersey	2014 NSW Mining Jersey	2014 Women In League Jersey

== Fixtures ==
=== Pre-season trials ===
Date	Round	Opponent	Venue	Score	Tries	Goals	Attendance
Saturday, 8 February	Trial 1	First Nations Goannas	Hunter Stadium	52 – 12	J.Mamo (3), J.Tapine (2), A.McKinnon, K.Sims, S.Mata'utia, J.Mantellato, M.Minto	J.Mantellato (6/10)	6,826
Saturday, 22 February	Trial 2	Canberra Raiders	Scully Park	34 – 14	J.McManus, A.Uate, J.Leilua, C.Redman, J.Mamo, K.Gidley	T.Roberts (2/2), M.Dobson (3/4)	
Legend: Win Loss Draw

=== Auckland Nines ===
Squad: 1. Adam Cuthbertson 2. Jake Mamo 3. Dane Gagai 4. Joseph Leilua 5. Akuila Uate 6. Jarrod Mullen (c) 7. Tyrone Roberts 8. Willie Mason 9. Adam Clydsdale 10. Chris Houston 11. Beau Scott 12. Robbie Rochow 13. Jeremy Smith 14. Michael Dobson 15. Alex McKinnon 16. Zane Tetevano

Date	Round	Opponent	Venue	Score	Tries	Drop Goal Conversions	Attendance
Saturday, 15 February	Auckland Nines Game 1	Cronulla-Sutherland Sharks	Eden Park	12 – 15	T.Roberts, J.Leilua	J.Mullen (2/2)	89,003
Saturday, 15 February	Auckland Nines Game 10	Gold Coast Titans	Eden Park	25 – 14	J.Leilua (3), J.Smith, J.Mamo	J.Mullen (2/5)	89,003
Sunday, 16 February	Auckland Nines Game 18	Wests Tigers	Eden Park	25 – 0	J.Mamo, T.Roberts, C.Houston, W.Mason, D.Gagai	J.Mullen (2/5)	89,003
Sunday, 16 February	Auckland Nines Quarter-Final 1	Brisbane Broncos	Eden Park	11 – 16	J.Mullen, A.McKinnon	T.Roberts (1/2)	89,003
Legend: Win Loss Draw

=== Regular season ===
2014 Regular season fixtures

== Statistics ==
Name	Appearances	Tries	Goals	Field goals	Points	Captain	Age
Darius Boyd	14	3	0	0	12	0	27
Adam Clydsdale	21	2	0	0	8	0	21
Adam Cuthbertson	18	0	0	0	0	0	29
Michael Dobson	6	0	0	0	0	0	28
David Fa'alogo	18	0	0	0	0	0	34
Dane Gagai	24	7	1	0	30	0	23
Kurt Gidley	23	2	39	0	86	23	32
Chris Houston	18	1	0	0	4	0	29
Joseph Leilua	22	11	0	0	44	0	23
Jake Mamo	7	2	0	0	8	0	20
Josh Mantellato	1	0	3	0	6	0	27
Willie Mason	21	1	0	0	4	0	34
Chanel Mata'utia	7	5	0	0	20	0	22
Sione Mata'utia	7	7	0	0	28	0	18
Alex McKinnon	3	0	0	0	0	0	22
James McManus	16	4	0	0	16	0	28
Matt Minto	2	0	0	0	0	0	24
Jarrod Mullen	16	3	0	1	13	1	27
Clint Newton	2	0	0	0	0	0	33
Tyler Randell	1	0	0	0	0	0	22
Tyrone Roberts	24	9	20	0	76	0	23
Robbie Rochow	24	3	0	0	12	0	24
Beau Scott	20	5	0	0	20	0	30
Korbin Sims	20	2	0	0	8	0	22
Jeremy Smith	18	2	0	0	8	0	34
Kade Snowden	17	0	0	0	0	0	28
Timana Tahu	2	2	0	0	8	0	34
Joseph Tapine	7	0	0	0	0	0	20
Zane Tetevano	3	0	0	0	0	0	24
Akuila Uate	15	12	0	0	48	0	27
Paterika Vaivai	1	0	0	0	0	0	22
Travis Waddell	10	1	0	0	4	0	25
Totals	24	84	63	1	463	-	Average: 26

32 players used.

== Representative honours ==
The following players appeared in a representative match in 2014.

Australia

- Darius Boyd
- Kurt Gidley (train-on squad)
- Willie Mason (train-on squad)
- Sione Mata'utia
- Beau Scott

Australian Schoolboys

- Jack Cogger
- Brock Lamb
- Braden Robson

Fiji

- Korbin Sims
- Rick Stone (coach)

Junior Kangaroos

- Jake Mamo
- Sione Mata'utia (train-on squad)

Junior Kiwis

- Danny Levi
- Chance Peni
- Pride Petterson-Robati (train-on squad)
- Joseph Tapine
- James Taylor (train-on squad)

Lebanon

- James Elias

New South Wales

- James McManus
- Beau Scott

New South Wales Country

- James McManus
- Jarrod Mullen
- Tyrone Roberts
- Robbie Rochow
- Beau Scott (captain)

New South Wales Residents

- Chanel Mata'utia
- Tyler Randell

New South Wales under-16s

- Matt Cooper
- Kurtis Dark
- Brodie Jones
- Brendan O'Hagan
- Tom Starling

New South Wales under-18s

- Sione Mata'utia

New South Wales under-20s

- Jake Mamo
- Sione Mata'utia

Prime Minister's XIII

- Sione Mata'utia
- Beau Scott

Queensland

- Darius Boyd

Queensland under-20s

- Jaelen Feeney

Samoa

- David Fa'alogo (captain)
- Joseph Leilua
- Chanel Mata'utia (train-on squad)
- Sione Mata'utia (train-on squad)

== Individual honours ==
=== Teams and squads ===
National Youth Competition (NYC) Team of the Year

- Mick Crawley (coach)
- Danny Levi
- Jake Mamo
- Sione Mata'utia
- Joseph Tapine

New South Wales Cup Team of the Year

- Michael Dobson
- Josh Mantellato
- Tyler Randell
- Nathan Ross

Queensland Academy of Sport Emerging Origin Squad

- Dane Gagai
- Korbin Sims

Queensland Academy of Sport Under-20s Emerging Origin Squad

- Jaelen Feeney

New South Wales Under-20s Origin Pathways Camp

- Jake Mamo
- Sione Mata'utia

=== Dally M awards ===
Dally M Second Rower of the Year

- Beau Scott

=== Newcastle Knights awards ===
==== Player of the Year ====
- National Rugby League (NRL) Player of the Year: Beau Scott
- New South Wales Cup Player of the Year: Paterika Vaivai
- National Youth Competition (NYC) Player of the Year: Sione Mata'utia

==== Players' Player ====
- National Rugby League (NRL) Players' Player: Kurt Gidley
- New South Wales Cup Players' Player: Chad Redman
- National Youth Competition (NYC) Players' Player: Luke Yates

==== Coach's Award ====
- National Rugby League (NRL) Coach's Award: Alex McKinnon & Beau Scott
- New South Wales Cup Coach's Award: Tyler Randell
- National Youth Competition (NYC) Coach's Award: Lachlan Fitzgibbon

==== Brian Carlson Club-Andrew Johns Medal ====
- Jack Cogger
