= 2013 Newcastle Knights season =

- NRL Rank: 7th
- Play-off result: Preliminary Finalists (Week 3)
- 2013 record: Wins: 12; draws: 1; losses: 11
- Points scored: For: 528; against: 422

Team information
- CEO: Matthew Gidley
- Coach: Wayne Bennett
- Captain: Kurt Gidley
- Stadium: Hunter Stadium
- Avg. attendance: 18,836
- High attendance: 26,822

Top scorers
- Tries: James McManus (19)
- Goals: Tyrone Roberts (48)
- Points: Tyrone Roberts (120)
← 2012	2014 →

The 2013 Newcastle Knights season was the 26th in the club's history. Coached by Wayne Bennett and captained by Kurt Gidley, they competed in the NRL's 2013 Telstra Premiership, finishing the regular season in 7th place (out of 16), thus reaching the finals. The Knights then came within one match of the grand final but were knocked out by eventual premiers, the Sydney Roosters.

== Milestones ==
- Round 1: Beau Scott made his debut for the club, after previously playing for the St. George Illawarra Dragons.
- Round 1: Jeremy Smith made his debut for the club, after previously playing for the Cronulla-Sutherland Sharks.
- Round 1: Travis Waddell made his debut for the club, after previously playing for the Canberra Raiders.
- Round 3: David Fa'alogo made his debut for the club, after previously playing for the Huddersfield Giants.
- Round 3: Korbin Sims made his NRL debut for the club.
- Round 4: Adam Cuthbertson scored his 1st try for the club.
- Round 4: Chris Houston played his 100th game for the club.
- Round 5: Jarrod Mullen played his 150th game for the club, which was also his 150th career game.
- Round 6: Joseph Leilua made his debut for the club, after previously playing for the Sydney Roosters.
- Round 7: David Fa'alogo scored his 1st try for the club.
- Round 7: James McManus scored his 50th try for the club, which was also his 50th career try.
- Round 9: Adam Clydsdale made his NRL debut for the club.
- Round 9: Kurt Gidley played his 200th game for the club, which was also his 200th career game.
- Round 10: David Fa'alogo played his 150th career game.
- Round 10: Joseph Leilua scored his 1st try for the club.
- Round 11: Akuila Uate played his 100th game for the club, which was also his 100th career game.
- Round 12: Josh Mantellato made his NRL debut for the club, scored his 1st career try and kicked his 1st career goal.
- Round 13: Wayne Bennett coached his 670th career game, becoming the most experienced coach ever in the NRL.
- Round 14: Craig Gower made his debut for the club, after previously playing for the London Broncos.
- Round 16: James McManus scored 4 tries, equalling Darren Albert, Adam MacDougall, Andrew Johns, Cooper Vuna and Akuila Uate's record of most tries scored in a match by 1 player for the Knights.
- Round 17: Jeremy Smith played his 150th career game.
- Round 19: Craig Gower scored his 1st try for the club.
- Round 19: Kade Snowden played his 50th game for the club and scored his 1st try for the club.
- Round 21: Neville Costigan played his 50th game for the club.
- Round 21: Beau Scott scored his 1st try for the club.
- Round 22: Danny Buderus played his 250th game for the club, which was also his 250th career game, breaking Andrew Johns' record of 249 games for most appearances for the Knights.
- Round 25: Kurt Gidley kicked his 400th try for the club, which was also his 400th career goal.
- Round 26: Danny Buderus kicked his 1st career goal.
- Round 26: Jeremy Smith scored his 1st try for the club.
- Finals Week 1: Tyrone Roberts played his 50th game for the club, which was also his 50th career game.
- Finals Week 2: Matt Hilder played his 200th career game and 100th game for the club.
- Finals Week 2: Willie Mason played his 250th career game.

== Squad ==
Newcastle Knights
2013 NRL premiership squad				Coaching staff
103 Danny Buderus – HK (gk); 128 Timana Tahu – CE; 143 Kurt Gidley (c) – HK, HB, FE, FB (gk); 144 Anthony Quinn – CE; 172 Kade Snowden – PR; 179 Jarrod Mullen (vc) – FE; 186 James McManus – WG; 201 Matt Hilder – HK; 202 Chris Houston (vc) – SR, LK, PR; 209 Akuila Uate – WG; 220 Kevin Naiqama – WG, FB; 221 Neville Costigan – LK, HK; 223 Tyrone Roberts – HB, HK (gk)	225 Marvin Filipo – SR (mid-season termination); 226 Peter Mata'utia – CE; 227 Ryan Stig – FE, HB; 228 Zane Tetevano – PR, LK; 229 Siuatonga Likiliki – CE, WG; 230 Darius Boyd – FB; 231 Adam Cuthbertson – LK, PR; 232 Alex McKinnon – SR, LK, CE; 233 Willie Mason – PR; 234 Chris Adams – HK; 235 Dane Gagai – CE; 237 Robbie Rochow – SR, PR; 238 Beau Scott – SR	239 Jeremy Smith – LK; 240 Travis Waddell – HK (mid-season loan); 241 David Fa'alogo – PR, LK; 242 Korbin Sims – PR; 243 Joseph Leilua – CE; 244 Adam Clydsdale – HK; 245 Josh Mantellato – WG (gk); 246 Craig Gower – HK, HB; 000 Adrian Davis – HB; 000 Mitchell Frei – PR; 000 Toka Likiliki – PR; 000 Rodney Mason – PR; 000 Chanel Mata'utia – WG	000 Tyler Randell – FE; 000 Chad Redman – HK; 000 Nathan Ross – WG (pre-season loss); 000 Will Smith – FE; 000 Paterika Vaivai – PR; Extended squad players: Pat Mata'utia – CE; Ben Roose – LK	Head coach: Wayne Bennett; Assistant coaches: Rick Stone - NSW Cup coach; Mick Crawley - NYC coach; Legend: (c) Captain(s); (vc) Vice-captain(s); Updated: 31 December 2013; Source(s): Newcastle Knights Profiles, Rugby League Project

== Transfers and Re-signings ==
=== Gains ===
Player/Coach	Previous club	Length
David Fa'alogo	Huddersfield Giants	2013
Mitchell Frei	Brisbane Broncos	2013
Craig Gower	London Broncos	2013
Joseph Leilua	Sydney Roosters	2014
Toka Likiliki	New Zealand Warriors	2014
Anthony Quinn	Melbourne Storm	2013
Beau Scott	St. George Illawarra Dragons	2016
Jeremy Smith	Cronulla-Sutherland Sharks	2015
Travis Waddell	Canberra Raiders	2014

=== Losses ===
Player/Coach	Club
Sam Anderson	Penrith Panthers
Ethan Cook	Penrith Panthers
Joel Edwards	Canberra Raiders
Richard Fa'aoso	Melbourne Storm
Albert Kelly	Contract terminated
Daine Laurie	Wyong Roos
Lorenzo Ma'afu	Parramatta Eels
Kurt Mann	Melbourne Storm
Maipele Morseau	Released
Wes Naiqama	Penrith Panthers
Kyle O'Donnell	Penrith Panthers
Api Pewhairangi	Parramatta Eels
Junior Sa'u	Melbourne Storm
Simione Sawene	Released
Warren Schillings	Western Suburbs Rosellas
Zeb Taia	Catalans Dragons
Rip Taylor (NSW Cup coach)	Wyong Roos
Evarn Tuimavave	Hull Kingston Rovers
Watisoni Votu	Fiji Rugby Union
Mark Wade	Merewether Carlton Rugby Club

=== Promoted juniors ===
Player	Junior side
Adam Clydsdale	Knights National Youth Competition
Josh Mantellato	Knights New South Wales Cup
Pat Mata'utia	Knights National Youth Competition
Ben Roose	Knights National Youth Competition
Nathan Ross	Knights New South Wales Cup
Paterika Vaivai	Knights National Youth Competition

=== Change of role ===
Player/Coach	New role
Rick Stone (assistant coach)	Knights assistant coach & New South Wales Cup coach

=== Re-signings ===
Player/Coach	Re-signed to
Adam Clydsdale	2016
David Fa'alogo	2014
Dane Gagai	2015
Matt Hilder	2014
Josh Mantellato	2014
Chanel Mata'utia	2014
Pat Mata'utia	2015
Sione Mata'utia	2015
James McManus	2016
Anthony Quinn	2014
Chad Redman	2014
Robbie Rochow	2016
Korbin Sims	2015
Timana Tahu	2014
Zane Tetevano	2015
Akuila Uate	2017
Paterika Vaivai	2014

=== Player contract situations ===
2013 (left)	2014	2015	2016	2017
Chris Adams	Adam Cuthbertson	Darius Boyd	Adam Clydsdale	Akuila Uate
Danny Buderus	David Fa'alogo	Dane Gagai	James McManus	
Neville Costigan	Matt Hilder	Kurt Gidley	Robbie Rochow	
Adrian Davis	Chris Houston	Pat Mata'utia	Beau Scott	
Marvin Filipo	Joseph Leilua	Tyler Randell		
Mitchell Frei	Toka Likiliki	Korbin Sims		
Craig Gower	Josh Mantellato	Jeremy Smith		
Siuatonga Likiliki	Willie Mason	Kade Snowden		
Rodney Mason	Chanel Mata'utia	Zane Tetevano		
Peter Mata'utia	Alex McKinnon			
Kevin Naiqama	Jarrod Mullen			
Ben Roose	Anthony Quinn			
Nathan Ross	Chad Redman			
Will Smith	Tyrone Roberts			
Ryan Stig	Timana Tahu			
	Travis Waddell			
	Paterika Vaivai			

== Ladder ==
2013 NRL season
Pos	Team	Pld	W	D	L	B	PF	PA	PD	Pts
1	Sydney Roosters (P)	24	18	0	6	2	640	325	+315	40
2	South Sydney Rabbitohs	24	18	0	6	2	588	384	+204	40
3	Melbourne Storm	24	16	1	7	2	589	373	+216	37
4	Manly Warringah Sea Eagles	24	15	1	8	2	588	366	+222	35
5	Cronulla-Sutherland Sharks	24	14	0	10	2	468	460	+8	32
6	Canterbury-Bankstown Bulldogs	24	13	0	11	2	529	463	+66	30
7	Newcastle Knights	24	12	1	11	2	528	422	+106	29
8	North Queensland Cowboys	24	12	0	12	2	507	431	+76	28
9	Gold Coast Titans	24	11	0	13	2	500	518	−18	26
10	Penrith Panthers	24	11	0	13	2	495	532	−37	26
11	New Zealand Warriors	24	11	0	13	2	495	554	−59	26
12	Brisbane Broncos	24	10	1	13	2	434	477	−43	25
13	Canberra Raiders	24	10	0	14	2	434	624	−190	24
14	St. George Illawarra Dragons	24	7	0	17	2	379	530	−151	18
15	Wests Tigers	24	7	0	17	2	386	687	−301	18
16	Parramatta Eels	24	5	0	19	2	326	740	−414	14

== Jerseys and sponsors ==
In 2013, the Knights' jerseys were made by ISC and their major sponsor was Hunter Ports.

2013 Home Jersey	2013 Away Jersey

== Fixtures ==
=== Pre-season trials ===
Date	Round	Opponent	Venue	Score	Tries	Goals	Attendance
Saturday, 16 February	Trial 1	South Sydney Rabbitohs	BCU International Stadium	18 – 6	T.Roberts (2), M.Hilder	K.Gidley (1/1), T.Roberts (1/1), P.Mata'utia (1/1)	
Saturday, 23 February	Trial 2	Cronulla-Sutherland Sharks	Scully Park	16 – 22	K.Naiqama, A.Uate, P.Mata'utia	K.Gidley (1/2), T.Roberts (1/1)	
Legend: Win Loss Draw

=== Regular season ===
2013 Regular season fixtures

== Statistics ==
Name	Appearances	Tries	Goals	Field goals	Points	Captain	Age
Darius Boyd	26	11	0	0	42	0	26
Danny Buderus	15	1	1	0	6	0	35
Adam Clydsdale	2	0	0	0	0	0	20
Neville Costigan	19	1	0	0	4	0	28
Adam Cuthbertson	13	2	0	0	8	0	28
David Fa'alogo	22	2	0	0	8	0	33
Dane Gagai	23	5	0	0	20	0	22
Kurt Gidley	14	2	38	0	84	11	31
Craig Gower	6	1	0	0	4	0	35
Matt Hilder	6	1	0	0	4	0	31
Chris Houston	24	3	0	0	12	1	28
Joseph Leilua	19	13	0	0	52	0	22
Josh Mantellato	1	1	3	0	10	0	26
Willie Mason	22	0	0	0	0	0	33
Alex McKinnon	19	2	0	0	8	0	21
James McManus	24	19	0	0	76	0	27
Jarrod Mullen	26	2	0	0	8	15	26
Kevin Naiqama	6	2	0	0	8	0	24
Anthony Quinn	4	1	0	0	4	0	30
Tyrone Roberts	27	6	48	0	120	0	22
Robbie Rochow	27	2	0	0	8	0	23
Beau Scott	16	2	0	0	8	0	29
Korbin Sims	12	0	0	0	0	0	21
Jeremy Smith	19	2	0	0	8	0	33
Kade Snowden	20	1	0	0	4	0	27
Timana Tahu	5	2	0	0	8	0	33
Zane Tetevano	8	1	0	0	4	0	23
Akuila Uate	24	15	0	0	60	0	26
Travis Waddell	10	0	0	0	0	0	24
Totals	27	100	91	0	582	-	Average: 27

29 players used.

== Representative honours ==
The following players appeared in a representative match in 2013.

Australia

- Darius Boyd
- Kurt Gidley

Australian Schoolboys

- Sione Mata'utia

Cook Islands

- Zane Tetevano

Fiji

- Kevin Naiqama
- Korbin Sims
- Rick Stone (coach)
- Akuila Uate

Indigenous All Stars

- Timana Tahu
- Travis Waddell

Italy

- Josh Mantellato
- Kade Snowden

Junior Kiwis

- Joseph Tapine

New South Wales

- James McManus

New South Wales City

- Adam Cuthbertson

New South Wales Country

- Willie Mason
- Alex McKinnon
- James McManus
- Akuila Uate

New South Wales Residents

- Adrian Davis
- Matt Hilder
- Josh Mantellato
- Peter Mata'utia
- Kevin Naiqama

New South Wales under-16s

- Jack Cogger
- Brock Lamb

New South Wales under-18s

- Sione Mata'utia

NRL All Stars

- Wayne Bennett (coach)
- Willie Mason
- Akuila Uate

Papua New Guinea

- Neville Costigan (captain)

Queensland

- Darius Boyd

Samoa

- David Fa'alogo
- Joseph Leilua

Tonga

- Siuatonga Likiliki

== Individual honours ==
=== Teams and squads ===
New South Wales Cup Team of the Year

- Josh Mantellato
- Peter Mata'utia

=== Dally M awards ===
Top Try-scorer

- James McManus (19 tries)

=== Newcastle Knights awards ===
==== Player of the Year ====
- National Rugby League (NRL) Player of the Year: Darius Boyd
- New South Wales Cup Player of the Year: Kevin Naiqama
- National Youth Competition (NYC) Player of the Year: Adam Clydsdale

==== Players' Player ====
- National Rugby League (NRL) Players' Player: Danny Buderus
- New South Wales Cup Players' Player: Matt Hilder
- National Youth Competition (NYC) Players' Player: Jake Mamo

==== Coach's Award ====
- National Rugby League (NRL) Coach's Award: Robbie Rochow
- New South Wales Cup Coach's Award: Mitchell Frei
- National Youth Competition (NYC) Coach's Award: Joseph Tapine

==== Brian Carlson Club-Andrew Johns Medal ====
- Sione Mata'utia
