= Jack Stockwell =

Australian rugby league footballer (born 1992)

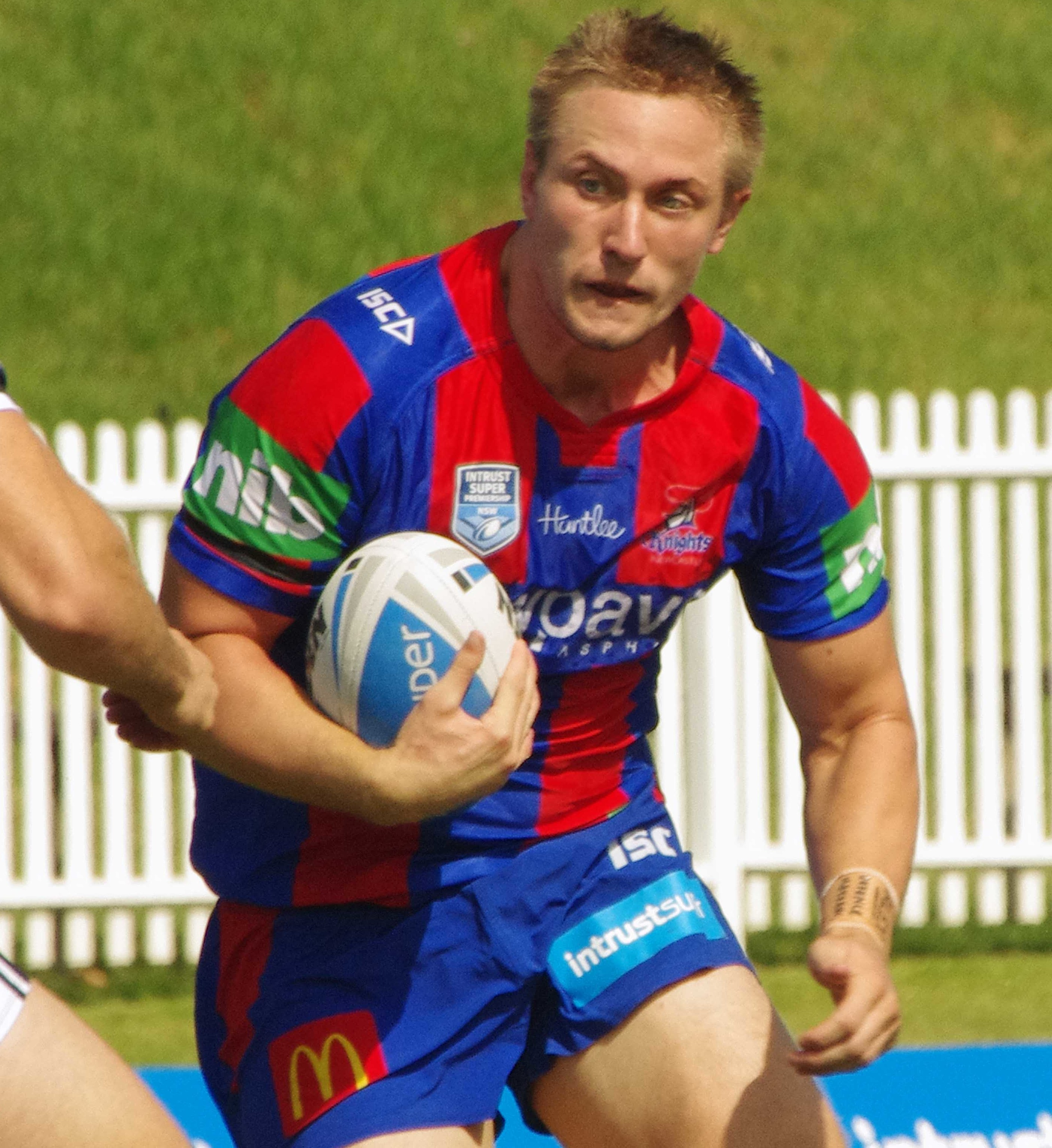

Personal information
- Born: 2 March 1992 (age 33); Campbelltown, New South Wales, Australia
- Height: 192 cm (6 ft 4 in)
- Weight: 110 kg (17 st 5 lb)

Playing information
- Position: Prop
Club
Years	Team	Pld	T	G	FG	P
2012–14	St. George Illawarra	35	2	0	0	8
2015–17	Newcastle Knights	28	2	0	0	8
2018–19	Gold Coast Titans	30	1	0	0	4
	Total	93	5	0	0	20
- Source: As of 22 September 2019

Jack Stockwell (born 2 March 1992) is an Australian professional rugby league footballer who plays as a prop and lock for the Burleigh Bears in the Queensland Cup.

He previously played for the St. George Illawarra Dragons, Newcastle Knights, and Gold Coast Titans in the National Rugby League.

== Background ==
Stockwell was born in Campbelltown, New South Wales, Australia.

He played his junior football for the Picton Magpies, before being signed by the St. George Illawarra Dragons.

== Playing career ==
=== Early career ===
From 2009 to 2012, Stockwell played for the St. George Illawarra Dragons' NYC team.

=== 2012 ===
In round 11 of the 2012 NRL season, Stockwell made his NRL debut for St. George against the South Sydney Rabbitohs.

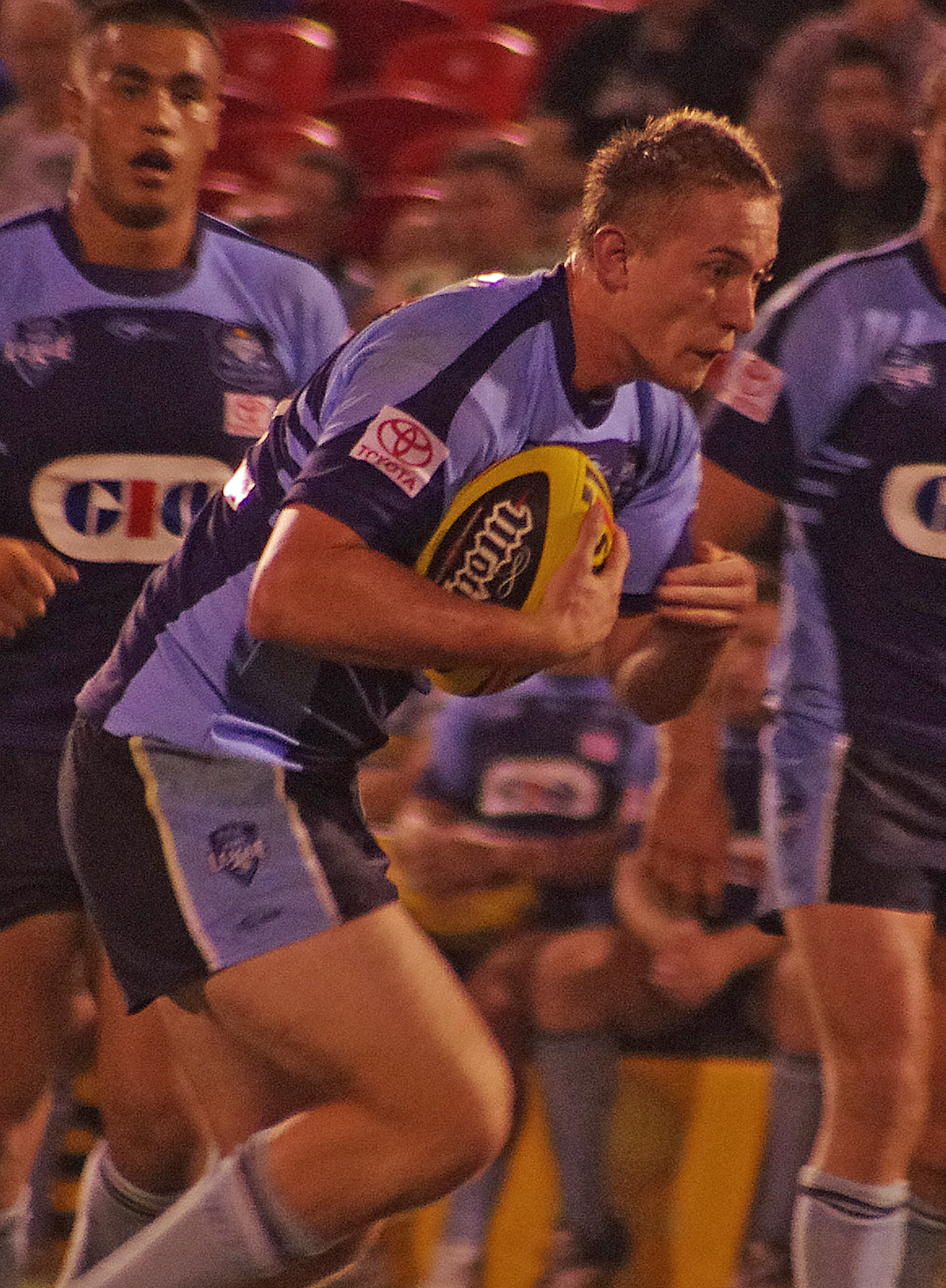
Stockwell playing for the New South Wales under 20s

On 21 April, he played for the New South Wales under-20s team against the Queensland under-20s team in the inaugural under-20s State of Origin match. On 27 June, he played for the New South Wales Residents against the Queensland Residents. On 12 September, he was named at prop in the 2012 New South Wales Cup Team of the Year. On 13 October, he played for the Junior Kangaroos against the Junior Kiwis.

=== 2013 ===
On 20 December, Stockwell re-signed with St. George Illawarra on a four-year contract.

=== 2014 ===
On 31 October, Stockwell signed a three-year contract with the Newcastle Knights starting in 2015, after being released from the final three years of his St. George contract.

=== 2015 ===
In round 1 of the 2015 NRL season, Stockwell made his Newcastle debut against the New Zealand Warriors. After playing in 12 games for the Knights, he injured his bicep against the Canberra Raiders in round 13, ruling him out for the rest of the season. Newcastle would finish the 2015 NRL season on the bottom of the table.

=== 2016 ===
Stockwell returned from injury only to play six games for Newcastle in 2016 under the new coaching of Nathan Brown, spending most of the season in the Intrust Super Premiership NSW. Newcastle would finish last in both competitions in 2016.

=== 2017 ===
Stockwell was able to work his way back into the NRL team for the beginning of 2017, playing 10 matches before being dropped back to the Intrust Super Premiership NSW. Newcastle would finish the 2017 NRL season on the bottom of the table for a third year in a row. He left the club at the end of the season after not being offered a new contract beyond 2017. In November, he signed a one-year contract with the Gold Coast Titans starting in 2018.

=== 2018 ===
Stockwell made his debut for the Gold Coast in round 6 of the 2018 NRL season against Penrith at Penrith Park which ended in a 35-12 loss. Stockwell made a total of 16 appearances for the Gold Coast in 2018 as the club finished in 14th place on the table.

=== 2019 ===
Stockwell made a total of 14 appearances for the Gold Coast in the 2019 NRL season as the club endured a horror year on and off the field. During the halfway mark of the season, head coach Garth Brennan was sacked by the club after a string of poor results. The Gold Coast managed to win only four games for the entire season and finished last claiming the Wooden Spoon.

=== 2020 ===
On 5 December 2019, after failing to be re-signed by the Gold Coast club, it was revealed that Stockwell had signed on with Queensland Cup outfit, the Burleigh Bears, for the 2020 season.
