= Sam Mataora =

Cook Islands international rugby league footballer

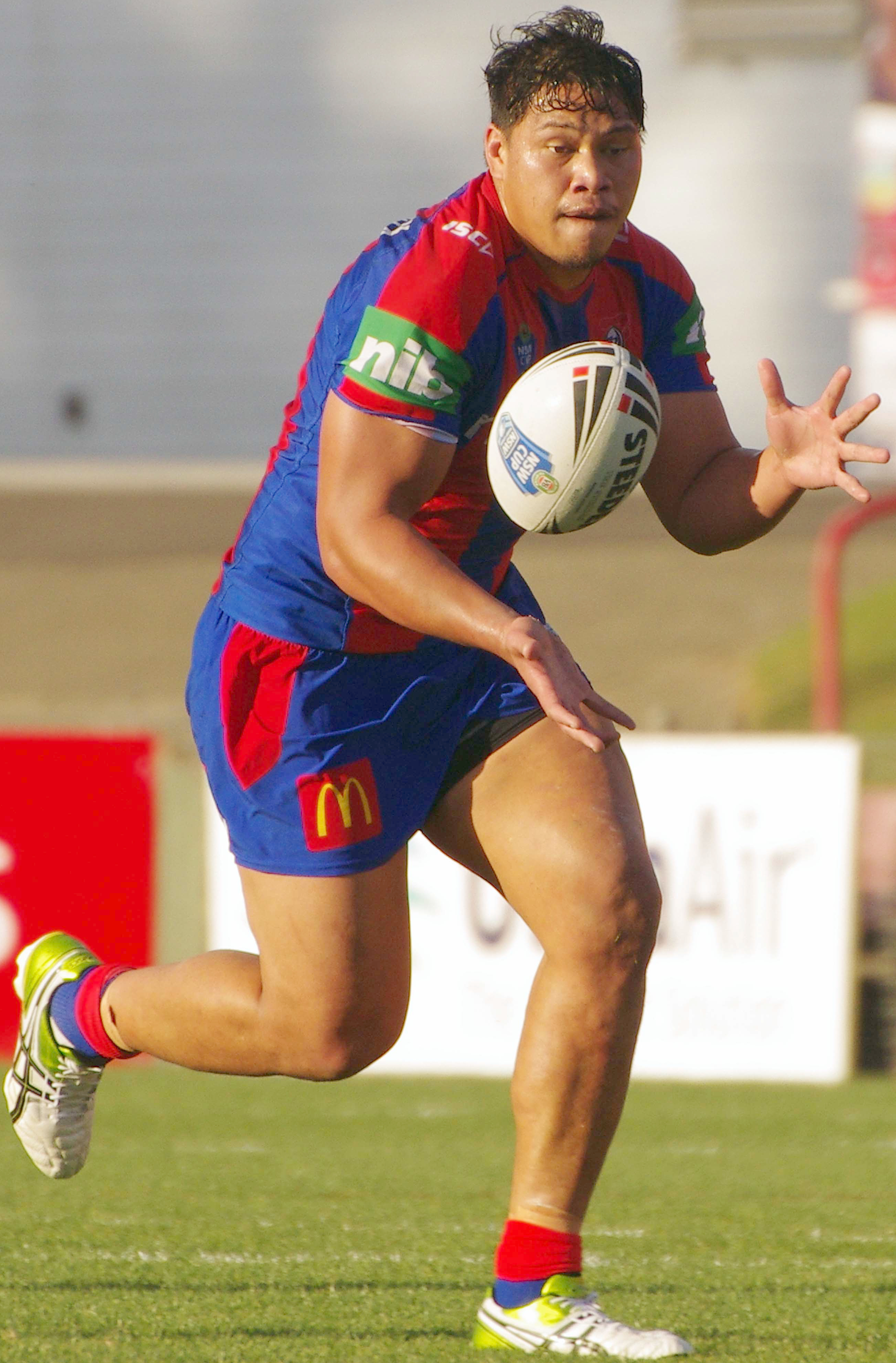

Personal information
- Born: 20 October 1990 (age 36) Rarotonga, Cook Islands
- Height: 190 cm (6 ft 3 in)
- Weight: 111 kg (17 st 7 lb)

Playing information
- Position: Prop, Second-row
Club
Years	Team	Pld	T	G	FG	P
2010–13	Canberra Raiders	33	2	0	0	8
2015–17	Newcastle Knights	30	2	0	0	8
	Total	63	4	0	0	16
Representative
Years	Team	Pld	T	G	FG	P
2009–19	Cook Islands	8	0	0	0	0
2019	Cook Island 9s	3	0	0	0	0
- Source: As of 19 October 2019

Sam Mataora (born 20 October 1990) is a Cook Island professional rugby league footballer. He played for the Canberra Raiders and Newcastle Knights in the National Rugby League. His positions were prop and second-row.

== Background ==
Born in Rarotonga, Cook Islands, Mataora moved to Brisbane, Australia when he was 11 years old and played his junior football for Souths Sunnybank while attending Cavendish Road State High School. He was then signed by the Canberra Raiders.

== Playing career ==
=== Early career ===
In 2009 and 2010, Mataora played for the Canberra Raiders' NYC team. In 2009, he played for the Cook Islands in the 2009 Pacific Cup.

=== 2010 ===
In Round 8 of the 2010 NRL season, Mataora made his NRL debut for the Raiders against the New Zealand Warriors. He played for the Junior Kiwis that year and was named at second-row in the 2010 NYC Team of the Year.

=== 2011 ===
In 2011, Mataora was selected in the Cook Islands 18-man squad to face New Zealand at the end of the year, although the NZRL called off the match due to players being unavailable.

=== 2012 ===
In June 2012, Mataora re-signed with the Raiders on a 2-year contract.

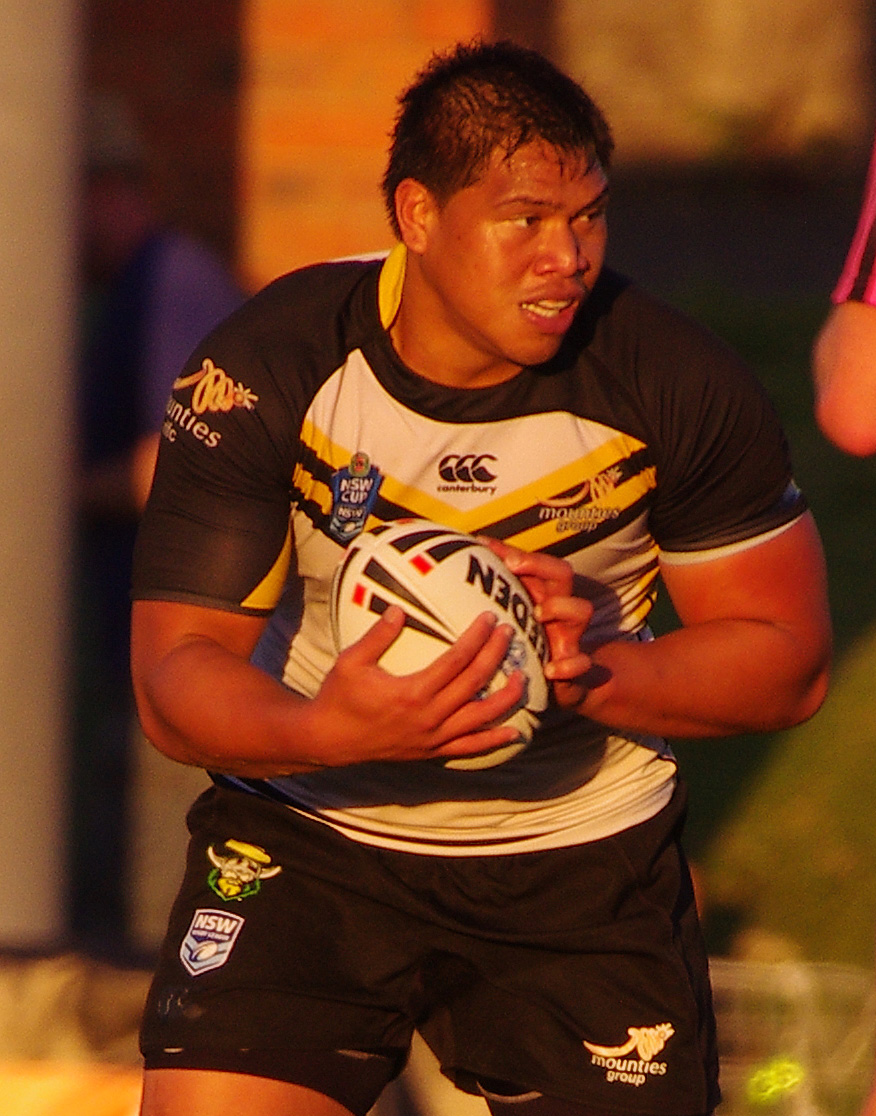
Mataora playing for the Mount Pritchard Mounties

=== 2013 ===
In 2013, Mataora played for the Cook Islands in the 2013 Rugby League World Cup.

=== 2014 ===
In July 2014, Mataora joined the Newcastle Knights mid-season for the remainder of the year. On 1 November 2014, he re-signed with the Knights on a 3-year contract.

=== 2015 ===
In Round 12 of the 2015 NRL season, Mataora made his Knights debut against the New Zealand Warriors. On 27 September, he played in the Knights' 2015 New South Wales Cup Grand Final victory over the Wyong Roos. On 17 October, he played for the Cook Islands against Tonga in their Asia-Pacific Qualifier match for the 2017 Rugby League World Cup

=== 2016 ===
Mataora experience a breakout year in 2016, playing in 20 matches for the Knights and scoring 2 tries.

=== 2017 ===
Due to injuries and fitness, Mataora only played 1 match for the Knights NRL side in 2017. He retired from the game in July after struggling to cope with depression.

== Statistics ==
Year	Team	Games	Tries	Pts
2010	Canberra Raiders	4		
2011	Canberra Raiders	10		
2012	Canberra Raiders	16	2	8
2013	Canberra Raiders	3		
2015	Newcastle Knights	9		
2016	Newcastle Knights	20	2	8
2017	Newcastle Knights	1		
	Totals	63	4	16
