= Danny Levi =

NZ & Samoa international rugby league footballer

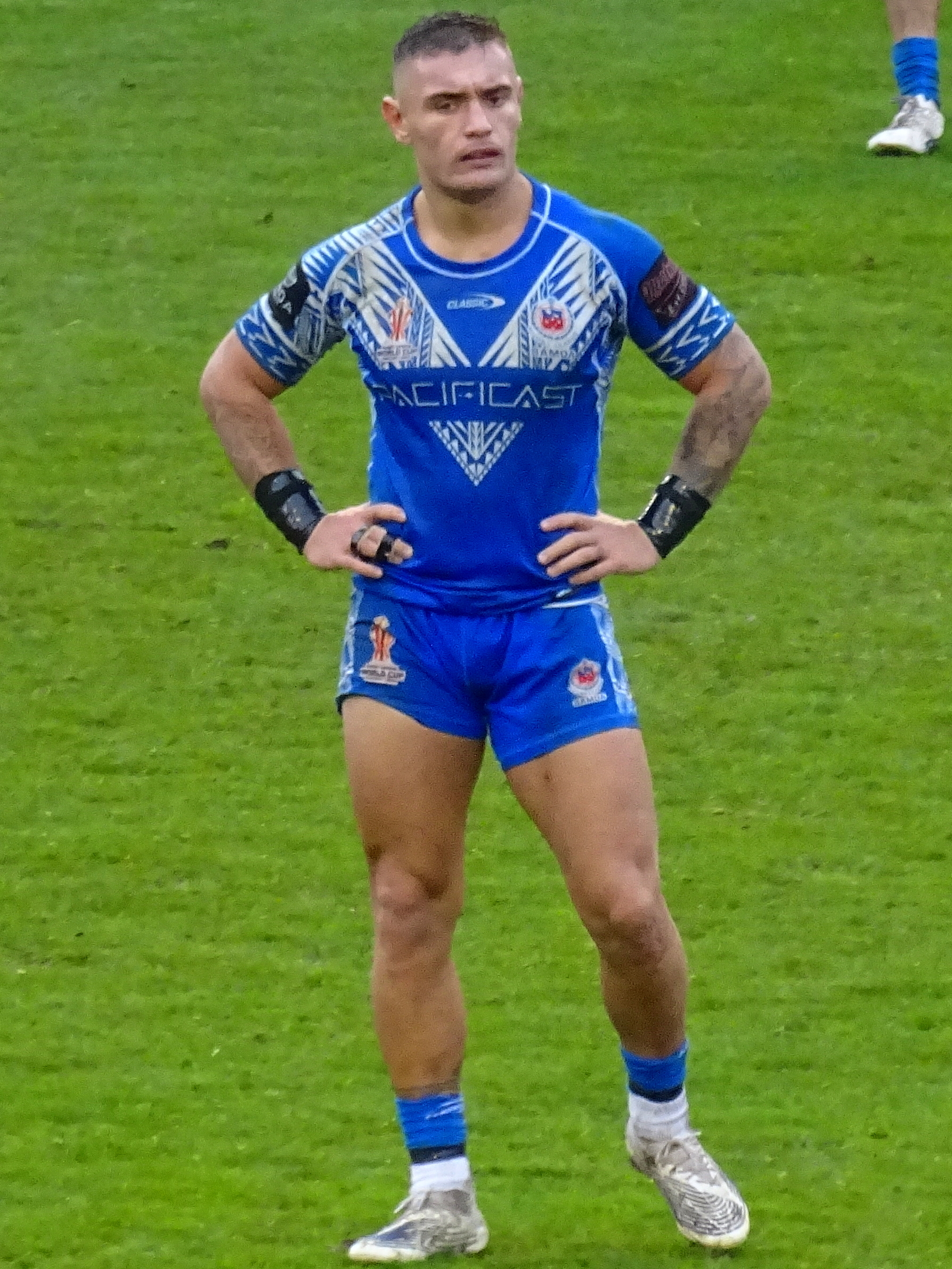

Personal information
- Full name: Daniel Levi
- Born: 5 December 1995 (age 30) Wellington, New Zealand
- Height: 5 ft 10 in (1.77 m)
- Weight: 14 st 0 lb (89 kg)

Playing information
- Position: Hooker
Club
Years	Team	Pld	T	G	FG	P
2015–19	Newcastle Knights	83	5	0	0	20
2020	Manly Sea Eagles	20	2	0	0	8
2021	Brisbane Broncos	9	0	0	0	0
2022	Huddersfield Giants	30	4	0	0	16
2023–25	Canberra Raiders	29	6	0	0	24
2026–	Leeds Rhinos	22	2	0	0	8
	Total	193	19	0	0	76
Representative
Years	Team	Pld	T	G	FG	P
2017–23	New Zealand	4	0	0	0	0
2019	Māori All Stars	1	0	0	0	0
2019–22	Samoa	5	2	0	0	8
2019	Samoa 9s	4	2	1	0	11
- Source: As of 20 November 2026

Daniel Levi (born 5 December 1995) is a professional rugby league footballer who plays as a hooker for the Leeds Rhinos in the Super League He has played for New Zealand, New Zealand Māori and Samoa at international level.

He previously played for the Newcastle Knights, Brisbane Broncos, Manly Warringah Sea Eagles and the Canberra Raiders in the NRL, and the Huddersfield Giants in the Super League.

== Background ==
Levi was born in Wellington, New Zealand, and is of Māori and Samoan descent.

He played his junior rugby league for the Randwick Kingfishers. He then moved to Australia and played for the Glenmore Park Brumbies, before being signed by the Newcastle Knights.

== Playing career ==
=== Early career ===
Midway through the 2013 season, Levi signed with the Newcastle Knights on a 2 1/2-year contract effective immediately. From 2013 to 2015, he played for the Knights' NYC team, captaining the side in 2014 as an 18-year-old and also in 2015. On 2 September 2014, he was named on the interchange bench in the 2014 NYC Team of the Year. On 24 September 2014, he extended his contract with the Knights to the end of 2017. On 18 October 2014, he played for the Junior Kiwis against the Junior Kangaroos.

=== 2015 ===
Levi played for the Knights in the pre-season Auckland Nines.

On 2 May, he again played for the Junior Kiwis, coming off the interchange bench in the Kiwis' 22-20 loss to the Junior Kangaroos.

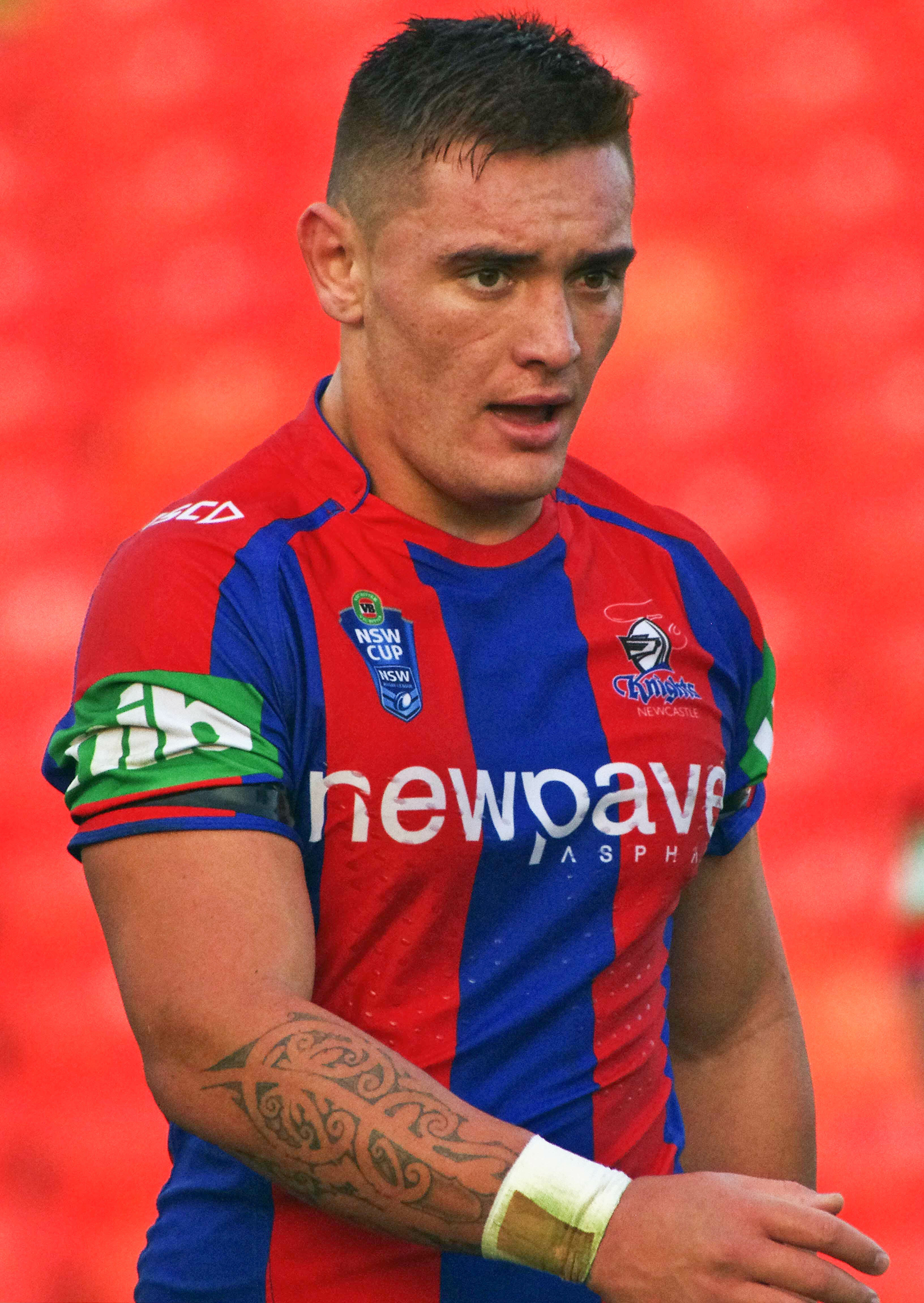
Levi playing for the Newcastle Knights in 2015

In Round 15 of the season, he made his first-grade debut for the Knights against the Cronulla-Sutherland Sharks, playing off the interchange bench in the Knights' 30-28 loss at Hunter Stadium. In Round 16 against the Brisbane Broncos, he scored his first NRL career try in the Knights' 44-22 loss at Suncorp Stadium. On 27 August, he extended his contract with the Knights to the end of 2018.

Levi played at hooker in the Knights' New South Wales Cup Grand Final win over the Wyong Roos, and the following week in the NRL State Championship Final, a 12-26 loss against the Ipswich Jets. He finished off his debut year in the NRL having played in 7 matches and scoring 2 tries for the Knights as the club finished last. He was named on the interchange bench in the 2015 NYC Team of the Year for a second year in a row.

=== 2016 ===
In February, Levi played for the Knights in the 2016 NRL Auckland Nines. In May, he was named as 19th man for New Zealand during the 2016 Anzac Test. He finished the season having played in 18 matches as the club finished last on the table. Out of 18 matches Levi played in, 17 of them ended in defeat. The other match was a 24-24 draw with the Canberra Raiders in round 3 of the competition.

=== 2017 ===
In April, Levi extended his Newcastle contract from the end of 2018 until the end of 2020.

Levi played a total of 24 games for Newcastle in the 2017 NRL season as the club finished last for a third straight year.

=== 2018 ===
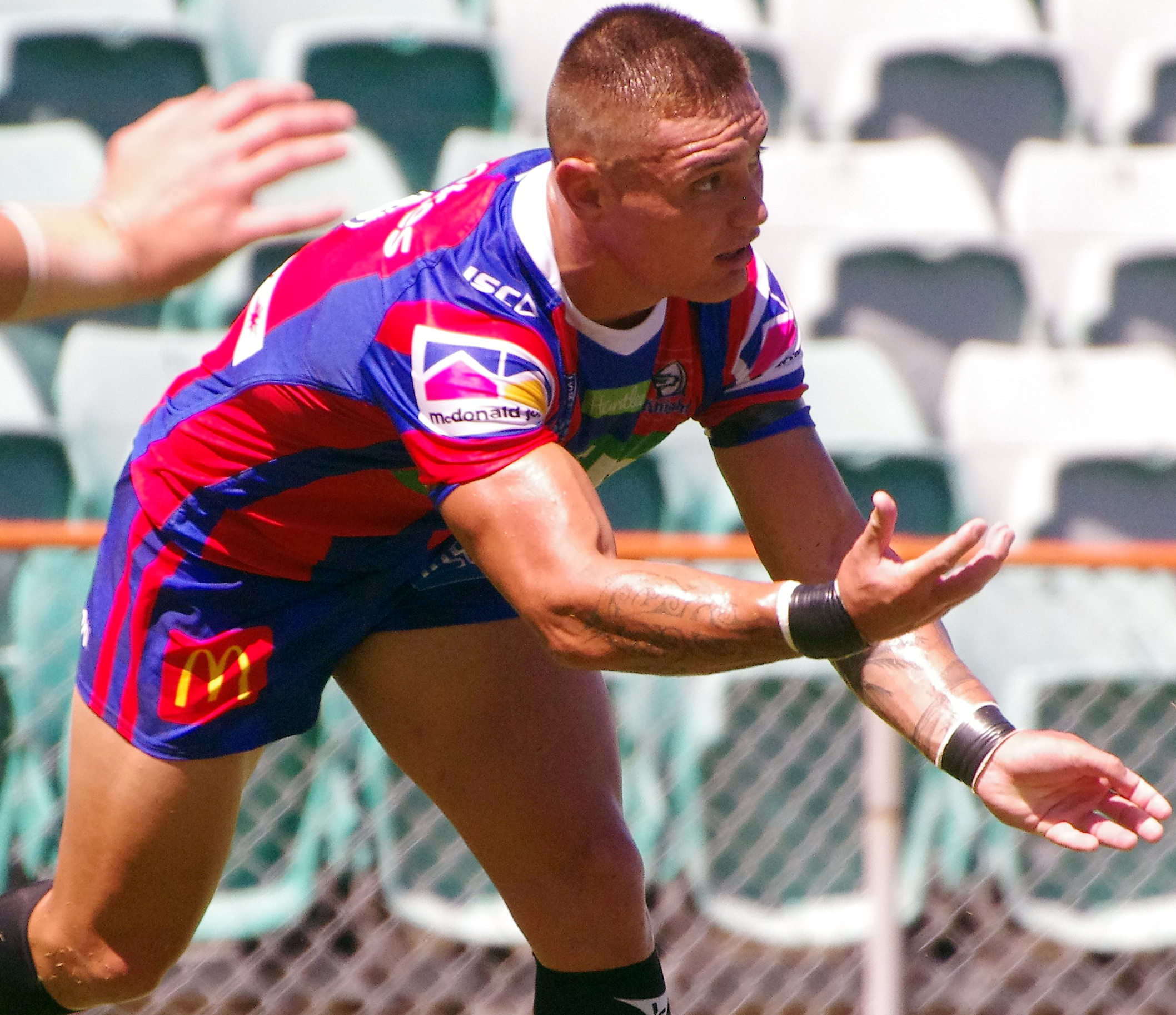
Levi playing for the Newcastle Knights in 2018

Levi played 17 games for Newcastle in the 2018 NRL season as the club improved upon the earlier three years by finishing 11th on the table.

=== 2019 ===
Levi played 17 games in the 2019 NRL season for Newcastle as the club finished 11th on the table for a second consecutive year.

=== 2020 ===
On 22 January, Levi was released by Newcastle and signed a one-year contract to join the Manly Warringah Sea Eagles for the 2020 NRL season.

On 26 February, Levi spoke to the media about his departure from Newcastle and his rocky relationship with the club's former head coaching Nathan Brown saying “It was hard, it was a bit of a rollercoaster. I thought there were things that were unfair, You hear a lot of stories where coaches that just don’t like you, no matter what you do. You could be in his bad books and that’s it. I think I might have been in a situation like that. I'm just happy to be out of it. I never have anything towards the club or the team, some of my best friends are in that team".

In round 10 against Parramatta, Levi scored his first try for Manly-Warringah as they won the match 22-18 at Brookvale Oval.

In September, Levi was informed by Manly-Warringah that his services would not be required for the 2021 season.

=== 2021 ===
On 4 February 2021 it was reported that Levi would join the Norths Devils in the Queensland Cup for the 2021 season.

On 20 April, Levi signed with the Brisbane Broncos for the remainder of the season, later that week, Levi made his club debut in round 7 against Parramatta where Brisbane lost 46-6 at TIO Stadium in Darwin. On 29 September, Levi signed a two-year deal to join English side Huddersfield.

=== 2022 ===
On 28 May, Levi played for Huddersfield in their 2022 Challenge Cup Final loss to Wigan.

In October Levi was named in the Samoa squad for the 2021 Rugby League World Cup.

=== 2023 ===
On 8 January, Levi signed a two-year deal to join Canberra ahead of the 2023 NRL season. In round 3 of the 2023 NRL season, Levi suffered a broken jaw during Canberra's 24-20 victory over Cronulla and was ruled out for an indefinite period. It was reported that trainers attempted to search for Levi's missing teeth during and after the game. Levi was limited to only four matches with Canberra in the 2023 NRL season as the club finished 8th on the table and qualified for the finals.

=== 2024 ===
Levi played 23 matches for Canberra in the 2024 NRL season as the club finished 9th on the table.

=== 2025 ===
Levi made only two appearances for Canberra in the 2025 NRL season. On 30 September, Levi was one of six players that departed the capital club at the end of their season.

On 24 November 2025 it was reported that he signed for the Leeds Rhinos. On 24 November 2025, Leeds officially confirmed the signing of Levi on a two year deal.

== Statistics ==
Year	Team	Games	Tries	Pts
2015	Newcastle Knights	7	2	8
2016	Newcastle Knights	18		
2017	Newcastle Knights	24	3	12
2018	Newcastle Knights	17		
2019	Newcastle Knights	17		
2020	Manly Warringah Sea Eagles	20	2	8
2021	Brisbane Broncos	9		
2022	Huddersfield Giants	20	4	16
2023	Canberra Raiders	4		
2024	Canberra Raiders	23	6	24
2025	Canberra Raiders	2		
2026	Leeds Rhinos	15	2	8
	Totals	186	19	76
