= James Elias =

Australian rugby league footballer (born 1993)

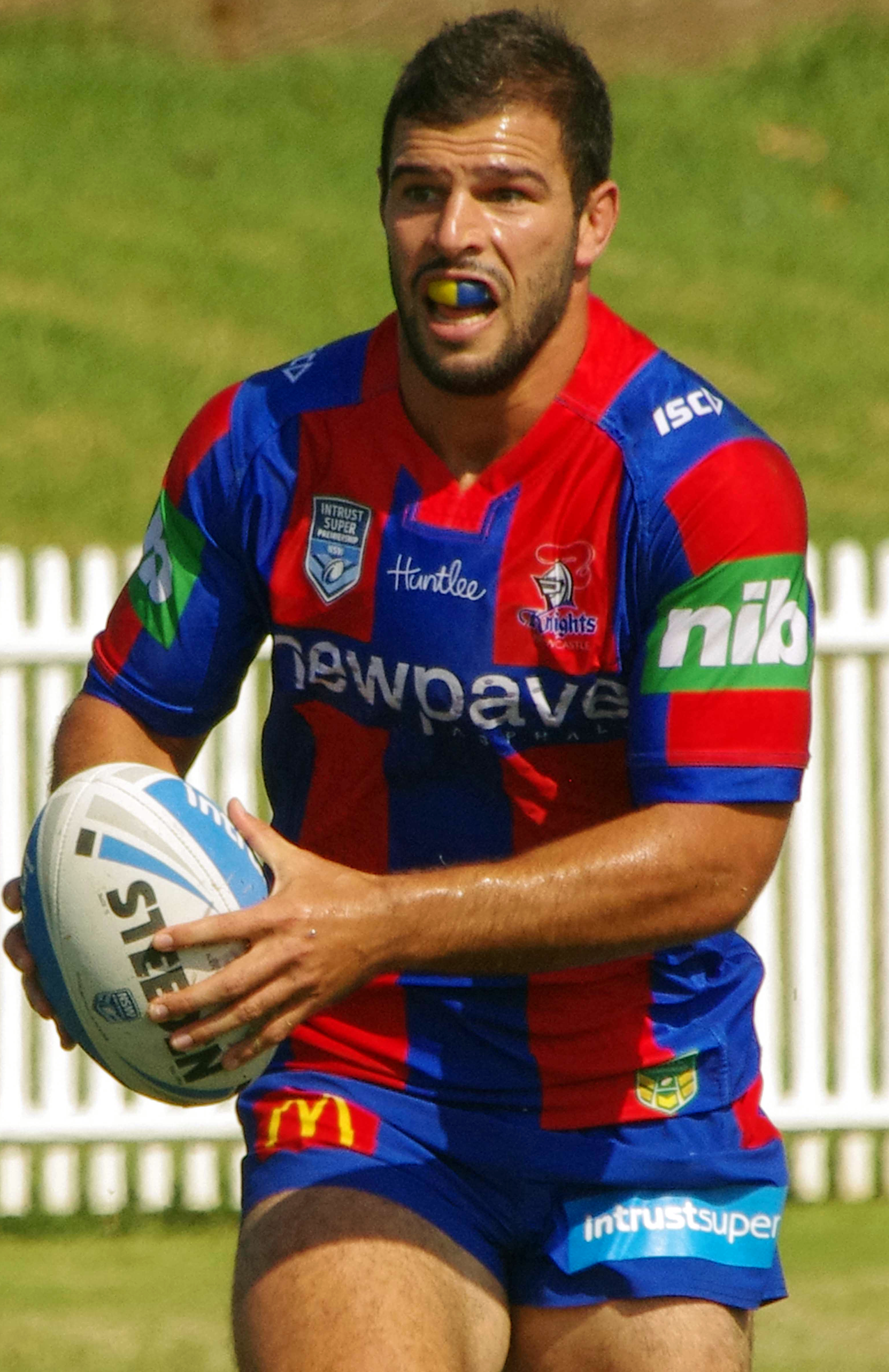

Personal information
- Born: 4 December 1993 (age 32) Sydney, New South Wales, Australia

Playing information
- Height: 178 cm (5 ft 10 in)
- Weight: 85 kg (187 lb; 13 st 5 lb)
- Position: Centre, Second-row
Representative
| Years | Team | Pld | T | G | FG | P |
|---|---|---|---|---|---|---|
| 2014–17 | Lebanon | 7 | 1 | 0 | 0 | 4 |

James Elias (born 4 December 1993) is a Lebanon international rugby league footballer. Playing as a centre or second-row, Elias represented Lebanon at the 2017 Rugby League World Cup.

From Corlette, New South Wales, Elias is a youth worker and teacher aid. He played in the NSW Cup for three seasons for the Newcastle Knights. Elias played for Western Suburbs Rosellas for two seasons (in 2017 and 2018) before leaving to pursue a career in policing.
