= Chad Redman =

Australian rugby league footballer (born 1992)

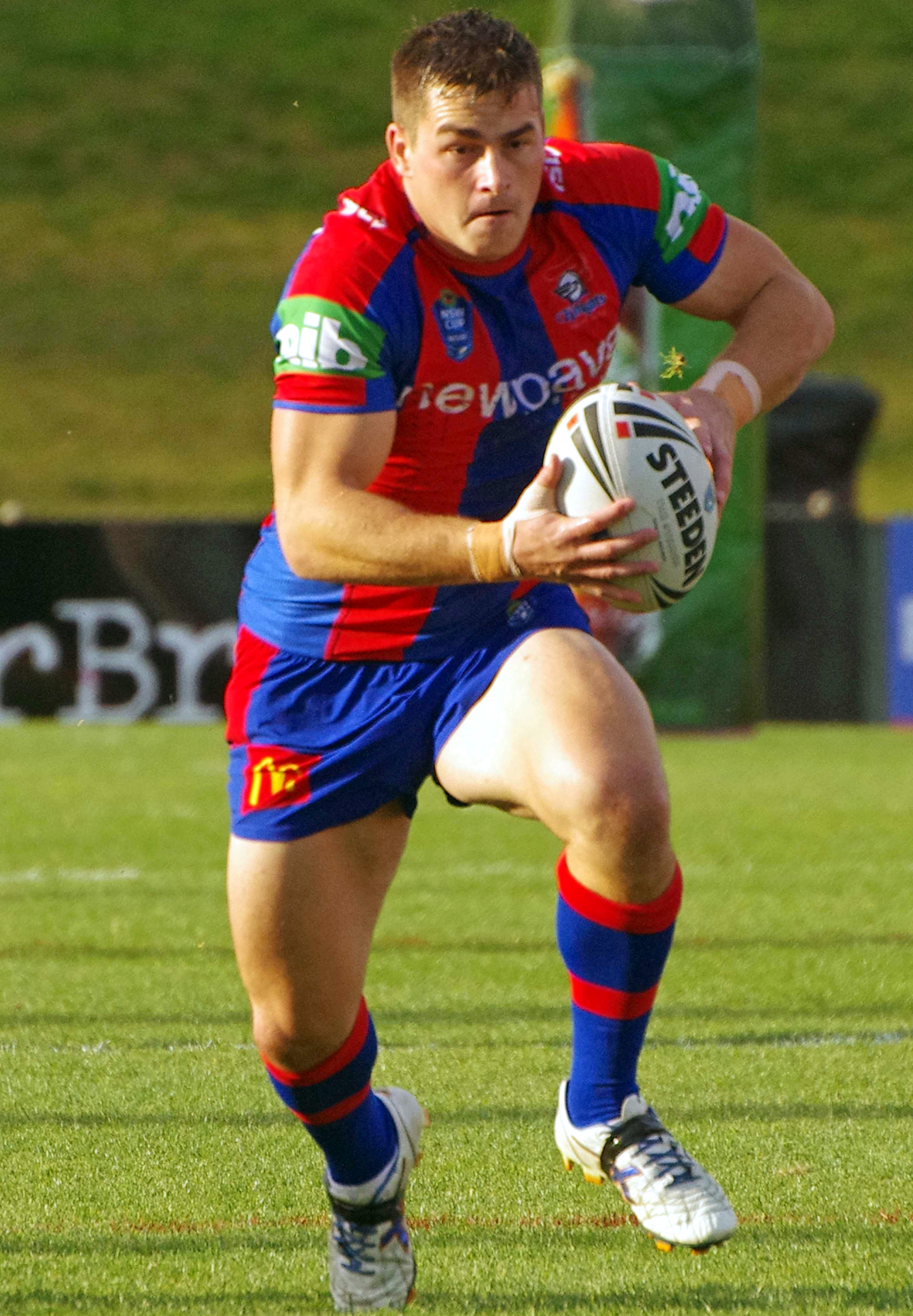

Personal information
- Born: 17 December 1992 (age 33) Newcastle, New South Wales, Australia
- Height: 175 cm (5 ft 9 in)
- Weight: 90 kg (14 st 2 lb)

Playing information
- Position: Hooker
Club
| Years | Team | Pld | T | G | FG | P |
|---|---|---|---|---|---|---|
| 2015 | Newcastle Knights | 2 | 1 | 0 | 0 | 4 |
| 2015 | Gold Coast Titans | 5 | 0 | 0 | 0 | 0 |
| | Total | 7 | 1 | 0 | 0 | 4 |
- Source: As of 11 November 2015

Chad Redman (born 17 December 1992) is a retired Australian professional rugby league footballer, He plays at hooker and previously played for the Newcastle Knights and Gold Coast Titans in the National Rugby League.

== Background ==
Born in Newcastle, New South Wales, Redman played his junior rugby league for the Western Suburbs Rosellas in the Newcastle Rugby League, before being signed by the Newcastle Knights.

== Playing career ==
=== Early career ===
In 2010, Redman played for the Australian Schoolboys. From 2010 to 2012, he played for the Newcastle Knights' NYC team, before moving on to the Knights' New South Wales Cup team in 2013.

=== 2015 ===
In round 10 of the 2015 NRL season, Redman made his NRL debut for Newcastle against the Wests Tigers, scoring a try on debut. On 16 June, he joined the Gold Coast Titans mid-season for the rest of the year to try and play regular first-grade, stating "Newcastle will always be home to me, but this was too big an opportunity to knock back. I'd be kicking myself if I did knock it back then didn't get another shot at Newcastle for the rest of the year with the line-up that they've got here and where I fit in that." He made his Gold Coast debut in Round 15 against the New Zealand Warriors. He went on to play in five games for the Gold Coast. before being released at the end of the year and signing with the Burleigh Bears in the Queensland Cup.

=== 2016 ===
In 2016, Redman opted to instead return to his junior club Western Suburbs Rosellas in the Newcastle Rugby League rather than staying with the Burleigh Bears.
