= Kade Snowden =

Australia & Italy international rugby league footballer

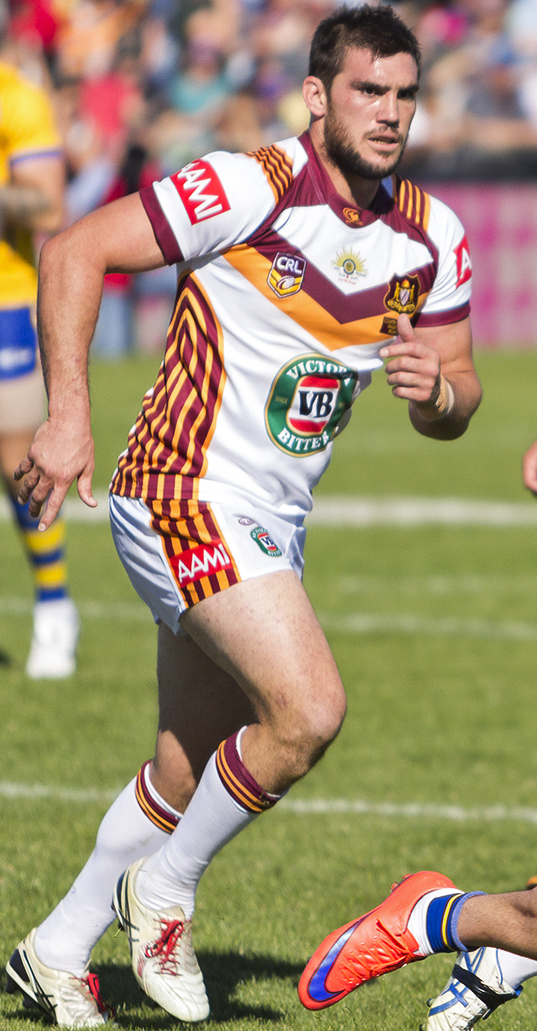

Personal information
- Born: 31 December 1986 (age 39) Belmont, New South Wales, Australia

Playing information
- Height: 186 cm (6 ft 1 in)
- Weight: 112 kg (17 st 9 lb)
- Position: Prop
Club
Years	Team	Pld	T	G	FG	P
2005–07	Newcastle Knights	14	0	0	0	0
2008–11	Cronulla Sharks	82	5	0	0	20
2012–16	Newcastle Knights	78	4	0	0	16
	Total	174	9	0	0	36
Representative
Years	Team	Pld	T	G	FG	P
2010–15	NSW Country	2	0	0	0	0
2010–11	New South Wales	2	0	0	0	0
2010	Prime Minister's XIII	1	1	0	0	4
2011	Australia	1	0	0	0	0
2012	NRL All Stars	1	0	0	0	0
2013	Italy	2	0	0	0	0

Kade Snowden (born 31 December 1986) is a former professional rugby league footballer of the Biddabah nation, who played as a prop in the 2000s and 2010s.

He began his career at the Newcastle Knights and made his first grade debut in 2005 in the opening round against the Melbourne Storm. He then signed with the Cronulla-Sutherland Sharks in 2008 and cemented a spot as a regular starter for the side. In 2010 he was rewarded with representative call ups to the NSW Country Origin and New South Wales State of Origin sides. Kade also represented his Indigenous culture through the Newcastle All Blacks in the 2022 Koori Knockout.

== Background ==
Snowden was born in Belmont, New South Wales, Australia. He is of Italian and Indigenous descent.

== Newcastle Knights ==
Snowden joined the Newcastle Knights in 2002 at the age of 15 and in his first year went on to win the Coaches Scholarship. The following year he won the Carlson Club Award as well as the SG Ball Players Player and Player of the Year awards. He was also rewarded that season with a call up to represent the NSW Combined High School Opens team, New South Wales at under-17 level and the Australian school boys side. So good was his form during that season that other clubs were already taking an interest in his services with Sydney Roosters coach Ricky Stuart trying to sign him. The following season he captained the S.G. Ball side to premiership success with a 42–16 win over South Sydney and again represented the Australian school boys side.

Snowden made his first-grade debut after coming off the bench for the Newcastle Knights on 13 March 2005 in the opening round clash against the Melbourne Storm at Olympic Park. He made his first start for the club three rounds later against the North Queensland Cowboys and went on to make another three appearances during the season as Newcastle finished last on the table. Despite signing a new two-year contract at the club in 2006 he failed to make a single appearance that year. He did, however, captain the Jersey Flegg side to the Grand Final although they came up just short after losing 22–20 to the Penrith Panthers. He made another eight appearances in 2007 but was not wanted by new coach Brian Smith and was allowed to leave the club.

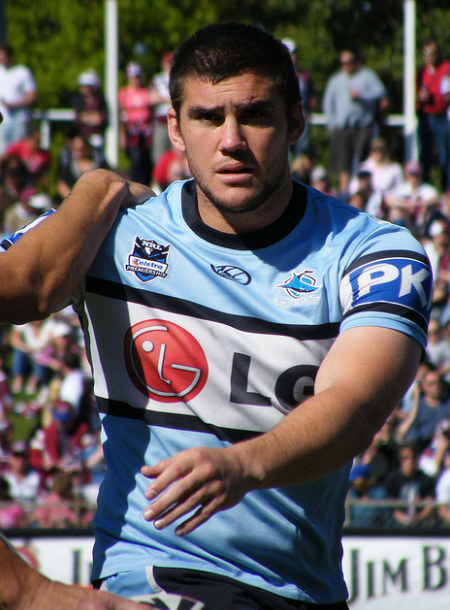
Snowden playing for the Sharks

== Cronulla-Sutherland Sharks ==
Cronulla coach Ricky Stuart signed Snowden for the 2008 NRL season as he had been an admirer ever since he had tried to sign the prop as a junior in 2003. Still with a suspension arising from a headbutting charge to serve from his time at the Knights, he made his debut for the club on 10 May in round 9 against the North Queensland Cowboys at Dairy Farmers Stadium. His first ever try came in the final round of the season as he came off the bench against North Queensland to help his side to a 28–22 win. Snowden played in Cronulla's 2008 preliminary final loss against the Melbourne Storm where they were defeated 28–0 at the Sydney Football Stadium.

2009 saw Snowden become a regular starter for the club after starting all but three games for the year. He was suspended for the round 5 clash against Canberra after he had been charged by the judiciary with a grade one dangerous contact charge for a grapple tackle against Canterbury in the 24–12 loss in the previous round. He scored a try in round 15 in the 46–12 win against an under-strength Brisbane side. He also scored a try in the final round of the season against South Sydney in the 26–24 loss. At the club's end of season awards he was honoured with the Players Player Award.

In a trial match against Manly before the 2010 NRL season, Snowden was sin binned for punching Jason King. In round 7 he scored a try in a 26–6 win against his former club Newcastle in a man of the match performance. He was rewarded for his fine form with a call up to the Country Origin side for the annual City vs Country Origin match. There were calls from coach Ricky Stuart and Queensland legend Arthur Beetson to pick Snowden for the New South Wales State of Origin side in the last match of the series which they had already lost for a fifth consecutive year. There were initial concerns over his eligibility after being placed on report by Tony Archer and later being charged by the judiciary with dangerous contact for a late hit on Jamie Soward in the 22–4 loss against St. George-Illawarra. However, with an early guilty plea Snowden was only suspended for the round 16 clash against North Queensland. However, this meant he missed his last chance to impress selectors before the side was named. Despite missing the North Queensland game, Snowden was picked for the last match and started the game as a prop. New South Wales lost the match 23–18, and henceforth the series 3–0, for the first time since 2000. In round 20 Snowden scored the first away try of his career in a 20–13 loss against Canberra.

At the end of the season, Snowden was named to play in the annual Prime Minister's XIII match against Papua New Guinea and put in a good performance capping the performance with a try.

== Return to the Knights ==
Snowden has agreed to a four-year deal with the Knights from the beginning of the 2012 season after controversially reneging on a new deal with the Sharks. Snowden had verbally agreed to re-sign with the Cronulla club but back-flipped after receiving a phone call from the new owner of the Newcastle Knights, Nathan Tinkler, whilst en route to a press conference announcing his re-signing. On 22 August 2014, Snowden became one of the current NRL players and former Sharks players to accept reduced bans from the Australian Sports Anti-Doping Authority for his role in the club's 2011 supplements program.

On 3 May 2015, Snowden played for New South Wales Country against New South Wales City in the 2015 City vs Country Origin. Snowden played 21 games for Newcastle in the 2015 NRL season as the club finished last on the table for the first time since 2005.

In August 2016, Snowden announced his retirement from rugby league due to chronic injuries that had limited him to just one game in the 2016 season. Newcastle would finish last on the table for a second consecutive season only managing to win one match.

== Statistics ==
Year	Team	Games	Tries	Pts
2005	Newcastle Knights	6		
2007	Newcastle Knights	8		
2008	Cronulla-Sutherland Sharks	17	1	4
2009	Cronulla-Sutherland Sharks	23	2	8
2010	Cronulla-Sutherland Sharks	22	2	8
2011	Cronulla-Sutherland Sharks	20		
2012	Newcastle Knights	19		
2013	Newcastle Knights	20	1	4
2014	Newcastle Knights	17		
2015	Newcastle Knights	21	3	12
2016	Newcastle Knights	1		
	Totals	174	9	36
