= Nathan Ross (rugby league) =

Australian rugby league footballer (born 1988)

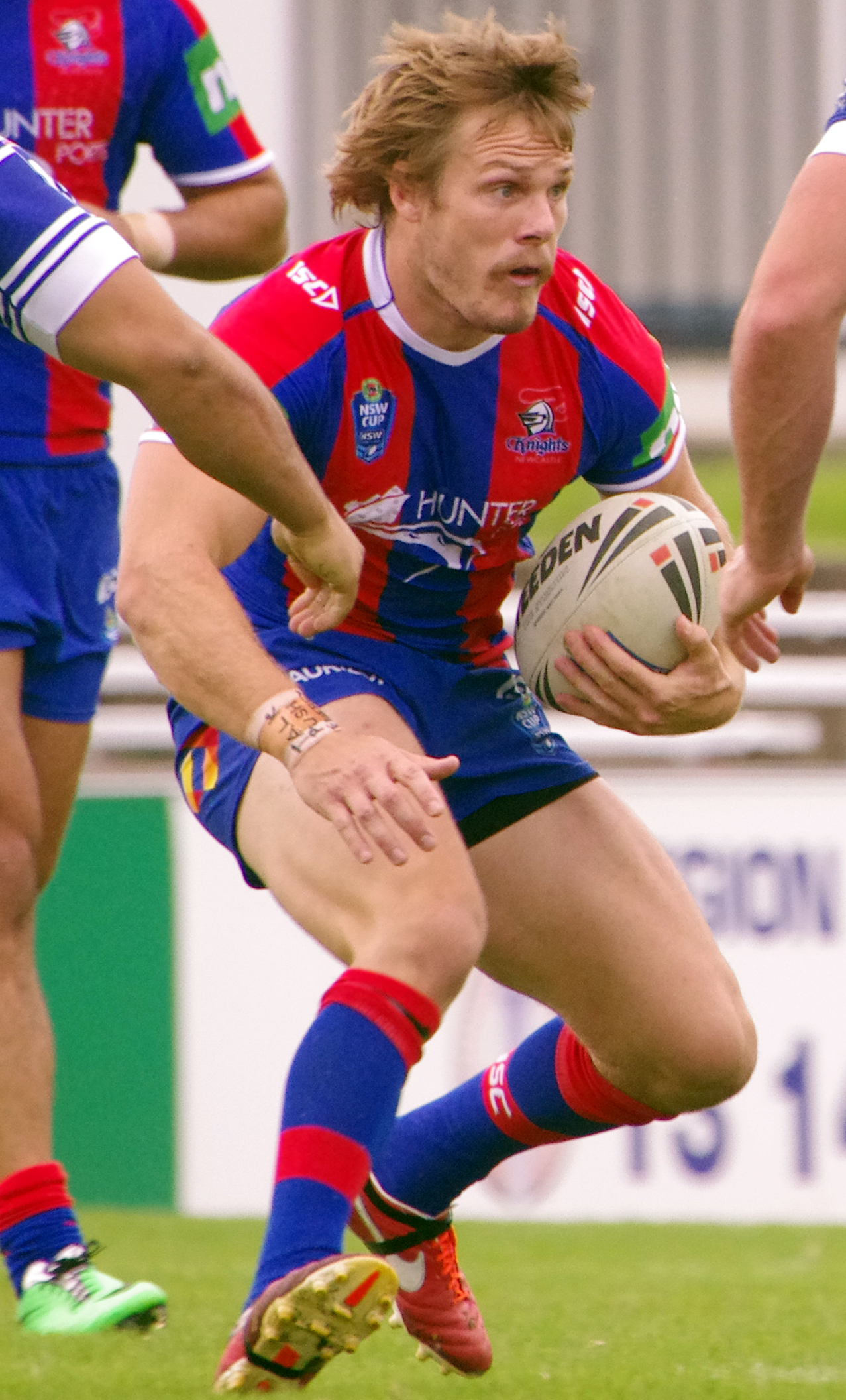

Personal information
- Born: 4 November 1988 (age 38) Gold Coast, Queensland, Australia

Playing information
- Height: 181 cm (5 ft 11 in)
- Weight: 92 kg (14 st 7 lb)
- Position: Wing, Fullback, Centre
Club
| Years | Team | Pld | T | G | FG | P |
|---|---|---|---|---|---|---|
| 2011–12 | Toulouse Olympique | 16 | 16 | 0 | 0 | 64 |
| 2015–18 | Newcastle Knights | 60 | 23 | 0 | 0 | 92 |
| | Total | 76 | 39 | 0 | 0 | 156 |
Representative
| Years | Team | Pld | T | G | FG | P |
| 2015 | NSW Residents | 1 | 0 | 0 | 0 | 0 |
| 2017 | NSW City | 1 | 0 | 0 | 0 | 0 |

Nathan Ross (born 4 November 1988), nicknamed "White Lightning" or "Ross Dog", is an Australian former professional rugby league footballer who played as a wing, fullback and centre.

He played Toulouse Olympique in the Elite One Championship and the Newcastle Knights in the NRL. He also played for New South Wales City.

== Background ==
Born on the Gold Coast, Queensland, Ross played his junior rugby league for the Burleigh Bears and Coogee Randwick Wombats.

Ross is the son of former Penrith Panthers, South Sydney Rabbitohs and Gold Coast Seagulls player Mark Ross.

== Playing career ==
=== Early career ===
In 2009, Ross played for the Tweed Heads Seagulls in the Queensland Cup, before returning to the Burleigh Bears in 2010. In 2011, he moved to Newcastle, New South Wales for work, while playing for Lakes United in the Newcastle Rugby League. In 2012, he moved to France to play for Toulouse Olympique, before returning to Lakes United later that year. His form that year, scoring 11 tries in 8 games for Lakes United, was rewarded by getting games with the Newcastle Knights' New South Wales Cup side.

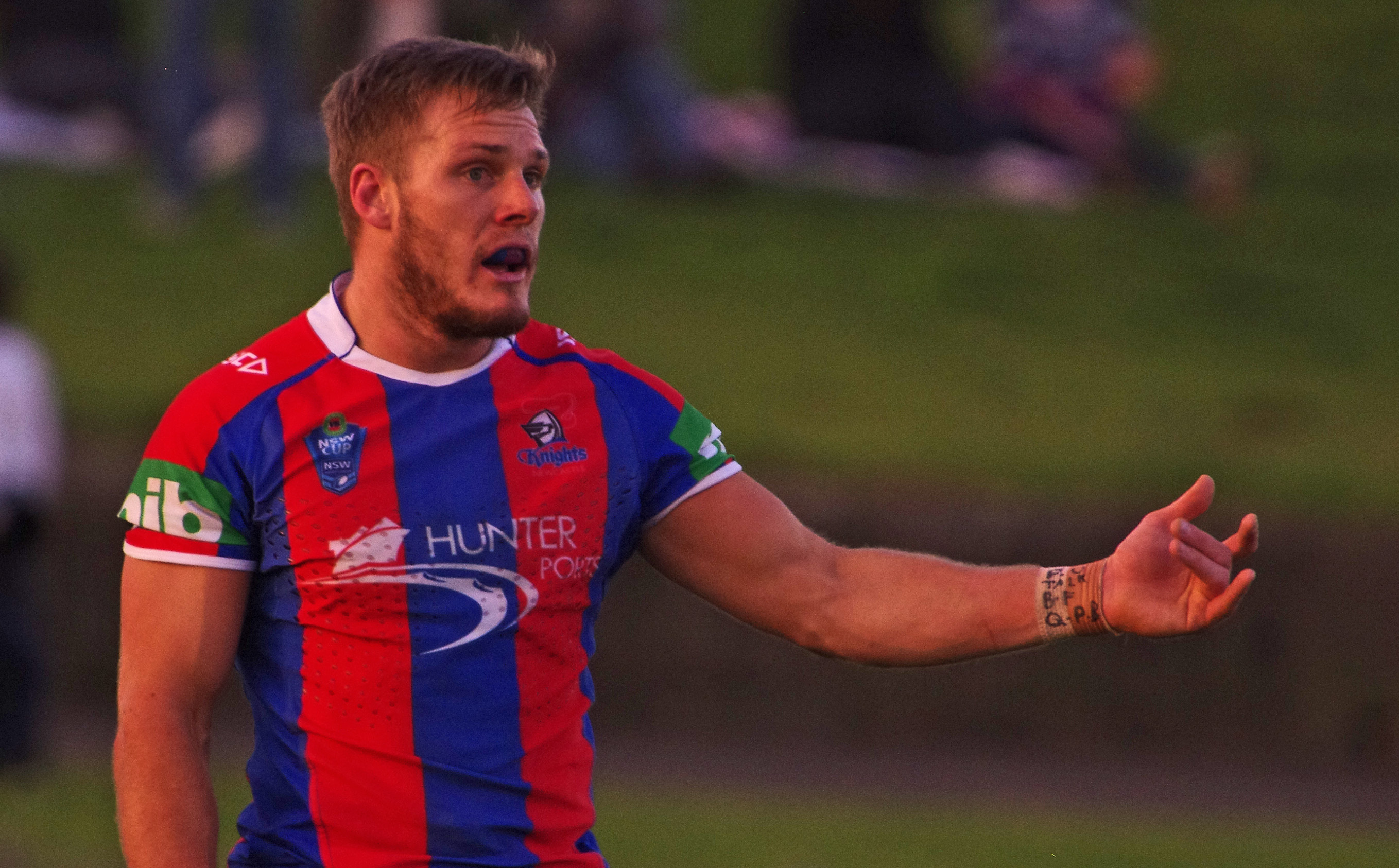
Ross playing for the Newcastle Knights

In 2013, he signed with the Western Suburbs Rosellas, before leaving without playing a match to do a pre-season with the Knights' first-grade squad. He was unsuccessful with getting a contract so signed with the Kurri Kurri Bulldogs for the 2013 season. As Kurri Kurri made their way to the 2013 Newcastle Rugby League Grand Final, he was considered "arguably the most lethal player in the competition".

In 2014, he joined the Knights' New South Wales Cup side again on a 1-year contract, as their full-time fullback. On 21 September 2014, he was named at fullback in the 2014 New South Wales Cup Team of the Year, after scoring 17 tries in 16 games that season. On 14 October 2014, he re-signed with the Knights on a 2-year contract, almost signing with the Canterbury-Bankstown Bulldogs before the Knights decided to offer him a contract.

=== 2015 ===
On 31 January and 1 February, Ross played for the Knights in the 2015 NRL Auckland Nines. On 27 April 2015, he was named as 19th man for the New South Wales Residents to play the Queensland Residents. In Round 21 of the 2015 NRL season, he made his NRL debut for the Knights against the St. George Illawarra Dragons, scoring a try on debut. He went on to play in the next remaining 5 games of the season for the Knights. Late in the year, he had his contract with the Knights upgraded for 2016, with an option for 2017.

=== 2016 ===
On 6 August, after playing in the majority of the Knights' games that season, Ross cancelled his optional contract for 2017 by re-signing with the Knights on a new 2-year contract until the end of 2018.

=== 2017 ===
In July, he had his Knights contract extended until the end of 2020.

In August he fractured his back playing against the New Zealand Warriors.

=== 2018 ===
In the 2018 season, Ross made 15 appearances and scored 2 tries as Newcastle avoided the wooden spoon for the first time in his career, but failed to reach the finals.

=== 2019 ===
Ross retired from rugby league in April 2019 after suffering irreparable damage to his pelvis. He had also suffered from a persistent groin injury and a compound dislocation to his finger during pre-season, threatening to derail his season before it had started.
