= Tyler Randell (rugby league) =

Australian rugby league footballer

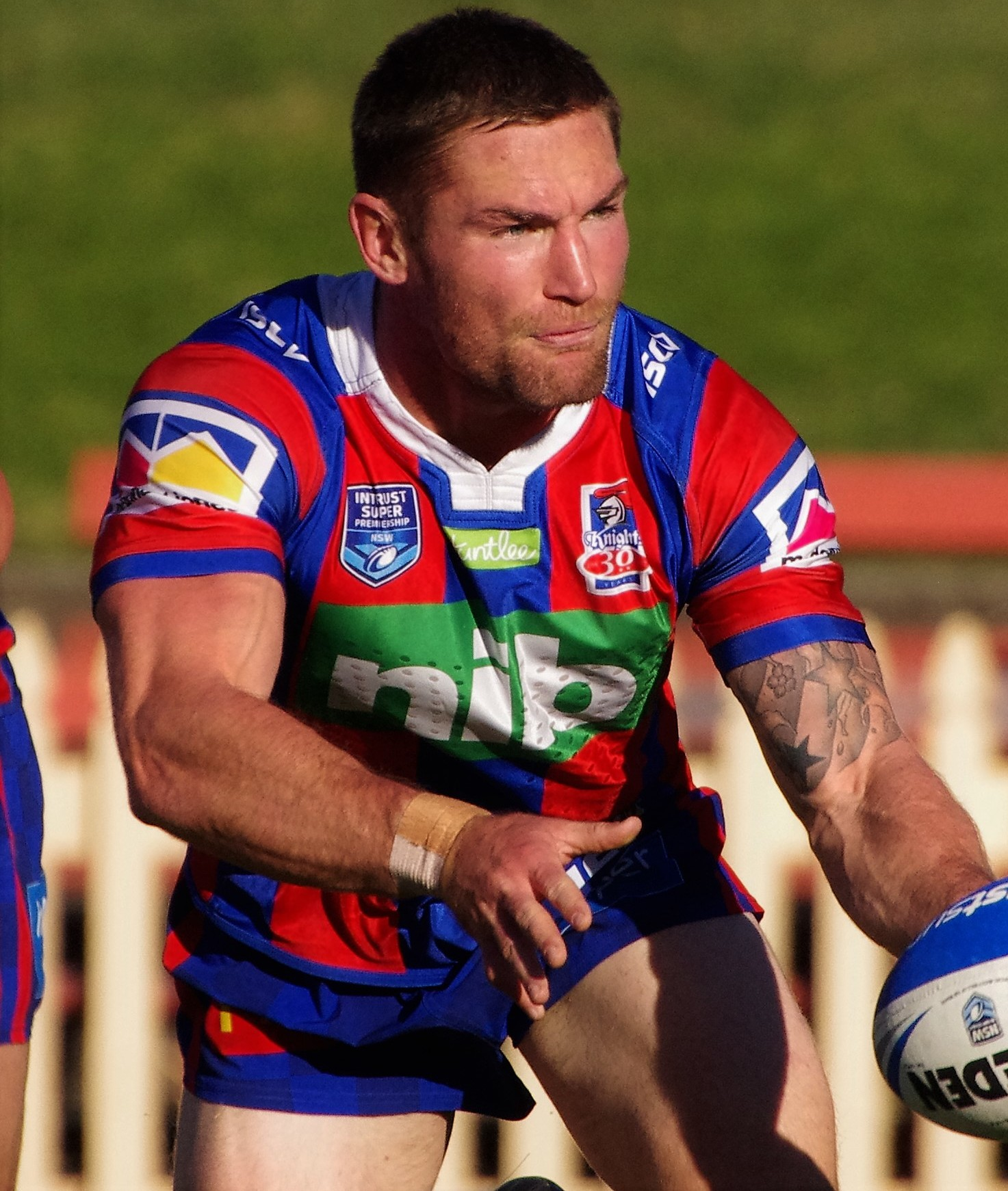

Personal information
- Born: 31 August 1992 (age 32); Scone, New South Wales, Australia
- Height: 179 cm (5 ft 10 in)
- Weight: 94 kg (14 st 11 lb)

Playing information
- Position: Hooker
Club
Years	Team	Pld	T	G	FG	P
2014–17	Newcastle Knights	44	5	2	0	24
2017–19	Wakefield Trinity	42	8	1	0	30
	Total	86	13	3	0	54
- Source: As of 14 September 2019

Tyler Randell (born 31 August 1992) is an Australian professional rugby league footballer who plays as a hooker.

He previously played for the Newcastle Knights in the NRL and for Wakefield Trinity in the Super League.

== Background ==
Randell was born in Scone, New South Wales, Australia.

He played his junior football for the Scone Thoroughbreds before switching to the Aberdeen Tigers, before being signed by the Newcastle Knights.

In 2012, Randell changed his surname from Sullivan to Randell.

== Playing career ==
=== Early career ===
From 2009 to 2012, Randell played for the Newcastle Knights' NYC team. In May 2012, he re-signed with the Newcastle club on a three-year contract.

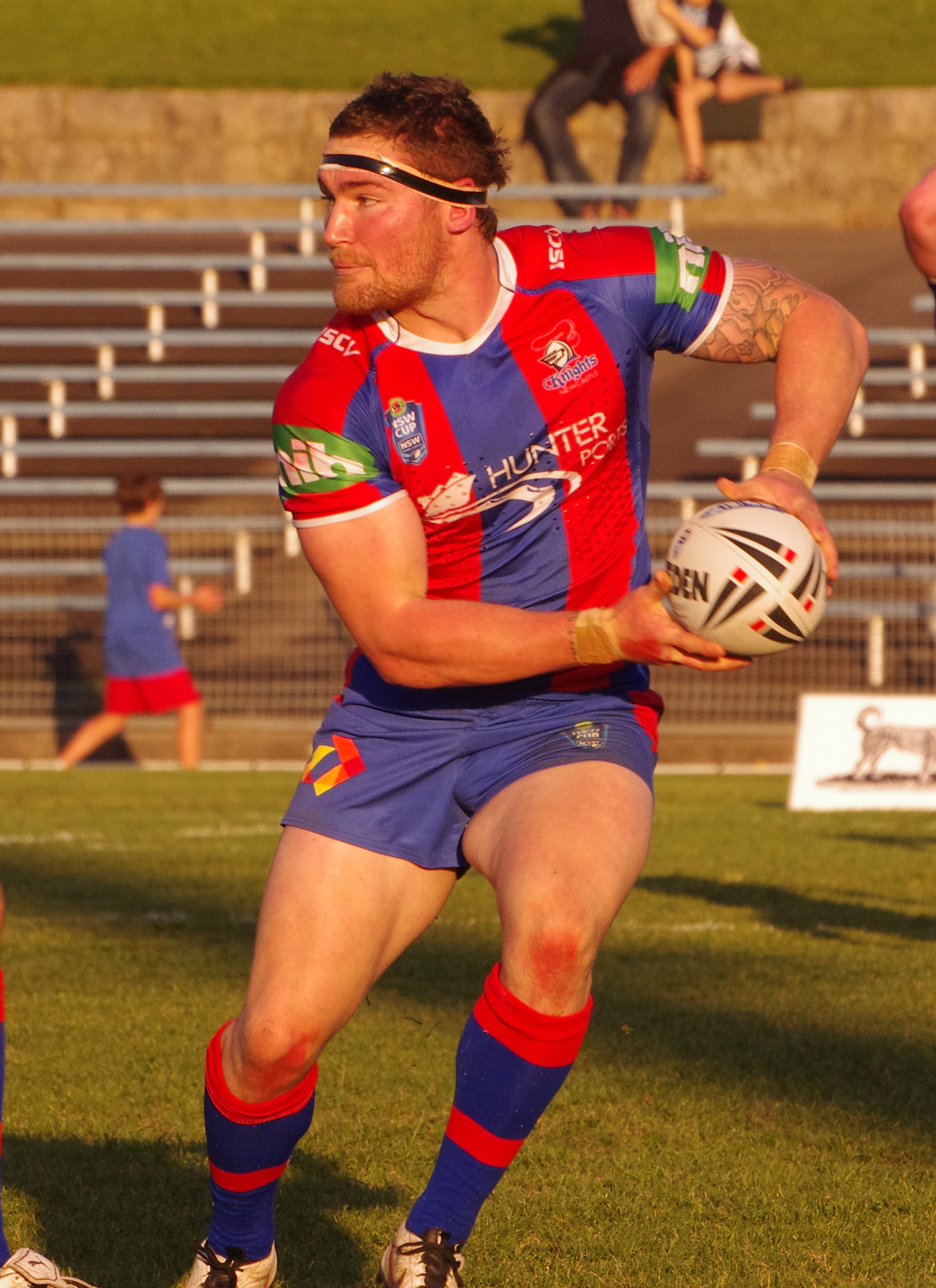
Randell playing for the Knights in 2013

In 2013, he moved on to the Knights' New South Wales Cup team.

=== 2014 ===
In 2014, he played for the New South Wales Residents team against the Queensland Residents.

In round 25 of the 2014 NRL season, Randell made his NRL debut for Newcastle against the Parramatta Eels. On 21 September 2014, he was named on the interchange bench in the 2014 New South Wales Cup Team of the Year.

=== 2015 ===
On 6 March 2015, Randell re-signed with Newcastle on a two-year contract.

=== 2016 ===
In February, Randell co-captained Newcastle in the 2016 NRL Auckland Nines.

=== 2017 ===
In July, he signed a two-year contract with Super League side Wakefield Trinity, starting in 2018, however in August, he was allowed to join Wakefield early after being granted a release by the Newcastle club.
