= 2024 Newcastle Rugby League Season =

The 2024 Newcastle Rugby League was a competition to determine the best semi-professional rugby league team in Newcastle, New South Wales, Australia. Season 2024 saw Maitland Pickers defeat Central Newcastle in the First Grade Grand Final, 24–4. This was Maitland's 15th premiership in the competition's history. Central Newcastle appeared in their first Grand Final since 1963, breaking a 49-year drought. The inaugural Women's Premiership was also contested in 2024, with Maitland Pickers Women's team claiming the title. The official Newcastle Rugby League commentary team consisted of Tony Delaney and Peter Jolly, delivering expert analysis and post-game interviews.

== First Grade (Newcastle Rugby League) ==
This season featured the same 11 teams as the 2023 season.

2024 Denton Engineering Cup
- Duration: 13 April – 29 September 2024
- Teams: 11
- Premiers: Maitland Pickers
- Minor premiers: Maitland Pickers
- Broadcast partners: Bar TV Sports

=== Teams ===
Colours	Club	Home ground(s)	Head coach
	Central Newcastle Butcher Boys	St John Oval	Adam Bettridge
	Cessnock Goannas	Baddeley Park	Harry Siejka
	Kurri Kurri Bulldogs	Kurri Kurri Sports Ground	Rip Taylor
	Lakes United Seagulls	Cahill Oval	Ian Bourke
	Macquarie Scorpions	Lyall Peacock Field	Jye Bailey
	Maitland Pickers	Maitland Sportsground	Matt Lantry
	Northern Hawks	Tomaree Sports Ground	Brad Tighe
	South Newcastle Lions	Townson Oval	Andrew Ryan
	The Entrance Tigers	EDSACC Oval	Jamie Forbes
	Western Suburbs Rosellas	Harker Oval	Rick Stone
	Wyong Roos	Morry Breen Oval	Mitch Williams

=== Team of the Year ===
The Newcastle Rugby League announced the official Team of the Year and Player of the Year.

- Fullback – Lewis Young
- Winger – Honeti Tuha
- Centre – Matt Soper-Lawler
- Five-Eighth – Ryan Glanville
- Halfback – Bayden Searle
- Prop – Jake Woods
- Hooker – Mitch Black
- Second Row – Henry Penn
- Lock – Sam Anderson
- Coach – Adam Bettridge
- Player of the Year – Mitch Black

Other category winners were also announced:

- Rookie of the Year - Beau Slade
- Try of the Year - James Bradley
- Representative Player of the Year - James Taylor
- Leading pointscorer - Mitch Black
- Leading tryscorer - Ty Fletcher

LeagueCastle provides official statistics for the Newcastle Rugby League competition.

- Most try assists - Ryan Glanville (21)
- Most line-break assists - Ryan Glanville (27)
- Most tackles - Connor Kirkwood (665)
- Most line breaks - Mapu Uasi (20)
- Most metres run - Connor Kirkwood (3596m)
- Most tackle breaks - Luke Sharpe (90)

Running a Dally-M Style voting competition based on best statistical performances (3/2/1 point votes per game), Leaguecastle announced their 2024 Newcastle Rugby League Team of the Year 1 and 2 as follows:

==== LeagueCastle Team of the Year ====
- Joint Player/Stat Man of the Year – Connor Kirkwood & Tony Pellow.
- Fullback – Tony Pellow
- Wingers – Honeti Tuha & Mapu Uasi
- Centres – Matt Soper-Lawler & Kain Anderson
- Five-Eighth – Ryan Glanville
- Halfback – Sam Clune
- Hooker – Mitch Black
- Props – Jayden Butterfield & Jake Woods
- Second Rows – Wyatt Shaw & Jack Welsh
- Lock – Connor Kirkwood
- Coach (most players to register at least 1 vote) – Matt Lantry
- Bench – Cameron Anderson, Reeve Howard, Luke Sharpe, Lewis Young, Alex Langbridge.

==== LeagueCastle Team of the Year 2 ====
- Fullback – Matt Cooper
- Wingers – Ty Fletcher & Mao Uta
- Centres – Grant Nelson & Brayden Musgrove
- Five-Eighth – Ryan Potts
- Halfback – Nick Newman
- Props – David Fifita & James Taylor
- Hooker – Mitch Williams
- Second Rows – Malik Deyaolu & Ethan Campbell
- Lock – Ben Stone (Western Suburbs Rosellas)
- Bench - Logan Radzievic, Isaiah Olsen, Manu Alexander, Harvey Neville, Nick Glohe

=== Ladder ===
Pos	Team	Pld	W	D	L	B	PF	PA	PD	Pts
1	Maitland Pickers	16	14	1	1	2	500	190	+310	33
2	South Newcastle Lions	16	12	0	4	2	530	294	+236	28
3	Central Newcastle Butcher Boys	16	11	0	5	2	447	256	+191	26
4	The Entrance Tigers	16	10	2	4	2	484	304	+180	26
5	Cessnock Goannas	16	9	3	4	2	402	286	+116	25
6	Wyong Roos	16	9	0	7	2	371	332	+39	22
7	Western Suburbs Rosellas	16	7	1	8	2	388	344	+44	19
8	Lakes United Seagulls	16	5	1	10	2	406	383	+23	15
9	Northern Hawks	16	4	1	11	2	264	462	–198	13
10	Macquarie Scorpions	16	2	0	14	2	190	652	-462	8
11	Kurri Kurri Bulldogs	16	0	1	15	2	224	703	–479	5

Updated to match(es) played on unknown. Source: https://www.playrugbyleague.com/Competitions/Competition/2024-denton-engineering-cup-50216973?round=22
Rules for classification: 1) points; 2) point difference; 3) points scored

==== Round 1 ====
Stat Definitions: LB (Line Breaks), TB (Tackle Breaks), LBA (LB Assists), TA (Try Assists), M (Metres), CAR (Carries), TCK (Tackles), OL (Offloads), FDO (Forced Drop Out), TC (Try Contribution), LBC (LB Contribution).

Home	Score	Away	Match Information
Home	Score	Away	Date	Venue	LeagueCastle's Man of the Match (and Stats)
The Entrance Tigers	28 – 24	Lakes United	Saturday, 13 April	Newcastle No. 2 Sportsground	Cahleb Faulkner (3 Tries, 2 LB, 10 TB, 111m)
Wyong Roos	25 – 24	Kurri Kurri Bulldogs	Saturday, 13 April	Newcastle No. 2 Sportsground	Connor Kirkwood (30 TCK, 29 CAR 235m)
Northern Hawks	10 – 20	Maitland Pickers	Saturday, 13 April	Newcastle No. 2 Sportsground	Sam Anderson (1 Try, 13 CAR, 120m, 20 TCK, 1 LB)
Macquarie Scorpions	6 – 26	Cessnock Goannas	Saturday, 13 April	Newcastle No. 2 Sportsground	Harvey Neville (1 Try, 106m, 1 TA, 1 LBA, 1 LB).
Western Suburbs Rosellas	8 – 22	Central Newcastle Butcher Boys	Saturday, 13th April	Newcastle No. 2 Sportsground	Brock Greacen (21 CAR, 179m, 2 TB, 24 TCK)
South Newcastle Lions		BYE

==== Round 2 ====
Home	Score	Away	Match Information
Home	Score	Away	Date	Venue	LeagueCastle's Man of the Match (and Stats)
Lakes United	12 – 12	Western Suburbs Rosellas	Saturday, 20 April	Cahill Oval	Heath Gibbs (181m, 19 CAR, 1 LB, 4 TB, 1 TA)
Maitland Pickers	20 – 0	Kurri Kurri Bulldogs	Saturday, 20 April	Maitland No. 1 Sportsground	Brock Lamb (1 Try, 2 TA, 2 LBA, 5 FDO)
Wyong Roos	0 – 6	The Entrance Tigers	Saturday, 20 April	Morry Breen Oval	Jake Woods (169m, 21 CAR, 45 TCK, 4 TB)
Macquarie Scorpions	34 – 20	Northern Hawks	Sunday, 28 April	Lyall Peacock Field	Jake Self (1 TA, 1 LBA, 2 TC, 1 LBC, 1 FDO 90% D).
South Newcastle Lions	24 – 6	Central Newcastle Butcher Boys	Sunday, 28th April	Townson Oval	Sam Clune (1 Try, 1 TC, 1 LBC, 2 LBA, 2 LB, 4 TB, 1 FDO, 25 TCK 100% D)
Cessnock Goannas		BYE

==== Round 3 ====
Home	Score	Away	Match Information
Home	Score	Away	Date	Venue	LeagueCastle's Man of the Match (and Stats)
Central Newcastle Butcher Boys	38 – 10	Macquarie Scorpions	Thursday, 25 April	St. John Oval	Ty Fletcher (3 Tries, 2 LB, 2 TB, 91m)
South Newcastle Lions	56 – 14	Kurri Kurri Bulldogs	Thursday, 25 April	Townson Oval	Mitch Black (2 Tries, 1 TA, 2 TC, 2 LBC, 1 LBA, 3 TB, 28 TCK 100% D)
Cessnock Goannas	44 – 6	Northern Hawks	Thursday, 25 April	Baddeley Park	Angus Ernst (2 TA, 2 TC, 2 LBA, 2 LBC, 1 FDO, 87% D)
Lakes United	20 – 14	Wyong Roos	Sunday, 28 April	Cahill Oval	Dylan Phythian (2 Tries, 1 TA, 1 TC, 1 LBA, 2 LB, 8 TB, 1 40/20, 100% D).
Western Suburbs Rosellas	36 – 30	Maitland Pickers	Sunday, 28 April	Harker Oval	Luke Walsh (3 TA, 3 LBA)
The Entrance Tigers		BYE

==== Round 4 ====
Home	Score	Away	Match Information
Home	Score	Away	Date	Venue	LeagueCastle's Man of the Match (and Stats)
Cessnock Goannas	12 – 12	Maitland Pickers	Saturday, 4 May	Baddeley Park	Wyatt Shaw (55 Tackles, 96% D, 1 Forced Error, 12 CAR, 97m)
Kurri Kurri Bulldogs	18 – 30	Lakes United	Saturday, 4 May	Kurri Kurri Sports Ground	Peter Mata'utia (2 LBA, 1 TA, 1 TC, 4 TB, 2 OL, 12 CAR, 124m, 24 TCK, 89% D)
Northern Hawks	12 – 22	Wyong Roos	Saturday, 4 May	Morry Breen Oval	Luke Sharpe (2 TC, 1 LBC, 1 LBA, 5 TB, 2 OL, 16 CAR, 151m)
Western Suburbs Rosellas	20 – 12	The Entrance Tigers	Sunday, 5 May	Baddeley Park	Kiah Cooper (1 Try, 1 TA, 1 LBA, 1 LB, 7 TB, 115m).
Macquarie Scorpions	8 – 24	South Newcastle Lions	Sunday, 18 May	Lyall Peacock Field	Mitch Black (3 TA, 3 LBA, 1 LBC, 1 FDO, 3 TB, 39 TCK, 98% D)
Central Newcastle Butcher Boys		BYE

==== Round 5 ====
Home	Score	Away	Match Information
Home	Score	Away	Date	Venue	LeagueCastle's Man of the Match (and Stats)
Western Suburbs Rosellas	34 – 4	Northern Hawks	Saturday, 11 May	Lakeside Sporting Complex	Will Smith (2 FDO, 1 TA, 1 TC, 1 LBA, 1 LBC, 1 LB, 2 TB, 14.8m a run)
Maitland Pickers	34 – 12	Lakes United	Saturday, 11 May	Maitland No. 1 Sportsground	Matt Soper-Lawler (2 TA, 2 LBA, 3 TB, 10 CAR, 80m, 3 Forced Errors)
Wyong Roos	16 – 18	South Newcastle Lions	Saturday, 11 May	Morry Breen Oval	Frank-Paul Nu'uausala (1 Try, 3 OL, 1 LB, 3 TB, 170m, 18 CAR, 21 TCK, 91% D)
Central Newcastle Butcher Boys	16 – 26	Cessnock Goannas	Sunday, 12 May	Baddeley Park	Honeti Huha (2 Tries, 2 LB, 11 TB, 219m, 18 CAR)
The Entrance Tigers	62 – 10	Kurri Kurri Bulldogs	Sunday, 12 May	Maitland No. 1 Sportsground	Myles Lee-Taueli (2 Tries, 7 TB, 2 LB, 1 TA, 183m, 16 CAR, 21 TCK, 95% D)
Macquarie Scorpions		BYE

==== Round 6 ====
Home	Score	Away	Match Information
Home	Score	Away	Date	Venue	LeagueCastle's Man of the Match (and Stats)
Kurri Kurri Bulldogs	28 – 28	Cessnock Goannas	Saturday, 25 May	Kurri Kurri Sports Ground	Connor Kirkwood (30 CAR, 244m, 38 TCK 98% D, 1 FDO)
Maitland Pickers	30 – 14	Wyong Roos	Saturday, 25 May	Maitland No. 1 Sportsground	James Taylor (32 TCK, 19 CAR, 213m, 1 LB, 3 TB)
Northern Hawks	6 – 16	Central Newcastle Butcher Boys	Saturday, 25 May	Tomaree Sports Ground	Tyrone Nean (2 Tries, 1 LB, 1 TA, 2 LBA, 101m, 94% D)
Macquarie Scorpions	22 – 42	Western Suburbs Rosellas	Sunday, 26 May	Lyall Peacock Field	Kiah Cooper (3 Tries, 7 TB, 3 LB, 1 LBA, 1 TC, 157m, 12 CAR)
The Entrance Tigers	22 – 26	South Newcastle Lions	Sunday, 26 May	EDSACC Oval North	Tony Pellow (3 TA, 1 TC, 3 LBA, 1 LBC, 6 TB, 1 FDO, 145m, 14 CAR)
Lakes United		BYE

==== Round 7 ====
Home	Score	Away	Match Information
Home	Score	Away	Date	Venue	LeagueCastle's Man of the Match (and Stats)
Cessnock Goannas	30 – 12	South Newcastle Lions	Saturday, 1 June	Baddeley Park	Lewis Young (1 Try, 1 TA, 1 LBA, 4 LB, 9 TB, 176M, 13 CAR)
Kurri Kurri Bulldogs	12 – 24	Macquarie Scorpions	Saturday, 1 June	Kurri Kurri Sportsground	Connor Kirkwood (51 TCK, 93% D, 35 CAR, 287m)
The Entrance Tigers	8 – 18	Maitland Pickers	Tuesday, 4 June	EDSACC South	Luke Knight (2 Tries, 3 LB, 2 TB, 115m)
Western Suburbs Rosellas	16 – 22	Wyong Roos	Thursday, 6 June	Morry Breen Oval	Isaac Blackhall (1 Try, 2 LB, 6 TB, 1 TA, 1 LBA, 1 TC, 141m, 13 CAR, 100% D)
Lakes United	24 – 26	Central Newcastle Butcher Boys	Saturday, 10 August	Cahill Oval	Nick Glohe (2 Tries, 2 LB, 7 TB, 111m, 28 TCK, 93% D)
Northern Hawks		BYE

==== Round 8 ====
Home	Score	Away	Match Information
Home	Score	Away	Date	Venue	LeagueCastle's Man of the Match (and Stats)
Lakes United	20 – 30	The Entrance Tigers	Saturday, 8 June	Cahill Oval	Tony Pellow (4 Tries, 1 TA, 1 LBA, 5 LB, 8 TB, 315m, 12 CAR)
Maitland Pickers	50 – 14	Northern Hawks	Saturday, 8 June	Maitland No.1 Sportsground	Jackson Eckford (Debut) (3 Tries, 4 LB, 4 TB, 112m)
Cessnock Goannas	20 – 18	Macquarie Scorpions	Saturday, 8 June	Lakeside Sporting Complex	Honeti Tuha (2 Tries, 1 LB, 6 TB, 1 OL, 205m, 15 CAR)
Central Newcastle Butcher Boys	24 – 22	South Newcastle Lions	Wednesday, 12 June	St. John Oval	Kain Anderson (1 Try, 1 LB, 5 TB, 1 LBA, 1 TA, 101m)
Northern Hawks	Kurri Kurri Bulldogs	Western Suburbs Rosellas		BYE

==== Round 9 ====
Home	Score	Away	Match Information
Home	Score	Away	Date	Venue	LeagueCastle's Man of the Match (and Stats)
Cessnock Goannas	26 – 12	Lakes United	Saturday, 15 June	Howe Park	Harvey Neville (1 Try, 1 LB, 4 TB, 1 TA, 162m, 15 CAR, 94% D)
Kurri Kurri Bulldogs	22 – 54	The Entrance Tigers	Saturday, 15 June	Kurri Kurri Sportsground	Tony Pellow (2 Tries, 5 LBA, 5 TB, 1 TA, 1 TC, 117m, 9 CAR)
South Newcastle Lions	38 – 8	Wyong Roos	Saturday, 16 June	Townson Oval	Mapu Uasi (4 Tries, 4 LB, 6 TB, 1 TA, 133m)
Macquarie Scorpions	0 – 50	Central Newcastle Butcher Boys	Tuesday, 18 June	St. John Oval	Cameron Anderson (2 Tries, 2 TA, 1 TC, 1 LBA, 1 LBC, 3 LB, 6 TB, 113m)
Northern Hawks	14 – 12	Western Suburbs Rosellas	Sunday, 11 August	Tomaree Sports Ground	Henry Penn (1 Try, 4 OL, 6 TB, 20 CAR, 173m, 24 TCK, 96% D)
Maitland Pickers		BYE

==== Round 10 ====
Home	Score	Away	Match Information
Home	Score	Away	Date	Venue	LeagueCastle's Man of the Match (and Stats)
South Newcastle Lions	62 – 10	Macquarie Scorpions	Saturday, 22 June	Townson Oval	Reeve Howard (1 Try, 4 LB, 4 TB, 3 LBA, 3 TA, 1 TC, 195m)
Lakes United	62 – 10	Kurri Kurri Bulldogs	Saturday, 22 June	Cahill Oval	Matt Cooper (2 Tries, 10 TB, 3 LB, 3 TA, 1 LBA, 171m)
Maitland Pickers	44 – 6	Cessnock Goannas	Saturday, 22 June	Maitland No. 1 Sportsground	Matt Soper-Lawler (1 Try, 4 TA, 3 LBA, 1 LB, 3 TB, 106m)
The Entrance Tigers	30 – 16	Western Suburbs Rosellas	Sunday, 23 June	EDSACC South	Nick Newman (2 Tries, 1 TA, 1 LBA, 3 LB, 8 TB, 15.8m a run)
Northern Hawks	14 – 36	Wyong Roos	Wednesday, 3 July	Tomaree Sports Ground	Bayden Searle (2 Tries, 3 TA, 1 LBA, 2 LB, 1 FDO)
Central Newcastle Butcher Boys		BYE

==== Round 11 ====
Home	Score	Away	Match Information
Home	Score	Away	Date	Venue	LeagueCastle's Man of the Match (and Stats)
Maitland Pickers	20 – 8	Western Suburbs Rosellas	Saturday, 29 June	Maitland No.1 Sportsground	Jayden Butterfield (1 LB, 6 TB, 188m, 17 CAR, 25 TCK, 93% D)
Northern Hawks	24 – 46	South Newcastle Lions	Saturday, 29 June	Tomaree Sports Ground	Ryan Glanville (1 Try, 4 TA, 1 TC, 3 LBA, 2 LBC, 5 TB)
Macquarie Scorpions	16 – 28	The Entrance Tigers	Sunday, 30 June	Lyall Peacock Field	Tony Pellow (1 Try, 1 TA, 2 LBA, 1 LBC, 2 LB, 5 TB, 116m, 10 CAR)
Central Newcastle Butcher Boys	34 – 4	Kurri Kurri Bulldogs	Sunday, 30 June	St. John Oval	Connor Kirkwood (35 CAR, 316m, 57 TCK, 98% D)
Cessnock Goannas	4 – 12	Wyong Roos	Wednesday, 3 July	Tomaree Sports Ground	Jake O'Meley (39 TCK, 93% D, 116m, 12 CAR)
Lakes United		BYE

==== Round 12 ====
Home	Score	Away	Match Information
Home	Score	Away	Date	Venue	LeagueCastle's Man of the Match (and Stats)
The Entrance Tigers	44 – 26	Wyong Roos	Saturday, 31 August	EDSAAC South	David Fifita (2 Tries, 2 LB, 9 TB, 1 LBA, 1 OL, 161m, 16 CAR, 100% D)
Macquarie Scorpions	0 – 32	Maitland Pickers	Saturday, 31 August	Lyall Peacock Field	Macquarie Scorpions Forfeit
South Newcastle Lions	24 – 32	Cessnock Goannas	Saturday, 31 August	Townson Oval	Hayden Regan (1 Try, 2 LB, 3 TB, 1 TA, 25 TCK, 93% D)
Western Suburbs Rosellas	28 – 24	Lakes United	Saturday, 31 August	Harker Oval	Liam Wiscombe (1 TC, 1 LBC, 122m, 12 CAR, 19 TCK, 100% D)
Central Newcastle Butcher Boys	44 – 6	Northern Hawks	Saturday, 31 August	St. John Oval	Kain Anderson (2 Tries, 3 LB, 7 TB, 2 LBA, 2 TA, 138m, 11 CAR)
Kurri Kurri Bulldogs		BYE

==== Round 13 ====
Home	Score	Away	Match Information
Home	Score	Away	Date	Venue	LeagueCastle's Man of the Match (and Stats)
South Newcastle Lions	38 – 18	Lakes United	Saturday, 13 July	Townson Oval	Reeve Howard (1 Try, 3 LB, 7 TB, 3 TA, 1 TC, 2 LBA, 1 LBC, 181m, 12 CAR)
Kurri Kurri Bulldogs	20 – 36	Northern Hawks	Saturday, 13 July	Kurri Kurri Sportsground	Liam Walsh (1 Try, 1 TA, 1 TC, 1 LBA, 1 LBC, 2 LB, 3 TB, 2 OL, 129m, 32 TCK, 100% D)
Maitland Pickers	26 – 24	Central Newcastle Butcher Boys	Saturday, 13 July	Maitland No. 1 Sportsground	Matt Soper-Lawler (1 TA, 1 LB, 7 TB, 196m, 13 CAR)
Wyong Roos	38 – 10	Macquarie Scorpions	Saturday, 13 July	Morry Breen Oval	Tarnae Mahon (2 Tries, 2 LB, 4 TB, 2 LBA, 1 TC, 23 TCK, 96%)
The Entrance Tigers	20 – 20	Cessnock Goannas	Sunday, 14 July	EDSAAC South	Brayden Musgrove (13 TB, 2 LBA, 1 LB, 1 TA, 5 OL, 181m, 14 CAR)
Western Suburbs Rosellas		BYE

==== Round 14 ====
Home	Score	Away	Match Information
Home	Score	Away	Date	Venue	LeagueCastle's Man of the Match (and Stats)
Cessnock Goannas	68 – 10	Kurri Kurri Bulldogs	Saturday, 20 July	Baddeley Park	Lewis Young (3 Tries, 6 LB, 12 TB, 1 TA, 1 TC, 1 LBA, 296m, 10 CAR)
Wyong Roos	10 – 16	Maitland Pickers	Saturday, 20 July	Morry Breen Oval	Jayden Butterfield (21 CAR, 193m, 38 TCK, 100% D)
Lakes United	82 – 6	Macquarie Scorpions	Sunday, 21 July	Cahill Oval	Dylan Phythian (1 Try, 3 TA, 5 LBA, 1 TC, 1 LB, 100% D)
Central Newcastle Butcher Boys	38 – 14	Western Suburbs Rosellas	Sunday, 21 July	St. John Oval	Isaiah Olsen (2 Tries, 2 LB, 7 TB)
Northern Hawks	South Newcastle Lions	The Entrance Tigers		BYE

==== Round 15 ====
Home	Score	Away	Match Information
Home	Score	Away	Date	Venue	LeagueCastle's Man of the Match (and Stats)
Kurri Kurri Bulldogs	8 – 56	South Newcastle Lions	Saturday, 27 July	Kurri Kurri Sportsground	Ryan Glanville (1 Try, 3 TA, 3 LBA, 1 LBC, 1 FDO, 2 LB, 5 TB, 100% D)
Maitland Pickers	50 – 0	Macquarie Scorpions	Saturday, 27 July	Maitland No. 1 Sportsground	Matt Soper-Lawler (3 Tries, 1 TA, 3 LBA, 2 LB, 8 TB, 230m, 12 CAR)
Northern Hawks	28 – 18	Lakes United	Saturday, 27 July	Tomaree Sports Ground	Floyd Tighe (1 Try, 1 LB, 1 FDO, 10.9m a run, 26 TCK, 93% D)
Western Suburbs Rosellas	20 – 12	Cessnock Goannas	Sunday, 28 July	Harker Oval	Nathan Ross (1 Try, 2 LB, 10 TB, 171m, 17 CAR)
Central Newcastle Butcher Boys	26 – 36	The Entrance Tigers	Sunday, 28 July	St. John Oval	Tony Pellow (1 Try, 2 TA, 1 TC, 3 LBA, 1 LB, 6 TB, 1 OL, 186m, 19 CAR)
Wyong Roos		BYE

==== Round 16 ====
Home	Score	Away	Match Information
Home	Score	Away	Date	Venue	LeagueCastle's Man of the Match (and Stats)
Lakes United	32 – 8	Cessnock Goannas	Saturday, 3 August	Cahill Oval	Aaron McGrady (1 Try, 2 LB, 8 TB, 1 TA, 1 TC, 119m, 2 forced errors)
Kurri Kurri Bulldogs	16 – 40	Central Newcastle Butcher Boys	Saturday, 3 August	Kurri Kurri Sportsground	Cameron Anderson (2 Tries, 4 LB, 9 TB, 3 OL, 1 TA, 1 TC, 1 LBA, 1 LBC, 210m, 14 CAR)
Northern Hawks	20 – 20	The Entrance Tigers	Saturday, 3 August	Tomaree Sports Ground	Manu Alexander (1 Try, 2 LB, 10 TB, 1 LBA, 1 TA, 152m)
Wyong Roos	36 – 32	Western Suburbs Rosellas	Saturday, 3 August	Morry Breen Oval	Ben Stone (2 Tries, 2 LB, 5 TB, 1 LBC, 53 TCK, 96% D)
South Newcastle Lions	20 – 42	Maitland Pickers	Saturday, 10 August	Townson Oval	Jayden Butterfield (1 Try, 2 LB, 6 TB, 2 TA, 2 LBA, 180m, 26 TCK, 96% D)
Macquarie Scorpions		BYE

==== Round 17 ====
Home	Score	Away	Match Information
Home	Score	Away	Date	Venue	LeagueCastle's Man of the Match (and Stats)
Cessnock Goannas	40 – 14	The Entrance Tigers	Saturday, 17 August	Baddeley Park	Sam Apthorpe (2 Tries, 2 LB, 3 TB, 98m, 23 TCK, 92% D)
Western Suburbs Rosellas	26 – 30	South Newcastle Lions	Saturday, 17 August	Harker Oval	Ryan Glanville (1 Try, 1 LB, 6 TB, 1 TA, 1 TC, 2 LBA, 2 LBC, 3 OL, 94m, 92% D)
Macquarie Scorpions	26 – 58	Wyong Roos	Saturday, 17 August	Lyall Peacock Field	Mitch Williams (2 Tries, 1 LB, 2 TB, 6 TA, 1 TC, 7 LBA, 2 LBC, 93% D)
Northern Hawks	44 – 12	Kurri Kurri Bulldogs	Saturday, 17 August	Tomaree Sportsground	Callan Briggs (1 Try, 4 LB, 5 TB, 2 TA, 1 LBA, 2 OL, 168m)
Central Newcastle Butcher Boys	21 – 0	Lakes United	Tuesday, 27 August	St. John Oval	Match Abandoned due to serious injury in 2nd half. Central awarded points (Lakes Forfeit). LeagueCastle awarded player of game to Logan Radzievic (1 TA, 1 TC, 1 FDO, 1 LBA, 1 LBC, 3 TB, 90% D).
Maitland Pickers		BYE

==== Round 18 ====
Home	Score	Away	Match Information
Home	Score	Away	Date	Venue	LeagueCastle's Man of the Match (and Stats)
South Newcastle Lions	34 – 6	Northern Hawks	Saturday, 24 August	Townson Oval	Jack Welsh (2 LB, 6 TB, 1 LBA, 1 TC, 1 OL, 153m, 14 CAR, 25 TCK, 96% D)
Lakes United	16 – 56	Maitland Pickers	Saturday, 24 August	Cahill Oval	Reid Alchin (2 Tries, 4 LB, 4 TB, 2 OL, 2 TA, 1 TC, 1 LBA, 106m)
Kurri Kurri Bulldogs	16 – 64	Western Suburbs Rosellas	Saturday, 24 August	Kurri Kurri Sportsground	Aidan Storrie (1 Try, 3 TA, 2 TC, 6 LBA, 1 LBC, 2 OL, 124m)
Wyong Roos	34 – 22	Central Newcastle Butcher Boys	Saturday, 24 August	Morry Breen Oval	Lathan Hutchinson-Walters (2 Tries, 2 LB, 7 TB, 156m, 14 CAR)
The Entrance Tigers	70 – 0	Macquarie Scorpions	Sunday, 25 August	EDSAAC South	Nick Newman (3 Tries, 1 LB, 4 TB, 2 TA, 1 TC, 3 LBA, 1 LBC, 106m, 100% D).
Cessnock Goannas		BYE

=== Finals Series ===
Home	Score	Away	Match Information
Home	Score	Away	Date	Venue
Qualifying & Elimination Finals
South Newcastle Lions	10 – 26	Central Newcastle Butcher Boys	Saturday, 7th September	Townson Oval
The Entrance Tigers	16 – 6	Cessnock Goannas	Sunday, 8 September	EDSAAC South
Minor & Major Semi-Finals
Maitland Pickers	40 – 12	Central Newcastle Butcher Boys	Saturday, 14 September	Maitland Sportsground
South Newcastle Lions	10 – 28	The Entrance Tigers	Sunday, 15 September	Baddeley Park
Preliminary Final
Central Newcastle Butcher Boys	30 – 20	The Entrance Tigers	Sunday, 22 September	St. John Oval
Grand Final
Maitland Pickers	24 – 4	Central Newcastle Butcher Boys	Sunday, 29 September	McDonald Jones Stadium
