= Newcastle Rugby League =

Football competition in Newcastle, Australia

- Sport: Rugby league
- Instituted: 1910
- Inaugural season: 1910
- Number of teams: 11
- Country: Australia
- Premiers: South Newcastle (2026)
- Most titles: West Newcastle (23 titles)
- Website: Newcastle RL on facebook
- Broadcast partner: Bar TV Sports (Australia)
- Related competition: Presidents Cup Conferences: *Peter McDonald Premiership (West); *Ron Massey Cup (Central); *Mojo Homes Illawarra Cup (South)

The Newcastle Rugby League is a local rugby league football competition in Newcastle, New South Wales. It is one of the oldest rugby league competitions in Australia, founded in 1910. A Newcastle representative team was also assembled from players in the League during most of the 20th century. The first grade competition also comprises the NSWRL Presidents Cup Northern Conference.

== History ==
The original franchise from Newcastle competed in the inaugural Sydney Rugby League premiership of 1908 but withdrew after the 1909 season to form the local competition under the banner of the Northern Branch of the NSWRL.

The four original teams were Central Newcastle (Blue & White), North Newcastle (Light & Dark Blue vertical stripes), South Newcastle (Red & White) and West Newcastle (Red & Green). The season kicked off 14 May 1910 with South playing West and Central playing Northern Suburbs. South Newcastle finished the season on top of the ladder; the final was played in front of 2500 spectators at Hamilton League Ground, with Central overcoming South 13–4.

The 1911 season saw the previous minor premiers South slump to the bottom of the ladder. The final was played in front of 4000 spectators and saw North victorious over Central 10–2. 1911 saw the Combined Newcastle & Hunter team Tour Queensland, defeating the Queensland State team in all matches played. Newcastle played against the touring New Zealand team in a tight match almost pulling off an upset before going down 21–20.

The 1912 season saw the addition of East Newcastle, playing in Black and White. They were immediately competitive and made the grand final.

The First World War saw a halt to the competition for 1917 and 1918. Although the Newcastle Morning Herald did continue to publish results for competition games for those two years. The NSW Football League sacked most of the local officials following an early game of the 1917 season in which the Western Suburbs Club played a disqualified player. The competition was thrown into turmoil and the season was abandoned. The 1918 season was also abandoned because the officials were still serving their suspensions and the player shortage had worsened.

1919 saw a split, with two smaller competitions held – the "Lilywhites" or clubs faithful to the NSWRL, composed of Eastern Suburbs and Northern Suburbs, and the "Bolsheviks" or rebels composed of South, Central, North and West.

1920 saw the competition reunited when the Newcastle Rugby League (NRL) was officially formed and expanded to six teams as Kurri Kurri competed for the first time. The Newcastle Sports Ground (No1) was officially opened 16 September 1922 on land donated by the Australian Agricultural Company. The opening was marked between Western Suburbs (Sydney) and a Newcastle representative side, with Newcastle winning 20–16. The first game under lights was played at the Newcastle Coursing and Sporting Club (later the Newcastle Greyhound track) at Hamilton South in 1928.

The 1930s saw the emergence of the Coalfields teams (such as Cessnock Goannas in 1930). Football games were first broadcast on the radio in this decade, but only after considerable debate by Newcastle Rugby League. The record score was established in this decade on 27 July 1939, when Northern Suburbs defeated Morpeth-East Maitland 127–16. North winger Alf Fairhall scored 11 tries and kicked 14 goals, with the game called off 20 minutes early.

The Country Rugby League (CRL) formed in 1934 and became the governing body for the sport of rugby league in areas of New South Wales outside the Sydney metropolitan area, such as Newcastle.

In the mid-1950s, the major football clubs were opening large licensed Social Clubs. Bar and poker machine revenue from these clubs provided a new source of cash to fund and develop the game. Also in this era, the 'six-yard rule' was introduced to keep both the attacking and defending teams from being within three yards of the play the ball.

Prior to 1960, if the minor premiers were defeated in the playoffs, they then had the right to challenge the winner of the final to a grand final match. The Second Division competition started in 1960 with nine teams, growing to 23 for the 1961 season. Macquarie also entered the league in 1960. In 1962, the local Television station (NBN 3) began transmitting to Newcastle audiences.

From 1963 to 1965, the Newcastle representative team won 15 consecutive matches, including wins in three Country Championships and wins against South Africa and France, and the famous victories in the State Cup. This Cup, in which Sydney teams played NSW Country Divisional teams in a knockout competition, was launched in 1964 by the NSWRL. Newcastle defeated South Sydney, North Sydney, the all-conquering St George and Parramatta to win the Cup. This side featured names such as Terry Pannowitz, Allan Buman, and Dave Brown (captain).

In 1968, the Central Newcastle club relocated from the inner-city to Charlestown and became Central-Charlestown, popularly known as 'The Butcher Boys'.

During the 1970s, the ten District clubs engaged in a line-up of high-profile Captains/Coaches. Great Britain international Terry Clawson (South Newcastle), immortal and Australian international Johnny Raper (Western Suburbs), Australian international Brian 'Chicka' Moore (Macquarie) and Australian international Alan Thomson (Lakes United), to name a few. In 1971, the 'six tackle rule' was introduced. In 1978, foundation club Northern Suburbs became North Newcastle after it enlarged its district to include Raymond Terrace and Nelson Bay.

In 1988, the league changed majorly with the introduction of the Newcastle Knights into the NSWRL competition, the first representation of the Newcastle and Hunter region since the Newcastle Rebels departed after the 1909 season.

As a result, the 1990s saw the Newcastle Knights attract the lion's share of the spectators in Newcastle and support for local clubs suffered. This downturn was offset to a certain extent when former Knights players began to filter into the local competition. The drift of players boosted the profile of the local league, which was no more evident than when Steve Linnane led Kurri to a trifecta of premierships in 1993, 1994 and 1995.

The 2000s saw the league implement a 'salary cap' and a 'points system' for players signing with a 'new' club. This innovation was designed to control spending and to keep clubs alive and well. A joint venture launched in 2009 by the Knights and the Newcastle Rugby League was labelled 'the Player Placement Program', designed to allow Knights players not required by their club on a weekend, to play in the local competition.

2020 saw the competition cancelled for the first time in over one hundred years due to the COVID-19 pandemic. With restrictions easing, a decision was made to implement a two tiered amateur competition. First Grade would feature Lakes United, Western Suburbs, Cessnock, Maitland, Central and Souths. Reserve Grade would see representation from Western Suburbs, Lakes United, Cessnock, Maitland, Central, Souths and Kurri Kurri. Of further note, Maitland also elected to participate in the Presidents Cup, spreading their resources across the two Newcastle competitions as well as the New South Wales based Presidents Cup, which they won. Cessnock defeated South Newcastle in the First Grade Grand Final.

The 2021 season featured the regular clubs, as well as both Wyong and The Entrance, forming a 10 team, 18 round competition. The Entrance will contest the competition for the first time in their history. As well as this, the Major Premiers also now advance to meet title winners from Illawarra, Ron Massey Cup and a wildcard in a conference style President's Cup at the end of the year. Unfortunately, the competition was interrupted by COVID-19 restrictions placed on the Hunter region, with a decision made to cancel the competition prior to any finals being played. Maitland Pickers had secured the Minor Premiership, but there would be no Major Premiers for season 2021. No President's Cup tournament was contested.

Season 2022 saw the Maitland Pickers claim the minor premiership with 31 competition points, with Central Newcastle (29), Macquarie Scorpions (22), Cessnock Goannas (22) and South Newcastle (22) rounding out the top five. On 11 September 2022, Maitland Pickers claimed their 13th premiership with a 40–4 victory over Macquarie Scorpions at McDonald Jones Stadium in Newcastle. On 25 September 2022, Maitland defended their Presidents Cup crown with a 36–12 win over The Hills Bulls. 2022 NSWRL Presidents Cup.

Season 2023 included The Northern Hawks, bumping the number of teams in the league to 11. All teams will compete in the overarching 2023 NSWRL Presidents Cup. 2023 saw the modern-day version of the Newcastle Rebels, a team constructed of the best talent from the Newcastle Rugby League, return to the Men's Country Championships. Maitland Pickers won the Premiership to secure back to back titles, defeating South Newcastle Lions 46–10.

2024 Newcastle Rugby League Season saw Maitland Pickers defeat Central Newcastle in the First Grade Grand Final, 24–4. Central Newcastle appeared in their first Grand Final since 1963, breaking a 49-year drought. The inaugural Women's Premiership was also contested in 2024, with Maitland Pickers Women's team claiming the title.

== First Grade Clubs ==
=== Current ===
Club	Colours	City/Suburb	Home venue	Est.	FG Seasons	FG Premierships	
Club	Colours	City/Suburb	Home venue	Est.	FG Seasons	Total	Recent
Central Newcastle Butcher Boys		Newcastle (Charlestown)	St John Oval	1910	1910–16, 1920–present	7	1949
Cessnock Goannas		Cessnock	Cessnock Sportsground	1911	1930–present	9	2020
Kurri Kurri Bulldogs		Kurri Kurri	Kurri Kurri Sports Ground	1911	1919–20, 1927–present	6	1995
Lakes United Seagulls		Lake Macquarie (Belmont)	Cahill Oval	1945	1947–present	11	2015
Macquarie Scorpions		Lake Macquarie (Toronto)	Lyall Peacock Field	1960	1960–present	2	2017
Maitland Pickers		Maitland	Maitland Sportsground	1927	1927–1989, 1991–03, 2005–06, 2009–present	14	2025
Northern Hawks		Port Stephens	Tomaree Sporting Complex	2021	2023–present	0	—
South Newcastle Lions		Newcastle (Merewether)	Townson Oval	1910	1910–16, 1919–present	12	2026
The Entrance Tigers		The Entrance	EDSACC Oval	1934	2021–present	0	—
Western Suburbs Rosellas		Newcastle (New Lambton)	Harker Oval	1910	1910–16, 1919–present	23	2019

=== Former ===
Club	Est.	Colours	City/Suburb	Reason	FG Seasons	FG Premierships	
Club	Est.	Colours	City/Suburb	Reason	FG Seasons	Total	Final
Central-South Newcastle	1919		Newcastle (Charlestown)	Demerged; Central & South reformed as separate teams	1919	1	1919
Eastern Suburbs	1912		Newcastle (Newcastle West)	Folded due to player shortage during WWII	1912–16, 1919–42	5	1932
Maitland United Pumpkin Pickers	1925		Maitland	Folded due to district being given to Morpeth-East Maitland	1925, 1927–42	2	1934
Morpeth	1925		Maitland (South Maitland)	Merged with East Maitland to form Morpeth-East Maitland	1925	0	—
North-Nelson Bay Marlins	1988		Port Stephens	Demerged; North Newcastle joined second division	1989–00	0	—
Northern Blues	1911		Port Stephens	Folded; Succeeded by Port Stephens	2001–11	1	2005
North Newcastle Bluebags	1910		Newcastle (Wickham)	Merged with Nelson Bay to form North-Nelson Bay	1910–16, 1919–88	15	1979
Port Stephens Sharks			Port Stephens	Folded; Succeeded by Nelson Bay	2012–14	0	—
Raymond Terrace Magpies			Raymond Terrace	Moved to Group 21 Premiership	2001–08	0	—
Wyong Roos	1910		Wyong Roos	Moved back to Central Coast Competition in 2026	2003–12, 2020–2025	1	2009
Waratah-Mayfield Cheetahs	1927		Newcastle (Waratah)	Recess; Moved to second division	1927–01, 2003	6	2000

== Current Competitions ==
=== First Grade ===
Year	Premiers	Score	Runners-up	Match Information
Year	Premiers	Score	Runners-up	Date	Venue	Referee	Video
NSWRL Northern Branch Premiership (1910–16, 1919)
1910	Central Newcastle	13 – 4	South Newcastle	10 September 1910	Hamilton League Ground, Newcastle	T. McMahon Sr.
1911	Northern Suburbs	10 – 2	Central Newcastle	9 September 1911	Hamilton League Ground, Newcastle	L. Kearney
1912	Western Suburbs	10 – 7	East Newcastle	21 September 1912	Newcastle Sportsground, Newcastle	H. Poulton
1913	East Newcastle	18 – 0	Western Suburbs	13 September 1913	Newcastle Sportsground, Newcastle	T. McMahon Sr.
1914	(2) Northern Suburbs	5 – 2	Central Newcastle	29 August 1914	Newcastle Sportsground, Newcastle	W. Reid
1915	(2) Western Suburbs	22 – 8	Northern Suburbs	11 September 1915	Newcastle Sportsground, Newcastle	T. McMahon Sr.
1916	(3) Western Suburbs	10 – 8	Northern Suburbs	19 August 1916	Newcastle Sportsground, Newcastle	L. Colgan
1917	No Official Competition Contested
1918	No Official Competition Contested
1919	(2) Eastern Suburbs	11 – 9	Northern Suburbs	23 August 1919	Wickham Park, Newcastle	L. Colgan
NDRLFA Premiership (1919)
1919	Central-South Newcastle	7 – 2	Western Suburbs	16 August 1919
Newcastle Rugby League Premiership (1920–present)
1920	(3) Northern Suburbs	11 – 0	South Newcastle	14 August 1920	Newcastle Showground, Newcastle	J. Mitten
1921	(2) Central Newcastle	5 – 3	Western Suburbs	3 September 1921	Newcastle Showground, Newcastle	J. Mitten
1922	(4) Western Suburbs	5 – 0	Central Newcastle	29 July 1922	Newcastle Showground, Newcastle	L. Colgan
1923	(3) Eastern Suburbs	17 – 8	Northern Suburbs	22 September 1923	Newcastle No.1 Sportsground, Newcastle	L. Colgan
1924	(4) Eastern Suburbs	9 – 2	Northern Suburbs	12 July 1924	Newcastle No.1 Sportsground, Newcastle	L. Colgan
1925	(4) Northern Suburbs	10 – 6	Eastern Suburbs	12 September 1925	Newcastle No.1 Sportsground, Newcastle	J. Mitten
1926	(5) Northern Suburbs	13 – 8	South Newcastle	3 July 1926	Newcastle No.1 Sportsground, Newcastle	L. Colgan
1927	South Newcastle	8 – 3	Northern Suburbs	24 September 1927	Newcastle No.1 Sportsground, Newcastle	L. Colgan
1928	(3) Central Newcastle	11 – 8	Northern Suburbs	22 September 1928	Newcastle No.1 Sportsground, Newcastle	E. Hill
1929	(6) Northern Suburbs	10 – 5	Waratah-Mayfield	5 October 1929	Waratah Oval, Newcastle	J. Mitten
1930	(4) Central Newcastle	17 – 2	South Newcastle	27 September 1930	Newcastle No.1 Sportsground, Newcastle	J. Mitten
1931	Kurri Kurri	7 – 7	Northern Suburbs Bluebags	26 September 1931	Newcastle No.1 Sportsground, Newcastle	J. Moses
1931	Kurri Kurri	9 – 0	Northern Suburbs Bluebags	3 October 1931	Newcastle No.1 Sportsground, Newcastle	J. Moses
1932	(5) Eastern Suburbs	20 – 17	Cessnock	17 September 1932	Newcastle Showground, Newcastle	E. Hill
1933	Maitland United Pumpkin Pickers	20 – 0	Waratah-Mayfield	30 September 1933	Newcastle No.1 Sportsground, Newcastle
1934	(2) Maitland United Pumpkin Pickers	4 – 2	Waratah-Mayfield	8 September 1934	Newcastle No.1 Sportsground, Newcastle
1935	(7) Northern Suburbs Bluebags	14 – 4	Central Newcastle	5 October 1935	Newcastle No.1 Sportsground, Newcastle	J. Mercer
1936	Waratah-Mayfield	12 – 2	Cessnock	19 September 1936	Newcastle No.1 Sportsground, Newcastle	R. Lewis
1937	(5) Central Newcastle	22 – 7	Cessnock	11 September 1937	Newcastle No.1 Sportsground, Newcastle
1938	(8) Northern Suburbs Bluebags	20 – 4	Waratah-Mayfield	1 October 1938	Newcastle No.1 Sportsground, Newcastle	R. Lewis
1939	(6) Central Newcastle	34 – 5	Western Suburbs Rosellas	2 September 1939	Newcastle No.1 Sportsground, Newcastle	A. Shipway
1940	(2) Kurri Kurri	12 – 5	Cessnock	21 September 1940	Newcastle No.1 Sportsground, Newcastle	R. Cody
1941	Cessnock	18 – 3	South Newcastle	6 September 1941	Newcastle No.1 Sportsground, Newcastle	R. Cody
1942	(2) Waratah-Mayfield	18 – 11	South Newcastle	3 October 1942	Newcastle No.1 Sportsground, Newcastle
1943	(2) South Newcastle	9 – 0	Waratah-Mayfield	28 August 1943	Newcastle No.1 Sportsground, Newcastle	R. Lewis
1944	(3) Waratah-Mayfield	18 – 15	Western Suburbs Rosellas	2 September 1944	New Lambton Oval, Newcastle
1945	(3) Kurri Kurri	7 – 4	South Newcastle	8 September 1945	Newcastle No.1 Sportsground, Newcastle
1946	(3) South Newcastle	11 – 3	Western Suburbs Rosellas	17 August 1946	Newcastle No.1 Sportsground, Newcastle
1947	Lakes United	13 – 0	Northern Suburbs Bluebags	20 September 1947	New Lambton Oval, Newcastle	R. Baker
1948	(9) Northern Suburbs Bluebags	5 – 2	Kurri Kurri	18 September 1948	Newcastle No.1 Sportsground, Newcastle	E. Howley
1949	(7) Central Newcastle	28 – 15	Kurri Kurri
1950	(2) Cessnock	19 – 12	Central Newcastle	7 October 1950	Maitland Showground, Maitland
1951	(10) Northern Suburbs Bluebags	12 – 8	Maitland District Pumpkin Pickers	8 September 1951	Newcastle No.1 Sportsground, Newcastle	H. Gillard
1952	(4) Waratah-Mayfield	5 – 4	Lakes United Seagulls
1953	(11) Northern Suburbs Bluebags	16 – 11	Cessnock	12 September 1953	Newcastle No.1 Sportsground, Newcastle	J. Lane
1954	(3) Cessnock	14 – 13	Maitland District Pumpkin Pickers
1955	(4) Cessnock	9 – 7	Maitland Pumpkin Pickers
1956	Maitland Pumpkin Pickers	16 – 9	Cessnock
1957	(2) Maitland Pumpkin Pickers	17 – 12	Kurri Kurri			N. Spohr
1958	(3) Maitland Pumpkin Pickers	22 – 7	Cessnock			N. Spohr
1959	(12) Northern Suburbs Bluebags	13 – 12	Maitland Pumpkin Pickers			N. Spohr
1960	(5) Cessnock	33 – 5	Maitland Pumpkin Pickers			N. Spohr
1961	(5) Western Suburbs Rosellas	10 – 9	Waratah-Mayfield			N. Spohr
1962	(13) Northern Suburbs Bluebags	18 – 6	South Newcastle Lions			N. Spohr
1963	(4) South Newcastle Lions	12 – 7	Central Newcastle			N. Spohr
1964	(5) South Newcastle Lions	27 – 12	Western Suburbs Rosellas			N. Spohr
1965	(4) Maitland Pumpkin Pickers	22 – 3	South Newcastle Lions			N. Spohr
1966	(6) Western Suburbs Rosellas	31 – 9	Cessnock			N. Spohr
1967	(14) Northern Suburbs Bluebags	13 – 11	Western Suburbs Rosellas	26 August 1967	Newcastle No.1 Sportsground, Newcastle	N. Spohr
1968	(6) South Newcastle Lions	9 – 6	Lakes United Seagulls			N. Spohr
1969	(5) Maitland Pumpkin Pickers	19 – 9	Lakes United Seagulls
1970	(7) Western Suburbs Rosellas	21 – 14	Maitland Pumpkin Pickers			T. Gustard
1971	(6) Maitland Pumpkin Pickers	30 – 19	Lakes United Seagulls
1972	(6) Cessnock	18 – 10	Maitland Pumpkin Pickers
1973	(7) Maitland Pumpkin Pickers	27 – 18	Western Suburbs Rosellas
1974	(2) Lakes United Seagulls	7 – 2	Western Suburbs Rosellas	15 September 1974	Newcastle No.1 Sportsground, Newcastle
1975	(3) Lakes United Seagulls	30 – 17	Western Suburbs Rosellas	14 September 1975	Newcastle No.1 Sportsground, Newcastle
1976	(7) South Newcastle Lions	22 – 15	Western Suburbs Rosellas	12 September 1976	Newcastle No.1 Sportsground, Newcastle
1977	(7) Cessnock Goannas	21 – 17	Maitland Pumpkin Pickers	11 September 1977	Newcastle No.1 Sportsground, Newcastle	J. Geddes
1978	(8) Western Suburbs Rosellas	23 – 16	South Newcastle Lions	17 September 1978	Newcastle No.1 Sportsground, Newcastle	J. Geddes
1979	(15) North Newcastle Bluebags	20 – 8	Cessnock Goannas	16 September 1979	Newcastle No.1 Sportsground, Newcastle	T. Gustard
1980	(9) Western Suburbs Rosellas	17 – 3	Cessnock Goannas	14 September 1980	Newcastle No.1 Sportsground, Newcastle	G. Alchin
1981	(10) Western Suburbs Rosellas	13 – 2	Cessnock Goannas	20 September 1981	Newcastle No.1 Sportsground, Newcastle	T. Gustard
1982	(11) Western Suburbs Rosellas	21 – 14	Kurri Kurri Bulldogs
1983	(8) Maitland Pumpkin Pickers	20 – 12	Cessnock Goannas	11 September 1983	Newcastle International Sports Centre, Newcastle	T. Gustard
1984	(12) Western Suburbs Rosellas	10 – 2	Lakes United Seagulls	9 September 1984	Newcastle International Sports Centre, Newcastle	T. Gustard
1985	(4) Lakes United Seagulls	12 – 6	Cessnock Goannas	8 September 1985	Newcastle International Sports Centre, Newcastle	T. Gustard
1986	(5) Lakes United Seagulls	4 – 0	South Newcastle Lions	14 September 1986	Newcastle International Sports Centre, Newcastle	T. Gustard
1987	(6) Lakes United Seagulls	24 – 16	South Newcastle Lions	30 August 1987	Newcastle No.1 Sportsground, Newcastle	T. Gustard
1988	(8) South Newcastle Lions	29 – 8	Lakes United Seagulls	21 August 1988	Newcastle International Sports Centre, Newcastle	M. Benson
1989	(9) South Newcastle Lions	20 – 2	Western Suburbs Rosellas	3 September 1989	Newcastle International Sports Centre, Newcastle	M. Benson
1990	(5) Waratah-Mayfield Cheetahs	17 – 14	Lakes United Seagulls	19 August 1990	Harker Oval, Newcastle	M. Benson
1991	Toronto Workers Scorpions	21 – 10	Western Suburbs Rosellas	1 September 1991	Harker Oval, Newcastle	P. Lovett	V
1992	(13) Western Suburbs Rosellas	33 – 0	Lakes United Seagulls	6 September 1992	Harker Oval, Newcastle	P. Lovett
1993	(4) Kurri Workers Bulldogs	20 – 18	Western Suburbs Rosellas	29 August 1993	Newcastle No.1 Sportsground, Newcastle	P. Lovett	V
1994	(5) Kurri Workers Bulldogs	20 – 16	Toronto Workers Scorpions	28 August 1994	Newcastle No.1 Sportsground, Newcastle	R. Williams	V
1995	(6) Kurri Workers Bulldogs	24 – 4	Western Suburbs Rosellas	20 August 1995	Newcastle No.1 Sportsground, Newcastle	R. Williams	V
1996	(7) Lakes United Seagulls	16 – 6	Western Suburbs Rosellas	1 September 1996	Newcastle No.1 Sportsground, Newcastle	T. Hardy
1997	(14) Western Suburbs Rosellas	26 – 16	Lakes United Seagulls	7 September 1997	Newcastle No.1 Sportsground, Newcastle	R. Williams
1998	(15) Western Suburbs Rosellas	51 – 14	South Newcastle Lions	23 August 1998	Newcastle No.1 Sportsground, Newcastle	D. Andrews
1999	(16) Western Suburbs Rosellas	22 – 18	Cessnock Goannas	22 August 1999	Newcastle No.1 Sportsground, Newcastle	T. Hardy
2000	(6) Waratah-Mayfield Cheetahs	20 – 14	Lakes United Seagulls	10 September 2000	Newcastle No.1 Sportsground, Newcastle	D. Andrews	V1 V2
2001	(8) Lakes United Seagulls	18 – 10	Western Suburbs Rosellas	26 August 2001	Newcastle No.1 Sportsground, Newcastle	T. Hardy	V
2002	(17) Western Suburbs Rosellas	27 – 16	Lakes United Seagulls	8 September 2002	Newcastle No.1 Sportsground, Newcastle	J. Taylor
2003	(8) Cessnock Goannas	22 – 20	Raymond Terrace Magpies	31 August 2003	Newcastle No.1 Sportsground, Newcastle	D. Andrews
2004	(18) Western Suburbs Rosellas	32 – 28	Northern Blues	5 September 2004	Newcastle No.1 Sportsground, Newcastle	J. Taylor
2005	Northern Blues	30 – 12	Western Suburbs Rosellas	11 September 2005	Newcastle No.1 Sportsground, Newcastle	D. Sproule
2006	(9) Lakes United Seagulls	40 – 22	Nelson Bay Blues	3 September 2006	Newcastle No.1 Sportsground, Newcastle	D. Sproule
2007	(10) Lakes United Seagulls	32 – 12	Wyong Roos	2 September 2007	Newcastle No.1 Sportsground, Newcastle	D. Sproule	V
2008	(19) Western Suburbs Rosellas	12 – 10	Cessnock Goannas	31 August 2008	Newcastle No.1 Sportsground, Newcastle	D. Smith
2009	Wyong Roos	36 – 4	Cessnock Goannas	13 September 2009	Newcastle No.1 Sportsground, Newcastle	D. Oultram
2010	(9) Maitland Pickers	24 – 8	Cessnock Goannas	19 September 2010	Newcastle No.1 Sportsground, Newcastle	D. Smith
2011	(10) Maitland Pickers	19 – 18	Western Suburbs Rosellas	18 September 2011	Newcastle No.1 Sportsground, Newcastle	D. Oultram	V
2012	(20) Western Suburbs Rosellas	16 – 14	Cessnock Goannas	23 September 2012	Newcastle No.1 Sportsground, Newcastle	D. Oultram	V
2013	(21) Western Suburbs Rosellas	21 – 8	Kurri Kurri Bulldogs	22 September 2013	Newcastle No.1 Sportsground, Newcastle	J. Taylor	V
2014	(22) Western Suburbs Rosellas	22 – 8	Cessnock Goannas	21 September 2014	Newcastle No.1 Sportsground, Newcastle	J. Taylor	V
2015	(11) Lakes United Seagulls	24 – 18	Macquarie Scorpions	27 September 2015	Hunter Stadium, Newcastle	J. Taylor	V
2016	(10) South Newcastle Lions	21 – 12	Macquarie Scorpions	18 September 2016	Hunter Stadium, Newcastle	T. Aylett	V
2017	(2) Macquarie Scorpions	24 – 6	Western Suburbs Rosellas	23 September 2017	McDonald Jones Stadium, Newcastle	T. Aylett	V
2018	(11) South Newcastle Lions	30 – 18	Lakes United Seagulls	23 September 2018	McDonald Jones Stadium, Newcastle	L. Matheson	V
2019	(23) Western Suburbs Rosellas	36 – 20	Cessnock Goannas	22 September 2019	McDonald Jones Stadium, Newcastle	J. Butler	V
2020	(9) Cessnock Goannas	20 – 6	South Newcastle Lions	18 October 2020	Maitland Sportsground, Maitland	T. Taylor	V
2021	Competition cancelled due to Covid-19
2022	(11) Maitland Pickers	40 – 4	Macquarie Scorpions	11 September 2022	McDonald Jones Stadium, Newcastle	J. Butler	V
2023	(12) Maitland Pickers	46 – 10	South Newcastle Lions	3 September 2023	McDonald Jones Stadium, Newcastle	J. Butler	V
2024	(13) Maitland Pickers	24 – 4	Central Newcastle Butcher Boys	29 September 2024	McDonald Jones Stadium, Newcastle	J. Butler	V
2025	(14) Maitland Pickers	30 – 8	Cessnock Goannas	21 September 2025	McDonald Jones Stadium, Newcastle	K. Grogan	V
2026	(12) South Newcastle Lions	18 - 16	Maitland Pickers	6 September 2026	McDonald Jones Stadium, Newcastle	K. Grogan

==== Team Performance ====
Team	Winners	Runners-up	Years won	Years runner-up
Western Suburbs Rosellas	23	21	1912, 1915, 1916, 1922, 1961, 1966, 1970, 1978, 1980, 1981, 1982, 1984, 1992, 1997, 1998, 1999, 2002, 2004, 2008, 2012, 2013, 2014, 2019	1913, 1919, 1921, 1939, 1944, 1946, 1964, 1967, 1973, 1974, 1975, 1976, 1989, 1991, 1993, 1995, 1996, 2001, 2005, 2011, 2017
North Newcastle Bluebags	15	9	1911, 1914, 1920, 1925, 1926, 1929, 1935, 1938, 1948, 1951 1953, 1959, 1962, 1967, 1979	1915, 1916, 1919, 1923, 1924, 1927, 1928, 1931, 1947
Maitland Pickers	14	9	1956, 1957, 1958, 1965, 1969, 1971, 1973, 1983, 2010, 2011, 2022, 2023, 2024, 2025	1951, 1954, 1955, 1959, 1960, 1970, 1972, 1977, 2026
South Newcastle Lions	12	15	1927, 1943, 1946, 1963, 1964, 1968, 1976, 1988, 1989, 2016, 2018, 2026	1910, 1920, 1926, 1930, 1941, 1942, 1944, 1962, 1965, 1978, 1986, 1987, 1998, 2020, 2023
Lakes United Seagulls	11	12	1947, 1974, 1975, 1985, 1986, 1987, 1996, 2001, 2006, 2007, 2015	1952, 1968, 1969, 1971, 1984, 1988, 1990, 1992, 1997, 2000, 2002, 2018
Cessnock Goannas	9	21	1941, 1950, 1954, 1955, 1960, 1972, 1977, 2003, 2020	1932, 1936, 1937, 1940, 1953, 1956, 1958, 1966, 1979, 1980, 1981, 1983, 1985, 1999, 2008, 2009, 2010, 2012, 2014, 2019, 2025
Central Newcastle Butcher Boys	7	7	1910, 1921, 1928, 1930, 1937, 1939, 1949	1911, 1914, 1922, 1935, 1950, 1963, 2024
Waratah-Mayfield Cheetahs	6	6	1936, 1942, 1944, 1952, 1990, 2000	1929, 1933, 1934, 1938, 1943, 1961
Kurri Kurri Bulldogs	6	5	1931, 1940, 1945, 1993, 1994, 1995	1948, 1949, 1957, 1982, 2013
East Newcastle	5	2	1913, 1919, 1923, 1924, 1932	1912, 1925
Macquarie Scorpions	2	4	1991, 2017	1994, 2015, 2016, 2022
Maitland United Pumpkin Pickers	2	0	1933, 1934	—
Northern Blues	1	2	2005	2004, 2006
Wyong Roos	1	1	2009	2007
Central-South Newcastle	1	0	1919	—
Raymond Terrace Magpies	0	1	—	2003

=== Reserve Grade ===
Year	Premiers	Score	Runners-up	Match Information
Year	Premiers	Score	Runners-up	Date	Venue	Referee	Video
NSWRL Northern Branch Second Grade (1910–16)
1910	Northern Suburbs (R)	7 – 2	Waratah	13 August 1910	Hamilton League Ground, Newcastle	W. Gower
1911	(2) Northern Suburbs (R)	15 – 3	Western Suburbs (R)	26 August 1911	Hamilton League Ground, Newcastle	R. Lawson
1912	(3) Northern Suburbs (R)	12 – 7	Western Suburbs (R)	24 August 1912	Newcastle Sportsground, Newcastle	H. Poulton
1913	Western Suburbs (R)	14 – 3	Central Newcastle (R)
1914	(2) Western Suburbs (R)	23 – 7	Northern Suburbs (R)	29 August 1914	Newcastle Sportsground, Newcastle	W. Reid
1915	(3) Western Suburbs (R)	13 – 3	Northern Suburbs (R)	29 August 1915	Hamilton League Ground, Newcastle
1916	No Official Competition Contested
1917	No Official Competition Contested
1918	No Official Competition Contested
1919	No Official Competition Contested
Newcastle Rugby League Reserve Grade (1920–present)
1920	South Newcastle (R)	5 – 0	Northern Suburbs (R)
1921	Broadmeadow	5 – 2	Carrington	27 August 1921	Newcastle Showground, Newcastle
1922	(4) Northern Suburbs (R)	2 – 0	Eastern Suburbs (R)	12 August 1922	Newcastle No.1 Sportsground, Newcastle	W. Reid
1923	(2) South Newcastle (R)	13 – 2	Toronto	8 September 1923	Newcastle No.1 Sportsground, Newcastle
1924	Carrington	5 – 3	South Newcastle (R)	23 August 1924	Newcastle No.1 Sportsground, Newcastle
1925	(2) Carrington	17 – 11	Western Suburbs (R)	18 July 1925	Newcastle No.1 Sportsground, Newcastle
1926	(5) Northern Suburbs (R)	8 – 2	Eastern Suburbs (R)	11 September 1926	Newcastle Showground, Newcastle	W. Ashton
1927	(3) South Newcastle (R)	13 – 5	Maitland United (R)	15 October 1927	Newcastle Showground, Newcastle	G. Patterson
1928	Eastern Suburbs (R)	6 – 0	Northern Suburbs (R)	22 September 1928	Newcastle No.1 Sportsground, Newcastle	J. Williams
1929	(2) Eastern Suburbs (R)	31 – 5	Kurri Kurri (R)	5 October 1929	Waratah Oval, Newcastle
1930	(6) Northern Suburbs (R)	10 – 7	South Newcastle (R)	4 October 1930	Newcastle No.1 Sportsground, Newcastle	J. Mercer
1931	(7) Northern Suburbs Bluebags (R)	24 – 4	Western Suburbs Rosellas (R)	19 September 1931	Newcastle No.1 Sportsground, Newcastle	H. Brown
1932	(3) Eastern Suburbs (R)	14 – 5	Maitland United Pumpkin Pickers (R)	3 September 1932	Newcastle No.1 Sportsground, Newcastle
1933	Maitland United Pumpkin Pickers (R)	5 – 4	Cessnock (R)	30 September 1933	Newcastle No.1 Sportsground, Newcastle	J. Mercer
1934	Cessnock (R)	14 – 11	Maitland United Pumpkin Pickers (R)	22 September 1934	Newcastle No.1 Sportsground, Newcastle
1935	(8) Northern Suburbs Bluebags (R)	13 – 7	Cessnock (R)	5 October 1935	Newcastle No.1 Sportsground, Newcastle	T. Taylor
1936	Kurri Kurri (R)	17 – 8	Waratah-Mayfield (R)	19 September 1936	Newcastle No.1 Sportsground, Newcastle	N. Thompson
1937	(9) Northern Suburbs Bluebags (R)	15 – 7	Kurri Kurri (R)	4 September 1937	Newcastle No.1 Sportsground, Newcastle	H. Brown
1938	(4) Eastern Suburbs (R)	7 – 3	Northern Suburbs Bluebags (R)	24 September 1938	Newcastle No.1 Sportsground, Newcastle	C. Ireland
1939	Waratah-Mayfield (R)	20 – 7	Central Newcastle (R)	9 September 1939	Newcastle No.1 Sportsground, Newcastle	H. Brown
1940	(4) Western Suburbs Rosellas (R)	10 – 3	Northern Suburbs Bluebags (R)	21 September 1940	Newcastle No.1 Sportsground, Newcastle	R. Lewis
1941	(4) South Newcastle (R)	8 – 7	Western Suburbs Rosellas (R)	20 September 1940	Newcastle No.1 Sportsground, Newcastle	R. Wheatley
1942	(2) Waratah-Mayfield (R)	6 – 3	South Newcastle (R)	10 October 1942	Newcastle No.1 Sportsground, Newcastle
1943	(5) South Newcastle (R)	8 – 7	Waratah-Mayfield (R)	4 September 1943	Newcastle No.1 Sportsground, Newcastle
1944	(6) South Newcastle (R)	5 – 0	Northern Suburbs Bluebags (R)	16 September 1944	New Lambton Oval, Newcastle	R. Baker
1945	(10) Northern Suburbs Bluebags (R)	11 – 2	Kurri Kurri Cooks (R)	15 September 1945	Newcastle No.1 Sportsground, Newcastle	L. Jensen
1946	Central Newcastle (R)	23 – 4	Belmont	17 August 1946	Newcastle No.1 Sportsground, Newcastle
1947	(2) Kurri Kurri Cooks (R)	26 – 12	South Newcastle (R)	20 September 1947	New Lambton Oval, Newcastle
1948	(3) Kurri Kurri Cooks (R)	29 – 2	South Newcastle (R)
1949	(2) Central Newcastle (R)	5 – 4	Cessnock (R)
1950	(11) Northern Suburbs Bluebags (R)	15 – 6	Cessnock (R)
1951	(2) Cessnock (R)	15 – 13	Northern Suburbs Bluebags (R)
1952	(3) Cessnock (R)	36 – 0	Waratah-Mayfield (R)
1953	(5) Western Suburbs Rosellas (R)	9 – 8	Cessnock (R)
1954	(4) Cessnock (R)	9 – 8	Northern Suburbs Bluebags (R)
1955	(3) Waratah-Mayfield (R)	12 – 7	Cessnock (R)
1956	Maitland Pumpkin Pickers (R)	14 – 6	Cessnock (R)
1957	(5) Cessnock (R)	28 – 6	South Newcastle (R)
1958	(6) Cessnock (R)	20 – 5	Waratah-Mayfield (R)
1959	(2) Maitland Pumpkin Pickers (R)	14 – 8	Lakes United Seagulls (R)
1960	(6) Western Suburbs Rosellas (R)	13 – 5	Maitland Pumpkin Pickers (R)
1961	(7) Western Suburbs Rosellas (R)	15 – 12	Maitland Pumpkin Pickers (R)
1962	(8) Western Suburbs Rosellas (R)	14 – 3	Maitland Pumpkin Pickers (R)
1963	(7) South Newcastle Lions (R)	10 – 6	Northern Suburbs Bluebags (R)	28 September 1963	Newcastle No.1 Sportsground, Newcastle	B. O'Brien
1964	(7) Cessnock (R)	15 – 4	Kurri Kurri Cooks (R)
1965	(9) Western Suburbs Rosellas (R)	22 – 11	Maitland Pumpkin Pickers (R)
1966	(10) Western Suburbs Rosellas (R)	19 – 9	Maitland Pumpkin Pickers (R)
1967	(11) Western Suburbs Rosellas (R)	21 – 9	Lakes United Seagulls (R)
1968	(12) Western Suburbs Rosellas (R)	15 – 9	Northern Suburbs Bluebags (R)	14 September 1968	Newcastle No.1 Sportsground, Newcastle	W. Humphries
1969	(13) Western Suburbs Rosellas (R)	14 – 8	South Newcastle Lions (R)
1970	(3) Maitland Pumpkin Pickers (R)	16 – 15	Western Suburbs Rosellas (R)
1971	(14) Western Suburbs Rosellas (R)	16 – 12	Maitland Pumpkin Pickers (R)
1972	(15) Western Suburbs Rosellas (R)	12 – 6	Maitland Pumpkin Pickers (R)
1973	(4) Kurri Kurri Cooks (R)	19 – 7	Maitland Pumpkin Pickers (R)
1974	Macquarie United Scorpions (R)	19 – 14	Western Suburbs Rosellas (R)	15 September 1974	Newcastle No.1 Sportsground, Newcastle
1975	(16) Western Suburbs Rosellas (R)	12 – 10	Lakes United Seagulls (R)	14 September 1975	Newcastle No.1 Sportsground, Newcastle
1976	Lakes United Seagulls (R)	20 – 12	Western Suburbs Rosellas (R)	12 September 1976	Newcastle No.1 Sportsground, Newcastle
1977	(8) Cessnock Goannas (R)	17 – 15	Western Suburbs Rosellas (R)	11 September 1977	Newcastle No.1 Sportsground, Newcastle	J. Geddes
1978	(9) Cessnock Goannas (R)	15 – 7	Maitland Pumpkin Pickers (R)	17 September 1978	Newcastle No.1 Sportsground, Newcastle	C. Russell
1979	(17) Western Suburbs Rosellas (R)	29 – 6	Maitland Pumpkin Pickers (R)	16 September 1979	Newcastle No.1 Sportsground, Newcastle	D. Thornton
1980	(10) Cessnock Goannas (R)	15 – 14	Western Suburbs Rosellas (R)	14 September 1980	Newcastle No.1 Sportsground, Newcastle	C. Russell
1981	(5) Kurri Kurri Bulldogs (R)	21 – 12	Cessnock Goannas (R)	20 September 1981	Newcastle No.1 Sportsground, Newcastle	C. Russell
1982	(18) Western Suburbs Rosellas (R)	21 – 10	Maitland Pumpkin Pickers (R)
1983	(2) Lakes United Seagulls (R)	19 – 8	Cessnock Goannas (R)	11 September 1983	Newcastle International Sports Centre, Newcastle	G. Turnbull
1984	(19) Western Suburbs Rosellas (R)	32 – 14	Waratah-Mayfield Cheetahs (R)	9 September 1984	Newcastle International Sports Centre, Newcastle	K. Marker
1985	(3) Lakes United Seagulls (R)	10 – 2	Western Suburbs Rosellas (R)	8 September 1985	Newcastle International Sports Centre, Newcastle	T. Garrett
1986	(20) Western Suburbs Rosellas (R)	8 – 6	South Newcastle Lions (R)	14 September 1986	Newcastle International Sports Centre, Newcastle	P. Lovett
1987	(4) Maitland Pumpkin Pickers (R)	19 – 18	Western Suburbs Rosellas (R)	30 August 1987	Newcastle No.1 Sportsground, Newcastle	K. Marker
1988	(21) Western Suburbs Rosellas (R)	20 – 0	Maitland Pumpkin Pickers (R)	21 August 1988	Newcastle International Sports Centre, Newcastle	P. Lovett
1989	(22) Western Suburbs Rosellas (R)	24 – 6	Maitland Pumpkin Pickers (R)	3 September 1989	Newcastle International Sports Centre, Newcastle	T. Hardy
1990	(4) Lakes United Seagulls (R)		South Newcastle Lions (R)	19 August 1990	Harker Oval, Newcastle	R. Haines
1991	(8) South Newcastle Lions (R)	32 – 24	Western Suburbs Rosellas (R)	1 September 1991	Harker Oval, Newcastle	R. Haines
1992	(23) Western Suburbs Rosellas (R)		Lakes United Seagulls (R)	6 September 1992	Harker Oval, Newcastle	R. Williams
1993	(4) Waratah-Mayfield Cheetahs (R)		South Newcastle Lions (R)	29 August 1993	Newcastle No.1 Sportsground, Newcastle	R. Williams
1994	(5) Maitland Pumpkin Pickers (R)		South Newcastle Lions (R)	28 August 1994	Newcastle No.1 Sportsground, Newcastle	T. Sutcliffe
1995	(5) Lakes United Seagulls (R)		Maitland Pumpkin Pickers (R)	20 August 1995	Newcastle No.1 Sportsground, Newcastle	T. Sutcliffe
1996	(24) Western Suburbs Rosellas (R)		Kurri Workers Bulldogs (R)	1 September 1996	Newcastle No.1 Sportsground, Newcastle	R. Williams
1997	(25) Western Suburbs Rosellas (R)		South Newcastle Lions (R)	7 September 1997	Newcastle No.1 Sportsground, Newcastle	T. Hardy
1998	(9) South Newcastle Lions (R)		Western Suburbs Rosellas (R)	23 August 1998	Newcastle No.1 Sportsground, Newcastle	D. Sproule
1999	(10) South Newcastle Lions (R)		Lakes United Seagulls (R)	22 August 1999	Newcastle No.1 Sportsground, Newcastle	G. Stair
2000	(26) Western Suburbs Rosellas (R)		Lakes United Seagulls (R)	10 September 2000	Newcastle No.1 Sportsground, Newcastle	J. Taylor
2001	(27) Western Suburbs Rosellas (R)		Cessnock Goannas (R)	26 August 2001	Newcastle No.1 Sportsground, Newcastle	D. Andrews
2002	(28) Western Suburbs Rosellas (R)		Cessnock Goannas (R)	8 September 2002	Newcastle No.1 Sportsground, Newcastle	D. Smith
2003	(29) Western Suburbs Rosellas (R)		Raymond Terrace Magpies	31 August 2003	Newcastle No.1 Sportsground, Newcastle	J. Taylor
2004	Wyong Roos (R)		Lakes United Seagulls (R)	5 September 2004	Newcastle No.1 Sportsground, Newcastle	G. West
2005	(30) Western Suburbs Rosellas (R)	38 – 24	Wyong Roos (R)	11 September 2005	Newcastle No.1 Sportsground, Newcastle	J. Taylor
2006	(2) Macquarie Scorpions (R)		Nelson Bay Blues (R)	3 September 2006	Newcastle No.1 Sportsground, Newcastle	J. Taylor
2007	(31) Western Suburbs Rosellas (R)	22 – 10	Cessnock Goannas (R)	2 September 2007	Newcastle No.1 Sportsground, Newcastle	J. Taylor	V
2008	(3) Macquarie Scorpions (R)	30 – 26	Western Suburbs Rosellas (R)	31 August 2008	Newcastle No.1 Sportsground, Newcastle	J. Taylor
2009	(11) South Newcastle Lions (R)	19 – 18	Macquarie Scorpions (R)	13 September 2009	Newcastle No.1 Sportsground, Newcastle	J. Taylor
2010	(6) Maitland Pickers (R)	22 – 4	Central Newcastle Butcher Boys (R)	19 September 2010	Newcastle No.1 Sportsground, Newcastle	D. Oultram	V
2011	(32) Western Suburbs Rosellas (R)	32 – 10	Wyong Roos (R)	18 September 2011	Newcastle No.1 Sportsground, Newcastle	J. Taylor	V
2012	(33) Western Suburbs Rosellas (R)	46 – 0	Maitland Pickers (R)	23 September 2012	Newcastle No.1 Sportsground, Newcastle	J. Taylor
2013	(4) Macquarie Scorpions (R)	32 – 16	Western Suburbs Rosellas (R)	22 September 2013	Newcastle No.1 Sportsground, Newcastle	T. Aylett	V1 V2
2014	(34) Western Suburbs Rosellas (R)	28 – 20	Central Newcastle Butcher Boys (R)	21 September 2014	Newcastle No.1 Sportsground, Newcastle	R. Walters	V
2015	(6) Lakes United Seagulls (R)	19 – 18	Western Suburbs Rosellas (R)	27 September 2015	Hunter Stadium, Newcastle	G. Stair	V
2016	(7) Lakes United Seagulls (R)	22 – 20	Western Suburbs Rosellas (R)	18 September 2016	Hunter Stadium, Newcastle	J. Taylor	V
2017	(35) Western Suburbs Rosellas (R)	31 – 12	South Newcastle Lions (R)	23 September 2017	McDonald Jones Stadium, Newcastle	T. Taylor	V
2018	(5) Macquarie Scorpions (R)	34 – 10	Central Newcastle Butcher Boys (R)	23 September 2018	McDonald Jones Stadium, Newcastle	T. Taylor	V
2019	(36) Western Suburbs Rosellas (R)	18 – 16	South Newcastle Lions (R)	22 September 2019	McDonald Jones Stadium, Newcastle	T. Taylor	V
2020	(37) Western Suburbs Rosellas (R)	13 – 12	Wyong Roos (R)	18 October 2020	Maitland Sportsground, Maitland	L. Matheson	V
2021	Competition cancelled due to Covid-19
2022	Northern Hawks	20 – 0	Western Suburbs Rosellas (R)	11 September 2022	McDonald Jones Stadium, Newcastle	T. Taylor	V
2023	(38) Western Suburbs Rosellas (R)	14 – 6	Maitland Pickers (R)	3 September 2023	McDonald Jones Stadium, Newcastle	B. Hunt	V
2024	(7) Maitland Pickers (R)	24 – 22	Lakes United Seagulls (R)	29 September 2024	McDonald Jones Stadium, Newcastle	K. Grogan	V
2025	(8) Maitland Pickers (R)	24 – 14	Lakes United Seagulls (R)	21 September 2025	McDonald Jones Stadium, Newcastle	J. Butler	V
2026	(3)Central Newcastle Butcher Boys (R)	44 - 8	Maitland Pickers (R)	6 September 2026	McDonald Jones Stadium, Newcastle

==== Team Performance ====
Team	Winners	Runners-up	Years won	Years runner-up
Western Suburbs Rosellas (R)	38	19	1913, 1914, 1915, 1940, 1953, 1960, 1961, 1962, 1965, 1966, 1967, 1968, 1969, 1971, 1972, 1975, 1979, 1982, 1984, 1986, 1988, 1989, 1992, 1996, 1997, 2000, 2001, 2002, 2003, 2005, 2007, 2011, 2012, 2014, 2017, 2019, 2020, 2023	1911, 1912, 1925, 1931, 1941, 1970, 1974, 1976, 1977, 1980, 1985, 1987, 1991, 1998, 2008, 2013, 2015, 2016, 2022
South Newcastle Lions (R)	11	14	1920, 1923, 1927, 1941, 1943, 1944, 1963, 1991, 1998, 1999, 2009	1924, 1930, 1942, 1947, 1948, 1957, 1969, 1986, 1990, 1993, 1994, 1997, 2017, 2019
North Newcastle Bluebags (R)	11	11	1910, 1911, 1912, 1922, 1926, 1930, 1931, 1935, 1937, 1945, 1950	1914, 1915, 1920, 1928, 1938, 1940, 1944, 1951, 1954, 1963, 1968
Cessnock Goannas (R)	10	12	1934, 1951, 1952, 1954, 1957, 1958, 1964, 1977, 1978, 1980	1933, 1935, 1949, 1950, 1953, 1955, 1956, 1981, 1983, 2001, 2002, 2007
Maitland Pickers (R)	8	17	1956, 1959, 1970, 1987, 1994, 2010, 2024, 2025	1960, 1961, 1962, 1965, 1966, 1971, 1972, 1973, 1978, 1979, 1982, 1988, 1989, 1995, 2012, 2023, 2026
Lakes United Seagulls (R)	7	9	1976, 1983, 1985, 1990, 1995, 2015, 2016	1959, 1967, 1975, 1992, 1999, 2000, 2004, 2024, 2025
Kurri Kurri Bulldogs (R)	5	5	1936, 1947, 1948, 1973, 1981	1929, 1937, 1945, 1964, 1996
Macquarie Scorpions (R)	5	1	1974, 2006, 2008, 2013, 2018	2009
Waratah-Mayfield Cheetahs (R)	4	5	1939, 1942, 1955, 1993	1936, 1943, 1952, 1958, 1984
East Newcastle (R)	4	2	1928, 1929, 1932, 1938	1922, 1926
Central Newcastle Butcher Boys (R)	3	5	1946, 1949, 2026	1913, 1939, 2010, 2014, 2018
Carrington	2	1	1924, 1925	1921
Maitland United Pumpkin Pickers (R)	1	3	1933	1927, 1932, 1934
Wyong Roos (R)	1	3	2004	2005, 2011, 2020
Broadmeadow	1	0	1921	—
Northern Hawks	1	0	2022	—
Waratah	0	1	—	1910
Toronto	0	1	—	1923
Belmont	0	1	—	1946
Raymond Terrace Magpies (R)	0	1	—	2003
Northern Blues (R)	0	1	—	2006

=== Third Grade ===
Year	Premiers	Score	Runners-up	Match Information
Year	Premiers	Score	Runners-up	Date	Venue	Referee	Video
Newcastle Rugby League Third Grade (1955–1980, 1984–96, 2001)
1955	South Newcastle (C)	10 – 2	Cessnock (C)
1956	Maitland Pumpkin Pickers (C)	10 – 9	Cessnock (C)
1957	Cessnock (C)	14 – 7	Maitland Pumpkin Pickers (C)
1958	(2) South Newcastle (C)	9 – 5	Cessnock (C)
1959	Lakes United Seagulls (C)	13 – 7	Western Suburbs Rosellas (C)
1960	(2) Maitland Pumpkin Pickers (C)	24 – 4	Cessnock (C)
1961	(3) Maitland Pumpkin Pickers (C)	9 – 7	Western Suburbs Rosellas (C)
1962	(4) Maitland Pumpkin Pickers (C)	13 – 11	Lakes United Seagulls (C)
1963	Western Suburbs Rosellas (C)	15 – 0	South Newcastle Lions (C)
1964	(2) Western Suburbs Rosellas (C)	28 – 6	Kurri Kurri Cooks (C)
1965	(3) Western Suburbs Rosellas (C)	30 – 15	Maitland Pumpkin Pickers (C)
1966	(4) Western Suburbs Rosellas (C)	41 – 0	Kurri Kurri Cooks (C)
1967	(5) Western Suburbs Rosellas (C)	16 – 10	Northern Suburbs Bluebags (C)	26 August 1967	Newcastle No.1 Sportsground, Newcastle	W. Humphries
1968	(6) Western Suburbs Rosellas (C)	12 – 0	South Newcastle Lions (C)
1969	(7) Western Suburbs Rosellas (C)	23 – 16	Maitland Pumpkin Pickers (C)
1970	(8) Western Suburbs Rosellas (C)	24 – 5	Maitland Pumpkin Pickers (C)
1971	(9) Western Suburbs Rosellas (C)	13 – 8	Lakes United Seagulls (C)
1972	(10) Western Suburbs Rosellas (C)	40 – 7	South Newcastle Lions (C)
1973	(3) South Newcastle Lions (C)	16 – 15	Western Suburbs Rosellas (C)
1974	(5) Maitland Pumpkin Pickers (C)	28 – 11	Northern Suburbs Bluebags (C)	15 September 1974	Newcastle No.1 Sportsground, Newcastle	J. Smith
1975	Northern Suburbs Bluebags (C)	16 – 9	Western Suburbs Rosellas (C)	14 September 1975	Newcastle No.1 Sportsground, Newcastle	K. Marker
1976	(11) Western Suburbs Rosellas (C)	39 – 2	Northern Suburbs Bluebags (C)	12 September 1976	Newcastle No.1 Sportsground, Newcastle	J. Geddes
1977	(6) Maitland Pumpkin Pickers (C)	27 – 9	Western Suburbs Rosellas (C)
1978	(2) Lakes United Seagulls (C)	18 – 11	Cessnock Goannas (C)	17 September 1978	Newcastle No.1 Sportsground, Newcastle	M. Walsh
1979	Central Charlestown Butcher Boys (C)	10 – 9	Western Suburbs Rosellas (C)	16 September 1979	Newcastle No.1 Sportsground, Newcastle	J. Manning
1980	(12) Western Suburbs Rosellas (C)	26 – 11	Cessnock Goannas (C)	14 September 1980	Newcastle No.1 Sportsground, Newcastle	G. Tranter
Newcastle Rugby League Under 23s (1981–83, 2013–14)
1981	Waratah-Mayfield Cheetahs (U23s)	24 – 23	Lakes United Seagulls (U23s)	20 September 1981	Newcastle No.1 Sportsground, Newcastle	R. Conley
1982	(4) South Newcastle Lions (U23s)	16 – 10	Western Suburbs Rosellas (U23s)
1983	(3) Lakes United Seagulls (U23s)	30 – 14	Macquarie Scorpions (U23s)	11 September 1983	Newcastle International Sports Centre, Newcastle	T. Garrett
Newcastle Rugby League Third Grade (1955–1980, 1984–96, 2001)
1984	(13) Western Suburbs Rosellas (C)	17 – 0	Maitland Pumpkin Pickers (C)	9 September 1984	Newcastle International Sports Centre, Newcastle	G. Newman
1985	(2) Waratah-Mayfield Cheetahs (C)		Lakes United Seagulls (C)	8 September 1985	Newcastle International Sports Centre, Newcastle	R. Williams
1986	Kurri Kurri Bulldogs (C)		Waratah-Mayfield Cheetahs (C)	14 September 1986	Newcastle International Sports Centre, Newcastle	C. Russell
1987	(14) Western Suburbs Rosellas (C)	28 – 8	South Newcastle Lions (C)	30 August 1987	Newcastle No.1 Sportsground, Newcastle	J. Crich
1988	(7) Maitland Pumpkin Pickers (C)	18 – 12	Western Suburbs Rosellas (C)	21 August 1988	Newcastle International Sports Centre, Newcastle	C. McCarthy
1989	(15) Western Suburbs Rosellas (C)	10 – 2	South Newcastle Lions (C)	3 September 1989	Newcastle International Sports Centre, Newcastle	S. Crich
1990	(3) Waratah-Mayfield Cheetahs (C)		Cessnock Goannas (C)	19 August 1990	Harker Oval, Newcastle	R. Aurelius
1991	(16) Western Suburbs Rosellas (C)	18 – 14	Lakes United Seagulls (C)	1 September 1991	Harker Oval, Newcastle	T. Davis
1992	(17) Western Suburbs Rosellas (C)	14 – 3	Waratah-Mayfield Cheetahs (C)	6 September 1992	Harker Oval, Newcastle	P. Riddell	V
1993	(4) Waratah-Mayfield Cheetahs (C)		Lakes United Seagulls (C)	29 August 1993	Newcastle No.1 Sportsground, Newcastle	T. Sutcliffe
1994	(4) Lakes United Seagulls (C)	28 – 6	Western Suburbs Rosellas (C)	28 August 1994	Newcastle No.1 Sportsground, Newcastle	T. Yarrow
1995	(18) Western Suburbs Rosellas (C)	14 – 8	Lakes United Seagulls (C)	20 August 1995	Newcastle No.1 Sportsground, Newcastle	G. Stair
1996	(5) South Newcastle Lions (C)	8 – 0	Western Suburbs Rosellas (C)	1 September 1996	Newcastle No.1 Sportsground, Newcastle	T. Sutcliffe
Newcastle Rugby League Under 20s (1997–99, 2002)
1997	(5) Lakes United Seagulls (U20s)	16 – 14	Western Suburbs Rosellas (U20s)	7 September 1997	Newcastle No.1 Sportsground, Newcastle	D. Andrews
1998	(19) Western Suburbs Rosellas (U20s)	36 – 6	South Newcastle Lions (U20s)	23 August 1998	Newcastle No.1 Sportsground, Newcastle	T. Hardy
1999	(20) Western Suburbs Rosellas (U20s)	36 – 10	South Newcastle Lions (U20s)	22 August 1999	Newcastle No.1 Sportsground, Newcastle	D. Andrews
Newcastle Rugby League Under 19s (2000, 2009)
2000	(21) Western Suburbs Rosellas (U19s)	36 – 12	Central Charlestown Butcher Boys (U19s)	10 September 2000	Newcastle No.1 Sportsground, Newcastle	T. Hardy
Newcastle Rugby League Third Grade (1955–1980, 1984–96, 2001)
2001	Raymond Terrace Magpies (C)	28 – 10	Western Suburbs Rosellas (C)	26 August 2001	Newcastle No.1 Sportsground, Newcastle	J. Taylor
Newcastle Rugby League Under 20s (1997–99, 2002)
2002	(22) Western Suburbs Rosellas (U20s)	30 – 10	Lakes United Seagulls (U20s)	8 September 2002	Newcastle No.1 Sportsground, Newcastle	A. Hinds
Newcastle Rugby League Open Age (2003–08, 2015–19)
2003	Wyong Roos (C)		Lakes United Seagulls (C)	31 August 2003	Newcastle No.1 Sportsground, Newcastle	G. Ryan
2004	(23) Western Suburbs Rosellas (C)	10 – 8	Wyong Roos (C)	5 September 2004	Newcastle No.1 Sportsground, Newcastle	S. Wyld
2005	(24) Western Suburbs Rosellas (C)	38 – 14	South Newcastle Lions (C)	11 September 2005	Newcastle No.1 Sportsground, Newcastle	S. Wyld
2006	(6) South Newcastle Lions (C)	34 – 22	Western Suburbs Rosellas (C)	3 September 2006	Newcastle No.1 Sportsground, Newcastle	D. Oultram
2007	(2) Wyong Roos (C)	38 – 18	Western Suburbs Rosellas (C)	2 September 2007	Newcastle No.1 Sportsground, Newcastle	G. Stair
2008	Macquarie Scorpions (C)	13 – 12	Western Suburbs Rosellas (C)	31 August 2008	Newcastle No.1 Sportsground, Newcastle	G. Stair
Newcastle Rugby League Under 19s (2000, 2009)
2009	(25) Western Suburbs Rosellas (U19s)	26 – 20	South Newcastle Lions (U19s)	13 September 2009	Newcastle No.1 Sportsground, Newcastle	S. Smith
Newcastle Rugby League Presidents Cup (2010–12)
2010	(26) Western Suburbs Rosellas (C)	34 – 18	Wyong Roos (C)	19 September 2010	Newcastle No.1 Sportsground, Newcastle	J. Taylor
2011	(27) Western Suburbs Rosellas (C)	22 – 20	South Newcastle Lions (C)	18 September 2011	Newcastle No.1 Sportsground, Newcastle	T. Aylett
2012	(28) Western Suburbs Rosellas (C)	28 – 10	Wyong Roos (C)	23 September 2012	Newcastle No.1 Sportsground, Newcastle	T. Aylett
Newcastle Rugby League Under 23s (1981–83, 2013–14)
2013	(2) Central Newcastle Butcher Boys (U23s)		South Newcastle Lions (U23s)	22 September 2013	Newcastle No.1 Sportsground, Newcastle	G. Stair
2014	(3) Central Newcastle Butcher Boys (U23s)	17 – 16	South Newcastle Lions (U23s)	21 September 2014	Newcastle No.1 Sportsground, Newcastle	T. Aylett	V
Newcastle Rugby League Open Age (2003–08, 2015–19)
2015	(2) Kurri Kurri Bulldogs (C)	16 – 6	South Newcastle Lions (C)	27 September 2015	Hunter Stadium, Newcastle	T. Aylett	V
2016	(6) Lakes United Seagulls (C)	18 – 12	Kurri Kurri Bulldogs (C)	18 September 2016	Hunter Stadium, Newcastle	G. Stair	V
2017	No Third Grade competition held
2018	(7) South Newcastle Lions (C)	22 – 6	Macquarie Scorpions (C)	23 September 2018	McDonald Jones Stadium, Newcastle	G. Stair	V
2019	(8) Maitland Pickers (C)	20 – 16	Western Suburbs Rosellas (C)	22 September 2019	McDonald Jones Stadium, Newcastle	J. White	V
2020	Competition cancelled due to Covid-19
2021	No Third Grade competition held
2022	No Third Grade competition held
2023	No Third Grade competition held
2024	No Third Grade competition held
2025	No Third Grade competition held
Newcastle Rugby League Open Grade (2026–Present)
2026	(3) Kurri Kurri Bulldogs (C)	22 – 8	Western Suburbs Rosellas (C)	7 August 2026	Harker Oval, Newcastle	B. Barrie	V

==== Team Performance ====
Team	Winners	Runners-up	Years won	Years runner-up
Western Suburbs Rosellas (C, U23s, U20s, U19s)	28	17	1963, 1964, 1965, 1966, 1967, 1968, 1969, 1970, 1971, 1972, 1976, 1980, 1984, 1987, 1989, 1991, 1992, 1995, 1998, 1999, 2000, 2002, 2004, 2005, 2009, 2010, 2011, 2012	1959, 1961, 1973, 1975, 1977, 1979, 1982, 1988, 1994, 1996, 1997, 2001, 2006, 2007, 2008, 2019, 2026
Maitland Pickers (C)	8	5	1956, 1960, 1961, 1962, 1974, 1977, 1988, 2019	1957, 1965, 1969, 1970, 1984
South Newcastle Lions (C, U23s, U20s, U19s)	7	13	1955, 1958, 1973, 1982, 1996, 2006, 2018	1963, 1968, 1972, 1987, 1989, 1998, 1999, 2005, 2011, 2015, 2009, 2013, 2014
Lakes United Seagulls (C, U23s, U20s)	6	9	1959, 1978, 1983, 1994, 1997, 2016	1962, 1971, 1981, 1985, 1991, 1992, 1993, 1995, 2003
Waratah-Mayfield Cheetahs (C, U23s)	4	2	1981, 1985, 1990, 1993	1986, 1992
Kurri Kurri Bulldogs (C)	3	3	1986, 2015, 2026	1964, 1966, 2016
Central Newcastle Butcher Boys (C, U23s, U19s)	3	1	1979, 2013, 2014	2000
Wyong Roos (C)	2	3	2003, 2007	2004, 2010, 2012
Cessnock Goannas (C)	1	6	1957	1955, 1956, 1958, 1978, 1980, 1990
North Newcastle Bluebags (C)	1	3	1975	1967, 1974, 1976
Macquarie Scorpions (C, U23s)	1	2	2007	1983, 2018
Raymond Terrace Magpies (C)	1	0	2001	—

=== Under 19s ===
Year	Premiers	Score	Runners-up	Match Information
Year	Premiers	Score	Runners-up	Date	Venue	Referee	Video
Newcastle Rugby League Under 19s (2008, 2015–present)
2008	Central Charleston Butcher Boys (U19s)	def	Wyong Roos (U19s)	31 August 2008	Newcastle No.1 Sportsground, Newcastle	D. Oultram
2009	Under 19s played as Third Grade competition
2010	No Under 19s competition held
2011	No Under 19s competition held
2012	No Under 19s competition held
Newcastle Rugby League Under 18s Division 1 (2013–14)
2013	Lakes United Seagulls (U18s)	28 – 4	Maitland Pickers (U18s)	22 September 2013	Newcastle No.1 Sportsground, Newcastle	B. Teague
2014	Western Suburbs Rosellas (U18s)	16 – 8	Maitland Pickers (U18s)	21 September 2014	Newcastle No.1 Sportsground, Newcastle	C. Mitchell	V
Newcastle Rugby League Under 19s (2008, 2015–present)
2015	(2) Central Newcastle Butcher Boys (U19s)	14 – 12	Maitland Pickers (U19s)	27 September 2015	Hunter Stadium, Newcastle	T. Taylor	V
2016	(2) Lakes United Seagulls (U19s)	12 – 8	Central Newcastle Butcher Boys (U19s)	18 September 2016	Hunter Stadium, Newcastle	J. Flett	V
2017	Cessnock Goannas (U19s)	16 – 6	Lakes United Seagulls (U19s)	23 September 2017	McDonald Jones Stadium, Newcastle	D. Clarke	V
2018	Maitland Pickers (U19s)	13 – 6	Western Suburbs Rosellas (U19s)	23 September 2018	McDonald Jones Stadium, Newcastle	B. Eyb	V
2019	(3) Lakes United Seagulls (U19s)	14 – 4	Western Suburbs Rosellas (U19s)	22 September 2019	McDonald Jones Stadium, Newcastle	B. Eyb	V
2020	(3) Central Newcastle Butcher Boys (U19s)	26 – 24	Lakes United Seagulls (U19s)	18 October 2020	Maitland Sportsground, Maitland	B. Eyb	V
2021	Competition cancelled due to Covid-19
2022	(2) Western Suburbs Rosellas (U19s)	22 – 16	Lakes United Seagulls (U19s)	11 September 2022	McDonald Jones Stadium, Newcastle	B. Hunt	V
2023	(4) Lakes United Seagulls (U19s)	14 – 11	Western Suburbs Rosellas (U19s)	3 September 2023	McDonald Jones Stadium, Newcastle	S. Daley	V
2024	(5) Lakes United Seagulls (U19s)	32 – 12	Western Suburbs Rosellas (U19s)	29 September 2024	McDonald Jones Stadium, Newcastle	T. Taylor	V
2025	South Newcastle Lions (U19s)	18 – 16	Western Suburbs Rosellas (U19s)	21 September 2025	McDonald Jones Stadium, Newcastle	T. Taylor	V
2026	The Entrance Tigers (U19s)	24 - 22	South Newcastle Lions (U19s)	6 September 2026	McDonald Jones Stadium, Newcastle

==== Team Performance ====
Team	Winners	Runners-up	Years won	Years runner-up
Lakes United Seagulls (U19s, U18s)	5	3	2013, 2016, 2019, 2023, 2024	2017, 2020, 2022
Central Newcastle Butcher Boys (U19s, U18s)	3	1	2008, 2015, 2020	2016
Western Suburbs Rosellas (U19s, U18s)	2	5	2014, 2022	2018, 2019, 2023, 2024, 2025
Maitland Pickers (U19s, U18s)	1	3	2018	2013, 2014, 2015
South Newcastle Lions (U19s)	1	1	2025	2026
Cessnock Goannas (U19s)	1	0	2017	—
The Entrance Tigers (U19s)	1	0	2026	—
Wyong Roos (U19s)	0	1	—	2008

=== Women's ===
Year	Premiers	Score	Runners-up	Match Information
Year	Premiers	Score	Runners-up	Date	Venue	Referee	Video
Newcastle Rugby League Women's Premiership (2024–present)
2024	Maitland Pickers (W)	16 – 10	Lakes United Seagulls (W)	29 September 2024	McDonald Jones Stadium, Newcastle	S. Daley	V
2025	(2) Maitland Pickers (W)	27 – 26	Northern Hawks (W)	21 September 2025	McDonald Jones Stadium, Newcastle	J. Fisher	V
2026	Central Newcastle Butcher Boys (W)	22 - 18	South Newcastle Lions (W)	6 September 2026	McDonald Jones Stadium, Newcastle

==== Team Performance ====
Team	Winners	Runners-up	Years won	Years runner-up
Maitland Pickers (W)	2	0	2024, 2025	—
Central Newcastle Butcher Birds (W)	1	0	2026	
Lakes United Seagulls (W)	0	1	—	2024
Northern Hawks (W)	0	1	—	2025

== Team of the Century ==
In 2008, rugby league football's centennial year in Australia, the Newcastle Rugby League named its 'Team of the Century':

1. Clive Churchill (Central Newcastle)
2. Eddie Lumsden (Kurri Kurri)
3. Ron Bailey (Waratah-Mayfield)
4. Brian Carlson (North)
5. Johnny Graves (Maitland)
6. Bob Banks (Central Newcastle)
7. Andrew Johns (Cessnock)
8. Paul Harragon (Lakes United)
9. Allan Buman (West Newcastle)
10. Jim Gibbs (South Newcastle)
11. Don Schofield (Cessnock)
12. Herb Narvo (North Newcastle)
13. (c) Wally Prigg (West Newcastle)
14. John Sattler (Kurri Kurri)
15. Albert Paul (Lakes United)
16. Matthew Gidley (West Newcastle)
17. Les Johns (South Newcastle)

== See also ==
- Rugby League Competitions in Australia
- Rugby league in New South Wales
