= Wyong Roos =

Australian rugby league club, based in Kanwal, NSW

Club information
- Full name: Wyong Rugby League Football Club
- Colours: Green, Gold
- Founded: 1910; 116 years ago
- Website: wyongroos.com.au

Current details
- Ground: Morry Breen Oval Kanwal, New South Wales
- Coach: Tony Gleeson
- Competition: Central Coast Division Rugby League; Newcastle Rugby League
- 2024 Denton Cup: 6th

Records
- Premierships: 22 (1928, 1929, 1930, 1931, 1932, 1934, 1936, 1947, 1968, 1969, 1971, 1974, 1982, 1990, 1992, 1996, 1997, 2002, 2009, 2014, 2016, 2026)

The Wyong Rugby League Football Club are an Australian rugby league club based on the Central Coast of New South Wales. The club competed in the New South Wales Cup from 2013 to 2018 and still competes in the Central Coast Division Rugby League. The club's colours are green and gold, the home ground of the club is the Morry Breen Oval in Kanwal, New South Wales.

== History ==
=== 1910–1919 ===
A Wyong District Rugby League Competition was formed by F.G (Gersh) Baker and S.A.McKinnon in 1910. Many of the players had previously played rugby union. Wyong joined the Newcastle Rugby League in 1912, competing in Second Grade that season, and again in 1913 and 1914. In 1915, the Wyong & District Association was formed and matches commenced between Wyong, Erina, Gosford, Ourimbah and Matcham.

=== 1919–1947 ===
In 1919 the Wyong and District Rugby League was formed which included teams from Jilliby, Kincumber, Nords Wharf and Yarramalong. Wyong were unable to consistently field a team during the war years with some players choosing to play with Ourimbah. Races (dogs and horses) were held every Saturday at Wyong or Tuggerah and interest declined, forcing Wyong to withdraw from the 1925 competition and not re-forming until 1929 when they won their first officially recorded premiership.

Further premierships were won in 1930, 1931, 1932, 1934 and 1936. During this time the Wyong Rugby League Association became the Erina Rugby League Association with many members of the Wyong Club, including Gersh Baker, holding most of the executive positions.

This competition collapsed in 1937 with most Wyong players electing to join other clubs. Wyong struggled in the years leading up to, and during, the war and eventually disbanded again in 1942. In 1944 they combined with Morriset to play in the Newcastle competition.

=== 1947–1959 ===
In 1947 the Central Coast Rugby League Association was formed. Wyong, with Ted Watts as coach, won the premiership in all three grades. This success did not last and Wyong struggled for the next decade. Wyong teams continually finished on the bottom of the ladder in all grades and eventually withdrew from all competitions in 1958 due to lack of interest, player unrest and poor administration. Most Wyong players left to play with other clubs in the 1958 and 1959 season. The club was reformed in 1960 after a meeting convened by Artie Mollett at Wyong Memorial Hall.

=== 1960–1980 ===
Following the reformation of the Wyong Rugby league Football Club in 1960 a junior club with Russell Potter as president and George Glading as Secretary/Manager was established in 1961. In 1963 Morry Breen was appointed as Wyong's first grade coach. It was one of the most significant appointments in Wyong's history as Breen instilled a style of play and culture that was to lead to ongoing success in the '70s and '80s. Breen arrived at Wyong after an extensive career playing and coaching in North Queensland, NSW Country and with Brisbane Souths and Eastern Suburbs. He was a visionary and was a major force in the establishment of a licensed club in 1973. With Dennis Smith as coach Wyong won the premiership in 1968, 1969, 1971 and 1974.

In 1970 Wyong Rugby League Club became an incorporated body to be known as Wyong District Rugby League Football Club. This ensured that the licensed club, that was to be established and the football club were the one, and same, body. Land was purchased to establish such a club in 1971 and, after obtaining a liquor licence in 1972, the licensed club was opened by Australian Rugby League President, Kevin Humphreys in June, 1973. The main playing field was named Morry Breen Oval. Wyong continued its dominance in the '70s winning four consecutive club championships between 1973 and 1976.

=== 1980–1990 ===
Wyong, with Paul Taylor as captain/coach, won the 1982 Grand Final defeating arch rivals Woy Woy 28–10. There was a lot of controversy before the game when the selectors could not reach consensus on the make-up of the team and Taylor insisted on making numerous changes to the team that had defeated Umina in the preliminary final.

Wyong reached the grand final in 1987, 1988 and 1989 but were unfortunately beaten in all games. However, the '80s could be looked on as a very successful era. Of 46 grand finals played in all grades between 1980 and 1989 Wyong had played in 24 for 13 premierships and had also taken out the club championship four times.

Another highlight of the decade occurred in 1986 when the Wyong under 16s, coached by Mick Kent, completed their time in junior football with nine successive premierships. In nine seasons the team played 167 games for eight losses and four draws. Tony Newbury, Adam Aiken, Steve Carter, Darren Barratt, Lee Sharp and Damian Kent played in all grand finals.

=== 1990–2000 ===
The '90s began well with former Canterbury half-back, Mal Creevey, as coach, leading the team to a well-deserved premiership in 1990 after the three successive losses. Wyong dominated the '90s consistently winning the club championship and playing in seven grand finals. Premierships followed in 1992 & 1996 (coached by Robert “Rip” Taylor) and 1997 (coached by former North Sydney player, John McArthur). This was a time of upheaval in rugby league with News Limited creating a Super League competition in 1997. Because of Wyong's dominance there was speculation that Wyong would join Super League or be part of a revamped ARL competition.

=== 2000–present ===
After defeating the Tweed Heads Seagulls in the 2002 Country Challenge Cup, then winning premierships in 1st and 2nd Grade and another club championship Wyong made the decision in 2003 to join the Newcastle Rugby League Competition. At the same time they were still fielding teams in the Central Coast competition – six teams in all, which was to become a huge burden on players and resources. Under new coach, Paul Stringer, Wyong withdrew from all Central Coast competition in 2007 and made the NRLC Grand Final, only to be beaten by Lakes United. Wyong were able to avenge this defeat in 2009 when they defeated Cessnock 36–4.

At the end of the 2012, season Wyong decided to pull out of the Newcastle competition and enter a team in the 2013 NSW Cup. At the same Wyong announced that all senior teams would return to play on the Central Coast. They won the 2013 Under 18s and Reserve Grade Premierships as well as the Club Championship.

Wyong were competitive in the 2013 NSW Cup, winning five games including two wins against the Bulldogs and an away win against Auckland. Mitch Williams was judged the NSW Cup 2013 'Player of the Year' and was also chosen in the NSW Cup 2013 'Team of the Year'.

In 2014 the Wyong Roos, with Rip Taylor replacing Paul Stringer as coach and strengthened with the signing of Mark O'Meley, won 13 games to make the finals, eventually finishing 7th. Wyong again won the Central Coast Club Championship in 2014, winning the first grade, Under 19s and Open Grade premierships.

In 2015, Wyong made the NSW Cup grand final against The Newcastle Knights at Parramatta Stadium. The game was a hard-fought contest but in the end Newcastle defeated Wyong by 20–10.

In 2016, Wyong finished 6th at the end of the regular season. In the first week of the finals they defeated Canterbury 19–18. They then played against Wests Tigers for a spot in the preliminary final but lost the match 26–16. .

In 2017, Wyong finished as minor premiers in the regular season of The Intrust Super Premiership NSW. Wyong then went on to qualify for the grand final against Penrith. On 24 September at Leichhardt Oval, Wyong were defeated by Penrith 20–12.

In March 2018, Wyong announced that their partnership as the Sydney Roosters feeder side would be ending at the conclusion of the season. Wyong qualified for the finals series in 2018 and defeated the Western Suburbs Magpies in week one to progress to the following week. On 9 September 2018, Wyong were defeated 34–24 by Canterbury ending their season. Following the end of the 2018 season, coach Rip Taylor departed the club to become the new head coach of the Wentworthville Magpies.

In November 2018, it was announced that Wyong would not be competing in the 2019 Intrust Super Premiership NSW season with the South Sydney Rabbitohs taking their place.

Wyong Roos re-entered the Newcastle Rugby League in 2020, but departed in 2026 to focus fully on the Central Coast competition.

== Licensed club and playing fields ==
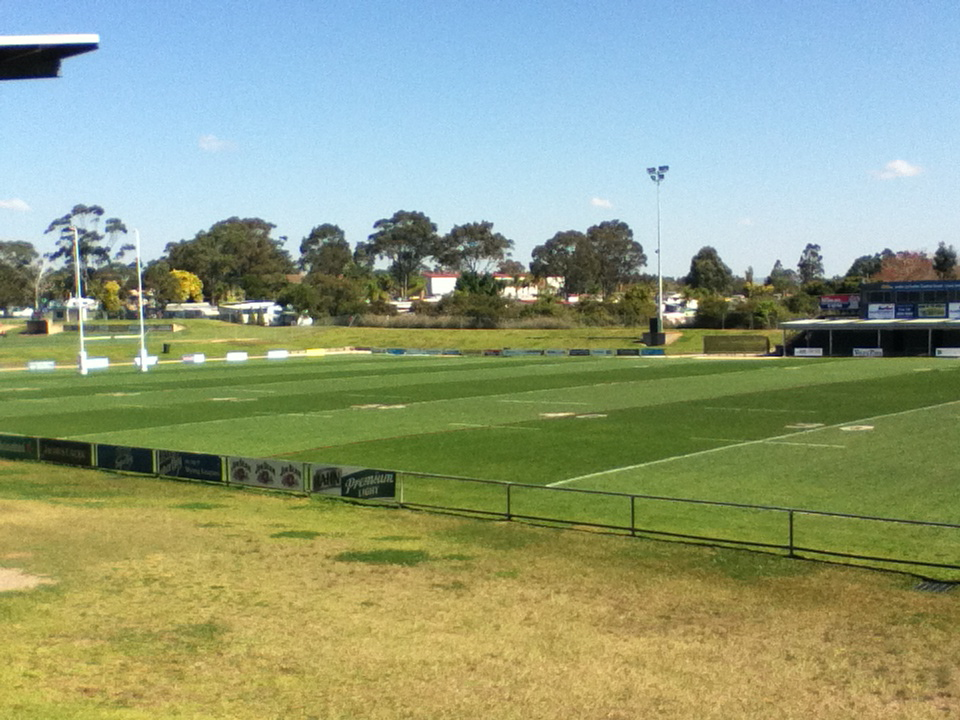
Morry Breen Oval, Kanwal, New South Wales, Australia.

Irregular meetings were held during the '60s about establishing a licensed club but nothing eventuated until 1971 when the President, Joe Bishop, announced that six acres of land had been purchased at Kanwal to build such a club and playing fields. Kanwal was ten kilometres north of Wyong but had been recognised as growth area. The choice to go to Kanwal was led by Morry Breen.

A licence was obtained in 1972 and the club was officially opened by the President of the Australian Rugby League in June, 1973. The ground was named Morry Breen Oval in recognition of Breen's vision and determination to see the project succeed. A further 26 acres was purchased on adjoining land in 1977. This proved to be a very astute decision. Between 1986 and 1992 the club had been placed in official receivership. However, the development and sale of this land and with the support of banks and creditors the club was able to overcome all its financial difficulties, enabling it to grow and expand rapidly. In recent years it has acquired ownership of the Central Coast Masonic Club, Toukley Bowling Club, Wyong Bowling Club, Budgewoi Soccer Club, Avoca Beach Bowling Club and Goulburn Railway Bowling Club, giving it a membership of over 35,000.

== Notable Juniors ==
- Steve Carter (1988–2002 Penrith Panthers & Widnes Vikings)
- Grant Millington (2008–present Canterbury Bulldogs & Cronulla Sharks)
- Paul Carter (2014–17 Gold Coast Titans, South Sydney Rabbitohs)
- Willis Meehan (2014 Sydney Roosters)
- Mitch Williams (2015 Sydney Roosters)
- Josh Mantellato (2013–16 Newcastle Knights, Hull Kingston Rovers)
- Jacob Liddle (2016-present Wests Tigers, St. George Illawarra Dragons)
- Adam Keighran (2019–present New Zealand Warriors & Sydney Roosters)

== Honours and Records ==
=== Team ===
==== NSWRL 2nd Tier ====
- Runners-up (1): 2015, 2017
- Minor Premiers (1): 2017

==== Newcastle ====
- Premierships (1): 2009.
- Runners-up (1): 2007.
- Reserve Grade (2): 2003, 2004.
- Open Age (1): 2007.
- Wyong were Grand Finalists in a Southern Newcastle B Grade competition in 1946, but the result is not known.

==== Central Coast ====
- Premierships (21): 1928, 1929, 1930, 1931, 1932, 1934 (Club), 1936, 1947, 1968, 1969, 1971, 1974, 1982, 1990, 1992, 1996, 1997, 2002, 2014, 2016, 2026.
- Runners-up (21): 1919, 1926, 1927, 1967, 1970, 1973, 1975, 1977, 1979, 1981, 1987, 1988, 1989, 1993, 1994, 1995, 1999, 2000, 2017, 2018, 2019.
- Reserve Grade (20): 1927, 1930, 1936, 1947, 1951, 1969, 1971, 1972, 1975, 1978, 1979, 1986, 1987, 1988, 1994, 1997, 2001, 2002, 2013, 2026.
- Ladies League Tag (1): 2019.
- Open Age(4): 2014, 2019, 2025, 2026.
- Third Grade (12): 1947, 1974, 1979, 1980, 1984, 1986, 1987, 1988, 1992, 1993, 1995, 1996.
- D Grade (1): 1957 (as Wyong-Morisset).
- Under 19 (6): 1967, 1981, 2000, 2002, 2014, 2016.
- Under 18 (10): 1969, 1970, 1978, 1984, 1985, 1995, 1996, 1998, 1999, 2013.
- Under 17 (2): 1982, 2000.
- Under 16 (11): 1968, 1970, 1977, 1984, 1986, 1996, 1998, 2002, 2009, 2010, 2012.
- Under 16 Division 2 (1): 2008.
- First Grade Knock-Out (6): 1923, 1926, 1927, 1929, 1930, 1936.
- Second Grade Knock-Out (4): 1926, 1927, 1932, 1934.

== See also ==
- National Rugby League reserves affiliations
- List of rugby league clubs in Australia
