= John Bucknall =

Australian rugby league footballer

Personal information
- Full name: John Bucknall

Playing information
- Position: Second-row, Prop
Club
Years	Team	Pld	T	G	FG	P
1969–73	Manly-Warringah	55	2	0	0	6
Representative
Years	Team	Pld	T	G	FG	P
1973	New South Wales	1	0	0	0	0
- Source: As of 5 April 2019

John Bucknall is an Australian former rugby league footballer who played in 1960s and 1970s. He played for Manly-Warringah in the New South Wales Rugby League (NSWRL) competition.

== Playing career ==
Bucknall made his first grade debut for Manly in 1969. In 1970, Manly reached the grand final against South Sydney. Bucknall played at second-row in the grand final and is best remembered for playing in this match. During the first half, Bucknall punched Souths captain John Sattler in the face during an off the ball incident breaking Sattler's jaw. Sattler then told teammate Mike Cleary "Hold me up so they don't know I'm hurt". Souths led the grand final at the half time break and it was only then that the Souths players learnt of Sattler's injury.

In the second half, Bucknall was targeted by the South Sydney players and Manly went on to lose the grand final 23–12. Bucknall did not play any games for Manly in 1971 but returned to the side in 1972. Bucknall was not selected to play in Manly's maiden grand final victory over Eastern Suburbs.

In 1973, Bucknall was selected to play for New South Wales against Queensland. Manly also reached their second grand final in a row after claiming the minor premiership in 1973. Bucknall played from the bench in the 1973 NSWRL grand final against Cronulla-Sutherland as the club won its second premiership defeating Cronulla 10–7 in a bruising final. This would be Bucknall's last game for Manly and he retired as a premiership winning player.

== Post playing ==
In 2014, John Sattler spoke to the Daily Telegraph and declared after 44 years that he had finally forgiven Bucknall for breaking his jaw in the 1970 grand final. Sattler said that he had never spoken to Bucknall after the match even though in the years since Bucknall had wanted to apologize and declare a truce. Sattler said "I wanted nothing to do with it, “Do I hate Bucknall? No, I don’t, Have I forgiven him? Yes, I have".
