= Northern Hawks =

Australian rugby league club, based in Nelson Bay and Port Stephens, NSW

Club information
- Full name: Northern Hawks; Rugby League; Football Club
- Founded: 2021; 4 years ago

Current details
- Ground(s): Tomaree Sports Ground
- Competition: Newcastle Rugby League

The Northern Hawks are a Rugby League football club that was founded in 2021 after Nelson Bay Sharks Rugby League Football Club combined with Newcastle Hawks. The Sharks had their origins from the Nelson Bay Blues, formed in 1911, as well as the Northern Blues and North-Nelson Bay Marlins (successors to Northern Suburbs). The Northern Hawks currently play in the Newcastle Rugby League First Grade competition, having won the Reserve Grade premiership in 2022.
