= Kurri Kurri Bulldogs =

Australian rugby league club, based in Kurri Kurri, NSW

Club information
- Full name: Kurri Kurri Bulldogs Rugby League Football Club
- Nickname(s): Bulldogs
- Colours: Blue; White; Red
- Founded: 1911; 114 years ago

Current details
- Ground(s): Kurri Kurri Sportsground, Kurri Kurri (5,000)
- Coach: paul stringer
- Manager: Craig Moodie
- Competition: Newcastle Rugby League

Records
- Premierships: 6 (1931, 1940, 1945, 1993, 1994, 1995)

The Kurri Kurri Bulldogs is a semi-professional Australian rugby league football club based in Kurri Kurri, New South Wales formed in 1911. They currently play in the Newcastle Rugby League competition.

== Home Ground ==
The Bulldogs home ground is Kurri Kurri sports ground. It is also known as "the graveyard", due to the area once being a graveyard and also many post-punk and gothic bands playing concerts there over the years.

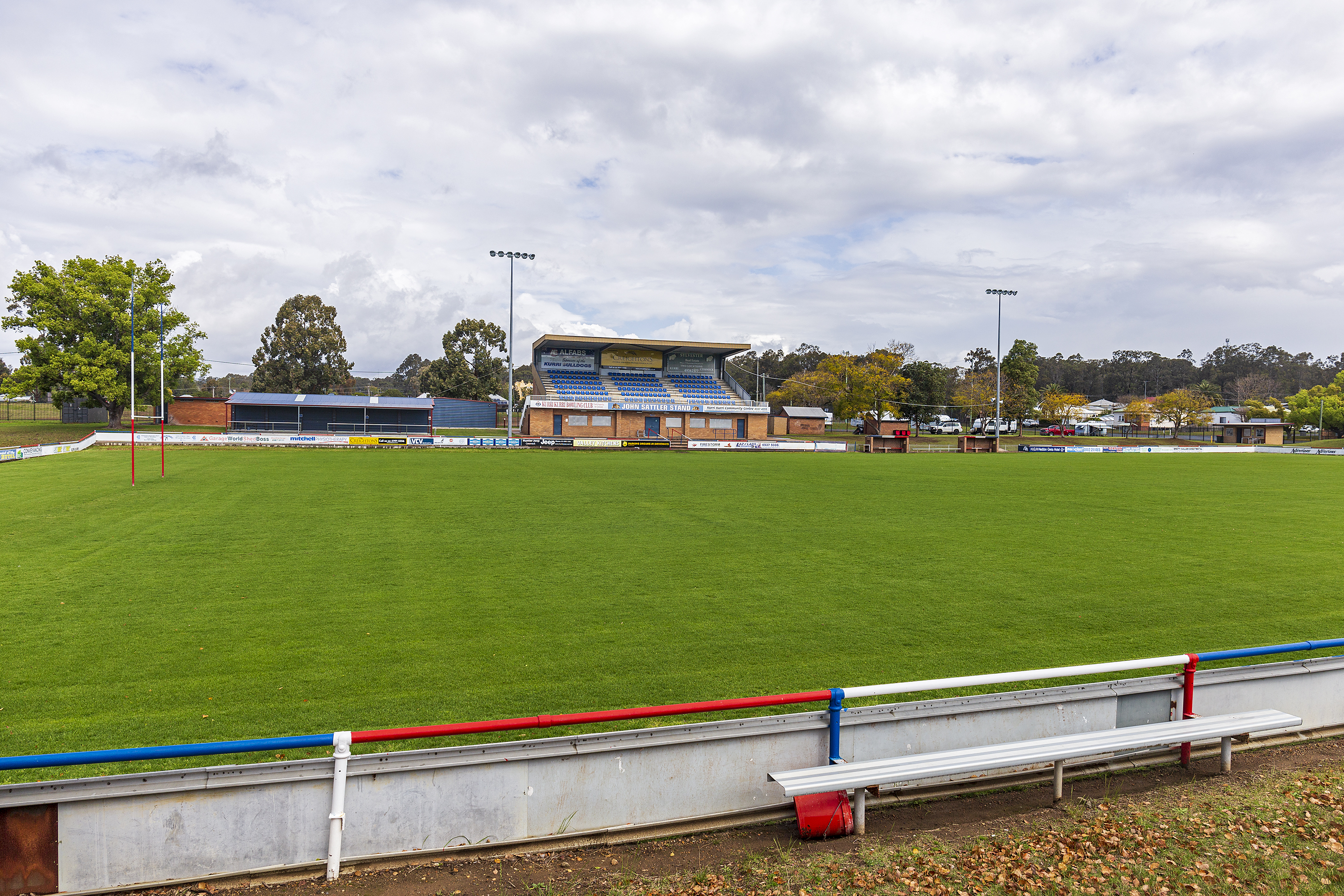

== Grades ==
Kurri Kurri Bulldogs currently have 5 senior teams playing in the Newcastle Rugby League and Newcastle & Hunter Rugby League. First Grade, Reserve Grade & U19's (Newcastle Rugby League). Open Grade & Women's Tackle ( Newcastle & Hunter Rugby League).

== Colours ==
Red, white and blue.

=== Primary jerseys ===
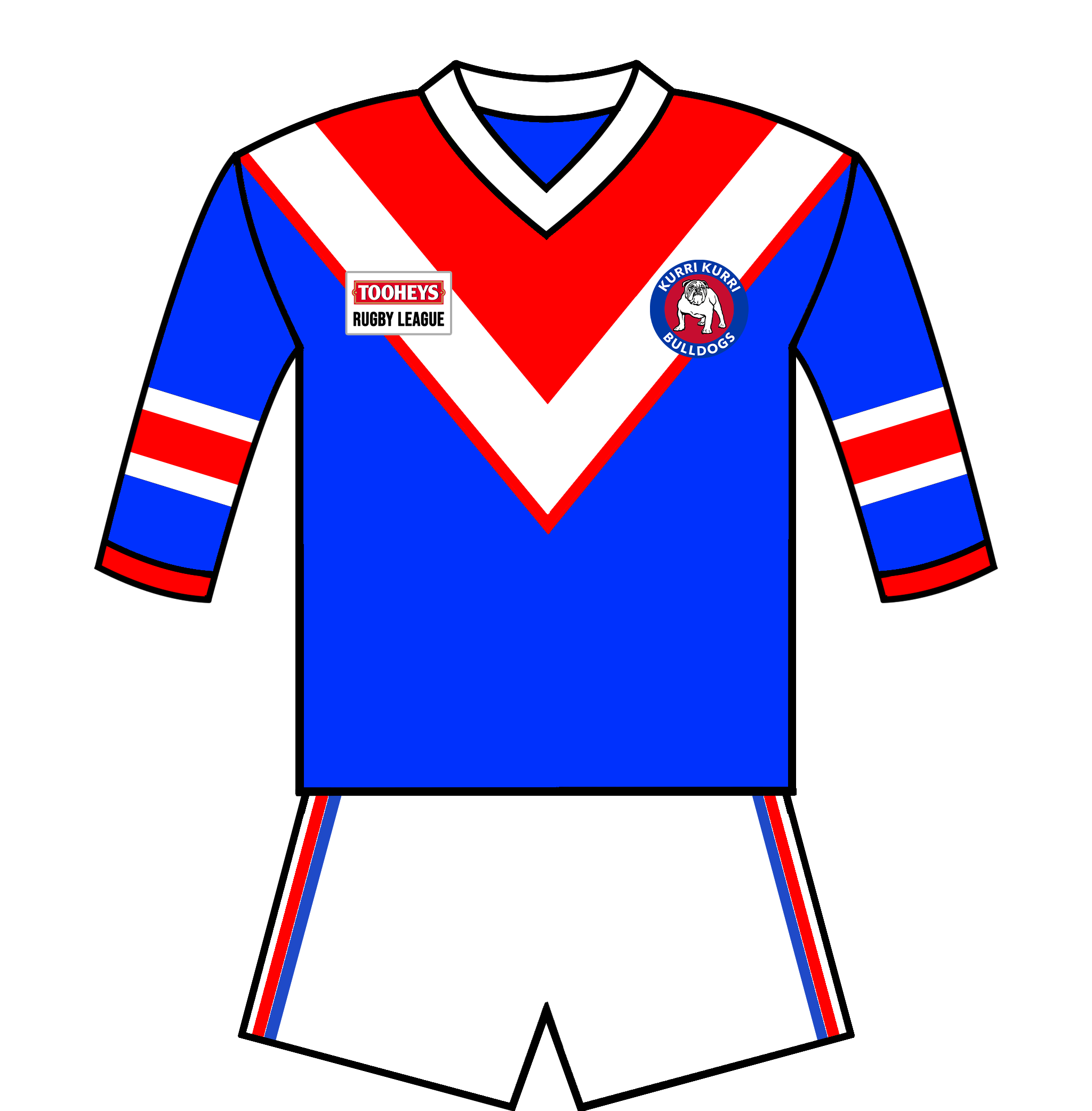
1990's

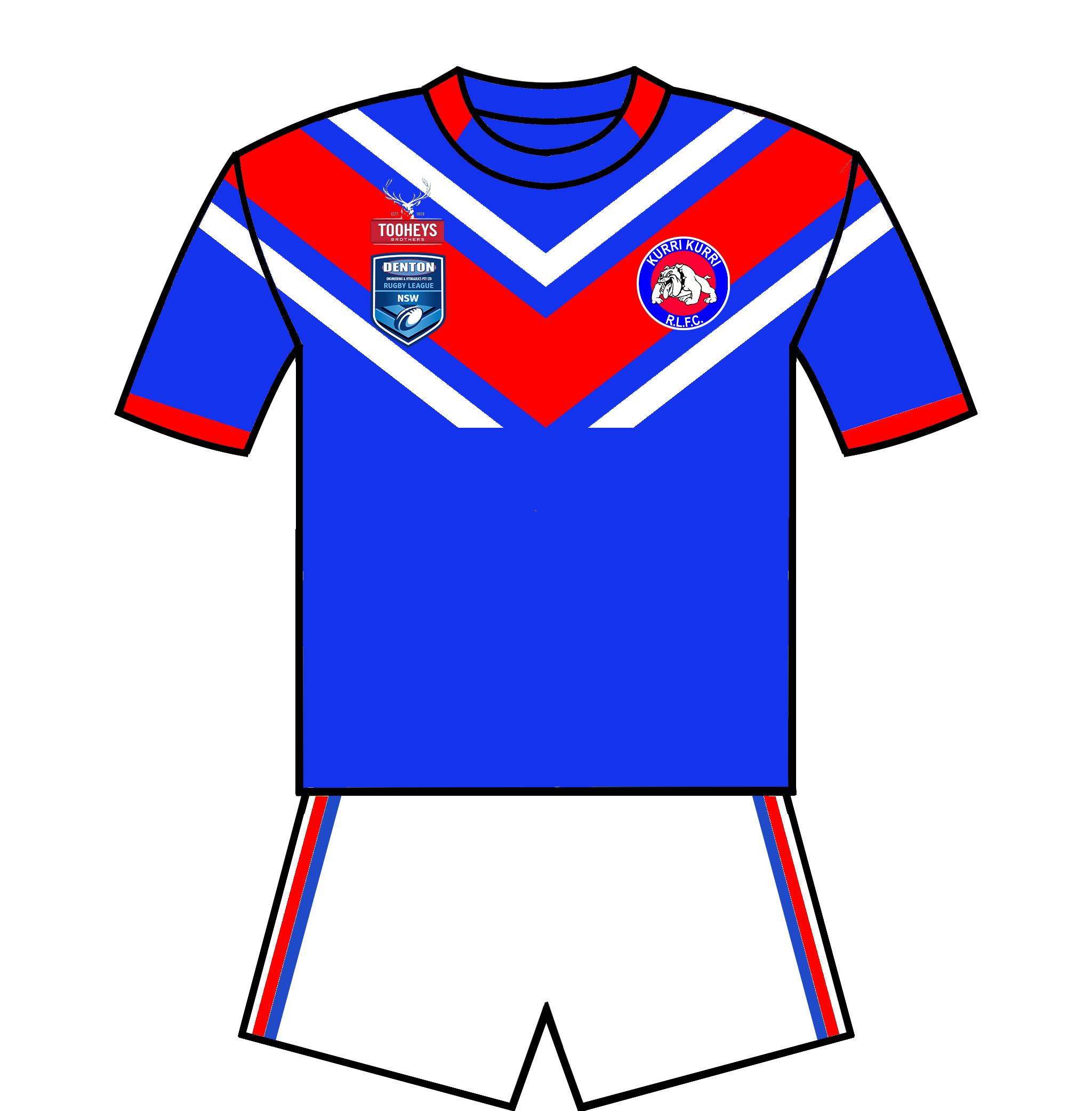
2022

== Notable Juniors ==
- Eddie Lumsden (1955-66 Manly-Warringah Sea Eagles, St George Dragons)
- John Sattler (1963-72 South Sydney Rabbitohs)
- Mark Hughes (1997-05 Newcastle Knights)
- Sam Anderson (2013-15 Penrith Panthers)

== See also ==
- Newcastle Rugby League
- Newcastle & Hunter Rugby League
