= John Sattler =

Australian rugby league footballer (1942–2023)

Personal information
- Born: 28 July 1942 Telarah, New South Wales, Australia
- Died: 20 March 2023 (aged 80) Southport, Queensland, Australia

Playing information
- Position: Prop
Club
Years	Team	Pld	T	G	FG	P
1959–62	Kurri Kurri	38
1963–72	South Sydney	197	12	0	0	36
1973–74	Wests (Brisbane)	38	4
1975	Norths (Brisbane)	13	2
	Total	286	18	0	0	36
Representative
Years	Team	Pld	T	G	FG	P
1962	Newcastle
1969	New South Wales	4	0	0	0	0
1973	Queensland	4	0	0	0	0
1967–71	Australia	4	0	0	0	0
- Source: As of 31 August 2006
- Relatives: Scott Sattler (son)

John William Sattler (28 July 1942 – 20 March 2023) was an Australian professional rugby league footballer played as a prop in the 1960s and 1970s. He captained South Sydney to four premiership victories from 1967 to 1971 and who played four Tests for Australia – three as national captain. Known as "Satts", he was one of the hardmen of Australian rugby league and was regarded as an aggressive on field player but a softly spoken gentleman off the field – hence his other nickname "Gentleman John". His son Scott Sattler also played professionally, winning a premiership with the Penrith Panthers in 2003.

== Club career ==
John Sattler was born in 1942 at Telarah, New South Wales, and moved to Kurri Kurri with his family when he was 12 years old. His paternal great-great-grandfather, Peter Sattler, was a German immigrant who arrived in Maitland in the late 1890s aged 6. He attended Marist Brothers High School in Maitland, New South Wales, Sattler began playing rugby league at the late age of 16 for Kurri Kurri and represented Newcastle against the touring British side in 1962. The following year he moved to Sydney and joined the South Sydney Rabbitohs.

In 1967 he was appointed South Sydney Rabbitohs' captain and led them to premiership wins in the four seasons of 1967, 1968, 1970 and 1971. He also captained his team in the Grand Final in 1969 where they lost to Balmain. He could play at lock forward but played his best football and enjoyed his premiership and national representative success as a prop forward.

After 195 games with South Sydney, and four premiership victories, John Sattler signed for Brisbane Western Suburbs in 1973.

In 1975 he signed with Norths Devils as their captain-coach (13 first grade premiership games, scoring two tries).

=== 1970 grand final ===
In the 1970 grand final, Sattler played with a broken jaw to help Souths to victory over Manly. In the premiership decider of 1970 South Sydney were up against the Manly-Warringah Sea Eagles at the Sydney Cricket Ground on 19 September. Having lost the previous Grand Final to the Balmain Tigers, Souths were desperate to win. Approximately ten minutes into the game Sattler collapsed after being hit with a forearm by Manly forward John Bucknall while not in possession of the ball. He suffered a double fracture to his jaw but pleaded to teammate Mike Cleary, "Hold me up so they don't know I'm hurt". He was helped up and continued to play in the game. At half time Souths were leading 12–6 when his teammates learnt about his injury.

During the interval he refused treatment and insisted he continue playing. He also told the side, "the next bloke who tries to cut me out of the play is in trouble", to prevent his teammates trying to protect him from further injury. At the end of the game South Sydney had scored 3 tries to nil in a 23–12 victory. He later went to hospital to receive treatment but only after receiving the Giltinan Shield and making an acceptance speech.

John Bucknall did not finish the game.

== Representative career ==
Being injured during the 1970 Grand Final, he was not selected as captain for the Australian touring side announced later that night for the World Cup in England. However he had previously been selected in Australia's tour of Britain and France in 1967 and in the Australian teams which toured New Zealand in 1969 and 1971, in which he was selected as captain. He only managed to play in four tests for Australia, captaining his nation in three out of those four games.

He captained the Queensland state side against New South Wales in 1973 before retiring from professional rugby league the following year.

Sattler was sent off fifteen times during his career and served a total of 30 weeks of suspensions. But he is remembered for his physical and mental toughness rather than his poor disciplinary record.

== Post playing ==
In the mid-1980s John Sattler was involved in one of the unsuccessful bids to form a Brisbane-based team for the New South Wales Rugby League premiership.

In February 2008, Sattler was named in the list of Australia's 100 Greatest Players (1908–2007) which was commissioned by the NRL and ARL to celebrate the code's centenary year in Australia.

In 2010 he was named as captain of Kurri Rugby League Club's team of the century.

Sattler entered the hotel business, first in Gladstone, and later at places such as Bribie Island, Queen's hotel in Southport and Broadbeach.

He was supporter of the Southport-based Gold Coast Vikings and was part of the consortium which gained a licence for the Tweed Heads-based Gold Coast-Tweed Giants in the 1988 NSWRL premiership.

In 2014 he released an autobiography Glory, Glory: My Life.

=== Legacy ===
John Sattler saved a man's life from an oncoming train at Jannali railway station.

He was inducted as a Life Member of the South Sydney Football Club in 1972, the first player to be bestowed with such an honour while still playing.

In 2004, John was named Captain of South Sydney's "Dream Team" and in 2010 received a similar honour in Kurri Kurri Rugby League's "Team of the Century". In 2012, John was honoured when the grandstand at Kurri Kurri Rugby League Ground was named after him.

In 2007, John was the Australia Day Ambassador to Cessnock.

Australian artist Perry Keyes released a song "The Day John Sattler Broke his Jaw" in 2007. Music reviewer Lauren Katulka said the song deserved to be an Australian classic: "It was so good that I wondered why we don’t all know it, the way we know 'Khe Sanh' and 'The Horses'". Indie band The Whitlams in its iteration with the Black Stump Band covered it in 2022. Frontman Tim Freedman described it as "the greatest song ever written about rugby league". The video clip features footage of the 1970 grand final.

Round 4 2023 Rabbitohs wore a commemorative jersey featuring the famous "torn rabbit" which was made famous in Sattler's 1970 Grand Final performance, with the Sattler family joining the playing staff for a minute's silence prior to kick-off against Manly Warringah Sea Eagles the same club from that grand final At the 13th minute, the Accor Stadium crowd – led by The Burrow – brought in a minute-long applause in honour of Sattler, who wore the no.13 jersey in his 10-year career in the Cardinal and Myrtle. Rabbitohs won 13–12 in extra time victory, capping off a successful day for the club, with every grade winning their matches.

== Footnotes ==
Preceded by John Raper	Australian national rugby league captain 1969–1970	Succeeded by Graeme Langlands
