= Mata'utia =

Mata'utia may refer to:

- Chanel Mata'utia (born 1992), Australian former professional rugby league footballer
- Pat Mata'utia (born 1993), Samoa international rugby league footballer
- Peter Mata'utia (born 1990), Samoa international rugby league footballer
- Sione Mata'utia (born 1996), professional rugby league footballer
- Tuiafono Mata'utia, former Speaker of the American Samoa House of Representatives
