= 2016 Manly Warringah Sea Eagles season =

Australian football season

- NRL rank: 13th
- 2016 record: Wins: 8; losses: 16
- Points scored: For: 454; against: 563

Team information
- CEO: (Australia) Joe Kelly
- Coach: (Australia) Trent Barrett
- Assistant coach: (Australia) John Cartwright
- Captain: (Australia) Jamie Lyon
- Stadium: Brookvale Oval
- Avg. attendance: 10,974

Top scorers
- Tries: Jorge Taufua (12)
- Points: Jamie Lyon (116)
← 2015	2017 →

The 2016 Manly Warringah Sea Eagles season was the 67th in the club's history. The year also represented the 70th anniversary of the Manly Warringah Sea Eagles since their entry into the then New South Wales Rugby Football League premiership in 1947.

The 2016 Sea Eagles will be coached by rookie coach, former Australian international Trent Barrett. The team captain is Jamie Lyon with Brett Stewart and Daly Cherry-Evans named as vice-captains. The club will compete in the National Rugby League's 2016 Telstra Premiership.

== Squad list ==
=== Signings/transfers ===
==== Gains ====
- Rhys Armstrong from Wests Tigers
- Lewis Brown from Penrith Panthers
- Addin Fonua-Blake from St George Illawarra Dragons
- Pita Godinet from Wakefield Trinity Wildcats
- Fabian Goodall from Parramatta Eels
- Nathan Green from St George Illawarra Dragons
- Isaac John from Penrith Panthers
- Dylan Kelly from Berkeley Vale Panthers
- Apisai Koroisau from Penrith Panthers
- Halauafu Lavaka from Parramatta Eels
- Darcy Lussick from Parramatta Eels
- Tim Moltzen from Wests Tigers
- Nate Myles from Gold Coast Titans
- Matt Parcell from Brisbane Broncos
- Martin Taupau from Wests Tigers
- Siosaia Vave from Cronulla-Sutherland Sharks
- Dylan Walker from South Sydney Rabbitohs
- Matthew Wright from North Queensland Cowboys
- Tom Wright from rugby union

==== Losses ====
- Matt Ballin to Wests Tigers
- Cheyse Blair to Melbourne Storm
- Michael Chee-Kam to Wests Tigers
- Kieran Foran to Parramatta Eels
- Clinton Gutherson to Parramatta Eels
- James Hasson to Parramatta Eels
- Peta Hiku to Penrith Panthers
- Justin Horo to Catalans Dragons
- Jack Littlejohn to Wests Tigers
- Dunamis Lui to St George Illawarra Dragons
- Willie Mason to Catalans Dragons
- Will Pearsall to Newcastle Knights
- Ligi Sao to New Zealand Warriors
- Jesse Sene-Lefao to Cronulla Sharks

== Ladder ==
2016 NRL season
Pos	Team	Pld	W	D	L	B	PF	PA	PD	Pts
1	Melbourne Storm	24	19	0	5	2	563	302	+261	42
2	Canberra Raiders	24	17	1	6	2	688	456	+232	39
3	Cronulla-Sutherland Sharks (P)	24	17	1	6	2	580	404	+176	39
4	North Queensland Cowboys	24	15	0	9	2	584	355	+229	34
5	Brisbane Broncos	24	15	0	9	2	554	434	+120	34
6	Penrith Panthers	24	14	0	10	2	563	463	+100	32
7	Canterbury-Bankstown Bulldogs	24	14	0	10	2	506	448	+58	32
8	Gold Coast Titans	24	11	1	12	2	508	497	+11	27
9	Wests Tigers	24	11	0	13	2	499	607	−108	26
10	New Zealand Warriors	24	10	0	14	2	513	601	−88	24
11	St. George Illawarra Dragons	24	10	0	14	2	341	538	−197	24
12	South Sydney Rabbitohs	24	9	0	15	2	473	549	−76	22
13	Manly-Warringah Sea Eagles	24	8	0	16	2	454	563	−109	20
14	Parramatta Eels	24	13	0	11	2	298	324	−26	18^{1}
15	Sydney Roosters	24	6	0	18	2	443	576	−133	16
16	Newcastle Knights	24	1	1	22	2	305	800	−495	7

^{1} Parramatta were deducted 12 competition points and their for/against tally accumulated between rounds 1-9 for gross long-term salary cap breaches.

== Fixtures ==
2016 NRL draw - Manly-Warringah Sea Eagles.

=== Regular season ===
Friday 4 March	Manly-Warringah Sea Eagles	6 – 28	Canterbury-Bankstown Bulldogs	Brookvale Oval, Sydney
8:05pm (AEDT)	Tries: Jorge Taufua; Goals: Jamie Lyon (1/1)	[ Report]	Tries: Sam Perrett, Will Hopoate, Sam Kasiano, Josh Morris, Curtis Rona; Goals: Moses Mbye (4/6)	Attendance: 16,512; Referee: Gerard Sutton, Matt Noyen; Player of the Match: James Graham

Monday 14 March	Wests Tigers	36 – 22	Manly-Warringah Sea Eagles	Leichhardt Oval, Sydney
7:35pm (AEDT)	Tries: James Tedesco (3), David Nofoaluma (2), Kevin Naiqama, Jordan Rankin; Goals: Mitchell Moses (4/8)	[ Report]	Tries: Lewis Brown, Dylan Walker, Jorge Taufua, Martin Taupau; Goals: Jamie Lyon (3/5)	Attendance: 11,269; Referee: Henry Perenara, Chris James; Player of the Match: James Tedesco

Monday 21 March	Manly-Warringah Sea Eagles	22 – 12	Cronulla-Sutherland Sharks	Brookvale Oval, Sydney
7:35pm (AEDT)	Tries: Matt Parcell, Brett Stewart, Jake Trbojevic, Tom Trbojevic; Goals: Jamie Lyon (3/4)	[ Report]	Tries: Luke Lewis, Valentine Holmes; Goals: James Maloney (2/4)	Attendance: 5,122; Referee: Ben Cummins, Adam Devcich; Player of the Match: Matt Parcell

Saturday 26 March	Sydney Roosters	20 – 22	Manly-Warringah Sea Eagles	Allianz Stadium, Sydney
7:35pm (AEDT)	Tries: Shaun Kenny-Dowall (2), Blake Ferguson, Daniel Tupou; Goals: Sio Siua Taukeiaho (1/4); Jackson Hastings (1/1)	[ Report]	Tries: Jorge Taufua, Dylan Walker, Jamie Lyon; Goals: Jamie Lyon (5/5)	Attendance: 12,271; Referee: Grant Atkins, Gavin Reynolds; Player of the Match: Jamie Lyon

Thursday 31 March	Manly-Warringah Sea Eagles	12 – 16	South Sydney Rabbitohs	Brookvale Oval, Sydney
8:05pm (AEDT)	Tries: Dylan Walker, Apisai Koroisau; Goals: Jamie Lyon (2/2)	[ Report]	Tries: Cameron McInnes (2), Cody Walker; Goals: Cody Walker (2/3)	Attendance: 9,603; Referee: Gerard Sutton, Matt Noyen; Player of the Match: Apisai Koroisau

Saturday 9 April	New Zealand Warriors	18 – 34	Manly-Warringah Sea Eagles	Mount Smart Stadium, Auckland
	Tries: Blake Ayshford, Issac Luke, Solomone Kata; Goals: Shaun Johnson (3/3)	[ Report]	Tries: Steve Matai (2), Martin Taupau, Josh Starling, Tom Trbojevic; Goals: Jamie Lyon (7/7)	Attendance: 16,112; Referee: Gavin Reynolds, Chris Sutton; Player of the Match: Tom Symonds

Thursday 14 April	Manly-Warringah Sea Eagles	10 – 22	Parramatta Eels	Brookvale Oval, Sydney
8:05pm (AEST)	Tries: Jamie Lyon; Goals: Jamie Lyon (3/3)	[ Report]	Tries: Michael Jennings (2), Brad Takairangi, Semi Radradra; Goals: Michael Gordon (3/5)	Attendance: 14,660; Referee: Ben Cummins, Adam Devcich; Player of the Match: Nathan Peats

Monday 25 April	Newcastle Knights	10 – 26	Manly-Warringah Sea Eagles	Hunter Stadium, Newcastle
2:00pm (AEST)	Tries: Nathan Ross, Tyler Randell; Goals: Trent Hodkinson (1/2)	[ Report]	Tries: Brenton Lawrence, Brayden Wiliame, Tom Trbojevic, Jake Trbojevic; Goals: Jamie Lyon (5/6)	Attendance: 19,072; Referee: Gavin Badger, Chris Sutton; Player of the Match: Jake Trbojevic

Saturday 30 April	Manly-Warringah Sea Eagles	18 – 34	North Queensland Cowboys	Brookvale Oval, Sydney
8:05pm (AEST)	Tries: Jamie Lyon, Daly Cherry-Evans, Pita Godinet; Goals: Jamie Lyon (3/3)	[ Report]	Tries: Kyle Feldt (2), Antonio Winterstein, Michael Morgan, Gavin Cooper, Kane Linnett; Goals: Johnathan Thurston (5/6)	Attendance: 11,734; Referee: Ben Cummins, Chris Sutton; Player of the Match: Johnathan Thurston

Saturday 14 May*	Manly-Warringah Sea Eagles	6 – 30	Brisbane Broncos	Suncorp Stadium, Brisbane
7:45pm (AEST)	Tries: Martin Taupau; Goals: Jamie Lyon (1/1)	[ Report]	Tries: Anthony Milford (2), Darius Boyd, Sam Thaiday, Corey Oates; Goals: Jordan Kahu (5/6)	Attendance: 52,347; Referee: Jared Maxwell, Gavin Reynolds; Player of the Match: Anthony Milford

Saturday 21 May	Cronulla-Sutherland Sharks	20 – 12	Manly-Warringah Sea Eagles	Southern Cross Group Stadium, Sydney
7:30pm (AEST)	Tries: Sosaia Feki, Valentine Holmes, Ben Barba; Goals: James Maloney (4/5)	[ Report]	Tries: Tom Trbojevic, Jamie Buhrer, Brayden Wiliame; Goals: Jamie Lyon (0/3)	Attendance: 16,601; Referee: Gavin Badger, Alan Shortall; Player of the Match: James Maloney

Bye

Friday 3 June	Canberra Raiders	30 – 18	Manly-Warringah Sea Eagles	GIO Stadium, Canberra
7:30pm (AEST)	Tries: Brenko Lee, Josh Hodgson, Elliott Whitehead, Jack Wighton, Josh Papalii; Goals: Jarrod Croker (5/5)	[ Report]	Tries: Daly Cherry-Evans, Matt Parcell, Apisai Koroisau; Goals: Jamie Lyon (1/1); Dylan Walker (2/2)	Attendance: 9,157; Referee: Jared Maxwell, Adam Gee; Player of the Match: Joseph Leilua

Sunday 12 June	Manly-Warringah Sea Eagles	24 – 31	Penrith Panthers	Brookvale Oval, Sydney
3:30pm (AEST)	Tries: Dylan Walker (2), Tom Trbojevic, Jorge Taufua; Goals: Dylan Walker (4/5)	[ Report]	Tries: Tyrone Peachey, Josh Mansour, Nathan Cleary, Leilani Latu, Peter Wallace, Waqa Blake; Goals: Matt Moylan (0/2); Peter Wallace (3/4); Field Goals: Matt Moylan	Attendance: 12,463; Referee: Grant Atkins, Gavin Reynolds; Player of the Match: Nathan Cleary

Monday 20 June	Gold Coast Titans	30 – 10	Manly-Warringah Sea Eagles	Cbus Super Stadium, Gold Coast
7:00pm (AEST)	Tries: Luke Douglas, Anthony Don, Josh Hoffman, Ryan James, Nene Macdonald; Goals: Tyrone Roberts (5/6)	[ Report]	Tries: Jorge Taufua, Brayden Wiliame; Goals: Api Koroisau (1/2)	Attendance: 8,278; Referee: Henry Perenara, Alan Shortall; Player of the Match: Ryan James

Monday 27 June	North Queensland Cowboys	30 – 26	Manly-Warringah Sea Eagles	1300SMILES Stadium, Townsville
7:00pm (AEST)	Tries: Jason Taumalolo (2), Antonio Winterstein, Lachlan Coote, James Tamou; Goals: Johnathan Thurston (5/5)	[ Report]	Tries: Addin Fonua-Blake (2), Daly Cherry-Evans, Siosaia Vave, Lewis Brown; Goals: Dylan Walker (0/1); Jamie Lyon (3/4)	Attendance: 15,854; Referee: Matt Cecchin, Chris Butler; Player of the Match: Jason Taumalolo

Monday 4 July	Manly-Warringah Sea Eagles	36 – 6	St George Illawarra Dragons	Brookvale Oval, Sydney
7:00pm (AEST)	Tries: Dylan Walker (2), Jorge Taufua (2), Nathan Green, Jamie Buhrer, Brayden Wiliame; Goals: Jamie Lyon (4/7); Dylan Walker (0/1)	[ Report]	Tries: Josh Dugan; Goals: Gareth Widdop (1/1)	Attendance: 9,048; Referee: Ashley Klein, Henry Perenara; Player of the Match: Jamie Buhrer

Bye

Saturday 16 July*	Manly-Warringah Sea Eagles	15 – 14 (gp)	New Zealand Warriors	nib Stadium, Perth
3:30pm (AWST)	Tries: Tom Trbojevic, Jorge Taufua; Goals: Jamie Lyon (3/3); Field Goals: Daly Cherry-Evans	[ Report]	Tries: Bunty Afoa (2); Goals: Issac Luke (3/4)	Attendance: 11,109; Referee: Gavin Badger, Chris James; Player of the Match: Jake Trbojevic

Monday 25 July	South Sydney Rabbitohs	12 – 20	Manly-Warringah Sea Eagles	Allianz Stadium, Sydney
7:00pm (AEST)	Tries: Adam Reynolds, Cody Walker; Goals: Adam Reynolds (2/2)	[ Report]	Tries: Jamie Lyon, Jorge Taufua, Tom Trbojevic; Goals: Jamie Lyon (4/5)	Attendance: 8,273; Referee: Henry Perenara, Chris Butler; Player of the Match: Tom Trbojevic

Saturday 30 July	Manly-Warringah Sea Eagles	36 – 16	Newcastle Knights	Brookvale Oval, Sydney
4:00pm (AEST)	Tries: Brayden Wiliame (2), Jorge Taufua, Jamie Buhrer, Josh Starling, Dylan Walker, Matthew Wright; Goals: Api Koroisau (0/2); Dylan Walker (4/5)	[ Report]	Tries: Peter Mata'utia, David Bhana, Brendan Elliot; Goals: Trent Hodkinson (2/2); Dane Gagai (0/1)	Attendance: 11,222; Referee: Gavin Badger, Adam Devcich; Player of the Match: Tom Trbojevic

Friday 5 August	Parramatta Eels	10 – 9	Manly-Warringah Sea Eagles	Pirtek Stadium, Sydney
7:50pm (AEST)	Tries: Bevan French; Goals: Michael Gordon (3/3)	[ Report]	Tries: Api Koroisau; Goals: Dylan Walker (2/2); Field Goals: Daly Cherry-Evans	Attendance: 8,143; Referee: Matt Cecchin, Chris James; Player of the Match: Danny Wicks

Thursday 11 August	Canterbury-Bankstown Bulldogs	20 – 16 (gp)	Manly-Warringah Sea Eagles	ANZ Stadium, Sydney
7:50pm (AEST)	Tries: Brett Morris (2), Sam Perrett, Josh Reynolds; Goals: Moses Mbye (2/3)	[ Report]	Tries: Daly Cherry-Evans, Matthew Wright, Jorge Taufua; Goals: Jamie Lyon (2/4)	Attendance: 10,290; Referee: Ashley Klein, Adam Gee; Player of the Match: Josh Reynolds

Saturday 20 August	Manly-Warringah Sea Eagles	18 – 38	Melbourne Storm	Brookvale Oval, Sydney
5:00pm (AEST)	Tries: Brad Parker (2), Jorge Taufua; Goals: Matthew Wright (3/3)	[ Report]	Tries: Suliasi Vunivalu (4), Kenny Bromwich, Cameron Smith, Felise Kaufusi; Goals: Cameron Smith (4/6); Tohu Harris (1/1)	Attendance: 8,241; Referee: Henry Perenara, Chris James; Player of the Match: Cameron Smith

Saturday 27 August	Manly-Warringah Sea Eagles	30 – 44	Canberra Raiders	Brookvale Oval, Sydney
2:30pm (AEST)	Tries: Tom Trbojevic (3), Jake Trbojevic, Daly Cherry-Evans, Frank Winterstein; Goals: Matthew Wright (3/6)	[ Report]	Tries: Jordan Rapana (3), Joseph Leilua (2), Paul Vaughan, Edrick Lee, Jack Wighton; Goals: Jarrod Croker (6/8)	Attendance: 11,137; Referee: Ben Cummins, Gavin Badger; Player of the Match: Jordan Rapana

Sunday 4 September	Penrith Panthers	36 – 6	Manly-Warringah Sea Eagles	Pepper Stadium, Sydney
6:00pm (AEST)	Tries: Josh Mansour (2), Bryce Cartwright, Dallin Watene Zelezniak, Peter Wallace, Waqa Blake; Goals: Nathan Cleary (6/6)	[ Report]	Tries: Jake Trbojevic; Goals: Matthew Wright (1/1)	Attendance: 15,411; Referee: Grant Atkins, Chris Sutton; Player of the Match: Bryce Cartwright

* 14 May - Manly home game despite playing Brisbane Broncos in Brisbane. Match played as part of an NRL double header at Suncorp Stadium.
* 16 July - Manly home game played in Perth.

== Player statistics ==
Note: Games and (sub) show total games played, e.g. 1 (1) is 2 games played.

Player	Games (sub)	Tries	Goals	FG	Points
(Australia) Bill Bainbridge	(1)				
(New Zealand) Lewis Brown	16 (8)	2			8
(Australia) Jamie Buhrer	15	3			12
(England) Luke Burgess	(2)				
(Australia) Daly Cherry-Evans (vc)	19	4		2	18
(New Zealand) Addin Fonua-Blake	4 (10)	2			8
(Samoa) Pita Godinet	2	1			4
(Australia) Nathan Green	7 (2)	1			4
(Australia) Apisai Koroisau	17 (1)	3	1/2		14
(Australia) Brenton Lawrence	2 (8)				
(Australia) Blake Leary	1 (12)				
(Australia) Darcy Lussick	15 (3)				
(Australia) Jamie Lyon (c)	17	4	50/65		116
(Australia) Liam Knight	(1)				
(New Zealand) Steve Matai	8	2			8
(Tonga) Feleti Mateo	2 (1)				
(Australia) Nate Myles	14 (2)				
(Australia) Matt Parcell	11 (4)	2			8
(Australia) Brad Parker	4	2			8
(Australia) Josh Starling	4 (15)	2			8
(Australia) Brett Stewart (vc)	11	1			4
(Australia) Tom Symonds	5 (1)				
(Tonga) Jorge Taufua	18	12			48
(New Zealand) Martin Taupau	19	3			12
(Australia) Jake Trbojevic	23	4			16
(Australia) Tom Trbojevic	23	10			40
(Tonga) Siosaia Vave	1 (22)	1			4
(Australia) Dylan Walker	18	8	12/16		52
(Fiji) Brayden Wiliame	18	6			24
(Samoa) Frank Winterstein	2 (1)	1			4
(Samoa) Matthew Wright	14 (1)	2	7/10		22
TOTAL		75	70/93	2	454

- On 27 April, Manly team captain Jamie Lyon announced that he would retire from playing at the end of the 2016 NRL season after 17 seasons of first grade and representative football in both the NRL and the Super League.
- Tim Moltzen retired from playing effective immediately on 6 May 2016 due to chronic knee injuries. He was replaced in the squad by Matthew Wright who was signed mid-season after being granted a release from the North Queensland Cowboys.
- On 15 June, Tom Symonds signed a 3½ year deal with the Huddersfield Giants in the Super League after being released from his contract by Manly.
- On 23 June the Manly-Warringah Sea Eagles released Luke Burgess and Feleti Mateo from their contracts. Both players had signed with Super League team the Salford Red Devils the previous day.

== Awards ==
Manly Warringah 2016 Club Awards (NRL only).

- Roy Bull Best & Fairest: Tom Trbojevic
- Gordon Willoughby Medal - Members’ Player of the Year: Jake Trbojevic
- Doug Daley Memorial Award - Clubman of the Year: Brenton Lawrence
- Players’ Player Award: Jake Trbojevic
- Ken Arthurson Award - Rookie of the Year: Addin Fonua-Blake
- Leading point scorer: Jamie Lyon (116 - 4 tries, 50 goals)
- Leading try scorer: Jorge Taufua (12)
