= Chanel Mata'utia =

Samoan/Australian rugby league footballer

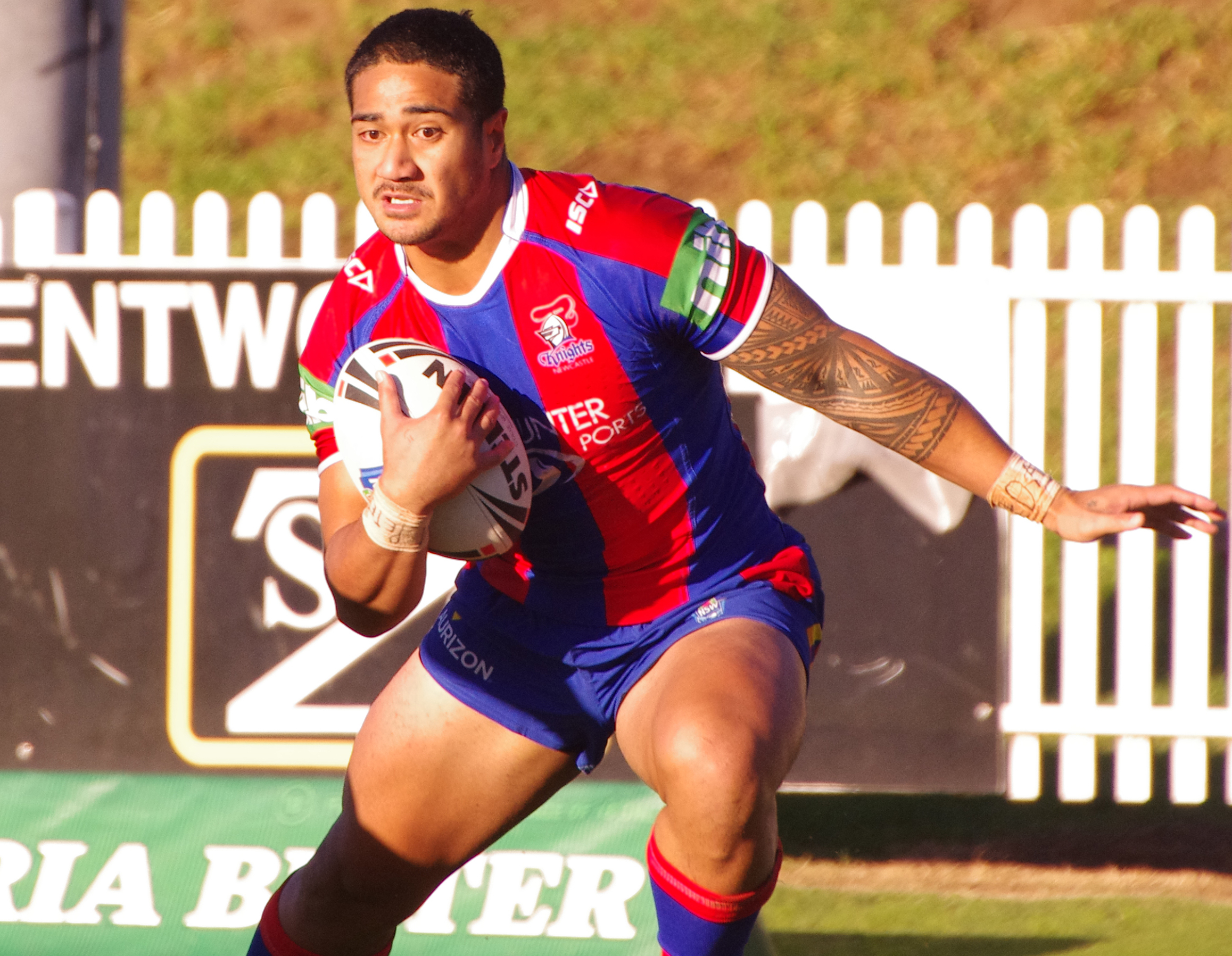

Personal information
- Full name: Chanel Mata'utia-Leifi
- Born: 17 August 1992 (age 34) Liverpool, New South Wales, Australia
- Height: 183 cm (6 ft 0 in)
- Weight: 104 kg (16 st 5 lb)

Playing information
- Position: Wing
Club
Years	Team	Pld	T	G	FG	P
2014–17	Newcastle Knights	13	7	0	0	28
Representative
Years	Team	Pld	T	G	FG	P
2014–15	NSW Residents	2	4	0	0	16
- Source: As of 9 January 2024
- Relatives: Sione Mata'utia (brother); Pat Mata'utia (brother); Peter Mata'utia (brother); Masada Iosefa (cousin)

Chanel Mata'utia-Leifi (/ˌmɑːtəuːˈtiə/ MAH-tə-oo-TEE-ə (born 17 August 1992) is an Australian former professional rugby league footballer. He plays for the Cessnock Goannas in the Newcastle Rugby League. He previously played for the Newcastle Knights in the National Rugby League as a winger.

== Background ==
Mata'utia was born in Liverpool, New South Wales, Australia. He is of Samoan descent. He is the younger brother of former Knights teammate Peter Mata'utia, now of Lakes United in the Newcastle Rugby League, and is the older brother of Knights teammates Pat Mata'utia and Sione Mata'utia.

He played his junior football for the Bankstown Cougars, before moving to Newcastle, New South Wales at a young age and playing for the South Newcastle Lions in the Newcastle Rugby League. He was then signed by the Newcastle Knights.

== Playing career ==
=== Early career ===
From 2010 to 2012, Mata'utia played for the Newcastle Knights' NYC team. On 21 April 2012, he played for the New South Wales Under-20s team against the Queensland Under-20s team and scored a try.

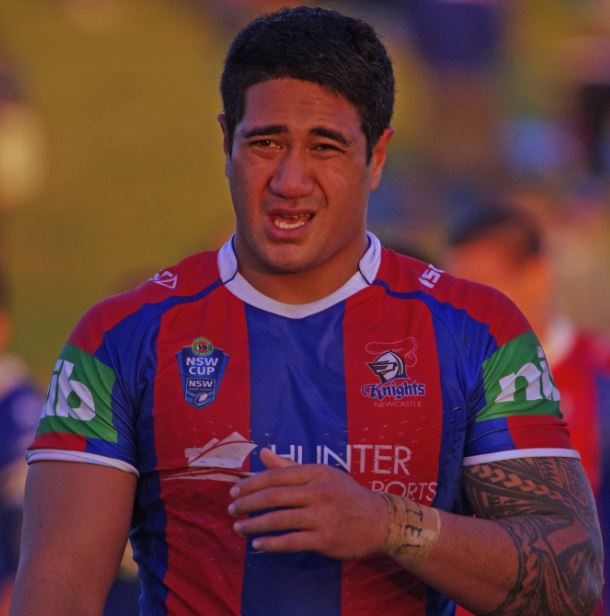
Mata'utia playing for the Knights in 2013

In 2013, he moved on to the Knights' New South Wales Cup team. On 16 October 2013, he re-signed with the Newcastle club on a one-year contract, later extending it by another year in 2014. On 9 July 2014, he played for the New South Wales Residents against the Queensland Residents and scored two tries.

=== 2014 ===
In round 20 of the 2014 NRL season, Mata'utia made his NRL debut for Newcastle against the Sydney Roosters, alongside his brother Sione Mata'utia who also debuted for the club in the same game. This was the first time since round 1 of the 1942 NSWRFL season, that two brothers had debuted in the same game together, Bill and Doug McRitchie debuting for the St. George Dragons on that day. On 9 September 2014, he was named in the Samoa train-on squad for the 2014 Four Nations, but didn't make the final 24-man squad. Late in September 2014, he signed a letter of intent to join the Canterbury-Bankstown Bulldogs on a four-year contract starting in 2016, along with his brothers Sione and Pat. However, the NRL's rules didn't allow the Canterbury club to register the contracts until 30 June 2015, leaving the option of staying at Newcastle open for the Mata'utias.

=== 2015 ===
On 19 March, Mata'utia re-signed with the Newcastle club on a three-year contract, along with his brothers Sione and Pat. In May, he again played for the New South Wales Residents against the Queensland Residents and scored two tries, this time alongside his brother Peter. He managed to play only one NRL game in the 2015 season.

=== 2016 ===
After impressing the new coaching staff in pre-season, Mata'utia was selected to play in the Knights' round 1 side against the Gold Coast Titans, though he was injured during the game. Multiple injuries throughout the year meant the round 1 match would be his only NRL match for the season.

=== 2017 ===
After another injury plagued season, Mata'utia was able to break back into Newcastle's NRL side in round 18 of the 2017 season, going on to play four NRL matches for the year and scoring two tries. On 23 November, it was announced that he would be retiring from the professional level of the game and joining the local Newcastle Rugby League, after being granted a release from the final year of his Newcastle contract. Mata'utia said after being released “The club has been great to me and I will miss everyone, but it is the right time for me to step away from the game at this level”.

=== 2018 ===
In 2018, Mata'utia joined the Cessnock Goannas.
