= South Newcastle Lions =

Australian rugby league club, based in Newcastle, NSW

Club information
- Full name: South Newcastle Lions; Rugby League Football Club
- Colours: Red; White
- Founded: 1910; 115 years ago

Current details
- Ground(s): Townson Oval, Merewether
- Coach: Andrew Ryan
- Competition: Newcastle Rugby League Premierships: 1927 1943 1946 1963 1964 1968 1976 1988 1989 2016 2018 (11)

The South Newcastle Lions is an Australian rugby league football club based in Merewether, New South Wales formed in 1910. They currently play in the Newcastle Rugby League competition. Rivalries are Central Newcastle, Western Suburbs and Lakes United.

== Notable Juniors ==
- Paul Merlo (1977-84 Penrith Panthers, Western Suburbs Magpies & Cronulla Sharks)
- Shane Gray (2013- Gold Coast Titans)
- Chanel Mata'utia (2014- Newcastle Knights)
- Sione Mata'utia (2014- Newcastle Knights)
- Lachlan Fitzgibbon (2015- Newcastle Knights)
- Pat Mata'utia (2016- Newcastle Knights)
- Tevita Pangai Junior (2016- Brisbane Broncos)
- Ben Simmons (2016- Philadelphia 76ers)
