= Masada Iosefa =

Samoan rugby league footballer (1988–2021)

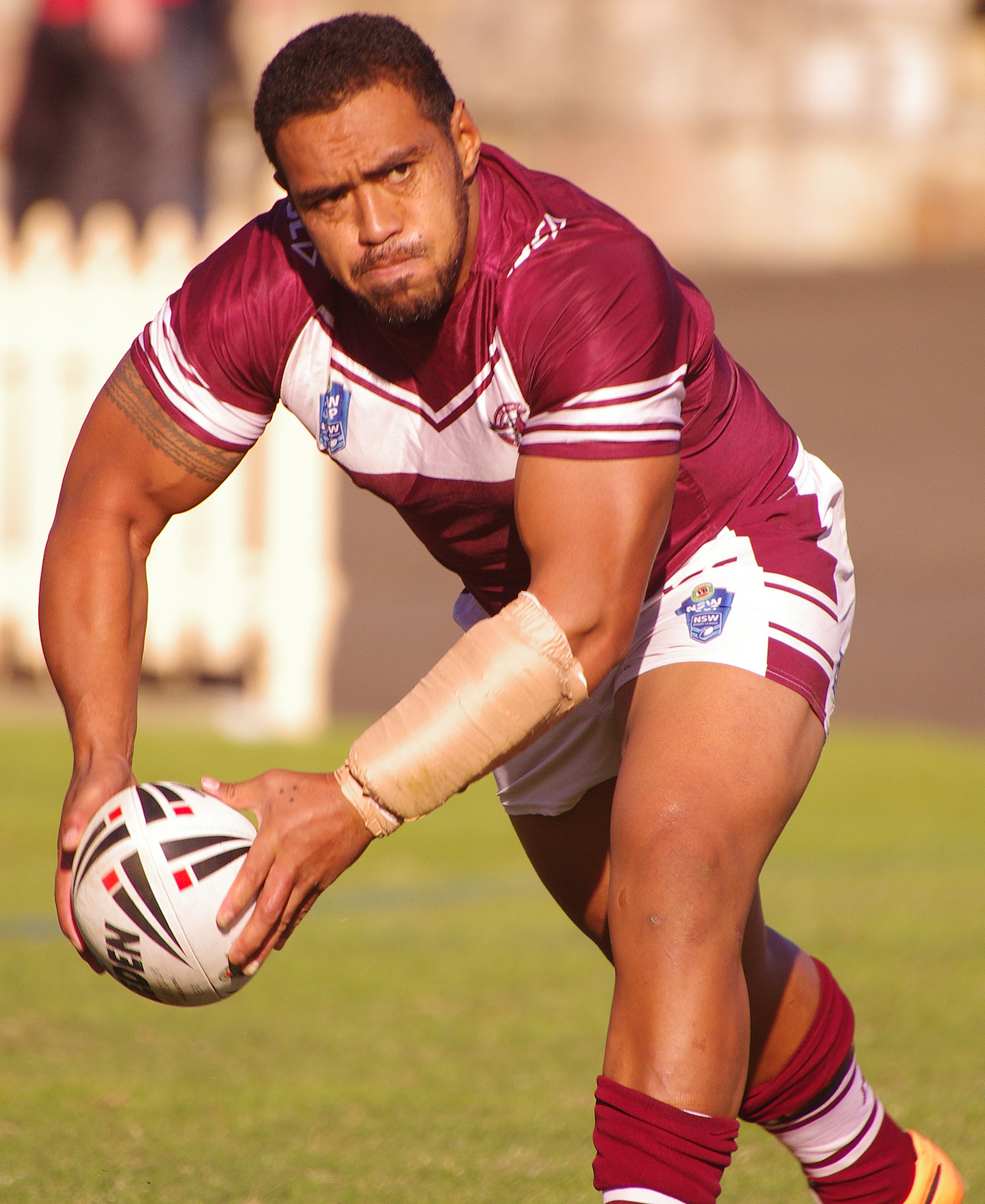
- Iosefa in 2014

Personal information
- Born: 26 January 1988 Motoʻotua, Apia, Western Samoa
- Died: 25 January 2021 (aged 32) Herbert, Northern Territory, Australia

Playing information
- Height: 179 cm (5 ft 10 in)
- Weight: 90 kg (14 st 2 lb)
- Position: Hooker
Club
Years	Team	Pld	T	G	FG	P
2008–11	Penrith Panthers	43	8	0	0	32
2012–13	Wests Tigers	14	3	0	0	12
	Total	57	11	0	0	44
Representative
Years	Team	Pld	T	G	FG	P
2009–13	Samoa	4	1	0	0	4
- Source: As of 30 January 2021
- Education: Patrician Brothers' College, Blacktown
- Relatives: Chanel Mata'utia (cousin); Sione Mata'utia (cousin); Pat Mata'utia (cousin); Peter Mata'utia (cousin)

Masada Iosefa (26 January 1988 – 25 January 2021) was a Samoan professional rugby league footballer who played as a hooker in the 2000s and 2010s for the Penrith Panthers and Wests Tigers in the NRL.

== Early life ==
Born in Motoʻotua, Apia, Western Samoa, Iosefa emigrated to Australia at a young age. A Blacktown City RLFC junior and a student of Patrician Brothers' College, Blacktown, Iosefa has said of his younger years, "I was a little gangster. I guess it doesn't matter now but I grew up with a lot of guys and all they knew was crime. I just blended in with them and got caught up with it a bit. I was just hanging out on the streets. Doing the wrong thing. It is a pretty rough place and the kids just hang out and get into trouble. Not massive trouble but it can go that way. I was caught up with it. I was really close to getting locked away for a while."

Iosefa was a cousin of the four Mata'utia brothers; Chanel Mata'utia, Sione Mata'utia, Pat Mata'utia and Peter Mata'utia.

== Playing career ==
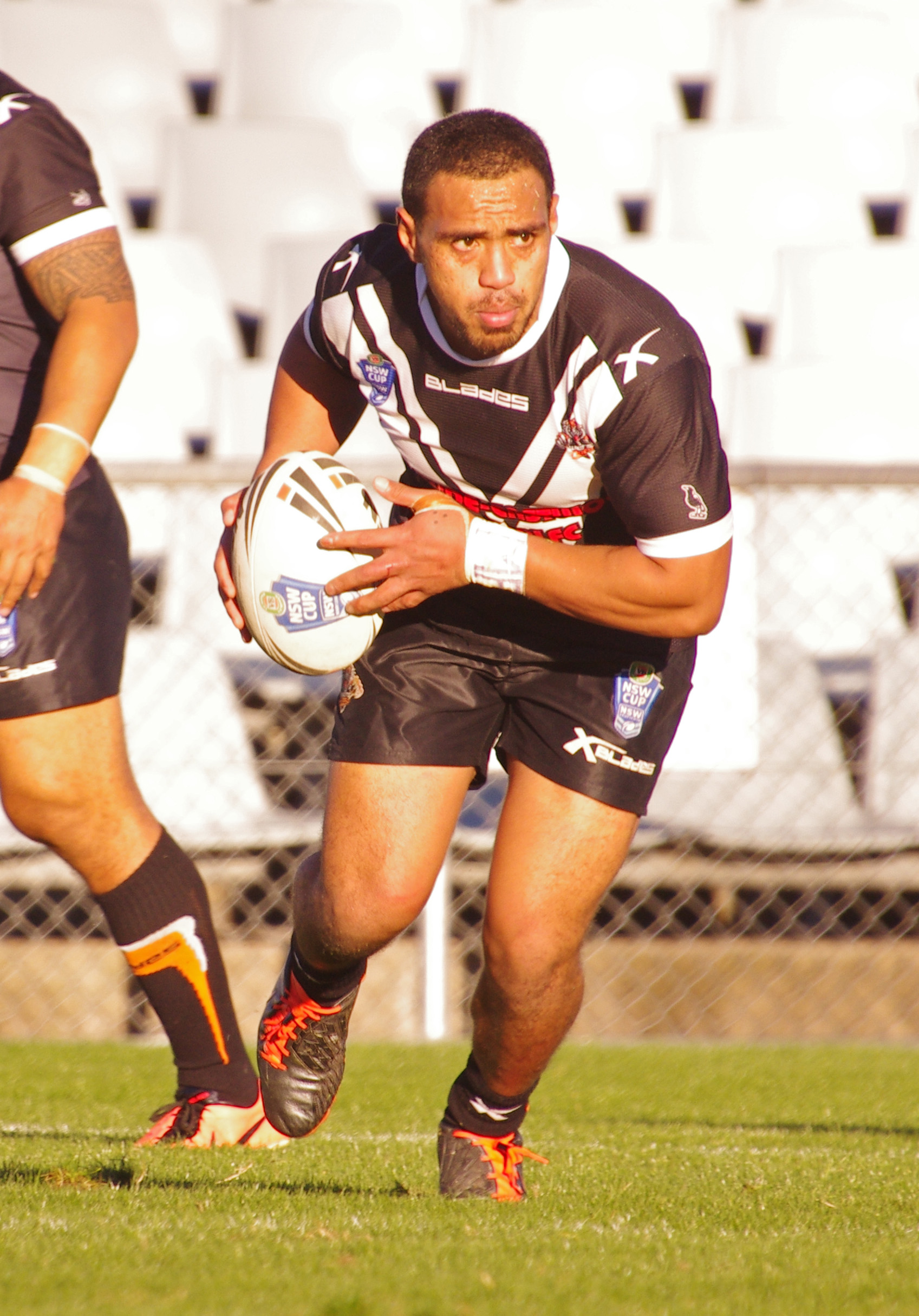
Iosefa in 2013

In 2008, Iosefa made his NRL debut for the Penrith Panthers. He played with the Panthers in the following three years making 43 appearances, almost all from the bench, and scoring eight tries.

In 2012, he joined the Mount Pritchard Mounties in the NSW Cup, a feeder team for the Canberra Raiders. Iosefa was picked up as a mid-season recruit by the Wests Tigers, as back-up for hooker Robbie Farah. Playing hooker or from the bench, he made nine appearances for 2012, the last seven of which were losses. He was also a member of the feeder team Balmain Ryde Eastwood Tigers side that lost the NSW Cup grand final.

Early in 2013, it was reported that Iosefa had been offered a contract with the New Zealand Warriors, with the Wests Tigers unwilling to release him as they needed a backup for hooker Farah.

== Representative career ==
Iosefa was named in both the Samoan and New Zealand training squads for the 2008 World Cup; however, he did not end up making either final side.

In 2009, Iosefa was named as part of the Samoan side for the Pacific Cup.

In April 2013, Iosefa played for Samoa in a 2013 Polynesian Cup against rivals Tonga in Penrith. Later in the year, Samoa selected him to play in Samoa's 2013 Rugby League World Cup campaign. However, just before the tournament kicked off, he was forced out of the side after suffering an injury.

== Post-playing career and death ==
Following his playing career, Iosefa was employed as a youth worker in Rockhampton, Queensland.

On 25 January 2021, a day short of his 33rd birthday, Iosefa died after being involved in a quad bike accident in Herbert, a rural locality of Darwin, Northern Territory.
