= Nathan Green (rugby league) =

Australian rugby league footballer

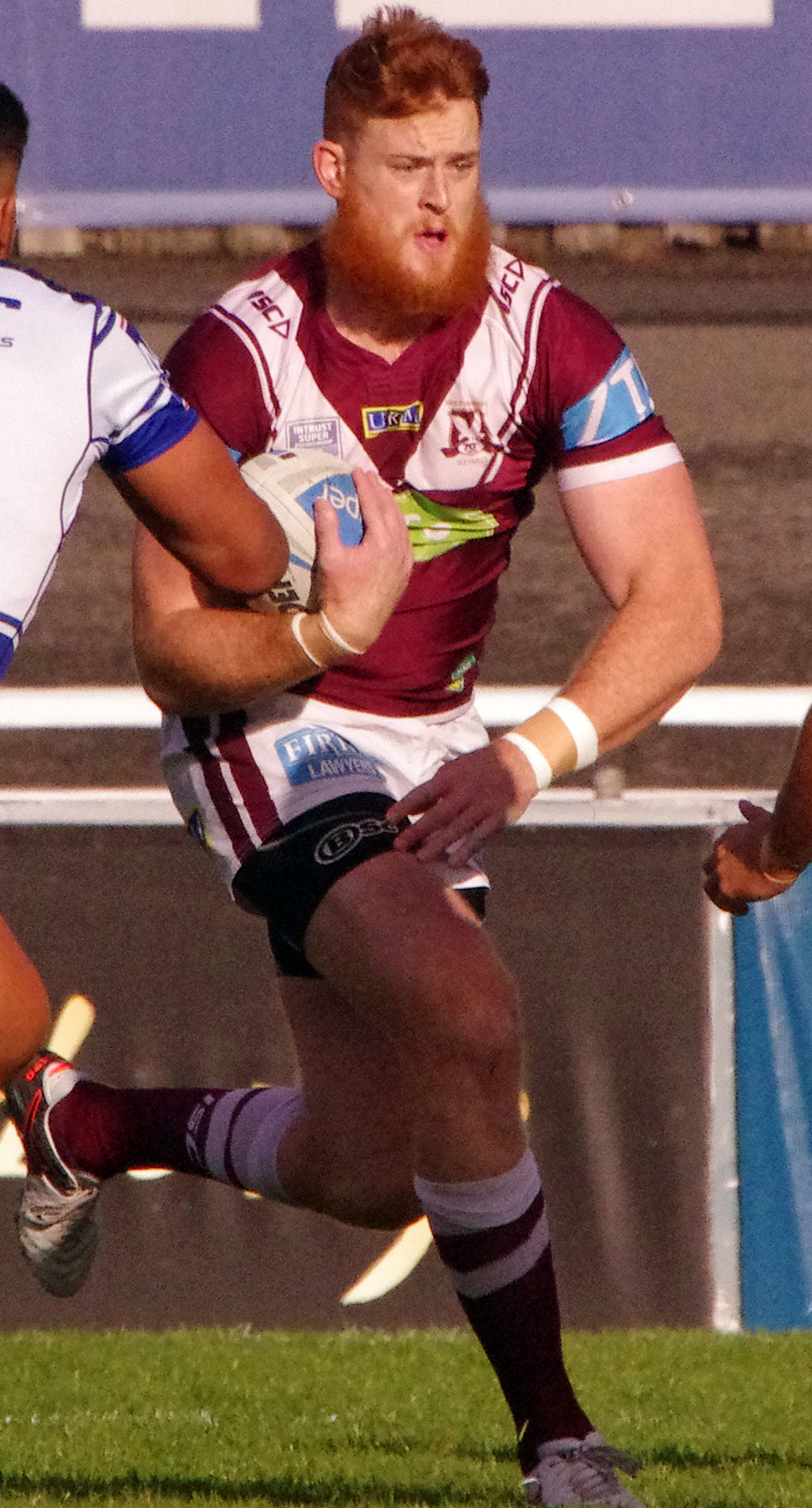

Personal information
- Born: 4 January 1992 (age 34) Sydney, New South Wales, Australia
- Height: 191 cm (6 ft 3 in)
- Weight: 104 kg (16 st 5 lb)

Playing information
- Position: Centre, Second-row, Wing
Club
Years	Team	Pld	T	G	FG	P
2012–15	St. George Illawarra	22	4	0	0	16
2016	Manly Sea Eagles	6	1	0	0	4
	Total	28	5	0	0	20
Representative
Years	Team	Pld	T	G	FG	P
2015	NSW Residents	1	0	0	0	0
- Source: As of 9 January 2024

Nathan Green (born 4 January 1992) is an Australian professional rugby league footballer who last played for the Manly Warringah Sea Eagles in the National Rugby League. He primarily plays as a centre and second-row, but can also fill in on the wing and previously played for the St. George Illawarra Dragons.

== Background ==
Born in Sydney, New South Wales, Green played his junior football for Renown United, before being signed by the St. George Illawarra Dragons.

== Playing career ==
=== Early career ===
From 2010 to 2012, Green played for the St. George Illawarra Dragons' NYC team.

=== 2012 ===
In round 2 of the 2012 NRL season, Green made his NRL debut for St. George Illawarra against the Canterbury-Bankstown Bulldogs. In March, he re-signed with the St. George on a two-year contract. On 21 August, he was named at centre in the 2012 NYC Team of the Year. On 23 September, he was listed as one of the top ten upcoming youngsters in the NRL in Lifestyle Uncut Magazine.

=== 2014 ===
On 27 October, Green re-signed with St. George on a one-year contract.

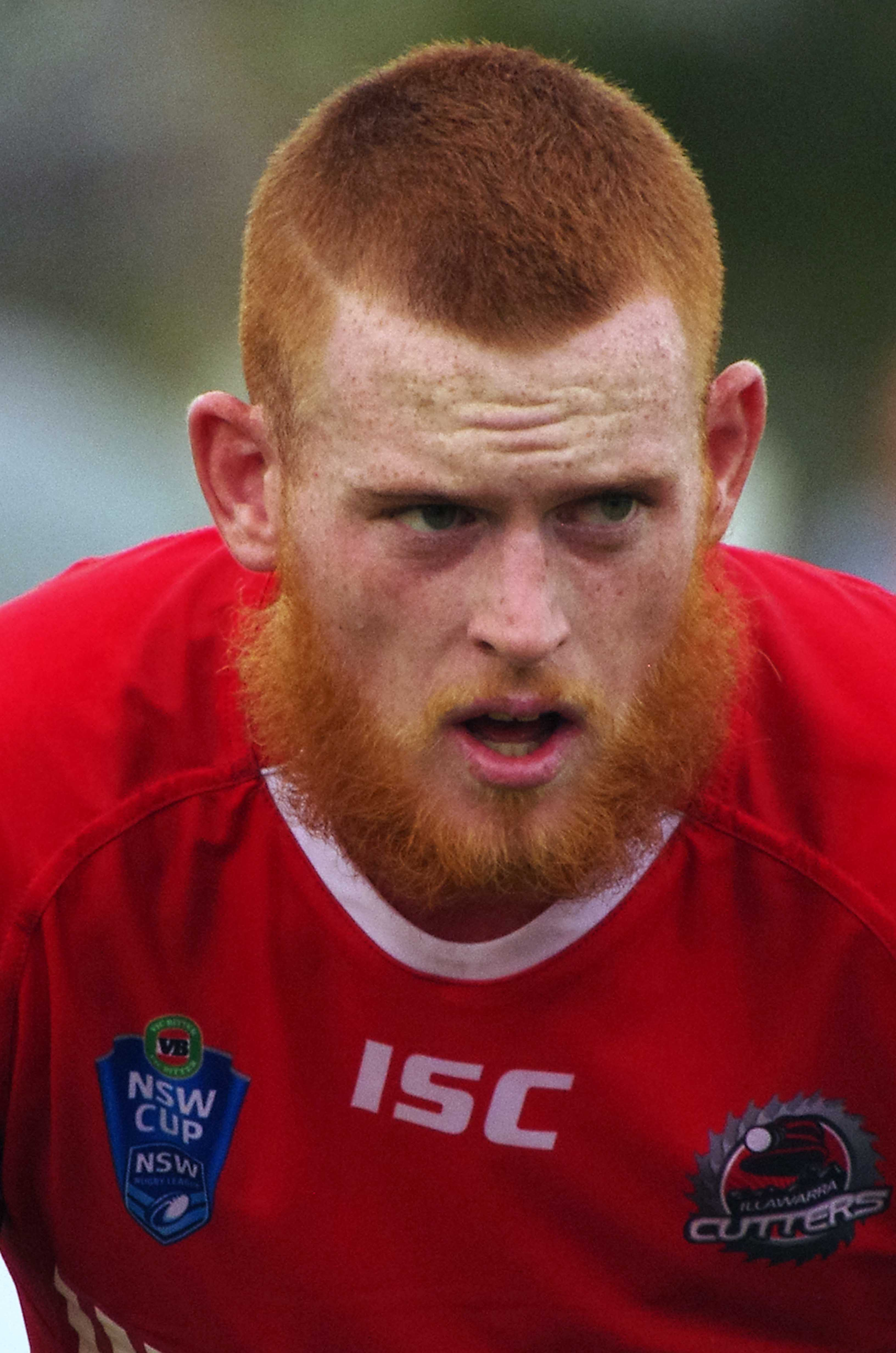
Green playing for the Illawarra Cutters in 2015

=== 2015 ===
On 3 May, Green played for the New South Wales Residents against the Queensland Residents. On 18 August, he signed a one-year contract with the Manly Warringah Sea Eagles starting in 2016.

=== 2016 ===
At Manly, Green played the first two games of the 2016 NRL season. He would spend the next three months in the reserves before some good performances in the second row saw him earn a recall for Manly's round 16 match against the reigning premiers North Queensland. Green played well in a hard fought 30–26 loss in Townsville and retained his spot in the Manly back row for their round 17 match against St. George Illawarra at Brookvale Oval. Green scored his first try for Manly (and the opening try of the game) as the Sea Eagles snapped a 7 game losing streak with a comprehensive 36–6 win.

Green was released by Manly at the conclusion of the 2016 NRL season.
