= Jamie Buhrer =

Australian rugby league footballer

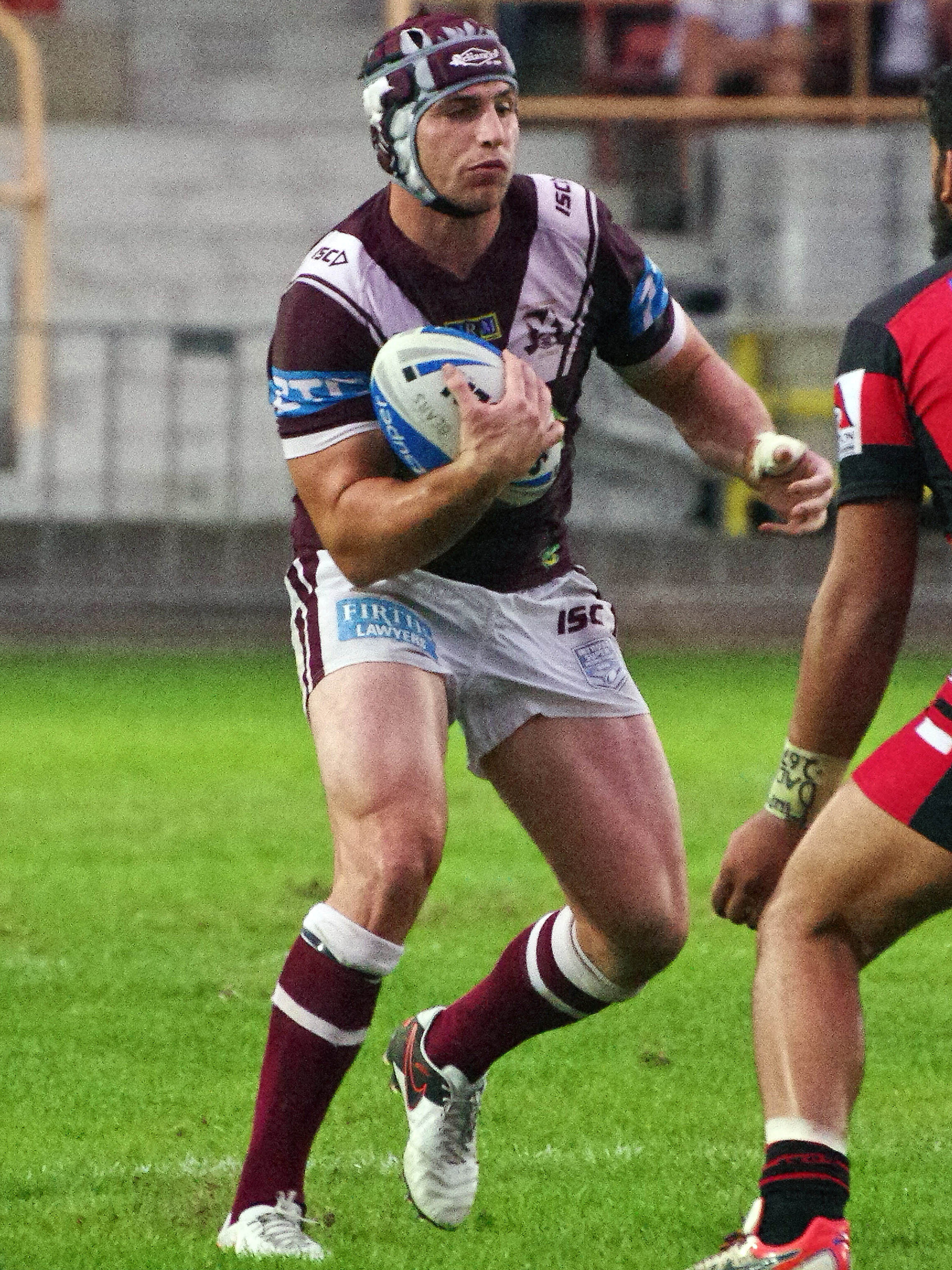

Personal information
- Born: 28 November 1989 (age 36) Westmead, New South Wales, Australia

Playing information
- Height: 181 cm (5 ft 11 in)
- Weight: 94 kg (14 st 11 lb)
- Position: Second-row, Lock, Hooker
Club
Years	Team	Pld	T	G	FG	P
2010–16	Manly Sea Eagles	129	18	0	0	72
2017–19	Newcastle Knights	45	1	0	0	4
	Total	174	19	0	0	76
Representative
Years	Team	Pld	T	G	FG	P
2010	Queensland Residents	1	0	0	0	0
2012–14	NSW City	2	0	0	0	0
2012	New South Wales	1	0	0	0	0

Jamie Buhrer (born 28 November 1989) is an Australian former professional rugby league footballer who played as a second-row, lock and hooker for the Manly Warringah Sea Eagles and the Newcastle Knights in the NRL. He also played for NSW City and New South Wales.

== Background ==
Buhrer was born in Westmead, New South Wales, Australia. He was educated at Patrician Brothers' College, Blacktown in Sydney.

He played his junior rugby league for the Lalor Park Kooka’s and Hills District Bulls. He was then signed by the Manly Warringah Sea Eagles.

== Playing career ==
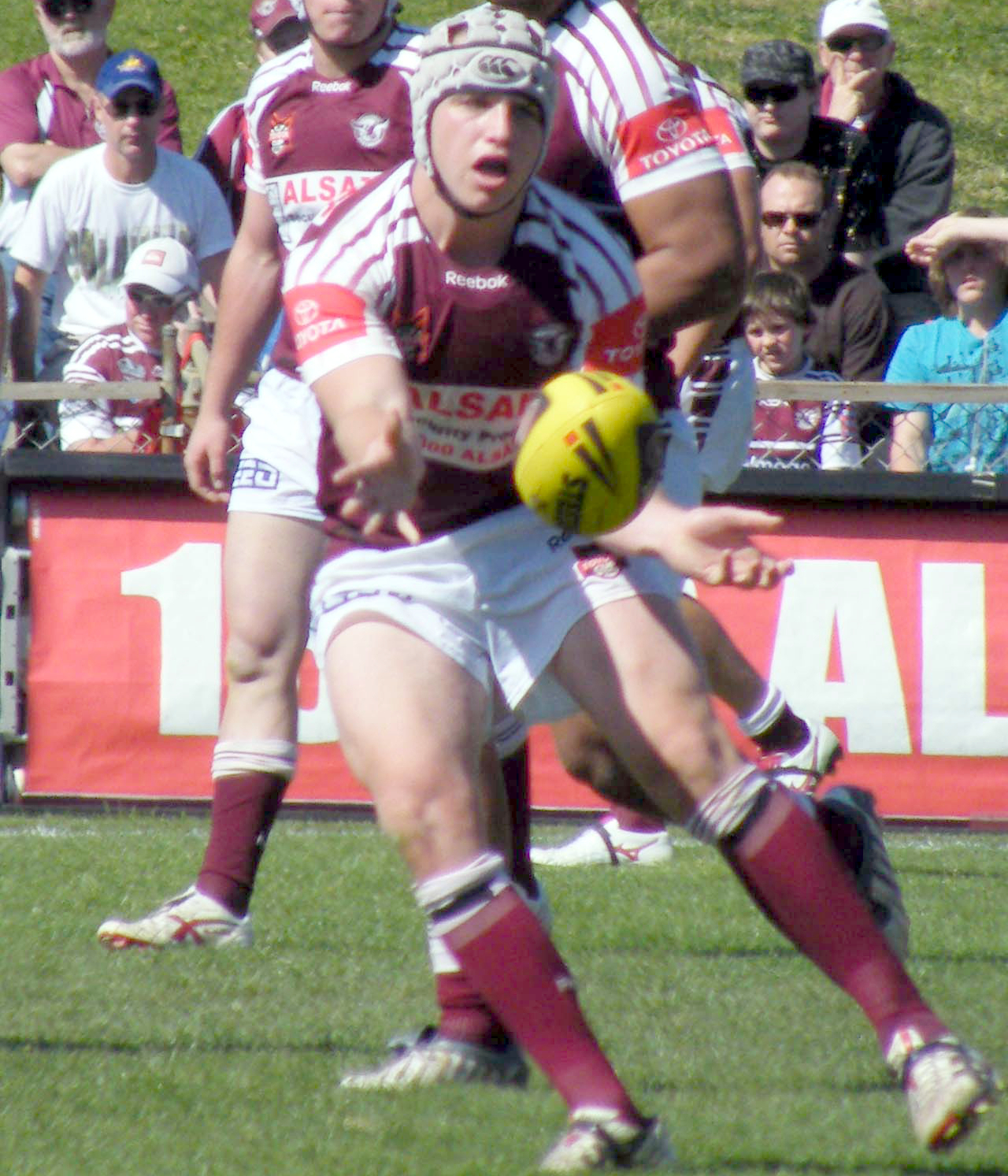
Buhrer playing for the Sea Eagles in 2009

=== Early career ===
In 2008 and 2009, Buhrer played 47 games for the Manly Warringah Sea Eagles' NYC team, scoring 15 tries in total. In September 2009, he was named at lock in the 2009 NYC Team of the Year.

=== 2010 ===
In 2010, Buhrer graduated to the Sea Eagles' Queensland Cup team, Sunshine Coast Sea Eagles. In round 10 of the 2010 NRL season, he made his NRL debut for Manly against the Parramatta Eels.

=== 2011 ===
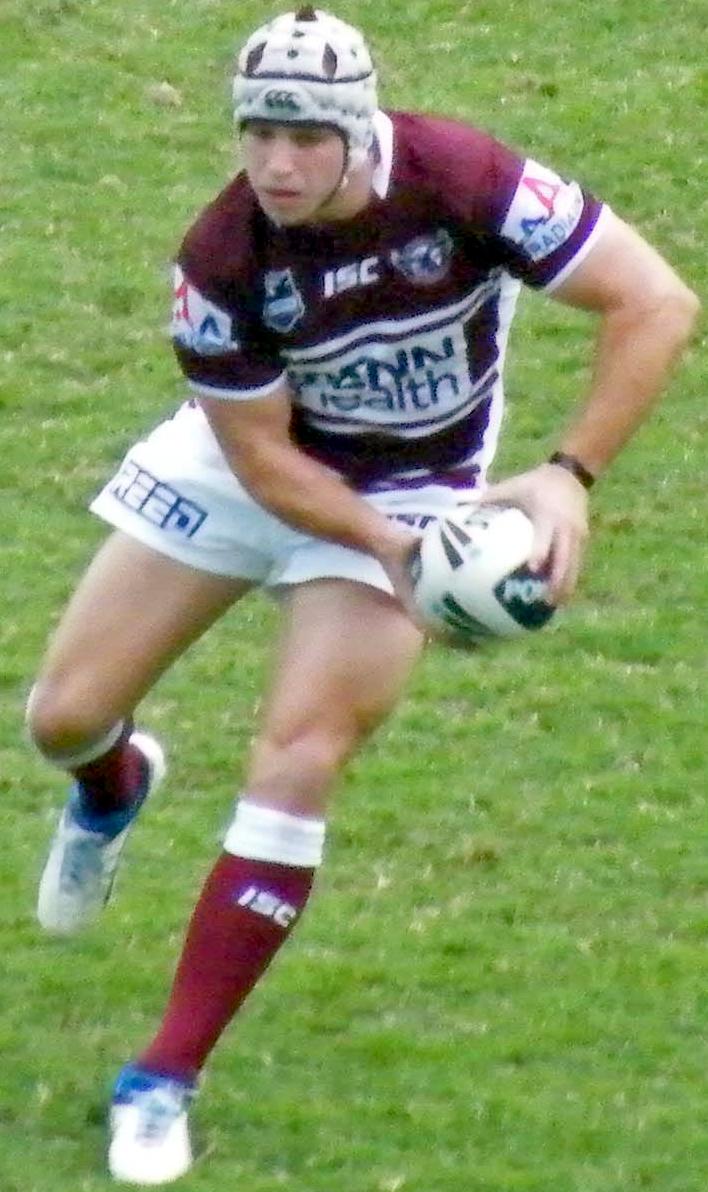
Buhrer playing for the Sea Eagles in 2011

Buhrer scored his first two tries in round 4 of the 2011 season against the South Sydney Rabbitohs, where he was playing at centre. He played off the interchange bench in Manly's 2011 NRL Grand Final win over the New Zealand Warriors. Later on that month, he re-signed with the Manly club on a three-year contract until the end of 2014.

=== 2012 ===
In April, he played for New South Wales City against New South Wales Country in the annual City vs Country Origin match. A month later, he gained selection for the New South Wales State of Origin team to take on Queensland in game one of the series in Melbourne on 23 May 2012. He was subsequently dropped from the side.

=== 2014 ===
In May, Buhrer returned to the New South Wales City side. In September, he tore his anterior cruciate ligament, ruling him out for the rest of the season. Later on that month, he re-signed with the Manly outfit on a three-year contract until the end of 2017.

=== 2016 ===
In October, after playing 128 games for the Manly club, Buhrer was released from the final year of his contract to sign a two-year contract with the Newcastle Knights starting in 2017.

=== 2017 ===
Upon joining the Newcastle club, Buhrer formed part of the leadership group of the playing roster. He made his debut for Newcastle in round 1 of the 2017 season against the New Zealand Warriors. During a training session in April, he suffered a fractured foot and was expected to miss up to eight weeks. He finished the year with 16 matches and one try for the Novocastrians.

=== 2018 ===
In 2018, Buhrer played in 20 matches for the Newcastle side, mostly from the interchange bench.

=== 2019 ===
Due to increasing depth in Newcastle's squad, Buhrer only played nine NRL matches in 2019, before departing at season's end. In November, he announced his retirement from rugby league.

== Post playing ==
Buhrer works as the U16s pathways assistant coach alongside former team mate Matt Orford.

== Statistics ==
Year	Team	Games	Tries	Pts
2010	Manly Warringah Sea Eagles	5		
2011	Manly Warringah Sea Eagles	26	4	16
2012	Manly Warringah Sea Eagles	26	3	12
2013	Manly Warringah Sea Eagles	26	3	12
2014	Manly Warringah Sea Eagles	23	5	20
2015	Manly Warringah Sea Eagles	7		
2016	Manly Warringah Sea Eagles	15	3	12
2017	Newcastle Knights	16	1	4
2018	Newcastle Knights	20		
2019	Newcastle Knights	9		
	Totals	173	19	76

Sporting positions
Preceded by Trent Hodkinson	Newcastle co-captain (with Sione Mata'utia (2017), Mitchell Pearce (2018)); 2017 - 2019	Succeeded by Mitchell Pearce
