= Sione Mata'utia =

Australia & Samoa international rugby league footballer

Personal information
- Full name: Sione Mata'utia-Leifi
- Born: 25 June 1996 (age 30) Liverpool, New South Wales, Australia
- Height: 6 ft 2 in (1.88 m)
- Weight: 16 st 5 lb (104 kg)

Playing information
- Position: Second-row, Centre
Club
| Years | Team | Pld | T | G | FG | P |
|---|---|---|---|---|---|---|
| 2014–20 | Newcastle Knights | 124 | 31 | 0 | 0 | 124 |
| 2021–24 | St Helens | 85 | 17 | 1 | 0 | 70 |
| | Total | 209 | 48 | 1 | 0 | 194 |
Representative
| Years | Team | Pld | T | G | FG | P |
| 2014 | Prime Minister's XIII | 1 | 0 | 0 | 0 | 0 |
| 2014 | Australia | 3 | 1 | 0 | 0 | 4 |
| 2017 | World All Stars | 1 | 0 | 0 | 0 | 0 |
| 2017 | Samoa | 1 | 0 | 0 | 0 | 0 |
- Source: As of 1 November 2024
- Relatives: Chanel Mata'utia (brother); Pat Mata'utia (brother); Peter Mata'utia (brother); Masada Iosefa (cousin)

Sione Mata'utia-Leifi (pronounced ma-ta-oo-tee-a) (born 25 June 1996) is a former professional rugby league footballer who plays as a second-row forward and centre for Lakes United Seagulls in the Newcastle Rugby League. He has represented both Australia and Samoa at international level.

He previously played for the Newcastle Knights in the NRL, as well as the Prime Minister's XIII and World All Stars at representative level. Mata'utia played as a fullback, winger and centre earlier in his career, before moving into the forwards.

== Background ==
Mata'utia was born in Liverpool, New South Wales, Australia. He is of Samoan descent and moved to Newcastle, New South Wales when he was 5 years old.

He played his junior football for the Raymond Terrace Magpies and South Newcastle Lions in the Newcastle Rugby League, before being signed by the Newcastle Knights.

Mata'utia is the younger brother of former Knights players Peter Mata'utia, Chanel Mata'utia and Pat Mata'utia.

== Playing career ==
=== Early career ===
In 2013 and 2014, Mata'utia played for Newcastle's NYC team. On 16 October 2013, he extended his contract with the Knights from the end of 2014 to the end of 2015. On 12 June 2013, he won the Brian Carlson Club-Andrew Johns Medal as Newcastle's best under-17 player. In September and November 2013, he captained the Australian Schoolboys.

=== 2014 ===
On 3 May, Mata'utia played for the New South Wales Under-20s team against the Queensland Under-20s team, playing at centre and scoring a try in New South Wales' 30-8 win at Penrith Stadium.

In round 20 of the 2014 NRL season, he made his NRL debut for Newcastle against the Sydney Roosters at fullback, alongside his brother Chanel Mata'utia who also debuted for the Knights in the same game. This was the first time since Round 1 of the 1942 NSWRFL season, that two brothers had debuted in the same game together, Bill and Doug McRitchie debuting for the St. George Dragons on that day. In round 23 against the New Zealand Warriors at Hunter Stadium, he scored his first NRL career try in a three try effort for Newcastle during their 28-22 win. He finished off his debut year in the NRL having played in seven matches and scoring seven tries for Newcastle in the 2014 season. On 2 September, he was named at centre in the 2014 NYC Team of the Year.

On 8 September 2014, he was named in the Samoa train-on squad for the 2014 Four Nations, later being also named in the Junior Kangaroos train-on squad. On 12 October 2014, he played for the Prime Minister's XIII against Papua New Guinea. On 14 October 2014, he was named in the Australian 2014 Four Nations squad. He became Australia's youngest ever Test player when he played against England, aged 18 years and 129 days, eclipsing Israel Folau's seven-year-old record by 65 days. He played in 3 matches for Australia including playing on the wing and scoring a try in the Kangaroos' 22-18 loss to New Zealand at Westpac Stadium.

Late in September 2014, he signed a letter of intent to join the Canterbury-Bankstown Bulldogs on a four-year contract starting in 2016, along with his brothers Chanel and Pat. However, the NRL's rules didn't allow Canterbury to register the contracts until 30 June 2015, leaving the option of staying at Newcastle open for the Mata'utias.

=== 2015 ===
On 31 January and 1 February, Mata'utia played for Newcastle in the 2015 NRL Auckland Nines. On 19 March, he re-signed with Newcastle on a three-year contract, along with his brothers Chanel and Pat. He finished off the 2015 season having played in 22 matches and scoring 3 tries as the club finished last.

=== 2016 ===
In February, Mata'utia played for Newcastle in the 2016 NRL Auckland Nines. In round 17 against the Canberra Raiders, he switched from the centres to second-row in Newcastle's 21-25 golden-point extra time loss at Canberra Stadium. This would later prove to be a permanent move for the rest of the season. He finished the 2016 season having played in 16 matches and scoring 4 tries.

=== 2017 ===
In round 8 of the 2017 season, Mata'utia captained Newcastle for the first time in their loss to North Queensland. He played a total of 22 games for Newcastle in the 2017 NRL season as the club finished last for a third straight year.

=== 2018 ===
In June, Mata'utia re-signed with Newcastle on a three-year contract until the end of 2021.

=== 2019 ===
Mata'utia played 22 games and scored five tries for Newcastle in the 2019 NRL season as the club finished 11th on the table.

=== 2020 ===
Mata'utia had an interrupted 2020 season due to injury, only playing in 12 matches for Newcastle. After 124 games for the Knights, he was released from the final year of his contract in November to take up a three-year contract with Super League club St Helens R.F.C. starting in 2021.

=== 2021 ===
In round 1 of the 2021 Super League season, he made his debut for St. Helens in their 29-6 victory over Salford.

On 14 July, Mata'utia was suspended for two matches and missed St. Helens Challenge Cup final victory over Castleford.

On 9 October, he played for St. Helens in their 2021 Super League Grand Final victory over Catalans Dragons.

=== 2022 ===
In round 19 of the 2022 Super League season, he was sent off for a professional foul in St Helens 25-0 victory over Huddersfield. On 24 September, he played for St Helens in their 2022 Super League Grand Final victory over Leeds.

=== 2023 ===
On 18 February 2023, he played in St Helens 13-12 upset victory over Penrith in the 2023 World Club Challenge. In April, Mata'utia was knocked out during St Helens loss against arch-rivals Wigan where he remained motionless on the pitch for almost ten minutes and required oxygen. Mata'utia was then ruled out for an indefinite period after being stretchered from the field. In the 2023 Challenge Cup semi-final, Mata'utia was controversially sent to the sin bin during St Helens 12-10 loss against Leigh. He played 20 games for St Helens in the 2023 Super League season as the club finished third on the table. He played in St Helens narrow loss against the Catalans Dragons in the semi-final which stopped them reaching a fifth successive grand final.

=== 2024 ===
On 11 September, Mata'utia announced he would be departing St Helens at the end of the 2024 Super League season. He played 21 games for St Helens in the 2024 Super League season which saw the club finish sixth on the table. Mata'utia played in St Helens golden point extra-time playoff loss against Warrington which was also his last game for the side. On November 1, Mata'utia announced he was retiring from professional rugby league after 11 seasons.

On 6 Nov 2024 it was reported that he, alongside his brother Peter, had signed for Newcastle Rugby League side Lakes United Seagulls

== Statistics ==
| Year | Team | Games | Tries | Pts |
|---|---|---|---|---|
| 2014 | Newcastle Knights | 7 | 7 | 28 |
| 2015 | Newcastle Knights | 22 | 3 | 12 |
| 2016 | Newcastle Knights | 16 | 4 | 16 |
| 2017 | Newcastle Knights | 22 | 3 | 12 |
| 2018 | Newcastle Knights | 23 | 8 | 32 |
| 2019 | Newcastle Knights | 22 | 5 | 20 |
| 2020 | Newcastle Knights | 12 | 1 | 4 |
| 2021 | St Helens | 22 | 5 | 20 |
| 2022 | St Helens | 16 | 5 | 20 |
| 2023 | St Helens | 24 | 2 | 8 |
| 2024 | St Helens | 15 | 4 | 16 |
| | Totals | 203 | 47 | 188 |
