= Alan McRitchie =

Australian rugby league footballer (1942–2024)

Personal information
- Full name: Alan Arthur McRitchie
- Born: 16 October 1942 Kogarah, New South Wales, Australia
- Died: 3 August 2024 (aged 81) Sunshine Coast, Queensland, Australia

Playing information
- Position: Prop
Club
Years	Team	Pld	T	G	FG	P
1964–66	St. George	11	3	0	0	9
1967–69	Cronulla-Sutherland	47	1	0	0	3
	Total	58	4	0	0	12
- Father: Bill McRitchie

Alan McRitchie (16 October 1942 – 3 August 2024) was an Australian rugby league footballer who played in the 1960s. He played for St. George Dragons and Cronulla-Sutherland as a prop. He was an inaugural player for Cronulla and played in the club's first ever game.

== Career ==
=== St. George ===
McRitchie began his first grade career with St George in 1964. McRitchie mainly played reserve grade for the club appearing in 11 first grade appearances over three seasons. Alan McRitchie did not play in any of the first grade grand final teams during the club's 11 year premiership reign although he was a member of the premiership winning Reserve Grade team of 1964.

=== Cronulla Sharks ===
In 1967, McRitchie signed with newly admitted team Cronulla and played in the club's first ever game which was an 11–5 victory over Eastern Suburbs at the Sydney Sports Ground. Cronulla went on to finish last in their inaugural season winning only two further games. McRitchie played another two years with Cronulla and his last season in first grade ended with another wooden spoon in 1969.

Alan McRitchie was the son of the former St. George Dragons player, Bill McRitchie.
