= Doug McRitchie =

Australian RL coach and former Australia international rugby league footballer

Personal information
- Full name: Douglas Allan McRitchie
- Born: 31 July 1923 Marrickville, New South Wales, Australia
- Died: 30 July 1998 (aged 74) Milton, New South Wales, Australia

Playing information
- Position: Centre
Club
Years	Team	Pld	T	G	FG	P
1942–50	St. George	81	25	0	0	75
1951	Queanbeyan
	Total	81	25	0	0	75
Representative
Years	Team	Pld	T	G	FG	P
1948–50	New South Wales	6	0	0	0	0
1948–50	Australia	6	0	0	0	0
1948–50	NSW City	4	0	0	0	0
1951	NSW Country	1	1	0	0	3

Coaching information
Club
Years	Team	Gms	W	D	L	W%
1947	St George	0	0	0	0
- Relatives: Bill McRitchie (brother); Alan McRitchie (nephew)

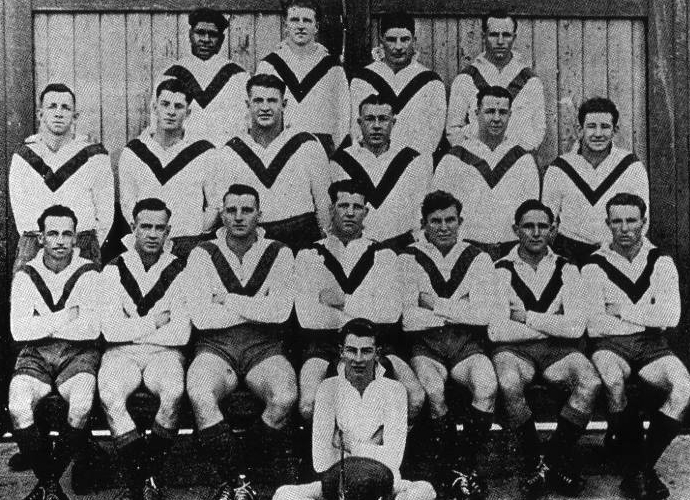
Doug McRitchie (middle row right) in StGeorge's 1946 side

Douglas Allan McRitchie (31 July 1923 – 30 July 1998) was an Australian rugby league footballer who played in the 1940s and 1950s. A New South Wales state and Australia national representative centre, he played his club football in Sydney for the St. George club.

== St. George Dragons career ==
McRitchie was a St. George Dragons local junior who was graded in 1940. He had a long career with the club playing eight seasons in first grade between 1942 and 1950. McRitchie featured in three Grand finals for the club. He was part of two sides who lost deciders - 1942 and 1946 and saw success with the 1949 premiership team.

His career was disrupted by WWII, he enlisted in the AIF and he saw service in New Guinea with the 129 Australian Brigade. After demobilisation, he resumed his playing career at St George, and he captained and co-coached the club with head coach Charlie Lynch in the 1947 NSWRFL season.

== Representative career ==
McRitchie represented New South Wales on six occasions between 1948 and 1950. He was named in the 1948-49 Kangaroo Tour squad and played two Tests against Great Britain, two Tests against France and a further ten tour matches during that series. He is listed on the Australian Players Register as Kangaroo No. 261

=== 1950 Ashes win ===
He played a further two tests in 1950 against Great Britain, the last being of major significance.

Doug McRitchie will always be remembered as the player who clinched the Ashes for Australia in 1950. He made the initial opening and overlap that gave Ron Roberts the try in the Sydney Cricket Ground mud heap on the 22 Jul 1950 Third Test. The Kangaroos won the Test 5–2. McRitchie had hit the English Captain Ernest Ward so hard that the visiting star developed an aversion to tackling that resulted in a split-second hesitancy that gave McRitchie the opening that proved so vital.

== Later career ==
He was signed to captain-coach Queanbeyan, New South Wales in 1951. During the 1951 French rugby league tour of Australia and New Zealand McRitchie played for a Monaro side against the Les Chanticleers.

Doug's brother Bill McRitchie played for St George from 1942 to 1945. Bill was involved in an infamous event in 1945, when he lost a portion of his ear during a match at Henson Park. Newtown stalwart Frank Farrell was accused of the allegation. McRitchie was awarded Life Membership of St. George Dragons in 1997.

== Death ==
McRitchie died at Milton, New South Wales on 30 July 1998 on the eve of his 75th birthday.

== Accolades ==
On 20 July 2022, McRitchie was named in the St. George Dragons District Rugby League Clubs team of the century.
