= Tom Symonds =

Australian professional rugby league player (born 1989)

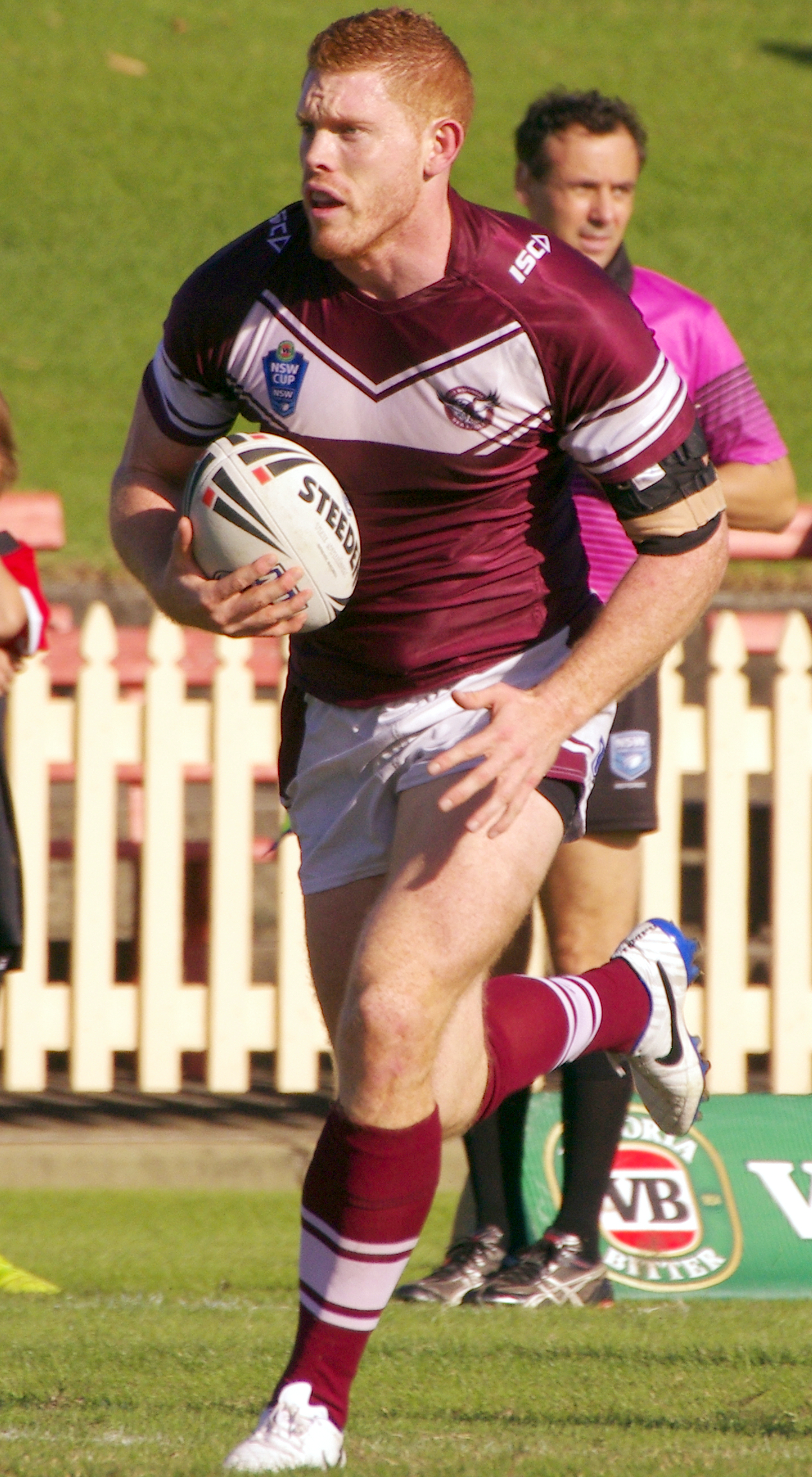

Personal information
- Full name: Thomas Symonds
- Born: 17 February 1989 (age 37) Paddington, New South Wales, Australia
- Height: 189 cm (6 ft 2 in)
- Weight: 102 kg (16 st 1 lb)

Playing information
- Position: Five-eighth, Second-row, Lock
Club
Years	Team	Pld	T	G	FG	P
2009–12	Sydney Roosters	27	5	0	0	20
2013–16	Manly Sea Eagles	65	13	0	0	52
2016–18	Huddersfield Giants	12	5	0	0	20
	Total	104	23	0	0	92
Representative
Years	Team	Pld	T	G	FG	P
2011–13	NSW City	2	0	0	0	0
2015	Prime Minister's XIII	1	0	0	0	0
- Source: As of 16 December 2023

Thomas Symonds (born 17 February 1989) is an Australian professional rugby league player who last played for the Huddersfield Giants in the Super League. He previously played for the Sydney Roosters and Manly-Warringah Sea Eagles.

== Background ==
Symonds was born in Paddington, New South Wales, Australia.

He played his junior rugby league for Bondi United and the Clovelly Crocodiles, whilst attending Marcellin College Randwick before being signed by the Sydney Roosters.

== Playing career ==
=== Sydney Roosters ===
He played for the Roosters' NYC team in 2008 and 2009, scoring 8 tries in 29 games.

In round 11 of the 2009 NRL season, Symonds made his NRL debut for the Roosters against the Penrith Panthers. Symonds made a total of 8 appearances in his debut season at the club as they finished last on the table for the first time since 1966. In the 2010 NRL season, Symonds made 5 appearances but did not feature in the club's finals campaign or the 2010 NRL Grand Final. Symonds departed the Sydney Roosters following conclusion of the 2012 NRL season.

=== Manly-Warringah Sea Eagles ===
On 7 March 2013, Symonds signed a one-year contract with the Manly-Warringah Sea Eagles starting in the same year after being released by the Roosters due to salary cap reasons.

In his first year at Manly, he played for the club in their 2013 NRL Grand Final loss to his former club the Sydney Roosters. The following year, Manly again qualified for the finals but were eliminated by Canterbury-Bankstown. Symonds played with Manly up until the end of the 2016 NRL season before departing the club.

=== Huddersfield Giants ===
In 2016, he signed for the Huddersfield Giants in the Super League.

=== Representative career ===
In 2011, Symonds was selected for the City Origin team to play Country Origin in the annual City vs Country Origin match.
