= Pat Mata'utia =

Samoa international rugby league footballer

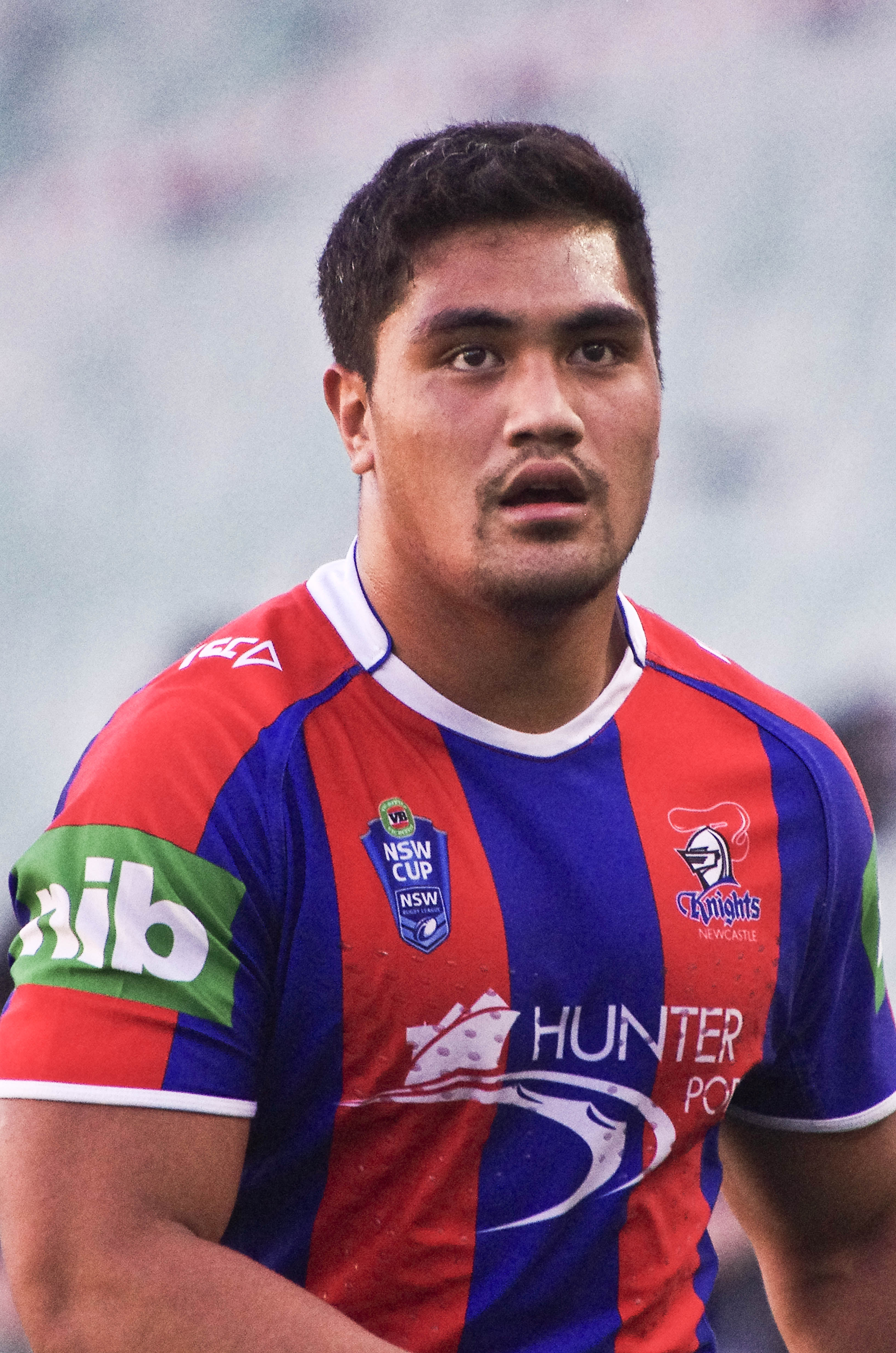
- Mata'utia playing for the Knights in 2014.

Personal information
- Full name: Alapati Mata'utia-Leifi
- Born: 11 September 1993 (age 33) Campsie, New South Wales, Australia
- Height: 184 cm (6 ft 0 in)
- Weight: 103 kg (16 st 3 lb)

Playing information
- Position: Centre, Wing
Club
Years	Team	Pld	T	G	FG	P
2016	Newcastle Knights	14	2	0	0	8
Representative
Years	Team	Pld	T	G	FG	P
2015	Samoa	1	0	0	0	0
- Source: As of 4 March 2018
- Relatives: Chanel Mata'utia (brother); Sione Mata'utia (brother); Peter Mata'utia (brother); Masada Iosefa (cousin)

Pat Mata'utia-Leifi (pronounced ma-ta-oo-tee-a) (born 11 September 1993) is a Samoa international rugby league footballer. His positions are centre and wing. He previously played for the Newcastle Knights in the National Rugby League.

== Background ==
Mata'utia was born in Campsie, New South Wales, Australia. He is of Samoan descent.

He played his junior rugby league for the South Newcastle Lions in the Newcastle Rugby League, before being signed by the Newcastle Knights.

Mata'utia is the younger brother of Knights teammates Peter Mata'utia and Chanel Mata'utia, and older brother of Knights teammate Sione Mata'utia.

== Playing career ==
=== Early career ===
In October 2011, Mata'utia played for the Australian Schoolboys. In 2012 and 2013, he played for the Newcastle Knights' NYC team. On 16 October 2013, he re-signed with the Knights on a 2-year contract. In 2014, he graduated on to the Knights' New South Wales Cup team. Late in September 2014, he signed a letter of intent to join the Canterbury-Bankstown Bulldogs on a four-year contract starting in 2016, along with his brothers Chanel and Sione. However, the NRL's rules didn't allow Canterbury to register the contracts until 30 June 2015, leaving the option of staying at Newcastle open for the Mata'utias.

=== 2015 ===
On 19 March, Mata'utia re-signed with the Newcastle outfit on a three-year contract, along with his brothers Chanel and Sione. On 2 May, he played for Samoa against Tonga in the 2015 Polynesian Cup, making his international debut on the wing in Samoa's 18-16 win at Cbus Super Stadium.

=== 2016 ===
In round 1 of the 2016 NRL season, Mata'utia made his NRL debut for Newcastle against the Gold Coast Titans after the suspension of his brother Sione left open a position at centre. He scored a try on debut in Newcastle's 12-30 loss at Cbus Super Stadium. He finished the year with 14 appearances and two tries.

=== 2018 ===
After not seeing NRL time for the last two seasons, Mata'utia parted ways with the Newcastle club at the end of the 2018 season.
