= Bill McRitchie =

Australian rugby league footballer

Personal information
- Full name: William Arthur McRitchie
- Born: 14 January 1917 Sydney, New South Wales, Australia
- Died: 25 March 1990 (aged 73) Sydney, New South Wales, Australia

Playing information
- Weight: 92 kg (14 st 7 lb)
- Position: Prop
Club
Years	Team	Pld	T	G	FG	P
1942–45	St. George	40	1	0	0	3
- Relatives: Alan McRitchie (son); Doug McRitchie (brother)

William Arthur McRitchie (1917–1990) was an Australian rugby league footballer who played in the 1940s.

== Career ==
Bill McRitchie was a St. George prop forward who played four seasons with the club between 1942–1945. He was introduced to rugby league by the then Saints captain/coach Neville Smith in 1940.

A Brighton-Le-Sands junior, McRitchie and his younger brother Doug McRitchie, both debuted for St George in 1942 although, Doug was a tall winger and Bill was a massive prop. The brothers won the A Grade premiership with Brighton club in 1941 and they were both graded in 1942. They both played together in the 1942 Grand Final.

Bill McRitchie's career was cut short in 1945 after his ear lobe was torn off in a scrum during a match against Newtown on 28 July 1945 at Henson Park.

After spending the next 22 weeks in hospital, Bill McRitchie was forced to retire from rugby league for good. Bill McRitchie was also a first grade cricketer in the St. George district for over 20 years.

His son, Alan, also played with St. George in the 1960s.

== Death ==
McRitchie died on 25 March 1990, aged 73. He was cremated at Woronora Cemetery 3 days later.
