= Peter Mata'utia =

Samoa international rugby league footballer

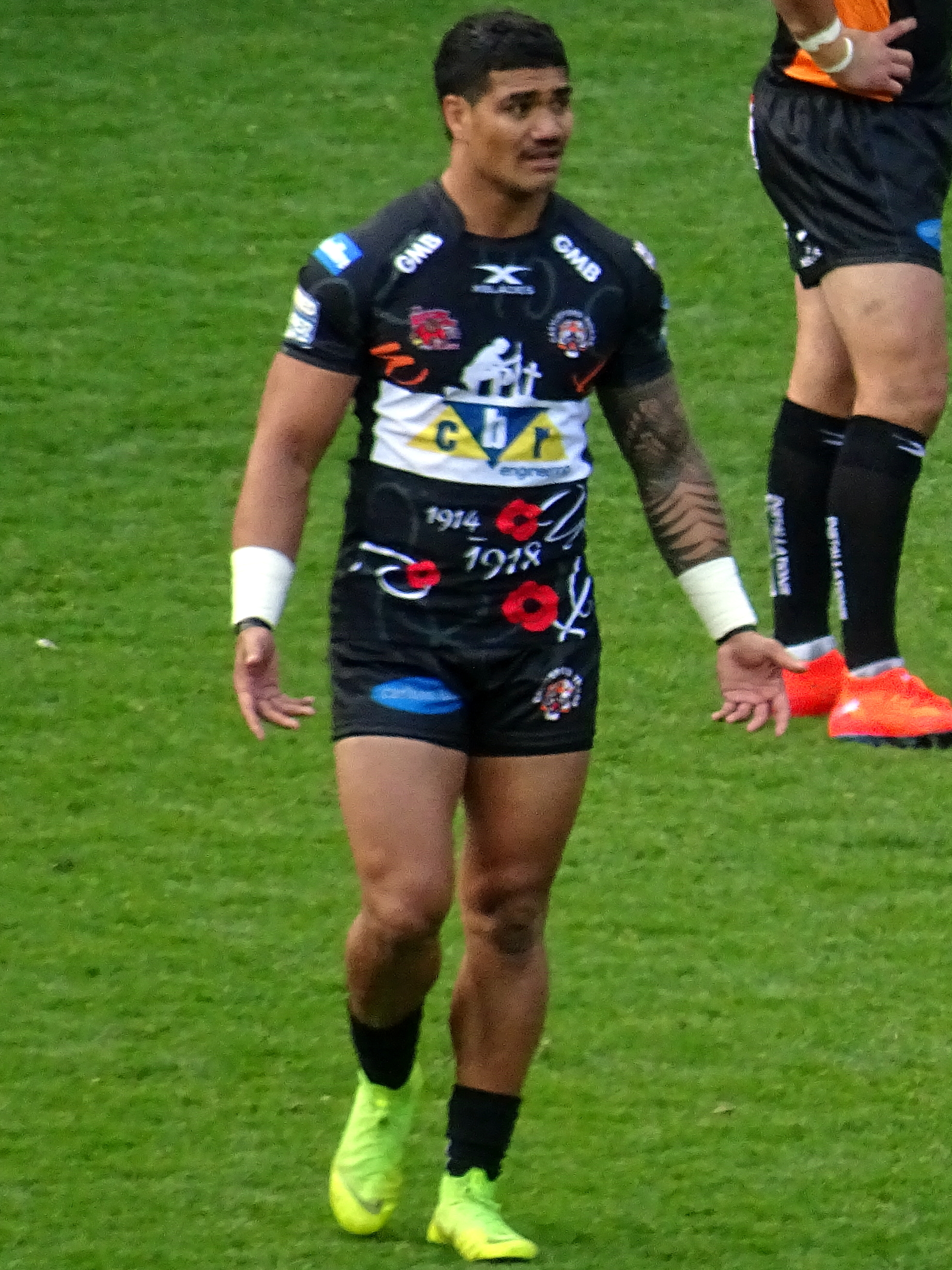

Personal information
- Full name: Peter Mata'utia-Leifi
- Born: 12 November 1990 (age 36) Bankstown, New South Wales, Australia
- Height: 5 ft 11 in (1.80 m)
- Weight: 14 st 11 lb (94 kg)

Playing information
- Position: Centre, Fullback, Wing, Stand-off
Club
Years	Team	Pld	T	G	FG	P
2011–13	Newcastle Knights	6	2	0	0	8
2014–16	St. George Illawarra	35	11	0	0	44
2016–17	Newcastle Knights	35	10	0	0	40
2018	Leigh Centurions	4	0	0	0	0
2018(loan)	→ Castleford Tigers	8	1	0	0	4
2019–21	Castleford Tigers	61	12	60	1	169
2022–23	Warrington Wolves	55	6	8	0	40
	Total	204	42	68	1	305
Representative
Years	Team	Pld	T	G	FG	P
2009–17	Samoa	4	0	2	0	4
2015	NSW Residents	1	0	0	0	0
2021–22	Combined Nations All Stars	2	1	0	0	4
- Source: As of 9 January 2024
- Relatives: Chanel Mata'utia (brother); Pat Mata'utia (brother); Sione Mata'utia (brother); Masada Iosefa (cousin)

Peter Mata'utia-Leifi (Samoan pronunciation: [mɑːtæutiæ]; born 12 November 1990), also known by the nickname of "Peanut", is a Samoa international rugby league footballer who plays as a centre, fullback or stand-off for the Lakes United Seagulls in the Newcastle Rugby League in the Newcastle Rugby League.

He has previously played for the Newcastle Knights, in two spells, and the St. George Illawarra Dragons in the NRL. Mata'utia has also played for the Leigh Centurions in the Championship and on loan from Leigh at Castleford in the Super League. Mata'utia is signed to Warrington Wolves for the 2022 Superleague season.

== Background ==
Mata'utia was born in Bankstown, New South Wales, Australia and is of Samoan descent.

He played his junior rugby league for the Bankstown Cougars. He then moved to Newcastle, New South Wales, and played for Raymond Terrace, before being signed by the Newcastle Knights.

Mata'utia is the older brother of Knights teammates Chanel Mata'utia, Pat Mata'utia and Sione Mata'utia.

== Playing career ==
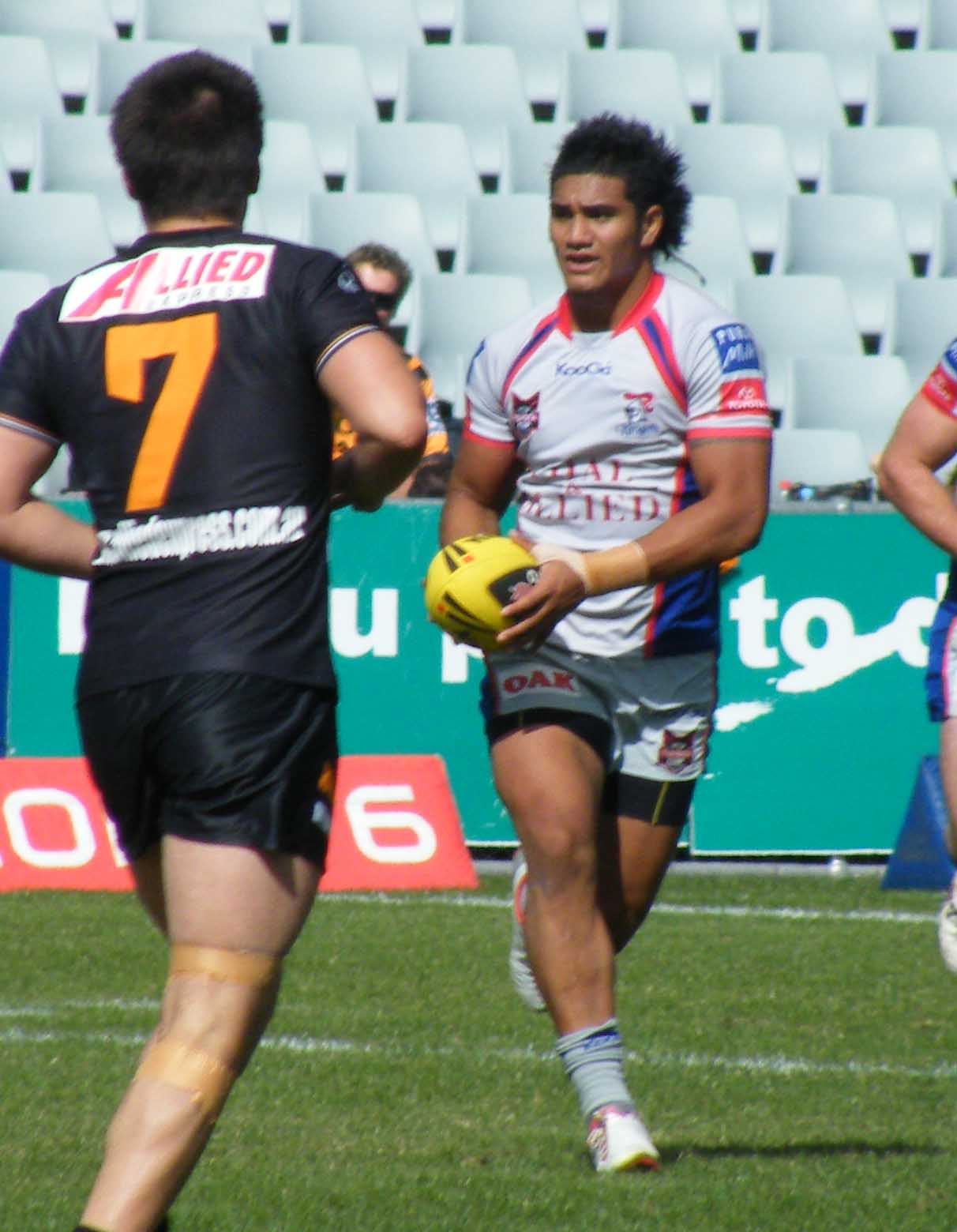
Mata'utia playing for the Knights in 2009.

=== Early career ===
From 2008 to 2010, Mata'utia played for the Newcastle Knights' NYC team, scoring over 300 points in 44 games. In August 2008, he played for the Australian Schoolboys. On 17 October 2009, he played for Samoa against the Cook Islands in the 2009 Pacific Cup.

=== 2011 ===
In 2011, Mata'utia graduated to the Knights' New South Wales Cup team, Central Coast Centurions. In Round 11 of the 2011 NRL season, he made his NRL debut for the Knights against the Sydney Roosters, scoring a try on debut. On 17 June, he re-signed with the Knights on a 2-year contract, turning down offers from three rival teams. He finished his debut season having played in five games and scoring two tries.

=== 2012 ===
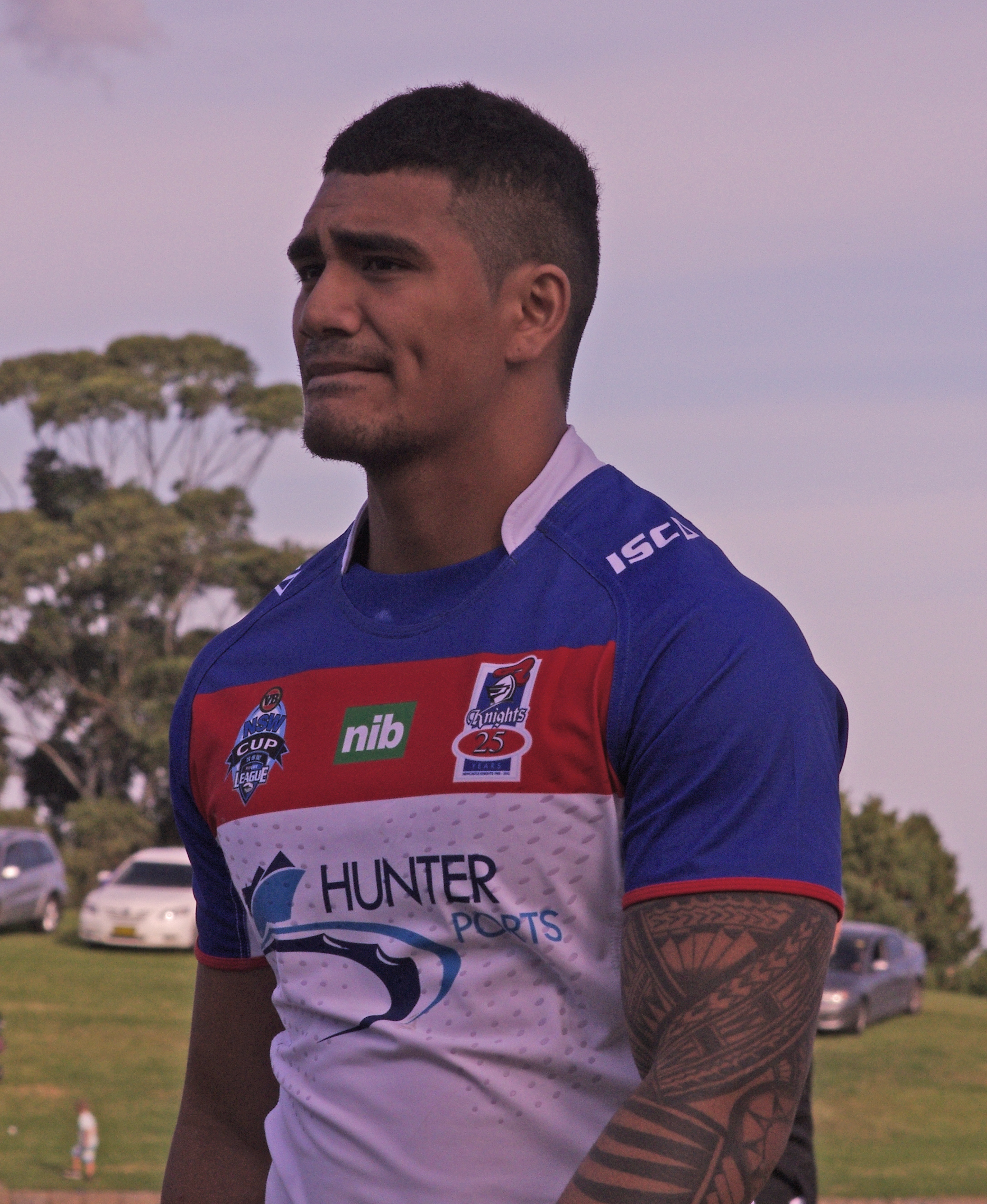
Mata'utia playing for the Knights in 2012

In July, Mata'utia was admitted to hospital after suffering a crushed larynx in a New South Wales Cup game for the Knights. He received an emergency tracheostomy after he was unable to breathe during a scan on his neck. He was ruled out for the rest of the season, after only playing one NRL game for the Knights that year.

=== 2013 ===
On 17 July, Mata'utia played for the New South Wales Residents against the Queensland Residents. On 23 August, he signed a 2-year contract with the St. George Illawarra Dragons starting in 2014, after failing to break into the Knights' first-grade team in 2013. On 22 September, he was named at centre in the 2013 New South Wales Cup Team of the Year.

=== 2014 ===
On 3 May, Mata'utia returned to the Samoan side against Fiji in the 2014 Pacific Rugby League International. In Round 10 of the 2014 NRL season, he made his club debut for the Dragons against the Parramatta Eels. On 8 September, he was named in the Samoan train-on squad for the 2014 Four Nations, later making the final 24-man squad for Samoa, however he was unable to compete in the tournament due to passport issues.

=== 2015 ===
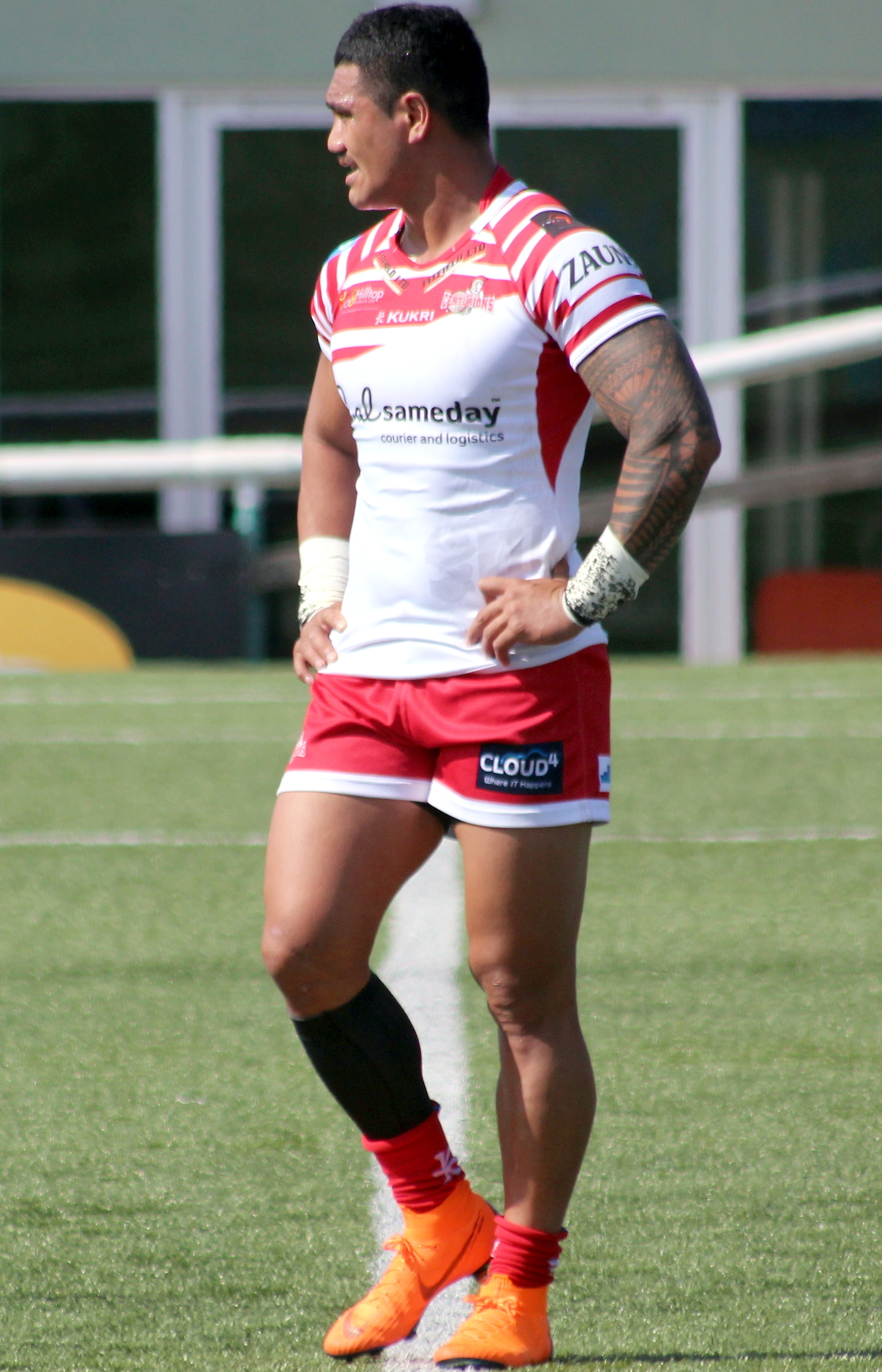
Mata'utia playing for the Leigh Centurions in 2018

On 3 May, Mata'utia again played for the New South Wales Residents against the Queensland Residents, this time alongside his brother Chanel. On 24 June, he re-signed with the Dragons on a 2-year contract.

=== 2016 ===
On 20 April, Mata'utia returned to the Newcastle Knights effective immediately on a contract until the end of 2017, after being released from his Dragons contract.

=== 2017 ===
Mata'utia played in every match for the Knights in the 2017 season, only missing 6 games since returning to the Knights midway through the 2016 season. In October, he rejected a 1-year extension offer from the Knights and instead signed a 3-year contract with the Leigh Centurions in the English Kingstone Press Championship.

=== 2018 ===
Mata'utia started the 2018 season with the Leigh Centurions, however, was allowed to leave the club due to the club's inability to make the top 4 of the Championship and owner Derek Beaumont admitting that he would not be able to financially support the club beyond the current season. Mata'utia signed a loan deal with Castleford Tigers until the end of 2018, which would lead to a 3-year deal from 2019 until the end of 2021. He made his debut in the Tigers' 52–24 victory over Widnes Vikings.

=== 2019 ===
Mata'utia was assigned the number 1 jersey. In January 2019 he revealed tha this five-year-old son had suffered a cancer scare.

=== 2021 ===
On 25 June 2021 he played for the Combined Nations All Stars, and scored a try, in their 26–24 victory over England, staged at the Halliwell Jones Stadium, Warrington, as part of England's 2021 Rugby League World Cup preparation.

On 17 July, he played for Castleford in their 2021 Challenge Cup Final loss against St. Helens.

=== 2023 ===
He played 26 games for Warrington in the 2023 Super League season as Warrington finished sixth on the table and qualified for the playoffs. He played in the clubs elimination playoff loss against St Helens. On 7 October 2023, he announced his retirement from professional rugby league.
