= 2026 NSWRL Major Competitions =

The New South Wales Rugby League (NSWRL) will administer several major competitions during the 2026 season. These will include tiered open-age competitions across metropolitan and regional New South Wales, as well as a suite of age-based pathway competitions for both male and female players. Along with the Queensland Rugby League, these competitions form a key part of the pathway into the National Rugby League (NRL) and NRLW.

== Tier 1 Open Age Competitions ==
=== New South Wales Cup ===
2026 Knock-On Effect NSW Cup
- Duration: 5 March – 26/27 September 2026
- Teams: 14
- Broadcast partners: Streaming; BarTV Sports (All Matches)

The New South Wales Cup (named the Knock-On Effect NSW Cup for sponsorship reasons) is the premier men's rugby league competition in New South Wales and the primary open-age reserve-grade competition for NRL clubs based in the state. Nationally, along with the Queensland Cup, it is recognised as a tier-two competition sitting immediately below the NRL and providing a direct pathway for players, coaches and match officials.

==== Teams ====
===== Club changes =====
- The 2026 Knock-On Effect NSW Cup will see the Melbourne Storm enter the competition, fielding their own reserves side after ending their previous NRL affiliation arrangements.
- Canterbury-Bankstown Bulldogs – Jason Taylor has been appointed as head coach for the 2026 season, replacing Michael Potter.
- Manly Warringah Sea Eagles – former NRL halfback Brett Kimmorley takes over as head coach for 2026, replacing Guy Williams.
- North Sydney Bears – Leon Latulipe replaces Tony Barnes as head coach for the 2026 season, with the club also entering a new affiliation agreement with the Perth Bears.
- Western Suburbs Magpies – Tyrone McCarthy has been appointed as head coach for 2026, replacing Aaron Payne.

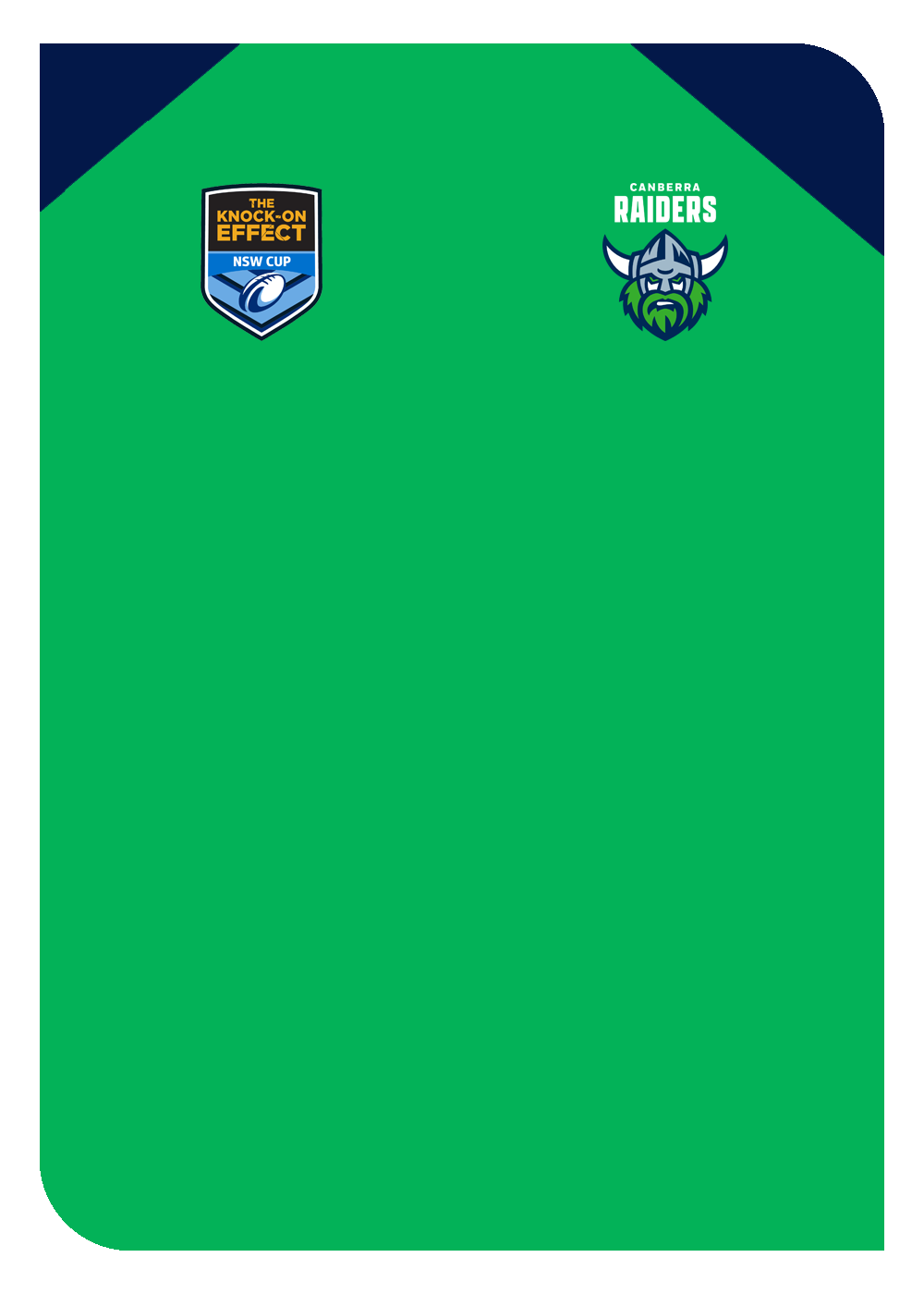
Canberra; Raiders Ground: GIO Stadium City/Suburb: Canberra (Bruce) Coach: Chris Lewis Affiliate: Canberra Raiders

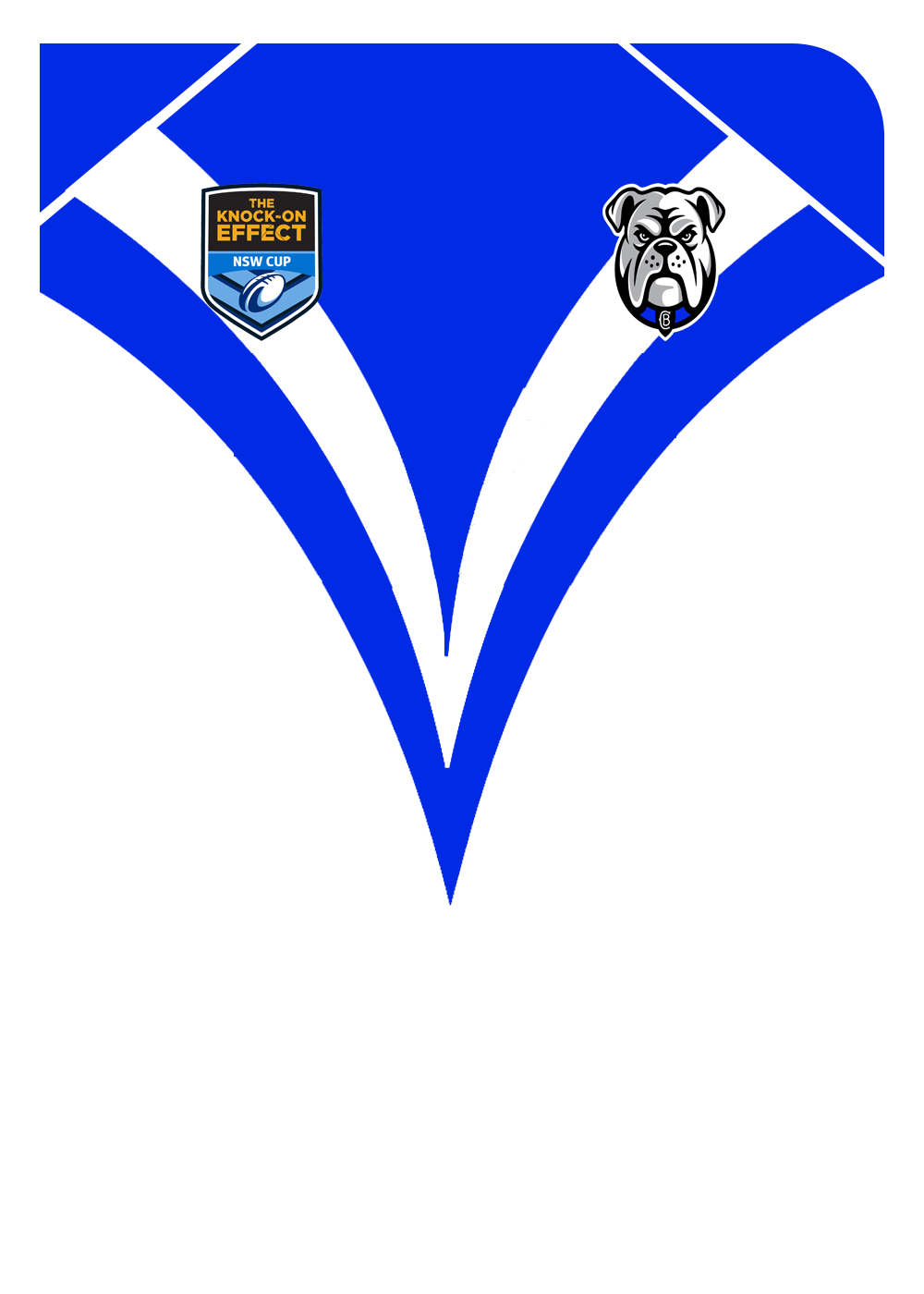
Canterbury-Bankstown; Bulldogs Ground: Belmore Sports Ground City/Suburb: Sydney (Belmore) Coach: Jason Taylor Affiliate: Canterbury-Bankstown Bulldogs

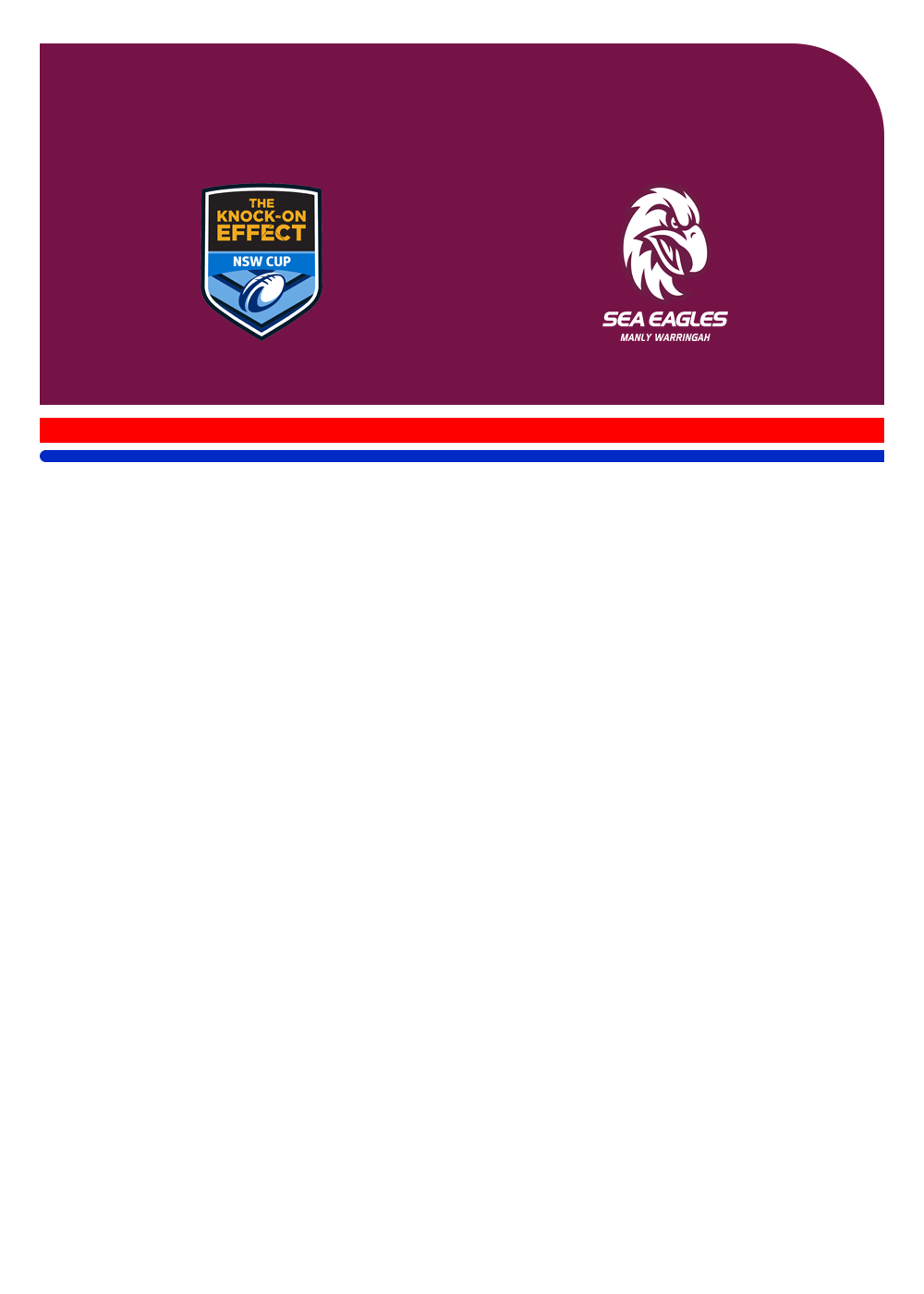
Manly Warringah; Sea Eagles Ground: 4 Pines Park City/Suburb: Sydney (Brookvale) Coach: Brett Kimmorley Affiliate: Manly Warringah Sea Eagles

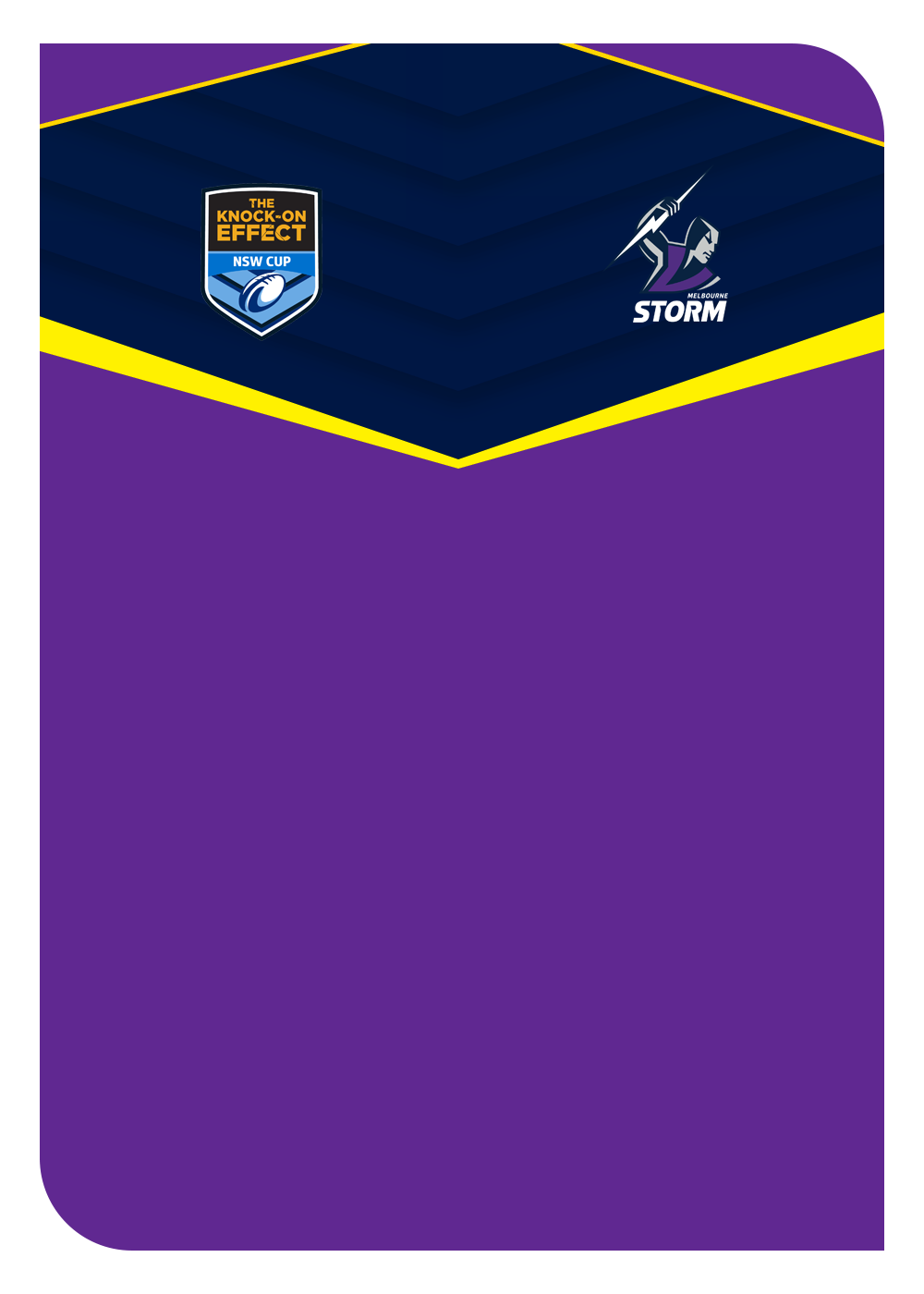
Melbourne; Storm Ground: AAMI Park City/Suburb: Melbourne (East Melbourne) Coach: Mark Russell Affiliate: Melbourne Storm

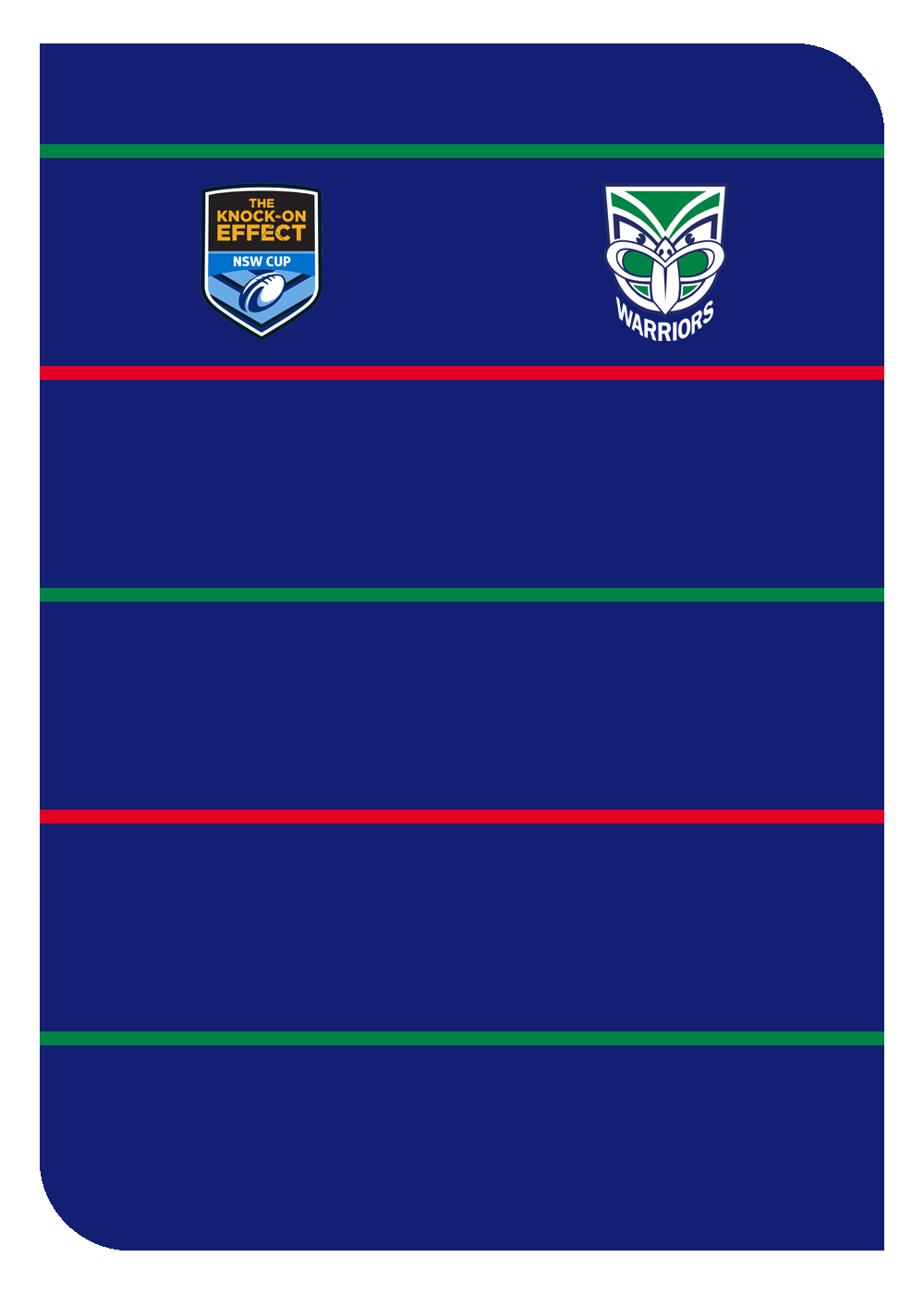
New Zealand; Warriors Ground: Go Media Stadium City/Suburb: Auckland (Penrose) Coach: David Tangata-Toa Affiliate: New Zealand Warriors

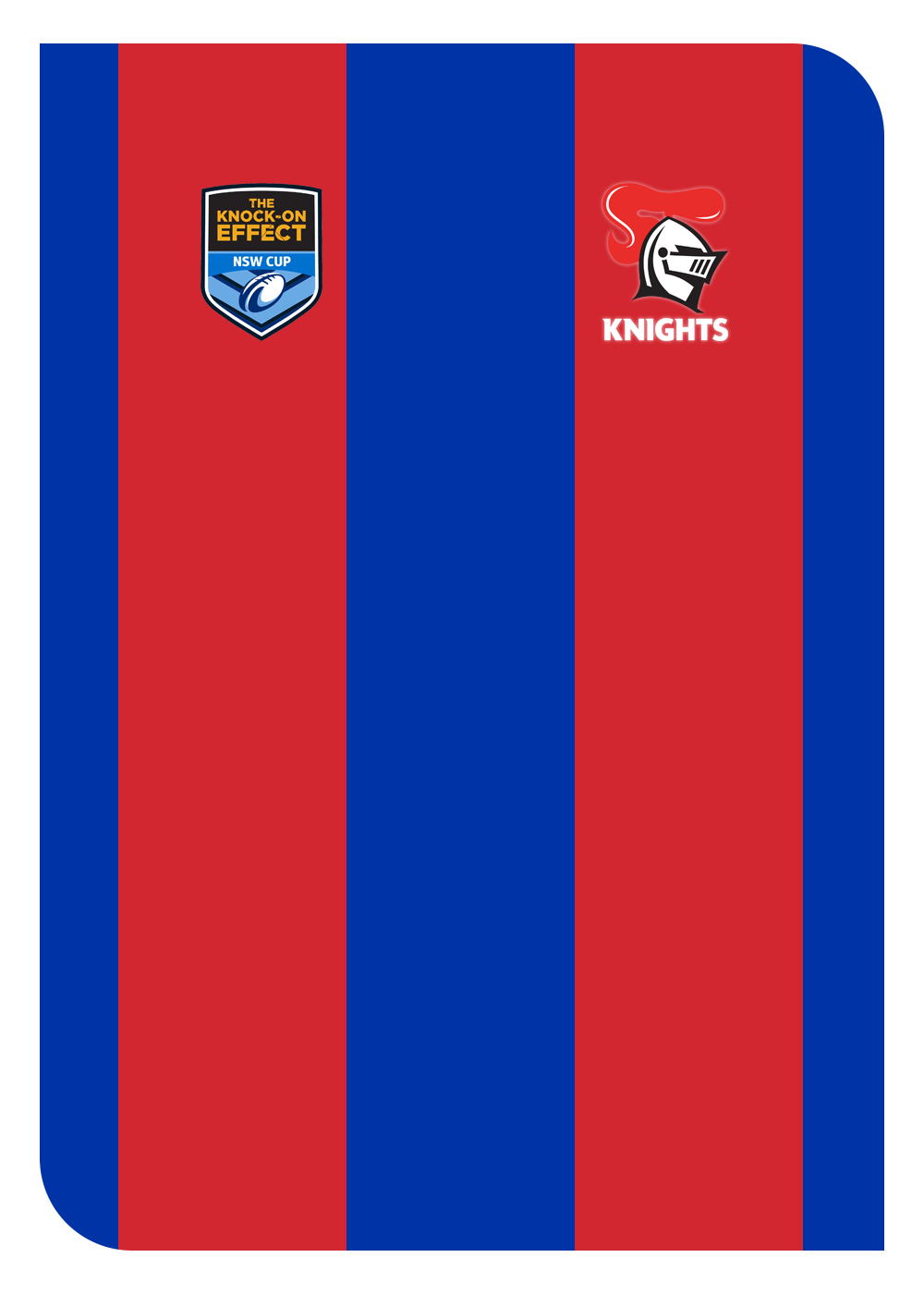
Newcastle; Knights Ground: McDonald Jones Stadium City/Suburb: Newcastle (Broadmeadow) Coach: Michael Dobson Affiliate: Newcastle Knights

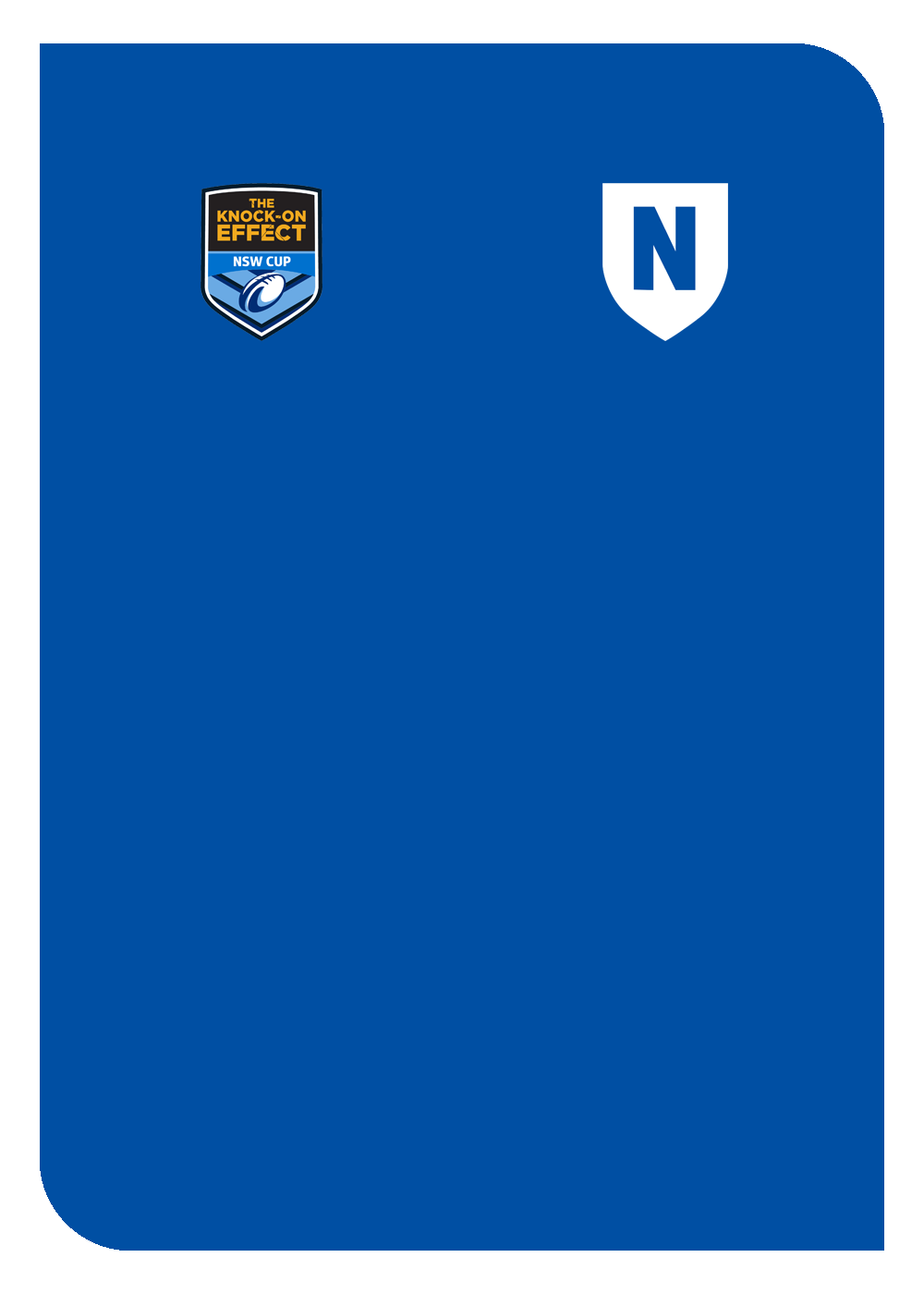
Newtown; Jets Ground: Henson Park City/Suburb: Sydney (Marrickville) Coach: George Ndaira Affiliate: Cronulla-Sutherland Sharks

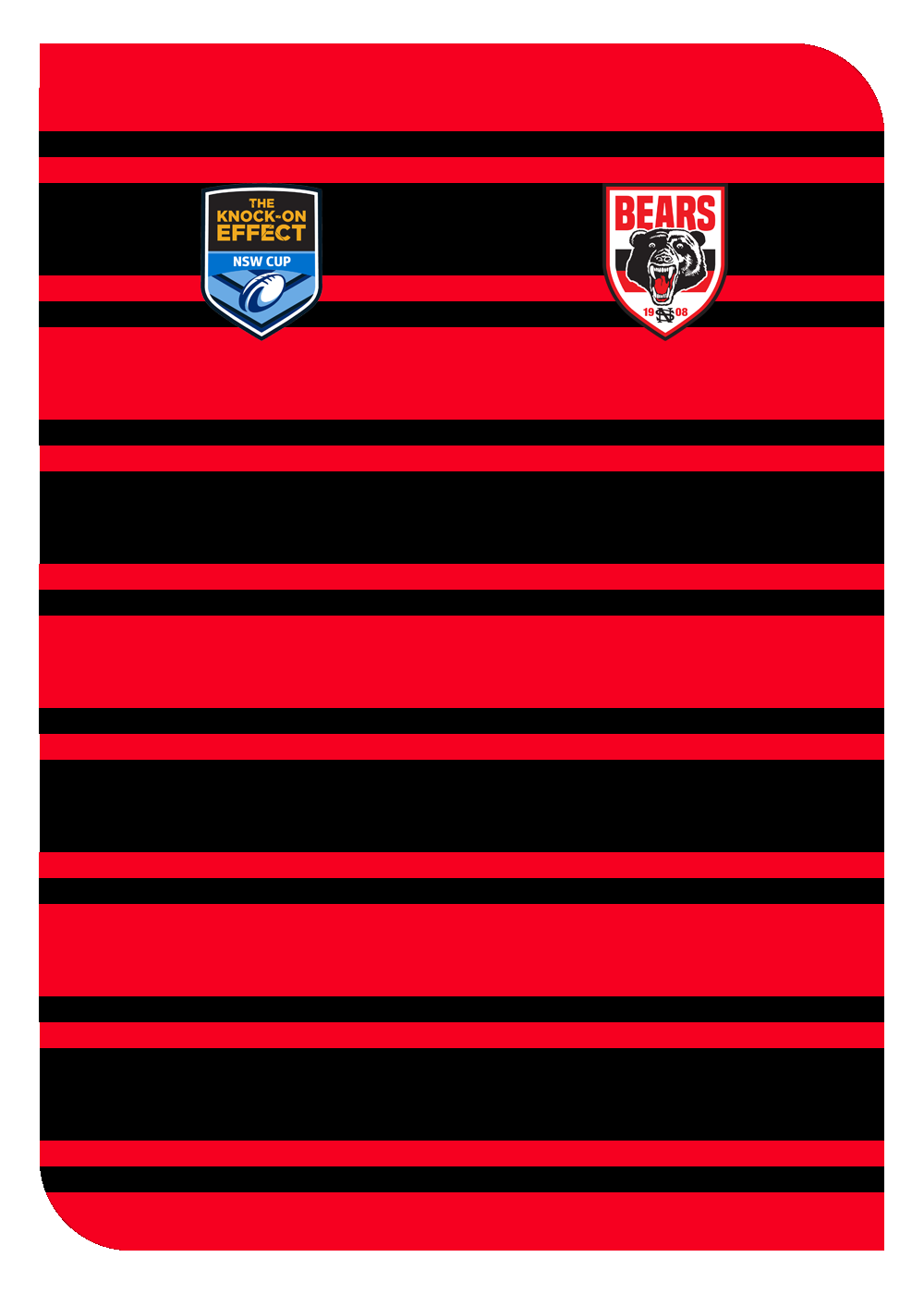
North Sydney; Bears Ground: North Sydney Oval City/Suburb: Sydney (North Sydney) Coach: Leon Latulipe Affiliate: Perth Bears

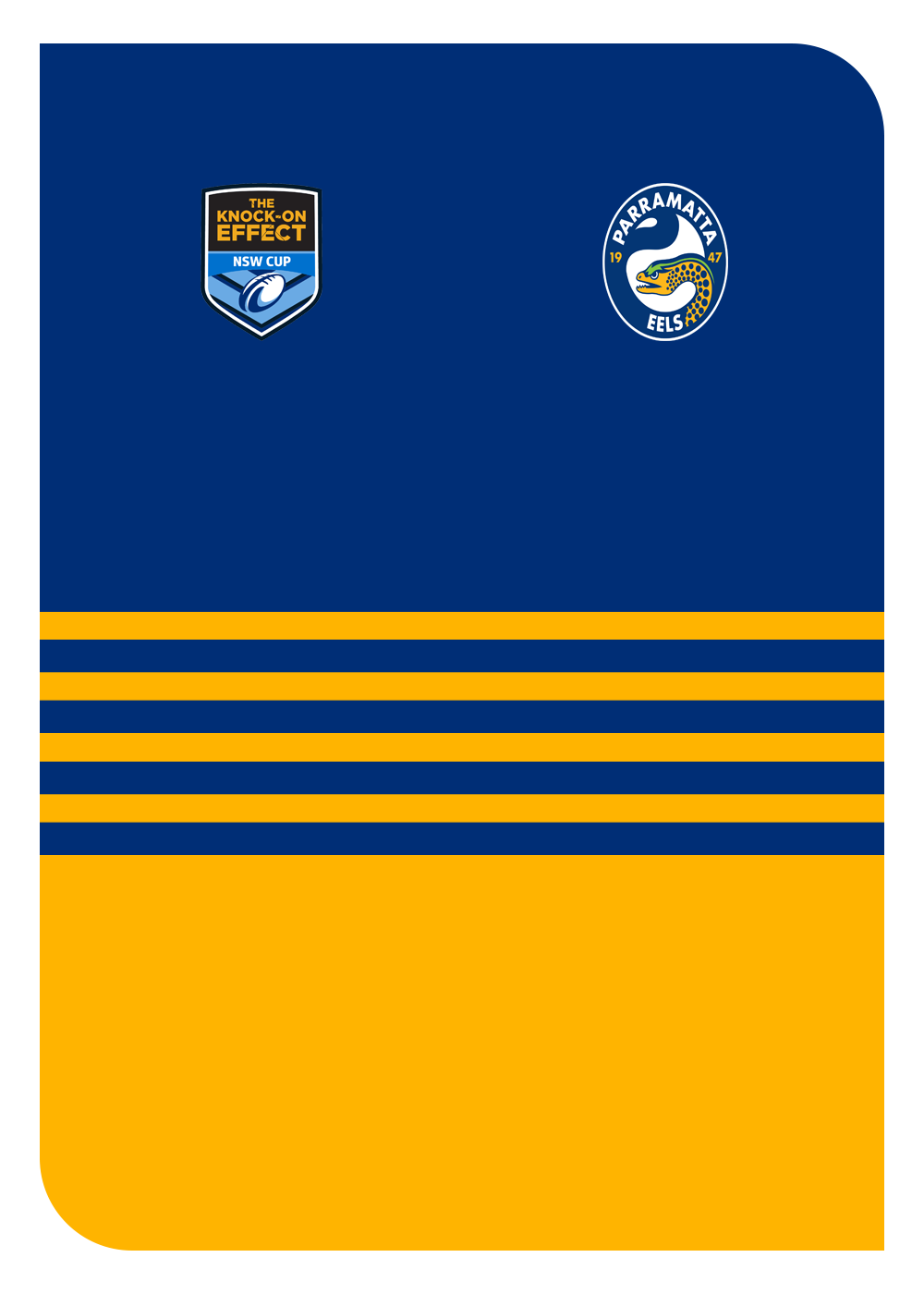
Parramatta; Eels Ground: CommBank Stadium City/Suburb: Sydney (Parramatta) Coach: Nathan Cayless Affiliate: Parramatta Eels

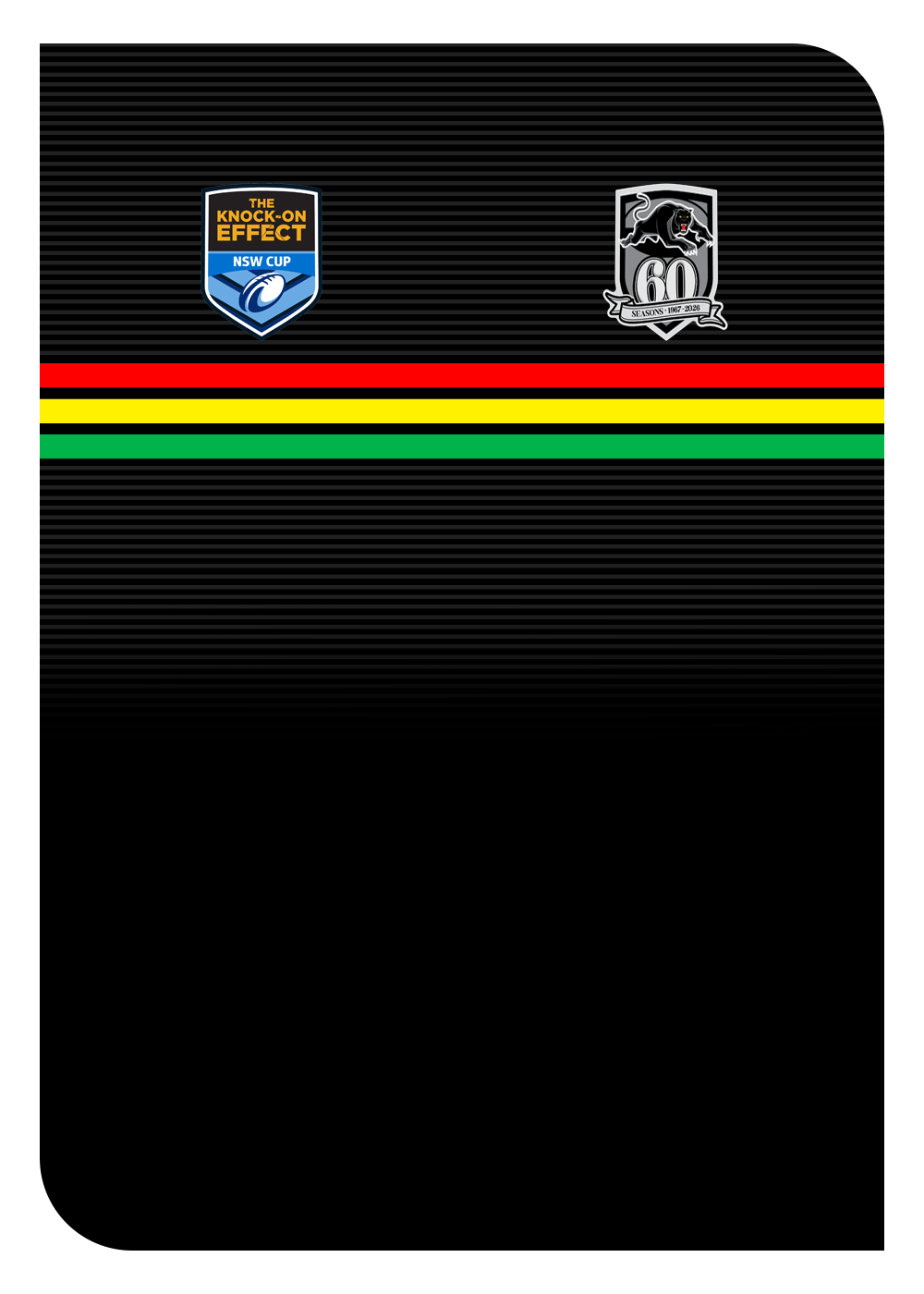
Penrith; Panthers Ground: Parker Street Reserve City/Suburb: Sydney (Penrith) Coach: Ben Harden Affiliate: Penrith Panthers

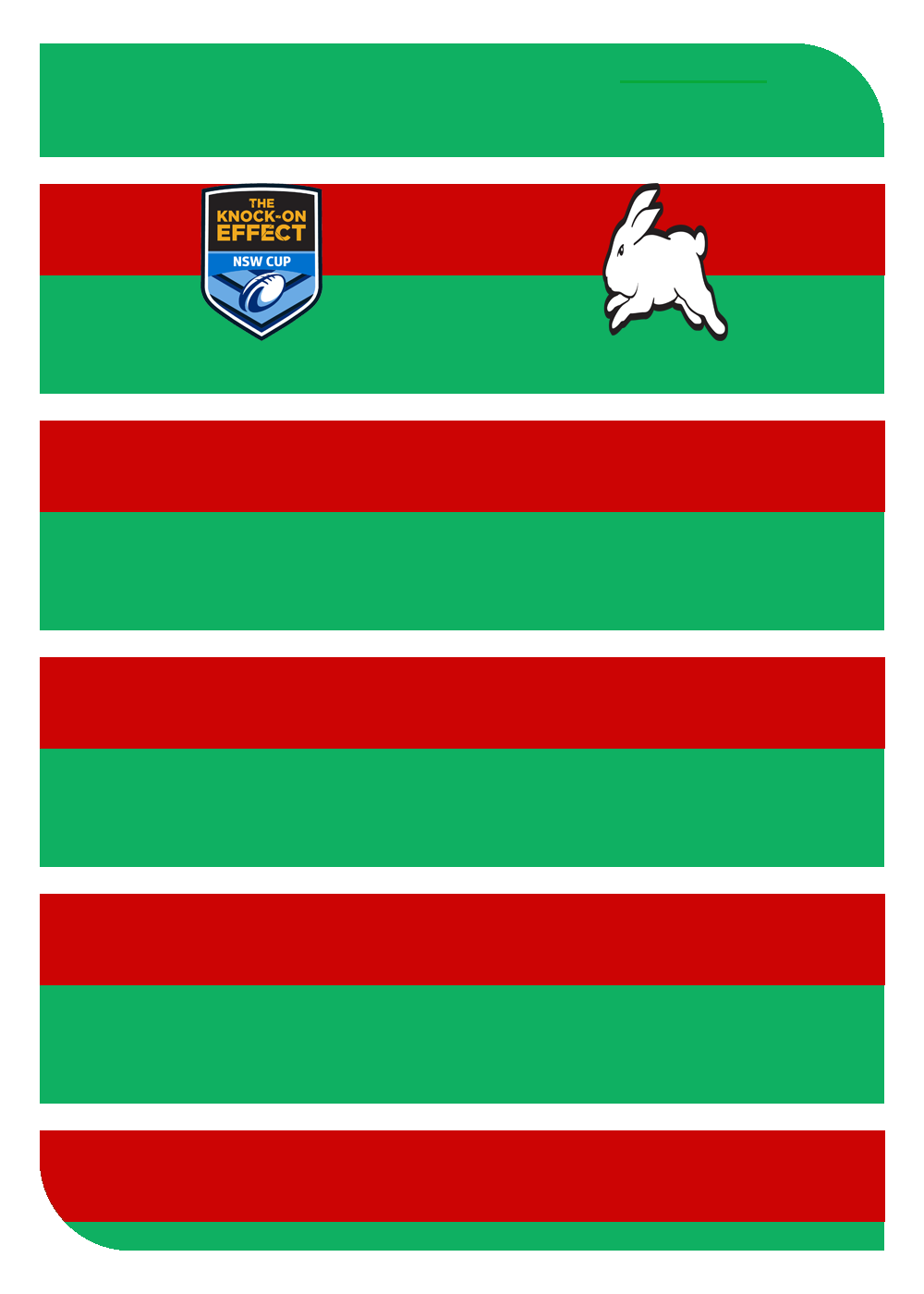
South Sydney; Rabbitohs Ground: Redfern Oval City/Suburb: Sydney (Redfern) Coach: Wayne Collins Affiliate: South Sydney Rabbitohs

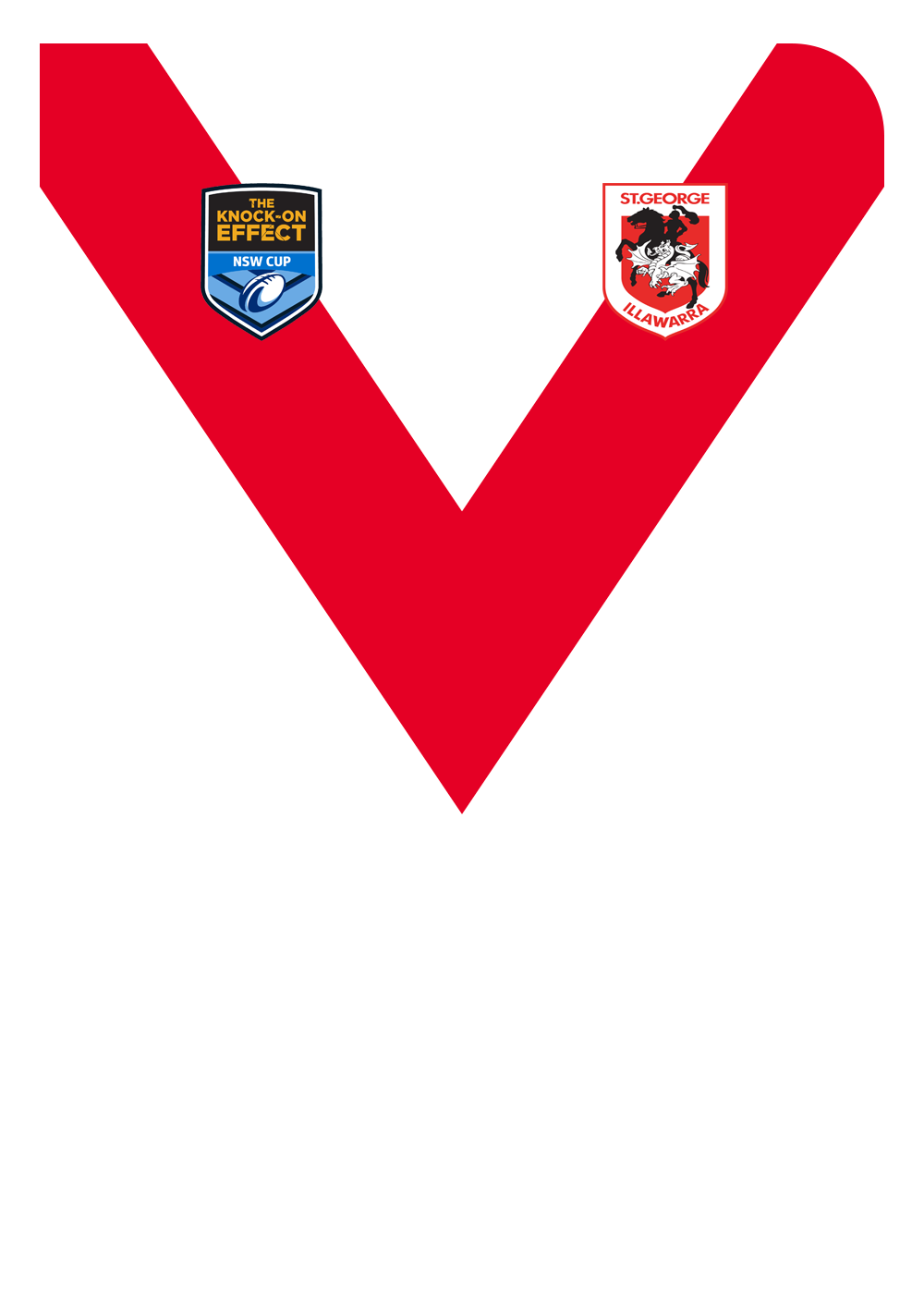
St George Illawarra; Dragons Ground: Collegians Sports Stadium City/Suburb: Wollongong (Figtree) Coach: Willie Talau Affiliate: St. George Illawarra Dragons

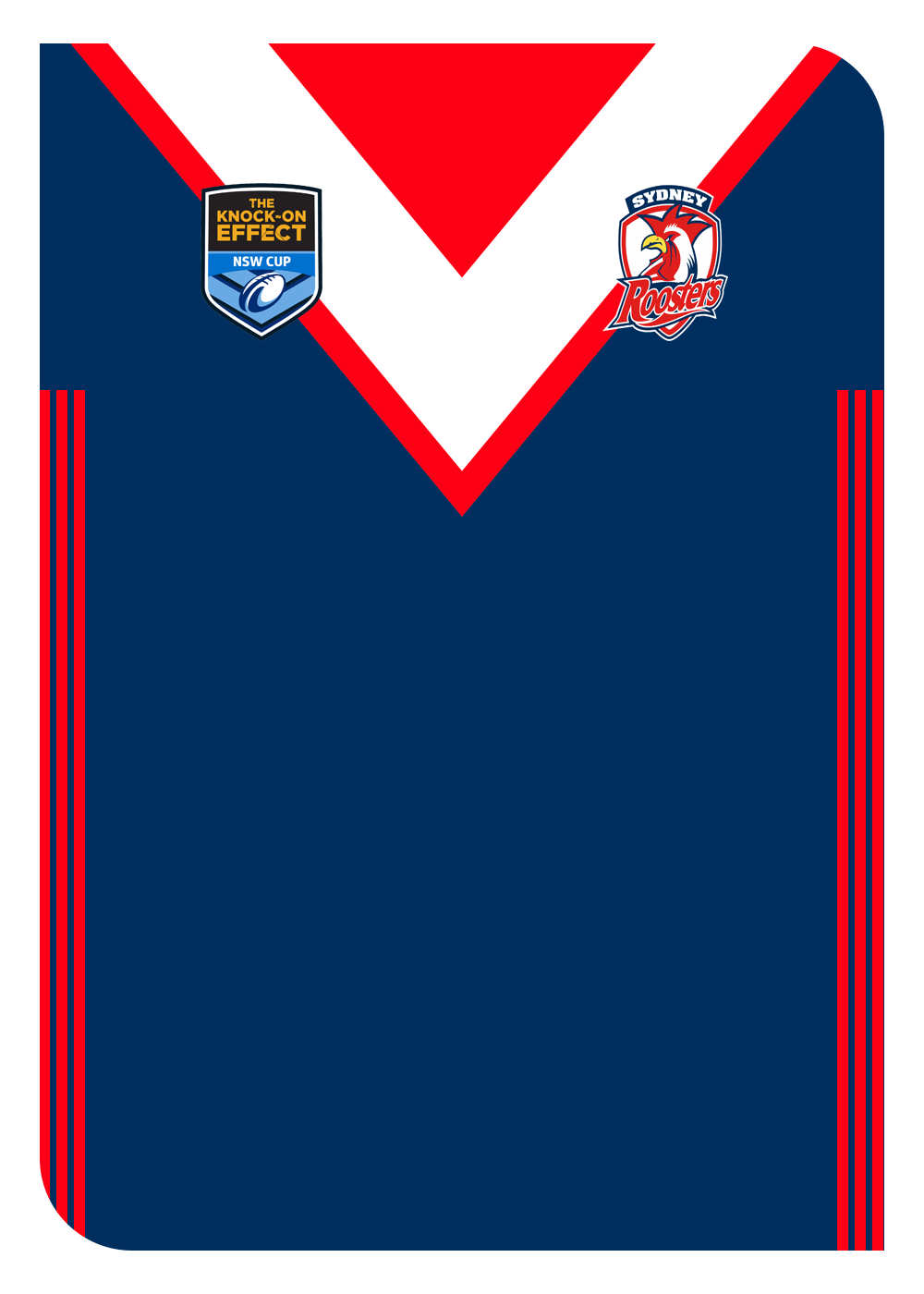
Sydney; Roosters Ground: Wentworth Park City/Suburb: Sydney (Glebe) Coach: Brett Morris Affiliate: Sydney Roosters

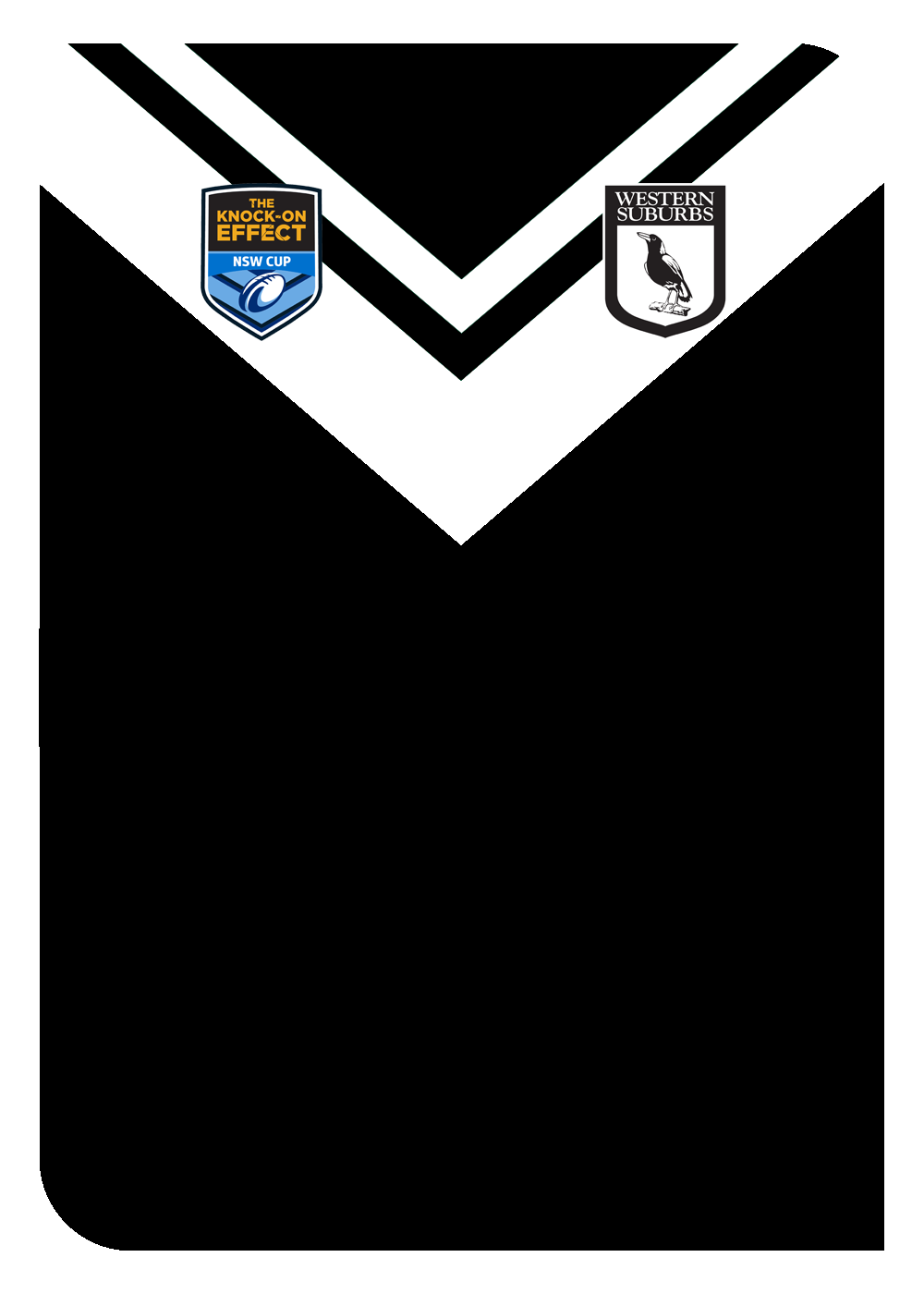
Western Suburbs; Magpies Ground: Lidcombe Oval City/Suburb: Sydney (Lidcombe) Coach: Tyrone McCarthy Affiliate: Wests Tigers

==== Ladder ====
Pos	Team	Pld	W	D	L	B	PF	PA	PD	Pts	Qualification
1	Sydney Roosters (R)	6	4	0	2	1	204	131	+73	10	Minor Premiers & Major Semi-Final
2	St George Illawarra Dragons (R)	6	4	0	2	1	182	116	+66	10	Qualifying Final
3	North Sydney Bears	5	4	0	1	1	140	92	+48	10	Qualifying Final
4	Newcastle Knights (R)	7	5	0	2	0	217	172	+45	10	Elimination Final
5	South Sydney Rabbitohs (R)	6	4	0	2	1	150	142	+8	10	Elimination Final
6	Penrith Panthers (R)	6	4	1	1	0	182	114	+68	9	
7	Newtown Jets	5	3	0	2	1	141	120	+21	8	
8	New Zealand Warriors (R)	7	4	0	3	0	197	198	–1	8	
9	Canterbury-Bankstown Bulldogs (R)	6	3	0	3	1	132	168	–36	8	
10	Melbourne Storm (R)	6	2	0	4	1	124	202	–78	6	
11	Parramatta Eels (R)	6	1	1	4	1	132	196	–64	5	
12	Western Suburbs Magpies	5	1	0	4	1	108	123	–15	4	
13	Manly Warringah Sea Eagles (R)	6	1	0	5	1	122	232	–110	4	
14	Canberra Raiders (R)	7	1	0	6	0	186	211	–25	2	

Updated to match(es) played on 21 April 2026. Source:
Rules for classification: 1) points; 2) point difference; 3) points scored

===== Ladder progression =====
As of 6 April 2026.

- Numbers highlighted in green indicate that the team finished the round inside the top 5.
- Numbers highlighted in blue indicates the team finished first on the ladder in that round.
- Numbers highlighted in red indicates the team finished last place on the ladder in that round.
- Underlined numbers indicate that the team had a bye during that round.

Pos	Team	1	2	3	4	5	6	7	8	9	10	11	12	13	14	15	16	17	18	19	20	21	22	23	24	25	26
1	Newcastle Knights (R)	2	4	6	6	8																					
2	Sydney Roosters (R)	2	4	4	6	8																					
3	St George Illawarra Dragons (R)	2	4	6	6	8																					
4	North Sydney Bears	0	2	4	6	8																					
5	Penrith Panthers (R)	2	2	4	5	7																					
6	Newtown Jets	2	4	4	6	6																					
7	New Zealand Warriors (R)	0	2	2	4	6																					
8	South Sydney Rabbitohs (R)	0	0	2	4	6																					
9	Canterbury-Bankstown Bulldogs (R)	0	2	4	6	8																					
10	Parramatta Eels (R)	2	4	4	5	5																					
11	Western Suburbs Magpies	2	2	2	2	4																					
12	Melbourne Storm (R)	0	0	2	4	4																					
13	Manly Warringah Sea Eagles (R)	2	2	4	4	4																					
14	Canberra Raiders (R)	0	0	0	0	0																					

Season Results:

Home	Score	Away	Match Information
Home	Score	Away	Date and Time	Venue	Referee	Video
Round 1
Melbourne Storm (R)	22 – 36	Parramatta Eels (R)	Thursday, 5 March, 5:15pm	AAMI Park	Damian Brady
New Zealand Warriors (R)	14 – 48	Sydney Roosters (R)	Friday, 6 March, 5:15pm	Go Media Stadium	Paki Parkinson
Penrith Panthers (R)	20 – 16	North Sydney Bears	Saturday, 7 March, 2:00pm	St Marys Leagues Stadium	Dillan Wells
Canterbury-Bankstown Bulldogs (R)	10 – 14	St George Illawarra Dragons (R)	Saturday, 7 March, 4:15pm	Belmore Sports Ground	Ethan Klein
Manly Warringah Sea Eagles (R)	28 – 26	Canberra Raiders (R)	Saturday, 7 March, 5:00pm	4 Pines Park	Mitchell Currie
Newcastle Knights (R)	52 – 10	South Sydney Rabbitohs (R)	Sunday, 8 March, 2:00pm	Cessnock Sportsground	Luke Saldern
Newtown Jets	BYE	Western Suburbs Magpies
Round 2
New Zealand Warriors (R)	44 – 12	Canberra Raiders (R)	Friday, 13 March, 5:15pm	Go Media Stadium	Paki Parkinson
Western Suburbs Magpies	16 – 26	North Sydney Bears	Saturday, 14 March, 2:00pm	Lidcombe Oval	Luke Saldern
St George Illawarra Dragons (R)	42 – 26	Melbourne Storm (R)	Saturday, 14 March, 3:10pm	WIN Stadium	Ethan Klein
Penrith Panthers (R)	16 – 38	Newtown Jets	Saturday, 14 March, 4:45pm	St Marys Leagues Stadium	Mitchell Currie
Manly Warringah Sea Eagles (R)	24 – 46	Newcastle Knights (R)	Sunday, 15 March, 1:45pm	4 Pines Park	Tom Stindl
South Sydney Rabbitohs (R)	18 – 30	Sydney Roosters (R)	Sunday, 15 March, 2:00pm	Redfern Oval	Dillan Wells
Canterbury-Bankstown Bulldogs (R)	BYE	Parramatta Eels (R)
Round 3
Newcastle Knights (R)	32 – 22	New Zealand Warriors (R)	Saturday, 21 March, 12:40pm	McDonald Jones Stadium	Luke Saldern
Melbourne Storm (R)	20 – 12	Newtown Jets	Saturday, 21 March, 2:00pm	Seabrook Reserve	Dillan Wells
Canberra Raiders (R)	26 – 28	Canterbury-Bankstown Bulldogs (R)	Saturday, 21 March, 3:00pm	Raiders Belconnen	Ethan Klein
South Sydney Rabbitohs (R)	20 – 12	Western Suburbs Magpies	Saturday, 21 March, 5:10pm	Polytec Stadium	Tom Stindl
Parramatta Eels (R)	8 – 38	St George Illawarra Dragons (R)	Sunday, 22 March, 1:35pm	CommBank Stadium	Ziggy Pzeklasa-Adamski
Sydney Roosters (R)	12 – 38	Penrith Panthers (R)	Sunday, 22 March, 2:45pm	Wentworth Park	Mitchell Currie
North Sydney Bears	BYE	Manly Warringah Sea Eagles (R)
Round 4
New Zealand Warriors (R)	29 – 28	Western Suburbs Magpies	Friday, 27 March, 5:15pm	Go Media Stadium	Ethan Klein
Manly Warringah Sea Eagles (R)	18 – 44	Sydney Roosters (R)	Saturday, 28 March, 12:00pm	Wentworth Park	Luke Saldern
Canterbury-Bankstown Bulldogs (R)	32 – 28	Newcastle Knights (R)	Saturday, 28 March, 12:00pm	Belmore Sports Ground	Billy Greatbatch
St George Illawarra Dragons (R)	14 – 32	North Sydney Bears	Saturday, 28 March, 1:00pm	Michael Cronin Oval	Michael Ford
Penrith Panthers (R)	26 – 26	Parramatta Eels (R)	Saturday, 28 March, 8:00pm	CommBank Stadium	Dillan Wells
Canberra Raiders (R)	26 – 34	Newtown Jets	Sunday, 29 March, 1:45pm	GIO Stadium	Tom Stindl
South Sydney Rabbitohs (R)	BYE	Melbourne Storm (R)
Round 5 (Easter Round)
South Sydney Rabbitohs (R)	36 – 10	Canterbury-Bankstown Bulldogs (R)	Friday, 3 April, 1:45pm	Accor Stadium	Luke Saldern
Penrith Panthers (R)	40 – 12	Melbourne Storm (R)	Friday, 3 April, 5:25pm	CommBank Stadium	Kieren Irons
Newtown Jets	24 – 26	New Zealand Warriors (R)	Saturday, 4 April, 3:00pm	Henson Park	Ethan Klein
Manly Warringah Sea Eagles (R)	18 – 26	North Sydney Bears	Saturday, 4 April, 3:00pm	Lionel Watts Park	Tom Stindl
Newcastle Knights (R)	25 – 24	Canberra Raiders (R)	Sunday, 5 April, 1:35pm	McDonald Jones Stadium	Daniel Luttringer
Parramatta Eels (R)	24 – 30	Western Suburbs Magpies	Monday, 6 April, 1:40pm	CommBank Stadium	Belinda Sharpe
St George Illawarra Dragons (R)	BYE	Sydney Roosters (R)
Round 6
Canterbury-Bankstown Bulldogs (R)	V	Penrith Panthers (R)	Friday, 10 April, 5:00pm	Belmore Sports Ground	TBA
St George Illawarra Dragons (R)	V	Manly Warringah Sea Eagles (R)	Saturday, 11 April, 1:00pm	Collegians Sports Stadium	TBA
Newtown Jets	V	Sydney Roosters (R)	Saturday, 11 April, 3:00pm	Henson Park	TBA
Melbourne Storm (R)	V	New Zealand Warriors (R)	Saturday, 11 April, 4:45pm	AAMI Park	TBA
Western Suburbs Magpies	V	Newcastle Knights (R)	Sunday, 12 April, 1:40pm	Campbelltown Sports Stadium	TBA
North Sydney Bears	V	Canberra Raiders (R)	Sunday, 12 April, 3:00pm	North Sydney Oval	TBA
Parramatta Eels (R)	V	South Sydney Rabbitohs (R)	Sunday, 12 April, 6:00pm	James Hardie Centre of Excellence	TBA
Round 7
Canberra Raiders (R)	V	Melbourne Storm (R)	Saturday, 18 April, 2:00pm	Seiffert Oval	TBA
New Zealand Warriors (R)	V	Manly Warringah Sea Eagles (R)	Saturday, 18 April, 2:15pm	Go Media Stadium	TBA
South Sydney Rabbitohs (R)	V	St George Illawarra Dragons (R)	Saturday, 18 April, 3:10pm	Accor Stadium	TBA
Parramatta Eels (R)	V	Canterbury-Bankstown Bulldogs (R)	Sunday, 19 April, 1:35pm	CommBank Stadium	TBA
Sydney Roosters (R)	V	Newcastle Knights (R)	Sunday, 19 April, 2:45pm	Wentworth Park	TBA
North Sydney Bears	BYE	Newtown Jets
Western Suburbs Magpies	BYE	Penrith Panthers (R)
Round 8 (ANZAC Round)
Melbourne Storm (R)	V	South Sydney Rabbitohs (R)	Friday, 24 April, 4:00pm	Seabrook Reserve	TBA
New Zealand Warriors (R)	V	North Sydney Bears	Friday, 24 April, 12:00pm	FMG Stadium Waikato	TBA
Newtown Jets	V	Canterbury-Bankstown Bulldogs (R)	Saturday, 25 April, 2:00pm	Henson Park	TBA
Western Suburbs Magpies	V	Canberra Raiders (R)	Saturday, 25 April, 2:00pm	Lidcombe Oval	TBA
Newcastle Knights (R)	V	Penrith Panthers (R)	Sunday, 26 April, 11:15am	McDonald Jones Stadium	TBA
St George Illawarra Dragons (R)	V	Sydney Roosters (R)	Sunday, 26 April, 1:00pm	Collegians Sports Stadium	TBA
Manly Warringah Sea Eagles (R)	V	Parramatta Eels (R)	Sunday, 26 April, 1:30pm	4 Pines Park	TBA
Round 9
Canterbury-Bankstown Bulldogs (R)	V	North Sydney Bears	Friday, 1 May, 3:30pm	Accor Stadium	TBA
Parramatta Eels (R)	V	New Zealand Warriors (R)	Saturday, 2 May, 1:00pm	James Hardie Centre of Excellence	TBA
Newtown Jets	V	Western Suburbs Magpies	Saturday, 2 May, 3:00pm	Henson Park	TBA
Sydney Roosters (R)	V	Canberra Raiders (R)	Saturday, 2 May, 5:00pm	Allianz Stadium	TBA
Newcastle Knights (R)	V	Melbourne Storm (R)	Sunday, 3 May, 11:30am	McDonald Jones Stadium	TBA
Penrith Panthers (R)	V	Manly Warringah Sea Eagles (R)	Sunday, 3 May, 1:00pm	Parker Street Reserve	TBA
St George Illawarra Dragons (R)	BYE	South Sydney Rabbitohs (R)
Round 10
St George Illawarra Dragons (R)	V	Newcastle Knights (R)	Saturday, 9 May, 12:40pm	WIN Stadium	TBA
Canterbury-Bankstown Bulldogs (R)	V	Sydney Roosters (R)	Saturday, 9 May, 2:15pm	Belmore Sports Ground	TBA
Parramatta Eels (R)	V	North Sydney Bears	Saturday, 9 May, 4:00pm	James Hardie Centre of Excellence	TBA
Melbourne Storm (R)	V	Western Suburbs Magpies	Sunday, 10 May, 11:30am	AAMI Park	TBA
South Sydney Rabbitohs (R)	V	Newtown Jets	Sunday, 10 May, 2:00pm	Coogee Oval	TBA
Canberra Raiders (R)	V	Penrith Panthers (R)	Sunday, 10 May, 6:15pm	GIO Stadium	TBA
Manly Warringah Sea Eagles (R)	BYE	New Zealand Warriors (R)
Round 11 (Festival of Footy)
Penrith Panthers (R)	V	Western Suburbs Magpies	Saturday, 16 May, 12:00pm	North Sydney Oval	TBA
Newcastle Knights (R)	V	Newtown Jets	Saturday, 16 May, 2:00pm	North Sydney Oval	TBA
North Sydney Bears	V	Sydney Roosters (R)	Saturday, 16 May, 4:00pm	North Sydney Oval	TBA
South Sydney Rabbitohs (R)	V	Manly Warringah Sea Eagles (R)	Sunday, 17 May, 11:00am	North Sydney Oval	TBA
New Zealand Warriors (R)	V	Melbourne Storm (R)	Sunday, 17 May, 1:00pm	North Sydney Oval	TBA
St George Illawarra Dragons (R)	V	Parramatta Eels (R)	Sunday, 17 May, 3:00pm	North Sydney Oval	TBA
Canterbury-Bankstown Bulldogs (R)	BYE	Canberra Raiders (R)
Round 12
Canberra Raiders (R)	V	Manly Warringah Sea Eagles (R)	Saturday, 23 May, 3:00pm	Seiffert Oval	TBA
St George Illawarra Dragons (R)	V	New Zealand Warriors (R)	Saturday, 23 May, 3:10pm	Jubilee Stadium	TBA
Canterbury-Bankstown Bulldogs (R)	V	Melbourne Storm (R)	Saturday, 23 May, 4:15pm	Belmore Sports Ground	TBA
North Sydney Bears	V	South Sydney Rabbitohs (R)	Sunday, 24 May, 3:00pm	North Sydney Oval	TBA
Parramatta Eels (R)	BYE	Newtown Jets
Newcastle Knights (R)	BYE	Western Suburbs Magpies
Penrith Panthers (R)	BYE	Sydney Roosters (R)
Round 13
Western Suburbs Magpies	V	Canterbury-Bankstown Bulldogs (R)	Saturday, 30 May, 2:00pm	Lidcombe Oval	TBA
Newtown Jets	V	Manly Warringah Sea Eagles (R)	Saturday, 30 May, 3:00pm	Henson Park	TBA
Melbourne Storm (R)	V	Sydney Roosters (R)	Saturday, 30 May, 4:45pm	AAMI Park	TBA
Penrith Panthers (R)	V	New Zealand Warriors (R)	Saturday, 30 May, TBA	Parker Street Reserve	TBA
Newcastle Knights (R)	V	Parramatta Eels (R)	Sunday, 31 May, 12:30pm	McDonald Jones Stadium	TBA
Canberra Raiders (R)	V	St George Illawarra Dragons (R)	Sunday, 31 May, 1:45pm	GIO Stadium	TBA
North Sydney Bears	BYE	South Sydney Rabbitohs (R)
Round 14
Melbourne Storm (R)	V	Newcastle Knights (R)	Saturday, 6 June, 10:00am	Seabrook Reserve	TBA
Manly Warringah Sea Eagles (R)	V	South Sydney Rabbitohs (R)	Saturday, 6 June, 3:00pm	4 Pines Park	TBA
Newtown Jets	V	St George Illawarra Dragons (R)	Saturday, 6 June, 3:00pm	Henson Park	TBA
Western Suburbs Magpies	V	Penrith Panthers (R)	Sunday, 7 June, 12:00pm	Lidcombe Oval	TBA
Sydney Roosters (R)	V	North Sydney Bears	Sunday, 7 June, 2:45pm	Wentworth Park	TBA
Canterbury-Bankstown Bulldogs (R)	V	Parramatta Eels (R)	Monday, 8 June, 1:40pm	Accor Stadium	TBA
Canberra Raiders (R)	BYE	New Zealand Warriors (R)
Round 15
South Sydney Rabbitohs (R)	V	North Sydney Bears	Saturday, 13 June, 2:00pm	Redfern Oval	TBA
Parramatta Eels (R)	V	Canberra Raiders (R)	Saturday, 13 June, 5:00pm	CommBank Stadium	TBA
New Zealand Warriors (R)	V	Newtown Jets	Saturday, 13 June, 5:15pm	Go Media Stadium	TBA
Western Suburbs Magpies	V	Sydney Roosters (R)	Sunday, 14 June, 1:00pm	Lidcombe Oval	TBA
Canterbury-Bankstown Bulldogs (R)	BYE	St George Illawarra Dragons (R)
Newcastle Knights (R)	BYE	Penrith Panthers (R)
Manly Warringah Sea Eagles (R)	BYE	Melbourne Storm (R)
Round 16
Newcastle Knights (R)	V	St George Illawarra Dragons (R)	Friday, 19 June, 5:30pm	McDonald Jones Stadium	TBA
Western Suburbs Magpies	V	Manly Warringah Sea Eagles (R)	Saturday, 20 June, 12:40pm	Campbelltown Sports Stadium	TBA
New Zealand Warriors (R)	V	Canterbury-Bankstown Bulldogs (R)	Sunday, 21 June, 1:30pm	One NZ Stadium	TBA
Melbourne Storm (R)	V	Canberra Raiders (R)	Sunday, 21 June, 1:45pm	AAMI Park	TBA
North Sydney Bears	V	Penrith Panthers (R)	Sunday, 21 June, 3:00pm	North Sydney Oval	TBA
Sydney Roosters (R)	V	Newtown Jets	Sunday, 21 June, 3:45pm	Allianz Stadium	TBA
Parramatta Eels (R)	BYE	South Sydney Rabbitohs (R)
Round 17 (Magic Round)
Parramatta Eels (R)	V	Newcastle Knights (R)	Friday, 26 June, 7:00pm	Scully Park	TBA
St George Illawarra Dragons (R)	V	Penrith Panthers (R)	Saturday, 27 June, 11:00am	Scully Park	TBA
Sydney Roosters (R)	V	South Sydney Rabbitohs (R)	Saturday, 27 June, 3:00pm	Scully Park	TBA
North Sydney Bears	V	Melbourne Storm (R)	Sunday, 28 June, 11:00am	Scully Park	TBA
Canberra Raiders (R)	V	New Zealand Warriors (R)	Sunday, 28 June, 11:40am	GIO Stadium	TBA
Manly Warringah Sea Eagles (R)	V	Canterbury-Bankstown Bulldogs (R)	Sunday, 28 June, 3:00pm	Scully Park	TBA
Newtown Jets	BYE	Western Suburbs Magpies
Round 18
Penrith Panthers (R)	V	South Sydney Rabbitohs (R)	Friday, 3 July, 5:45pm	CommBank Stadium	TBA
St George Illawarra Dragons (R)	V	Western Suburbs Magpies	Saturday, 4 July, 1:00pm	Collegians Sports Stadium	TBA
North Sydney Bears	V	Newtown Jets	Sunday, 5 July, 3:00pm	North Sydney Oval	TBA
Parramatta Eels (R)	V	Manly Warringah Sea Eagles (R)	Sunday, 5 July, 6:00pm	James Hardie Centre of Excellence	TBA
Canterbury-Bankstown Bulldogs (R)	BYE	Newcastle Knights (R)
Canberra Raiders (R)	BYE	Sydney Roosters (R)
Melbourne Storm (R)	BYE	New Zealand Warriors (R)
Round 19
Canterbury-Bankstown Bulldogs (R)	V	Canberra Raiders (R)	Saturday, 11 July, 1:00pm	Belmore Sports Ground	TBA
South Sydney Rabbitohs (R)	V	Newcastle Knights (R)	Saturday, 11 July, 2:00pm	Redfern Oval	TBA
Western Suburbs Magpies	V	New Zealand Warriors (R)	Saturday, 11 July, 2:00pm	Lidcombe Oval	TBA
Newtown Jets	V	Melbourne Storm (R)	Saturday, 11 July, 3:00pm	Henson Park	TBA
Sydney Roosters (R)	V	Parramatta Eels (R)	Sunday, 12 July, 2:45pm	Wentworth Park	TBA
North Sydney Bears	V	Manly Warringah Sea Eagles (R)	Sunday, 12 July, 3:00pm	North Sydney Oval	TBA
St George Illawarra Dragons (R)	BYE	Penrith Panthers (R)
Round 20
Sydney Roosters (R)	V	Melbourne Storm (R)	Friday, 17 July, 5:30pm	Allianz Stadium	TBA
Canterbury-Bankstown Bulldogs (R)	V	Western Suburbs Magpies	Saturday, 18 July, 2:15pm	Belmore Sports Ground	TBA
Manly Warringah Sea Eagles (R)	V	Penrith Panthers (R)	Saturday, 18 July, 2:30pm	4 Pines Park	TBA
New Zealand Warriors (R)	V	St George Illawarra Dragons (R)	Saturday, 18 July, 2:45pm	Go Media Stadium	TBA
Newtown Jets	V	Newcastle Knights (R)	Saturday, 18 July, 3:30pm	Henson Park	TBA
Canberra Raiders (R)	V	South Sydney Rabbitohs (R)	Saturday, 18 July, 5:15pm	GIO Stadium	TBA
North Sydney Bears	BYE	Parramatta Eels (R)
Round 21
Parramatta Eels (R)	V	Penrith Panthers (R)	Thursday, 23 July, 5:20pm	CommBank Stadium	TBA
Newcastle Knights (R)	V	Sydney Roosters (R)	Friday, 24 July, 5:30pm	McDonald Jones Stadium	TBA
Canterbury-Bankstown Bulldogs (R)	V	New Zealand Warriors (R)	Saturday, 25 July, 1:15pm	Belmore Sports Ground	TBA
South Sydney Rabbitohs (R)	V	Melbourne Storm (R)	Saturday, 25 July, 2:00pm	Redfern Oval	TBA
Canberra Raiders (R)	V	Western Suburbs Magpies	Saturday, 25 July, 5:15pm	GIO Stadium	TBA
Manly Warringah Sea Eagles (R)	V	Newtown Jets	Sunday, 26 July, 1:30pm	4 Pines Park	TBA
North Sydney Bears	V	St George Illawarra Dragons (R)	Sunday, 26 July, 3:00pm	North Sydney Oval	TBA
Round 22
Melbourne Storm (R)	V	Canterbury-Bankstown Bulldogs (R)	Friday, 31 July, 5:45pm	AAMI Park	TBA
Newcastle Knights (R)	V	North Sydney Bears	Saturday, 1 August, 1:00pm	Knights Centre of Excellence	TBA
Penrith Panthers (R)	V	Canberra Raiders (R)	Saturday, 1 August, 2:00pm	Parker Street Reserve	TBA
Newtown Jets	V	South Sydney Rabbitohs (R)	Saturday, 1 August, 3:00pm	Henson Park	TBA
Western Suburbs Magpies	V	Parramatta Eels (R)	Sunday, 2 August, 1:00pm	Lidcombe Oval	TBA
Sydney Roosters (R)	V	St George Illawarra Dragons (R)	Sunday, 2 August, 2:45pm	Wentworth Park	TBA
Manly Warringah Sea Eagles (R)	BYE	New Zealand Warriors (R)
Round 23
New Zealand Warriors (R)	V	Penrith Panthers (R)	Friday, 7 August, 5:15pm	Go Media Stadium	TBA
St George Illawarra Dragons (R)	V	Newtown Jets	Saturday, 8 August, 1:00pm	Collegians Sports Stadium	TBA
South Sydney Rabbitohs (R)	V	Parramatta Eels (R)	Saturday, 8 August, 2:00pm	Redfern Oval	TBA
North Sydney Bears	V	Western Suburbs Magpies	Saturday, 8 August, TBA	TBA	TBA
Melbourne Storm (R)	V	Manly Warringah Sea Eagles (R)	Saturday, 8 August, TBA	TBA	TBA
Sydney Roosters (R)	V	Canterbury-Bankstown Bulldogs (R)	Sunday, 9 August, 2:45pm	Wentworth Park	TBA
Canberra Raiders (R)	V	Newcastle Knights (R)	Sunday, 9 August, 4:15pm	GIO Stadium	TBA
Round 24
Penrith Panthers (R)	V	Sydney Roosters (R)	Friday, 14 August, 5:30pm	Parker Street Reserve	TBA
Canterbury-Bankstown Bulldogs (R)	V	South Sydney Rabbitohs (R)	Friday, 14 August, 5:30pm	Accor Stadium	TBA
Manly Warringah Sea Eagles (R)	V	New Zealand Warriors (R)	Saturday, 15 August, 1:00pm	4 Pines Park	TBA
Newtown Jets	V	Canberra Raiders (R)	Saturday, 15 August, 3:00pm	Henson Park	TBA
Western Suburbs Magpies	V	St George Illawarra Dragons (R)	Sunday, 16 August, 1:00pm	Lidcombe Oval	TBA
North Sydney Bears	V	Parramatta Eels (R)	Sunday, 16 August, 3:00pm	North Sydney Oval	TBA
Newcastle Knights (R)	BYE	Melbourne Storm (R)
Round 25
Melbourne Storm (R)	V	Penrith Panthers (R)	Friday, 21 August, 4:45pm	Seabrook Reserve	TBA
Newcastle Knights (R)	V	Manly Warringah Sea Eagles (R)	Saturday, 22 August, 10:30am	McDonald Jones Stadium	TBA
St George Illawarra Dragons (R)	V	Canterbury-Bankstown Bulldogs (R)	Saturday, 22 August, 1:00pm	Collegians Sports Stadium	TBA
South Sydney Rabbitohs (R)	V	New Zealand Warriors (R)	Saturday, 22 August, 1:30pm	Redfern Oval	TBA
Newtown Jets	V	North Sydney Bears	Saturday, 22 August, 3:00pm	Henson Park	TBA
Canberra Raiders (R)	V	Parramatta Eels (R)	Saturday, 22 August, 3:00pm	GIO Stadium	TBA
Sydney Roosters (R)	V	Western Suburbs Magpies	Sunday, 23 August, 2:45pm	Wentworth Park	TBA
Round 26
Manly Warringah Sea Eagles (R)	V	St George Illawarra Dragons (R)	Friday, 28 August, 3:30pm	4 Pines Park	TBA
Penrith Panthers (R)	V	Canterbury-Bankstown Bulldogs (R)	Saturday, 29 August, 2:00pm	Parker Street Reserve	TBA
Western Suburbs Magpies	V	South Sydney Rabbitohs (R)	Saturday, 29 August, 2:00pm	Lidcombe Oval	TBA
North Sydney Bears	V	Melbourne Storm (R)	Saturday, 29 August, 7:30pm	North Sydney Oval	TBA
New Zealand Warriors (R)	V	Newcastle Knights (R)	Sunday, 30 August, 11:20am	Go Media Stadium	TBA
Parramatta Eels (R)	V	Newtown Jets	Sunday, 30 August, 12:00pm	James Hardie Centre of Excellence	TBA
Canberra Raiders (R)	BYE	Sydney Roosters (R)
Finals Series
Qualifying & Elimination Finals
2nd Place	V	3rd Place	5/6 September	TBA	TBA
4th Place	V	5th Place	5/6 September	TBA	TBA
Semi-Finals
1st Place	V	QF Winner	12/13 September	TBA	TBA
QF Loser	V	EF Winner	12/13 September	TBA	TBA
Preliminary Final
Major SF Loser	V	Minor SF Winner	19/20 September	TBA	TBA
Grand Final
Major SF Winner	V	PF Winner	26/27 September	TBA	TBA

==== Finals series ====
Qualifying & Elimination Finals
2
3
4
5

Major Semi-Final
1
2/3
Minor Semi-Final
2/3
4/5

Preliminary Final
1/2/3
2/3/4/5

Grand Final
1/2/3
1/2/3/4/5

==== Grand Final ====
2026 New South Wales Cup Grand Final

26/27 September 2026
TBA

Major SF Winner	v	PF Winner

TBA

=== New South Wales Women's Premiership ===
2026 Harvey Norman Women's Premiership
- Duration: 13 June – 26/27 September 2026
- Teams: 12
- Broadcast partners: Streaming; BarTV Sports (All Matches)

The NSWRL Women's Premiership (named the Harvey Norman Women's Premiership for sponsorship reasons) is New South Wales' premier open-age women's rugby league competition. Nationally, along with the Queensland Women's Premiership, it is part of the tier-two structure that underpins the NRLW, providing a key stepping stone for elite female players moving from junior and regional competitions into the national stage.

==== Teams ====
===== Club changes =====
- South Sydney Rabbitohs – the club has entered into a new NRLW affiliation agreement with the New Zealand Warriors ahead of the 2026 season.

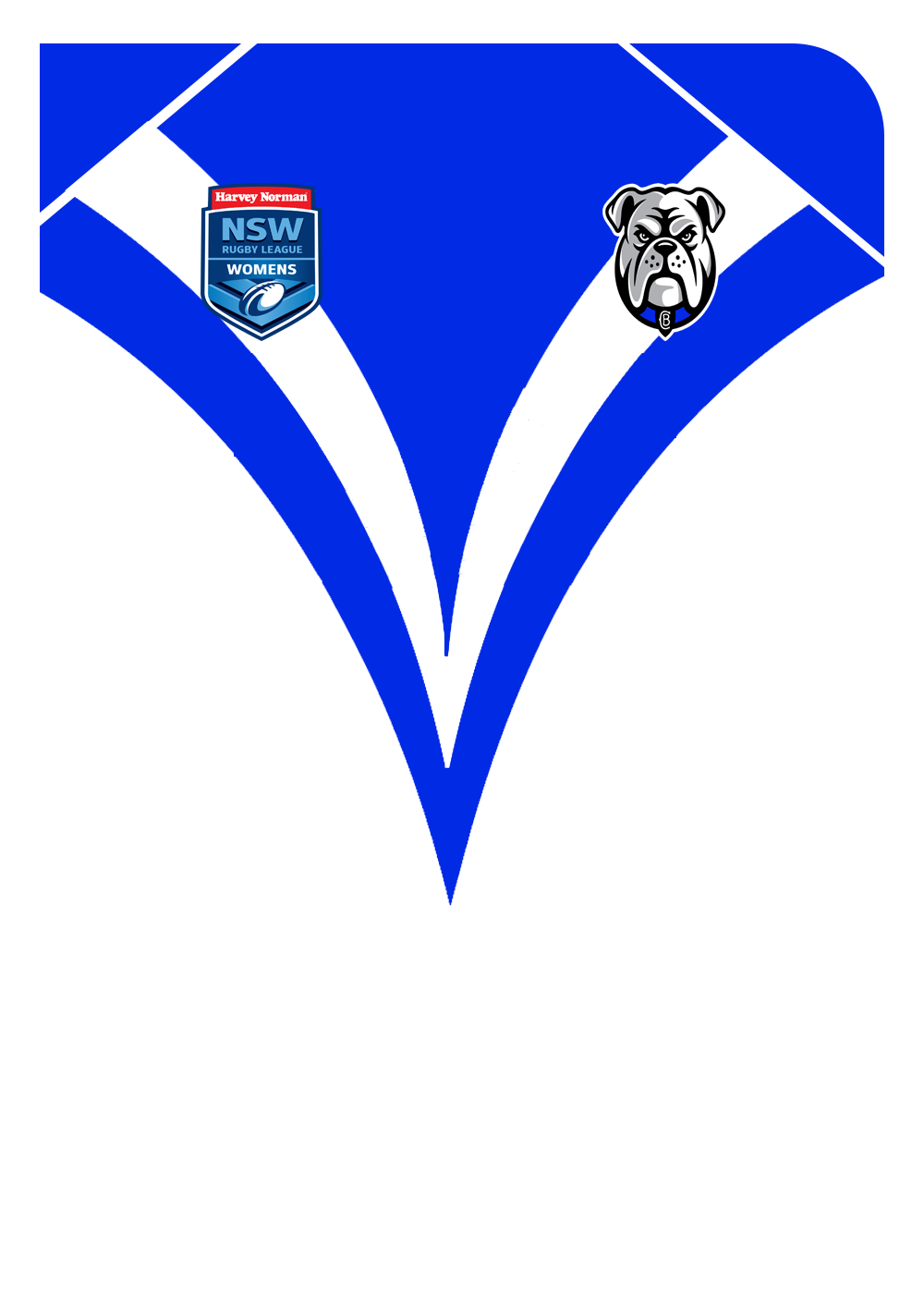
Canterbury-Bankstown; Bulldogs Ground: Hammondville Oval City/Suburb: Sydney (Hammondville) Coach: Bayden Wiliame Affiliate: Canterbury-Bankstown Bulldogs

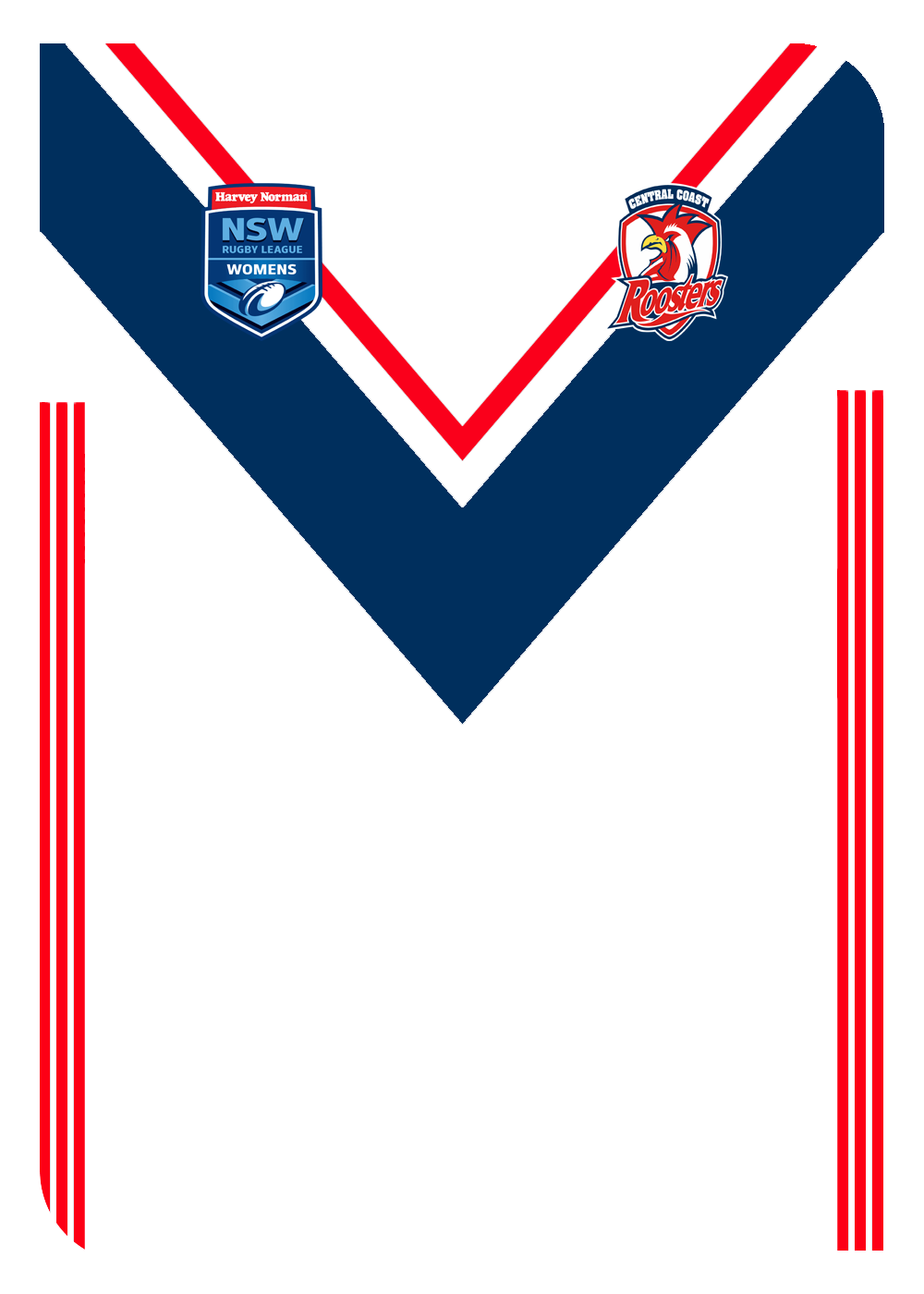
Central Coast; Roosters Ground: Woy Woy Oval City/Suburb: Woy Woy Coach: TBA Affiliate: Sydney Roosters

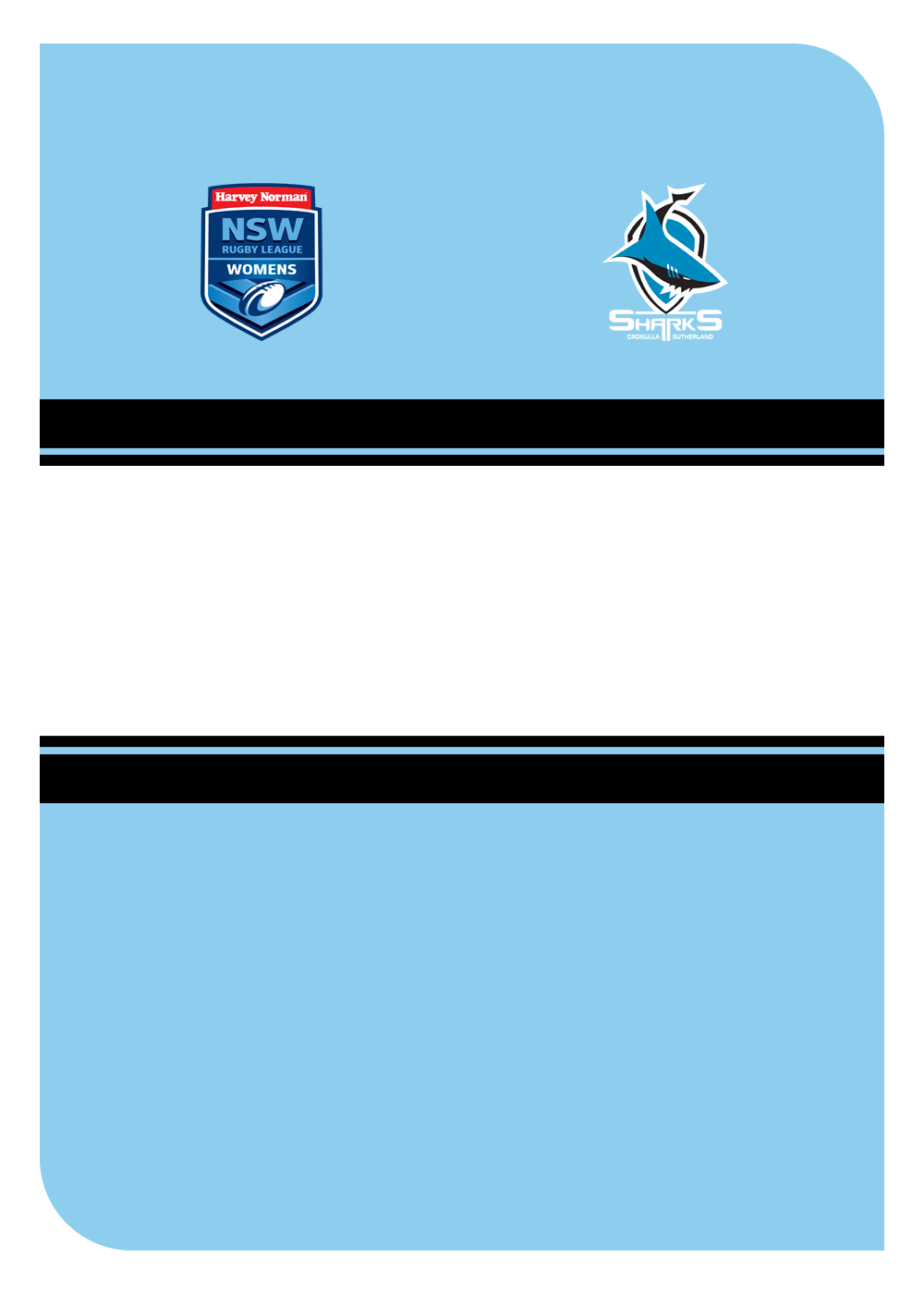
Cronulla-Sutherland; Sharks Ground: Ocean Protect Stadium City/Suburb: Sydney (Woolooware) Coach: TBA Affiliate: Cronulla-Sutherland Sharks

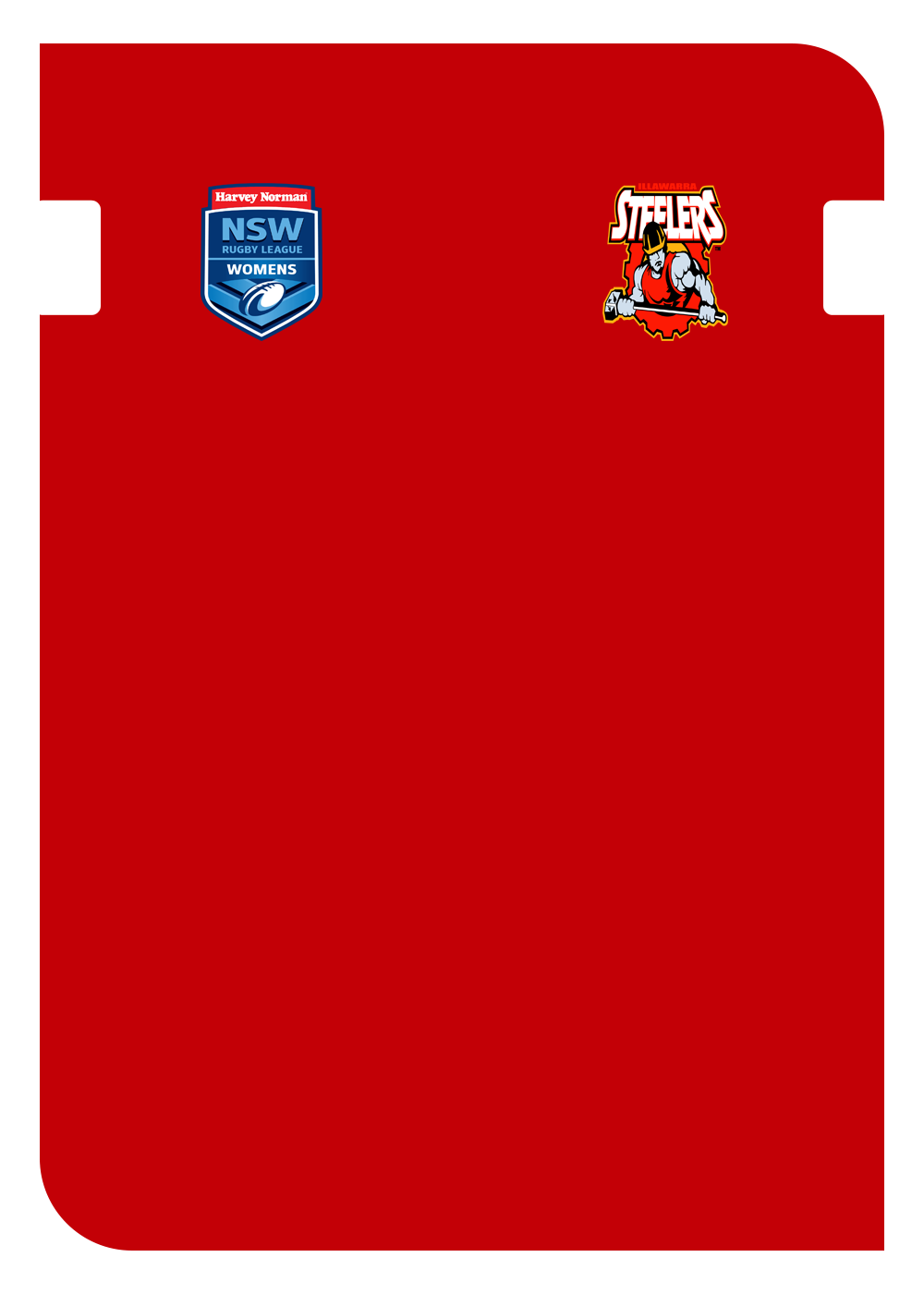
Illawarra; Steelers Ground: Collegians Sports Stadium City/Suburb: Wollongong (Figtree) Coach: TBA Affiliate: St George Illawarra Dragons

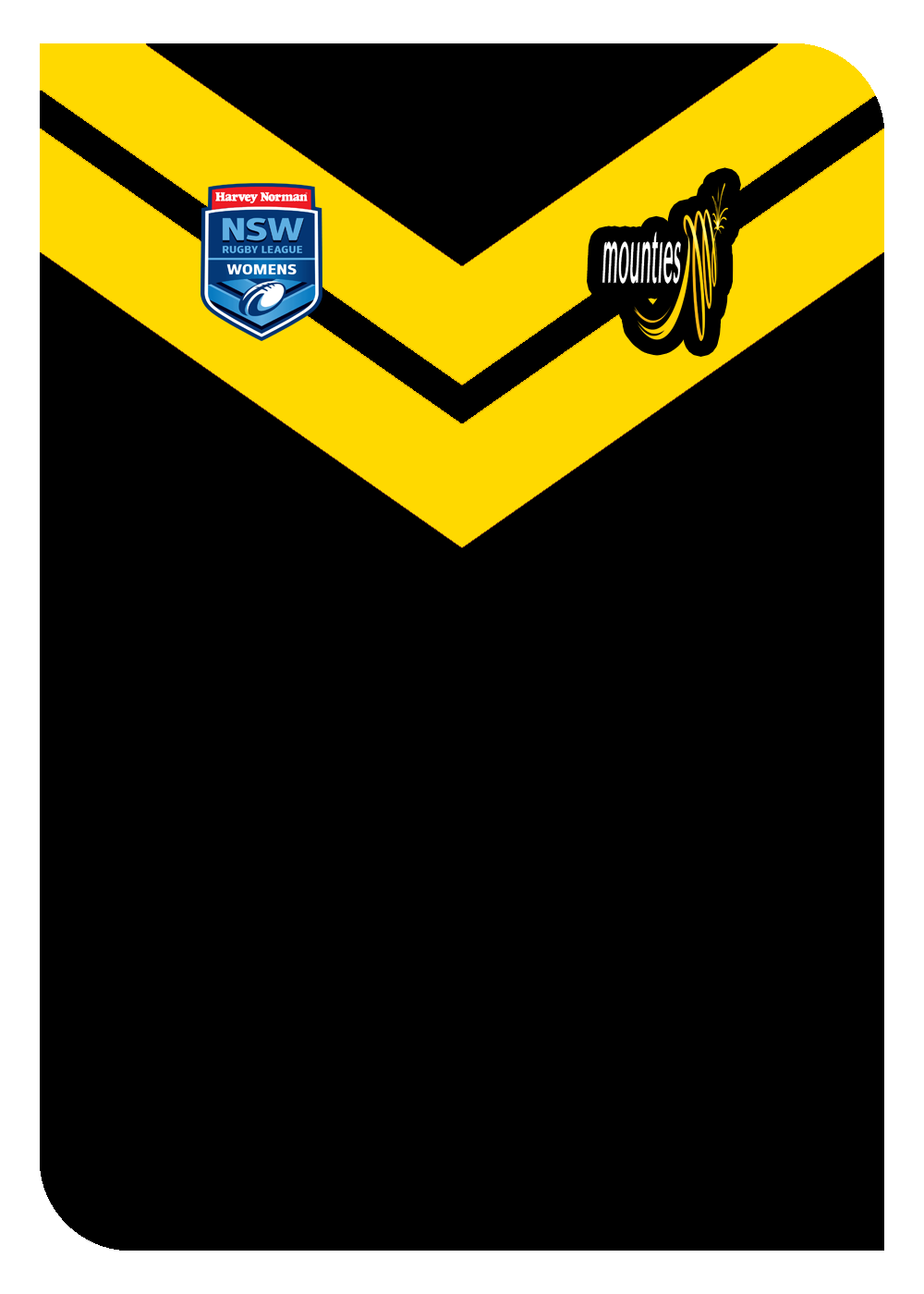
Mount Pritchard; Mounties Ground: Aubrey Keech Reserve City/Suburb: Sydney (Hinchinbrook) Coach: TBA Affiliate: Canberra Raiders

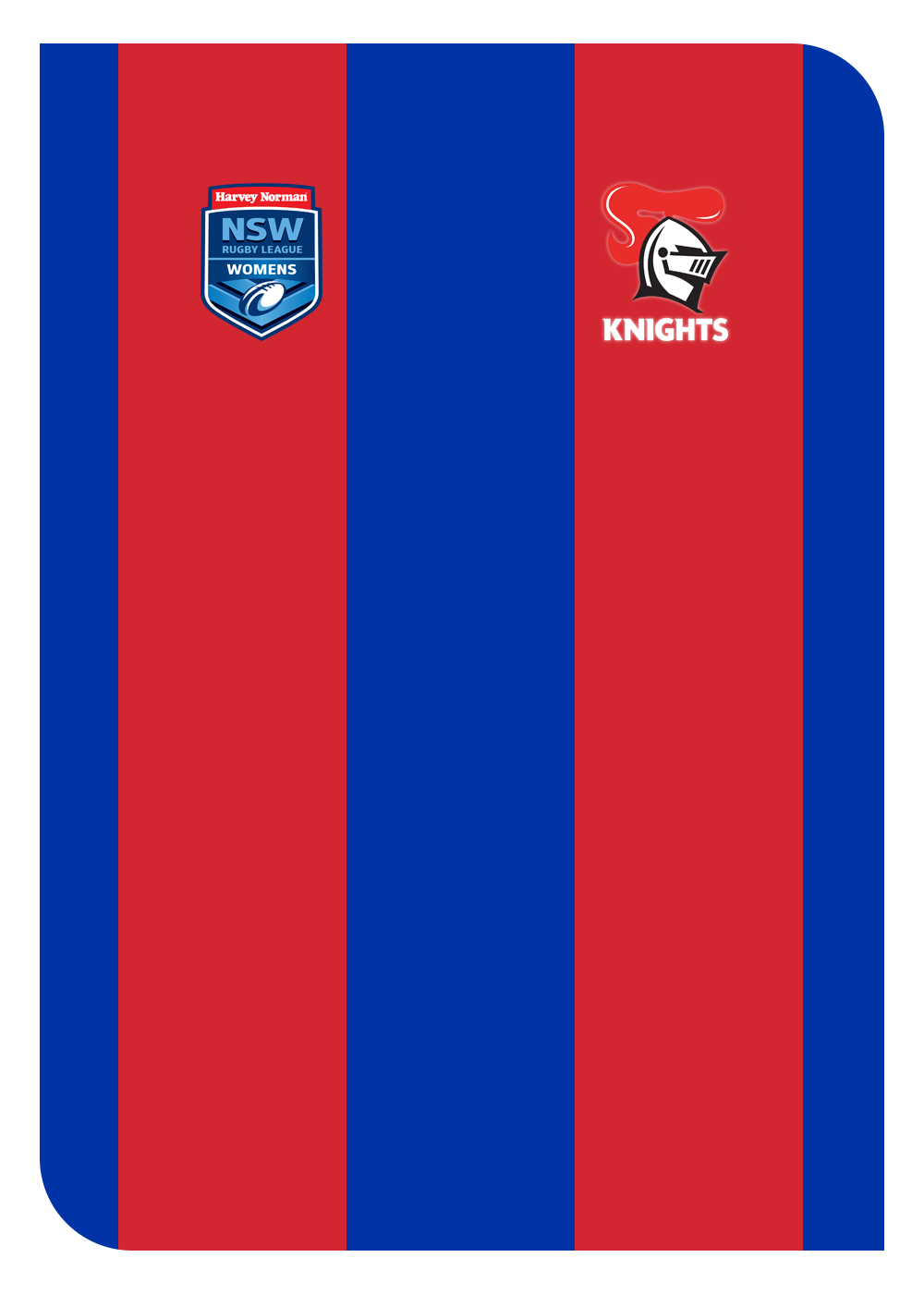
Newcastle; Knights Ground: TBA City/Suburb: Newcastle Coach: TBA Affiliate: Newcastle Knights

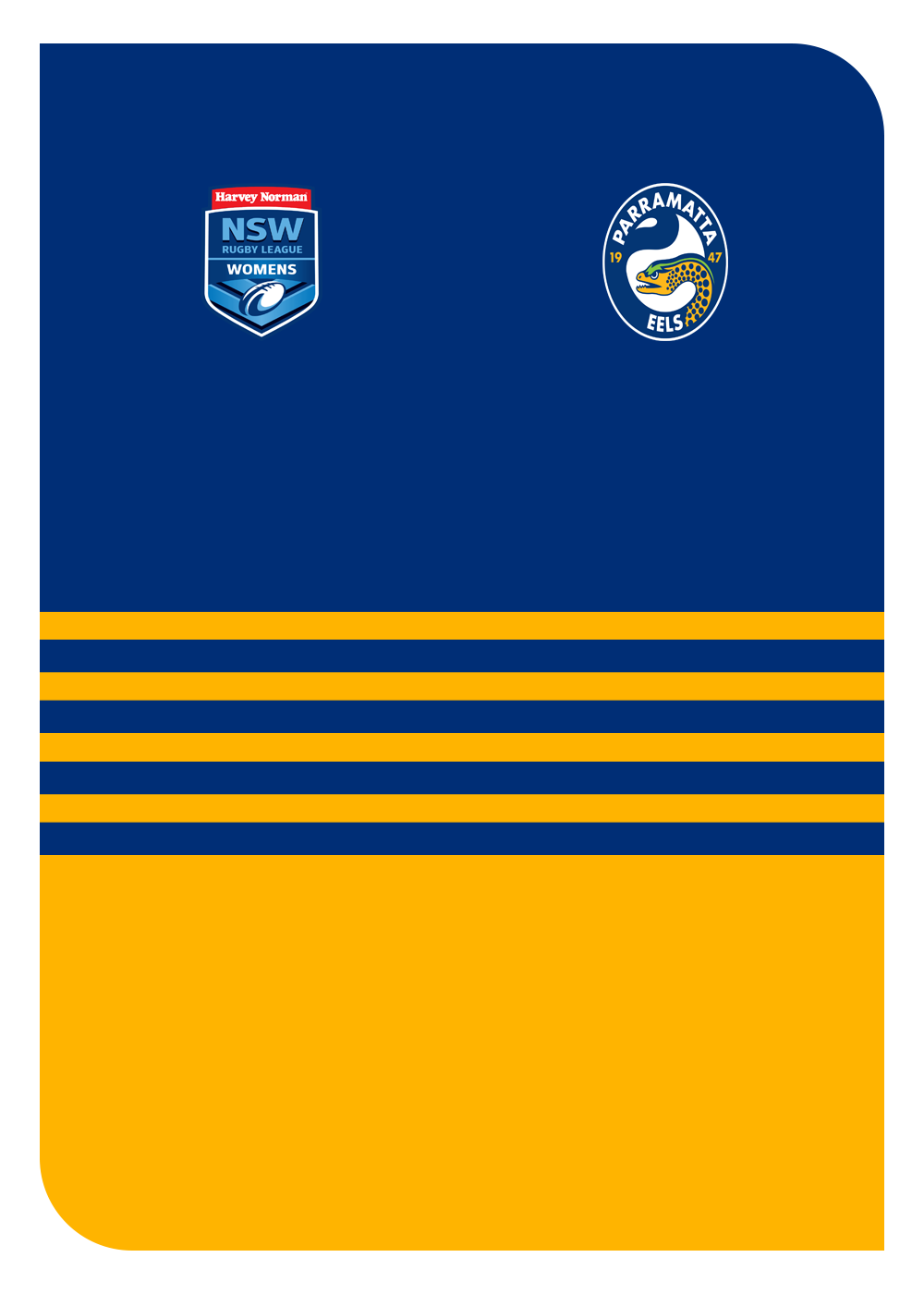
Parramatta; Eels Ground: TBA City/Suburb: Sydney Coach: TBA Affiliate: Parramatta Eels

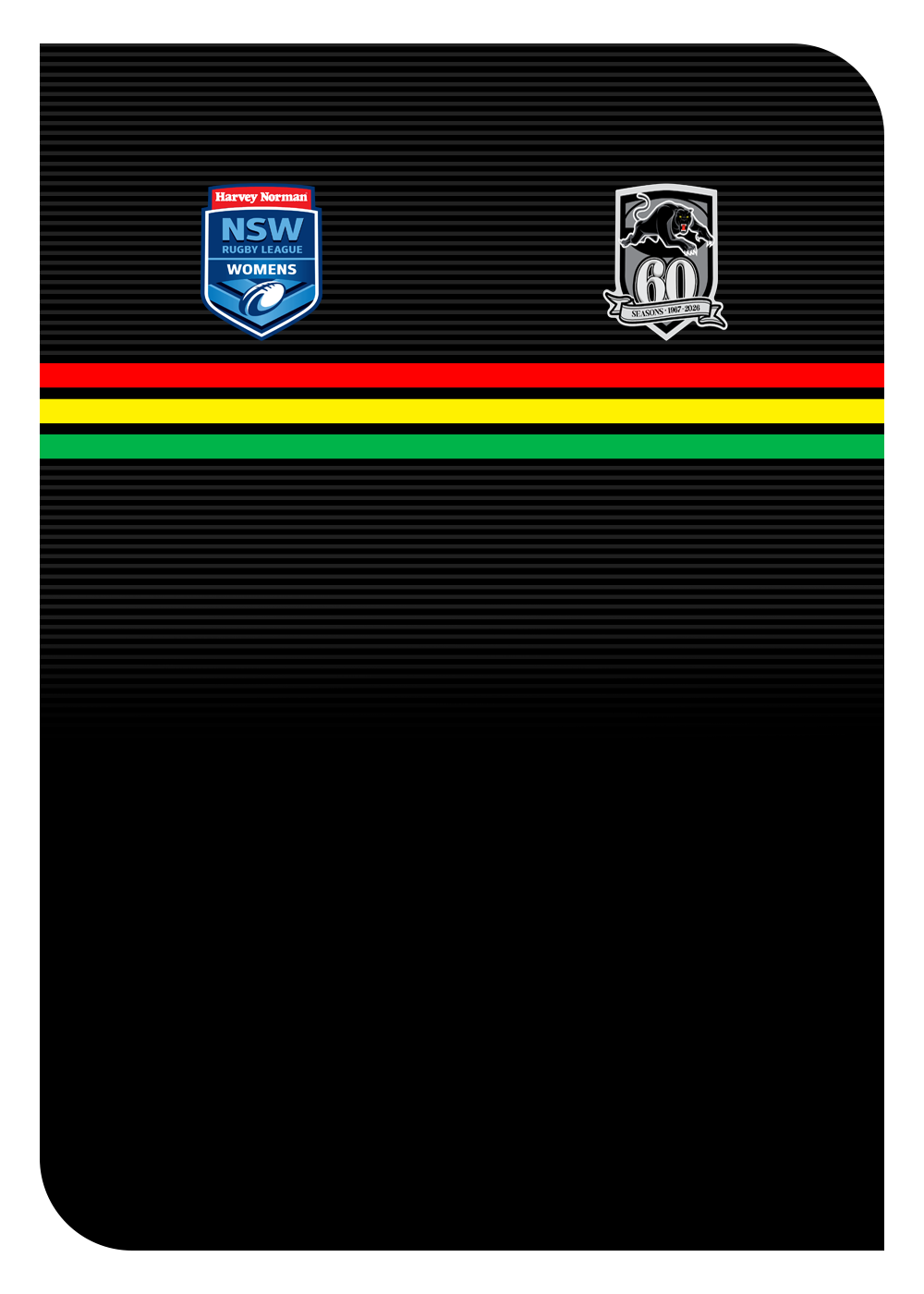
Penrith; Panthers Ground: TBA City/Suburb: Sydney Coach: TBA Affiliate: N/A

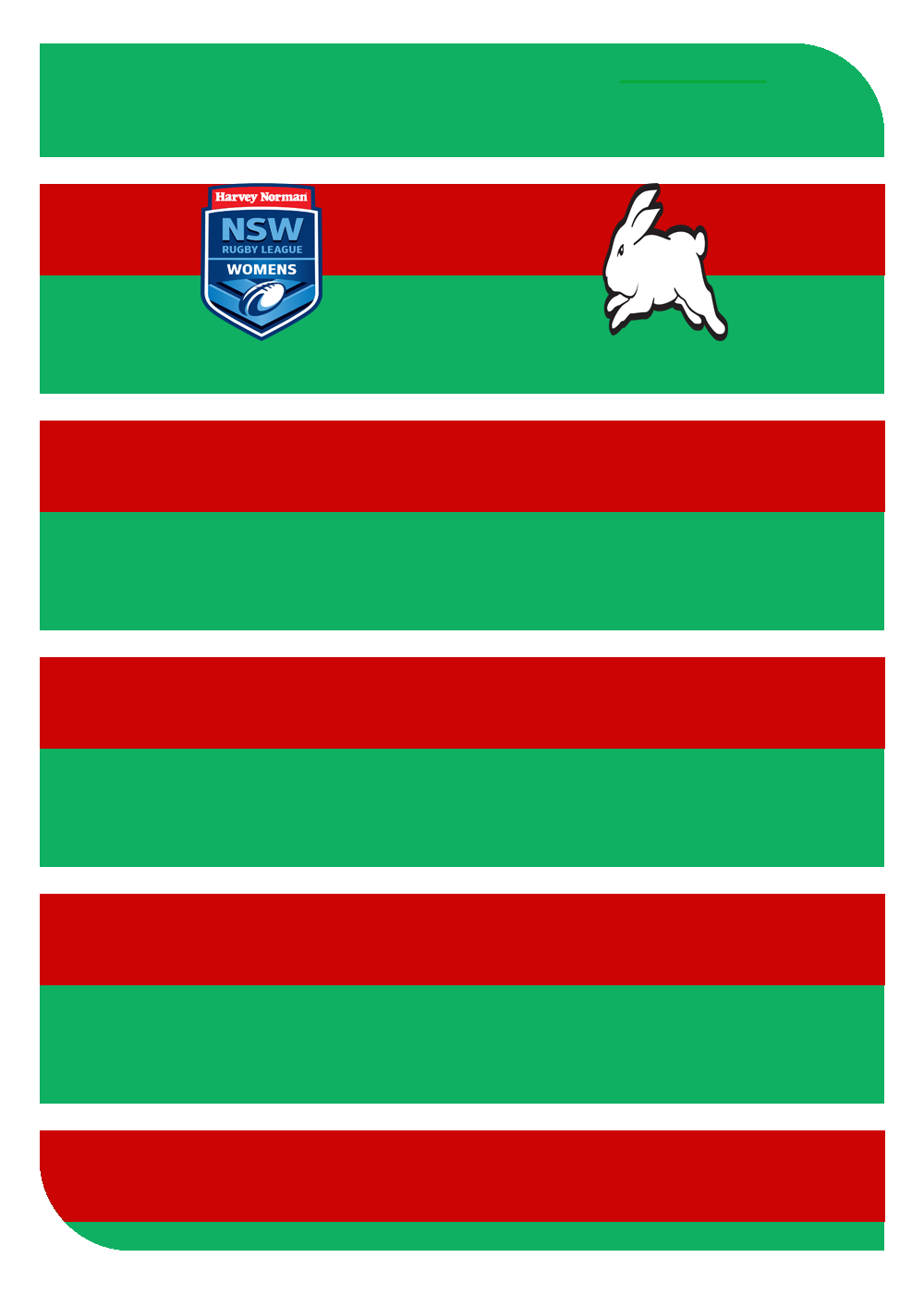
South Sydney; Rabbitohs Ground: Redfern Oval City/Suburb: Sydney (Redfern) Coach: TBA Affiliate: New Zealand Warriors

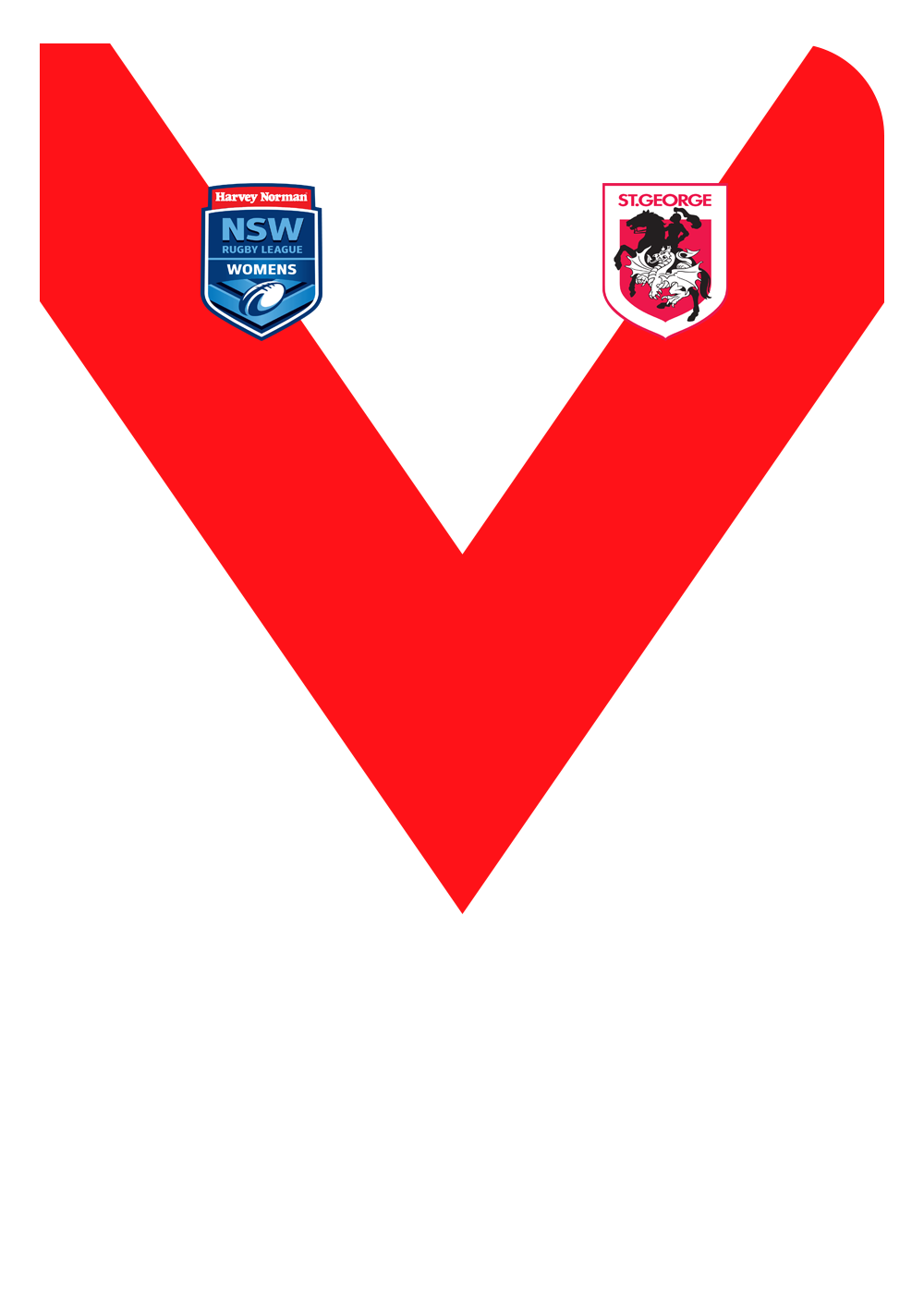
St George; Dragons Ground: Jubilee Stadium City/Suburb: Sydney (Kogarah) Coach: TBA Affiliate: St George Illawarra Dragons

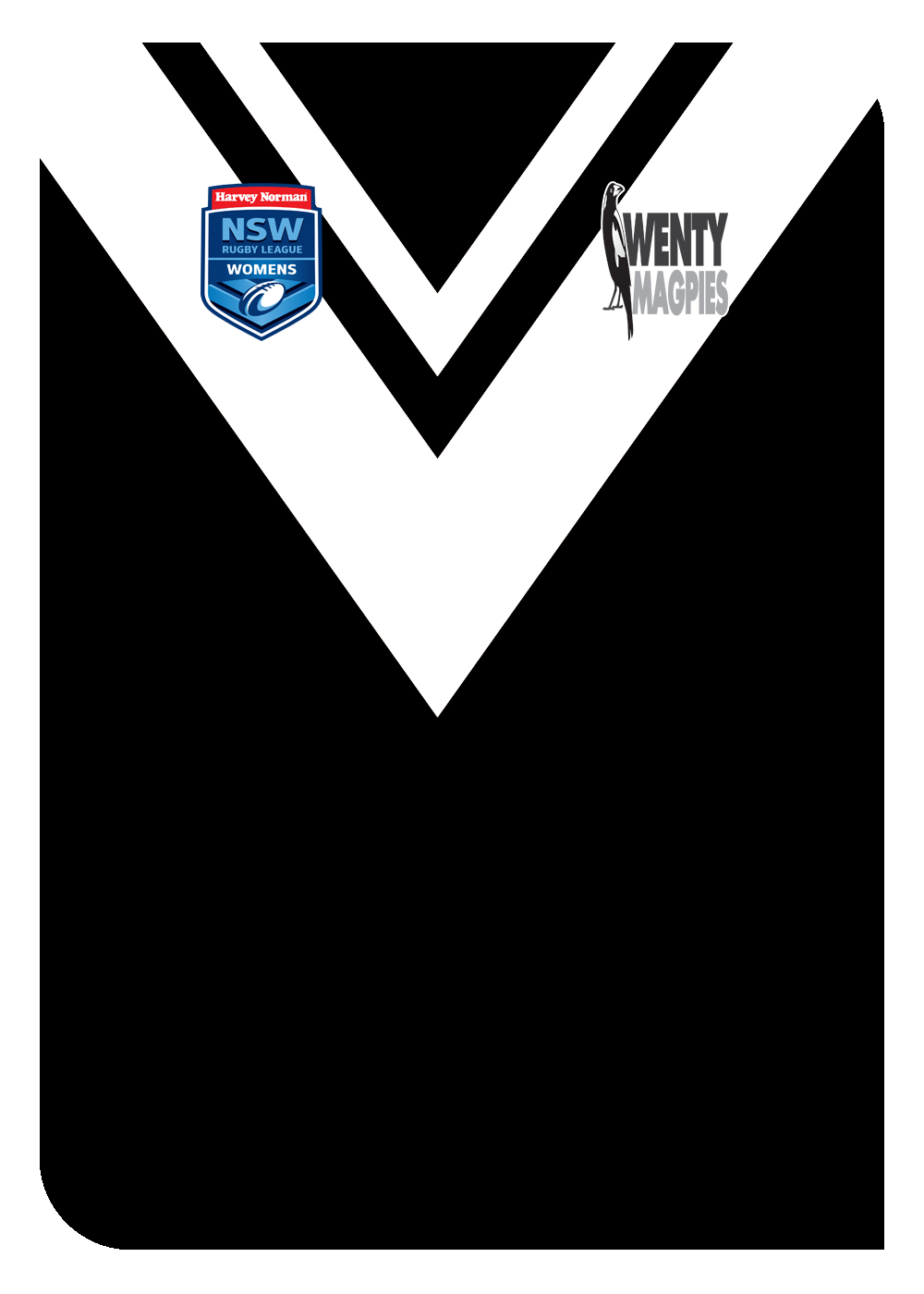
Wentworthville; Magpies Ground: Ringrose Park City/Suburb: Sydney (Wentworthville) Coach: Renee Targett Affiliate: Parramatta Eels

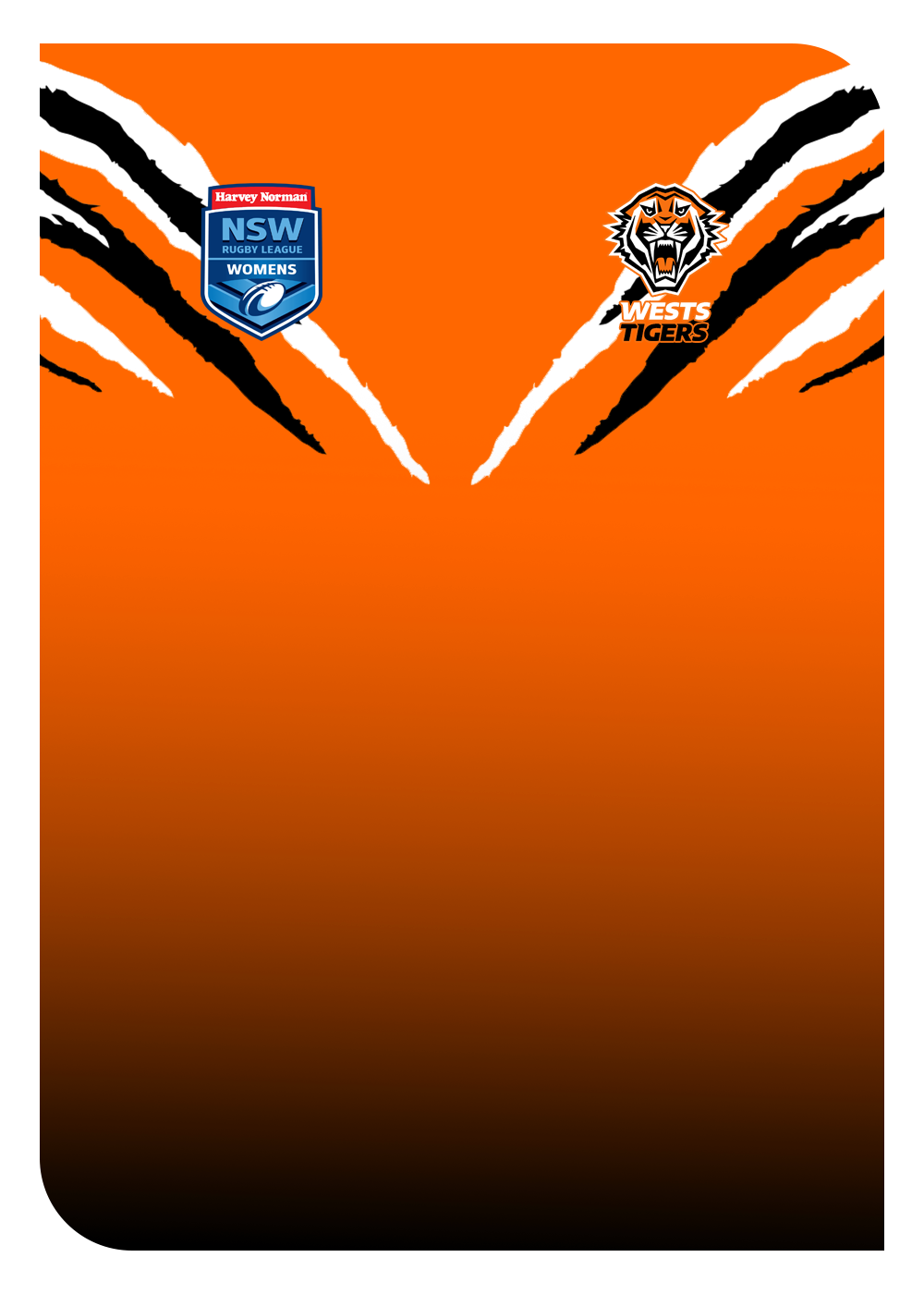
Wests Tigers; Tigers Ground: Lidcombe Oval City/Suburb: Sydney (Lidcombe) Coach: TBA Affiliate: Wests Tigers

==== Ladder ====
Pos	Team	Pld	W	D	L	B	PF	PA	PD	Pts	Qualification
1	Canterbury-Bankstown Bulldogs (WR)	0	0	0	0	0	0	0	0	0	Minor Premiers & Major Semi-Final
2	Central Coast Roosters (W)	0	0	0	0	0	0	0	0	0	Qualifying Final
3	Cronulla-Sutherland Sharks (WR)	0	0	0	0	0	0	0	0	0	Qualifying Final
4	Illawarra Steelers (W)	0	0	0	0	0	0	0	0	0	Elimination Final
5	Mount Pritchard Mounties (W)	0	0	0	0	0	0	0	0	0	Elimination Final
6	Newcastle Knights (WR)	0	0	0	0	0	0	0	0	0	
7	Parramatta Eels (WR)	0	0	0	0	0	0	0	0	0	
8	Penrith Panthers (W)	0	0	0	0	0	0	0	0	0	
9	South Sydney Rabbitohs (W)	0	0	0	0	0	0	0	0	0	
10	St George Dragons (W)	0	0	0	0	0	0	0	0	0	
11	Wentworthville Magpies (W)	0	0	0	0	0	0	0	0	0	
12	Wests Tigers (WR)	0	0	0	0	0	0	0	0	0	

Updated to match(es) played on 1 September. Source:
Rules for classification: 1) points; 2) point difference; 3) points scored

===== Ladder progression =====
- Numbers highlighted in green indicate that the team finished the round inside the top 5.
- Numbers highlighted in blue indicates the team finished first on the ladder in that round.
- Numbers highlighted in red indicates the team finished last place on the ladder in that round.
- Underlined numbers indicate that the team had a bye during that round.

Pos	Team	1	2	3	4	5	6	7	8	9	10	11
1	Canterbury-Bankstown Bulldogs (WR)											
2	Central Coast Roosters (W)											
3	Cronulla-Sutherland Sharks (WR)											
4	Illawarra Steelers (W)											
5	Mount Pritchard Mounties (W)											
6	Newcastle Knights (WR)											
7	Parramatta Eels (WR)											
8	Penrith Panthers (W)											
9	South Sydney Rabbitohs (W)											
10	St George Dragons (W)											
11	Wentworthville Magpies (W)											
12	Wests Tigers (WR)											

Season Results:

Home	Score	Away	Match Information
Home	Score	Away	Date and Time	Venue	Referee	Video
Round 1
St George Dragons (W)	V	Canterbury-Bankstown Bulldogs (WR)	Saturday, 13 June, 1:00pm	Jubilee Stadium	TBA
Wentworthville Magpies (W)	V	Illawarra Steelers (W)	Saturday, 13 June, 4:00pm	Ringrose Park	TBA
Cronulla-Sutherland Sharks (WR)	V	South Sydney Rabbitohs (W)	Saturday, 13 June, TBA	TBA	TBA
Wests Tigers (WR)	V	Central Coast Roosters (W)	Saturday, 13 June, TBA	Lidcombe Oval	TBA
Penrith Panthers (W)	V	Newcastle Knights (WR)	Saturday, 13 June, TBA	TBA	TBA
Parramatta Eels (WR)	V	Mount Pritchard Mounties (W)	Saturday, 13 June, TBA	TBA	TBA
Round 2
South Sydney Rabbitohs (W)	V	Wentworthville Magpies (W)	Saturday, 20 June, 10:00am	Redfern Oval	TBA
Central Coast Roosters (W)	V	Parramatta Eels (WR)	Saturday, 20 June, 10:00am	Woy Woy Oval	TBA
Canterbury-Bankstown Bulldogs (WR)	V	Penrith Panthers (W)	Saturday, 20 June, 11:00am	Hammondville Oval	TBA
St George Dragons (W)	V	Illawarra Steelers (W)	Saturday, 20 June, 1:00pm	Jubilee Stadium	TBA
Mount Pritchard Mounties (W)	V	Cronulla-Sutherland Sharks (WR)	Saturday, 20 June, 1:00pm	Aubrey Keech Reserve	TBA
Newcastle Knights (WR)	V	Wests Tigers (WR)	Saturday, 20 June, TBA	TBA	TBA
Round 3
Wests Tigers (WR)	V	South Sydney Rabbitohs (W)	Saturday, 27 June, 2:00pm	Lidcombe Oval	TBA
Illawarra Steelers (W)	V	Cronulla-Sutherland Sharks (WR)	Saturday, 27 June, 3:00pm	Collegians Sports Stadium	TBA
St George Dragons (W)	V	Penrith Panthers (W)	Saturday, 27 June, 3:30pm	Jubilee Stadium	TBA
Mount Pritchard Mounties (W)	V	Newcastle Knights (WR)	Saturday, 27 June, 5:00pm	Aubrey Keech Reserve	TBA
Parramatta Eels (WR)	V	Canterbury-Bankstown Bulldogs (WR)	Saturday, 27 June, TBA	TBA	TBA
Central Coast Roosters (W)	V	Wentworthville Magpies (W)	Sunday, 28 June, 10:00am	Woy Woy Oval	TBA
Round 4
Central Coast Roosters (W)	V	St George Dragons (W)	Saturday, 4 July, 10:00am	Woy Woy Oval	TBA
Mount Pritchard Mounties (W)	V	Illawarra Steelers (W)	Saturday, 4 July, 5:00pm	Aubrey Keech Reserve	TBA
Cronulla-Sutherland Sharks (WR)	V	Newcastle Knights (WR)	Saturday, 4 July, TBA	TBA	TBA
Parramatta Eels (WR)	V	Wests Tigers (WR)	Saturday, 4 July, TBA	TBA	TBA
Penrith Panthers (W)	V	South Sydney Rabbitohs (W)	Saturday, 4 July, TBA	TBA	TBA
Wentworthville Magpies (W)	V	Canterbury-Bankstown Bulldogs (WR)	Sunday, 5 July, 11:15am	Ringrose Park	TBA
Round 5
South Sydney Rabbitohs (W)	V	Newcastle Knights (WR)	Saturday, 11 July, 10:00am	Redfern Oval	TBA
Canterbury-Bankstown Bulldogs (WR)	V	Mount Pritchard Mounties (W)	Saturday, 11 July, 11:00am	Hammondville Oval	TBA
St George Dragons (W)	V	Wests Tigers (WR)	Saturday, 11 July, 1:00pm	Jubilee Stadium	TBA
Penrith Panthers (W)	V	Wentworthville Magpies (W)	Saturday, 11 July, TBA	TBA	TBA
Cronulla-Sutherland Sharks (WR)	V	Central Coast Roosters (W)	Saturday, 11 July, TBA	TBA	TBA
Illawarra Steelers (W)	V	Parramatta Eels (WR)	Sunday, 12 July, 12:00pm	WIN Stadium	TBA
Round 6
Canterbury-Bankstown Bulldogs (WR)	V	Cronulla-Sutherland Sharks (WR)	Saturday, 18 July, 11:00am	Hammondville Oval	TBA
Illawarra Steelers (W)	V	South Sydney Rabbitohs (W)	Saturday, 18 July, 3:00pm	Collegians Sports Stadium	TBA
Newcastle Knights (WR)	V	St George Dragons (W)	Saturday, 18 July, TBA	TBA	TBA
Penrith Panthers (W)	V	Wests Tigers (WR)	Saturday, 18 July, TBA	TBA	TBA
Central Coast Roosters (W)	V	Mount Pritchard Mounties (W)	Sunday, 19 July, 10:00am	Woy Woy Oval	TBA
Wentworthville Magpies (W)	V	Parramatta Eels (WR)	Sunday, 19 July, 11:15am	Ringrose Park	TBA
Round 7
South Sydney Rabbitohs (W)	V	Mount Pritchard Mounties (W)	Saturday, 25 July, 10:00am	Redfern Oval	TBA
Canterbury-Bankstown Bulldogs (WR)	V	Illawarra Steelers (W)	Saturday, 25 July, 11:00am	Hammondville Oval	TBA
Parramatta Eels (WR)	V	Penrith Panthers (W)	Saturday, 25 July, TBA	TBA	TBA
Wests Tigers (WR)	V	Cronulla-Sutherland Sharks (WR)	Saturday, 25 July, TBA	TBA	TBA
Newcastle Knights (WR)	V	Central Coast Roosters (W)	Saturday, 25 July, TBA	TBA	TBA
Wentworthville Magpies (W)	V	St George Dragons (W)	Sunday, 26 July, 11:15am	Ringrose Park	TBA
Round 8
South Sydney Rabbitohs (W)	V	Parramatta Eels (WR)	Saturday, 8 August, 10:00am	Redfern Oval	TBA
Mount Pritchard Mounties (W)	V	Penrith Panthers (W)	Saturday, 8 August, 1:00pm	Aubrey Keech Reserve	TBA
Central Coast Roosters (W)	V	Illawarra Steelers (W)	Saturday, 8 August, 3:00pm	Woy Woy Oval	TBA
Wentworthville Magpies (W)	V	Wests Tigers (WR)	Saturday, 8 August, 4:00pm	Ringrose Park	TBA
Cronulla-Sutherland Sharks (WR)	V	St George Dragons (W)	Saturday, 8 August, TBA	TBA	TBA
Newcastle Knights (WR)	V	Canterbury-Bankstown Bulldogs (WR)	Saturday, 8 August, TBA	TBA	TBA
Round 9
Canterbury-Bankstown Bulldogs (WR)	V	South Sydney Rabbitohs (W)	Saturday, 15 August, 11:00am	Hammondville Oval	TBA
St George Dragons (W)	V	Mount Pritchard Mounties (W)	Saturday, 15 August, 1:00pm	Jubilee Stadium	TBA
Illawarra Steelers (W)	V	Wests Tigers (WR)	Saturday, 15 August, 3:00pm	Collegians Sports Stadium	TBA
Cronulla-Sutherland Sharks (WR)	V	Wentworthville Magpies (W)	Saturday, 15 August, TBA	TBA	TBA
Penrith Panthers (W)	V	Central Coast Roosters (W)	Saturday, 15 August, TBA	TBA	TBA
Parramatta Eels (WR)	V	Newcastle Knights (WR)	Saturday, 15 August, TBA	TBA	TBA
Round 10
Wests Tigers (WR)	V	Mount Pritchard Mounties (W)	Saturday, 22 August, 12:00pm	Lidcombe Oval	TBA
St George Dragons (W)	V	South Sydney Rabbitohs (W)	Saturday, 22 August, 1:00pm	Jubilee Stadium	TBA
Canterbury-Bankstown Bulldogs (WR)	V	Central Coast Roosters (W)	Saturday, 22 August, 1:15pm	Belmore Sports Ground	TBA
Illawarra Steelers (W)	V	Penrith Panthers (W)	Saturday, 22 August, 3:00pm	Collegians Sports Stadium	TBA
Newcastle Knights (WR)	V	Wentworthville Magpies (W)	Saturday, 22 August, TBA	TBA	TBA
Cronulla-Sutherland Sharks (WR)	V	Parramatta Eels (WR)	Saturday, 22 August, TBA	TBA	TBA
Round 11
South Sydney Rabbitohs (W)	V	Central Coast Roosters (W)	Saturday, 29 August, 10:00am	Redfern Oval	TBA
Mount Pritchard Mounties (W)	V	Wentworthville Magpies (W)	Saturday, 29 August, 1:00pm	Aubrey Keech Reserve	TBA
Newcastle Knights (WR)	V	Illawarra Steelers (W)	Saturday, 29 August, TBA	TBA	TBA
Parramatta Eels (WR)	V	St George Dragons (W)	Saturday, 29 August, TBA	TBA	TBA
Penrith Panthers (W)	V	Cronulla-Sutherland Sharks (WR)	Saturday, 29 August, TBA	TBA	TBA
Wests Tigers (WR)	V	Canterbury-Bankstown Bulldogs (WR)	Saturday, 29 August, TBA	TBA	TBA
Finals Series
Qualifying & Elimination Finals
2nd Place	V	3rd Place	5/6 September	TBA	TBA
4th Place	V	5th Place	5/6 September	TBA	TBA
Semi-Finals
1st Place	V	QF Winner	12/13 September	TBA	TBA
QF Loser	V	EF Winner	12/13 September	TBA	TBA
Preliminary Final
Major SF Loser	V	Minor SF Winner	19/20 September	TBA	TBA
Grand Final
Major SF Winner	V	PF Winner	26/27 September	TBA	TBA

==== Grand Final ====
Qualifying & Elimination Finals
2
3
4
5

Major Semi-Final
1
2/3
Minor Semi-Final
2/3
4/5

Preliminary Final
1/2/3
2/3/4/5

Grand Final
1/2/3
1/2/3/4/5

2026 New South Wales Women's Premiership Grand Final

26/27 September 2026
TBA

Major SF Winner	v	PF Winner

TBA

== Tier 2 Open Age Competitions ==
=== Ron Massey Cup ===
2026 Leagues Club Australia Ron Massey Cup
- Duration: 21 March – 5/6 September 2026
- Teams: 10

The Ron Massey Cup (named the Leagues Club Australia Ron Massey Cup for sponsorship reasons) is a semi-professional open-age competition administered by the NSWRL. It sits below the Knock-On Effect NSW Cup in the state's senior pathway structure and features clubs from across metropolitan Sydney and surrounding regions. The competition provides opportunities for players, coaches and match officials who are close to, or returning from, higher levels to remain in a high-standard environment.

==== Teams ====
- The 2026 will feature 10 teams, 1 up from the 9 that competed in 2025. Following their 2025 Sydney Shield premiership, Manly Leagues opted to join the Ron Massey Cup for 2026.
- Ryde-Eastwood Hawks – with the sale of TG Millner Oval, Ryde-Eastwood will play home games at Lidcombe Oval.

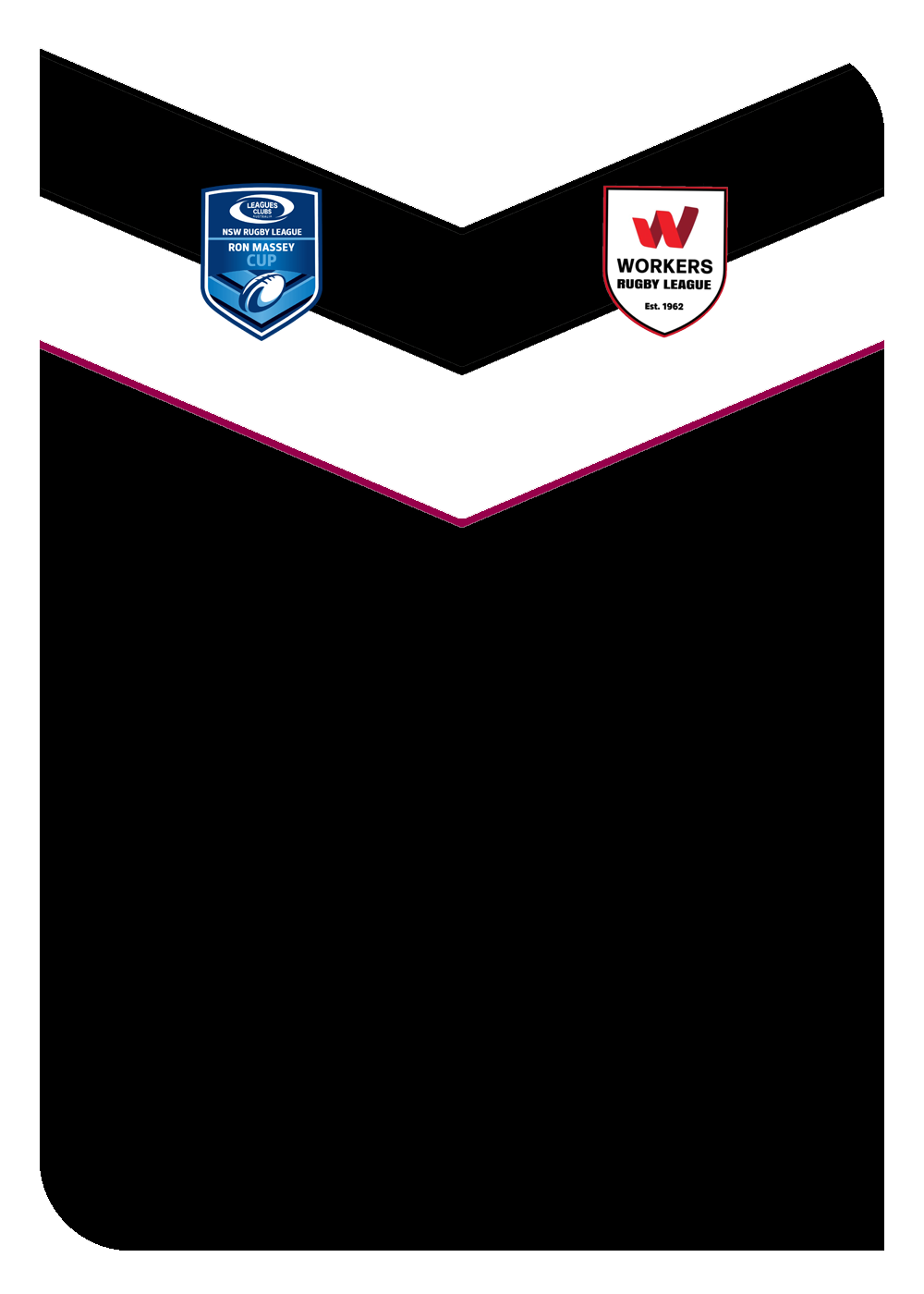
Blacktown Workers Ground: HE Laybutt Sporting Complex City/Suburb: Sydney (Blacktown) Coach: Ronny Palumbo

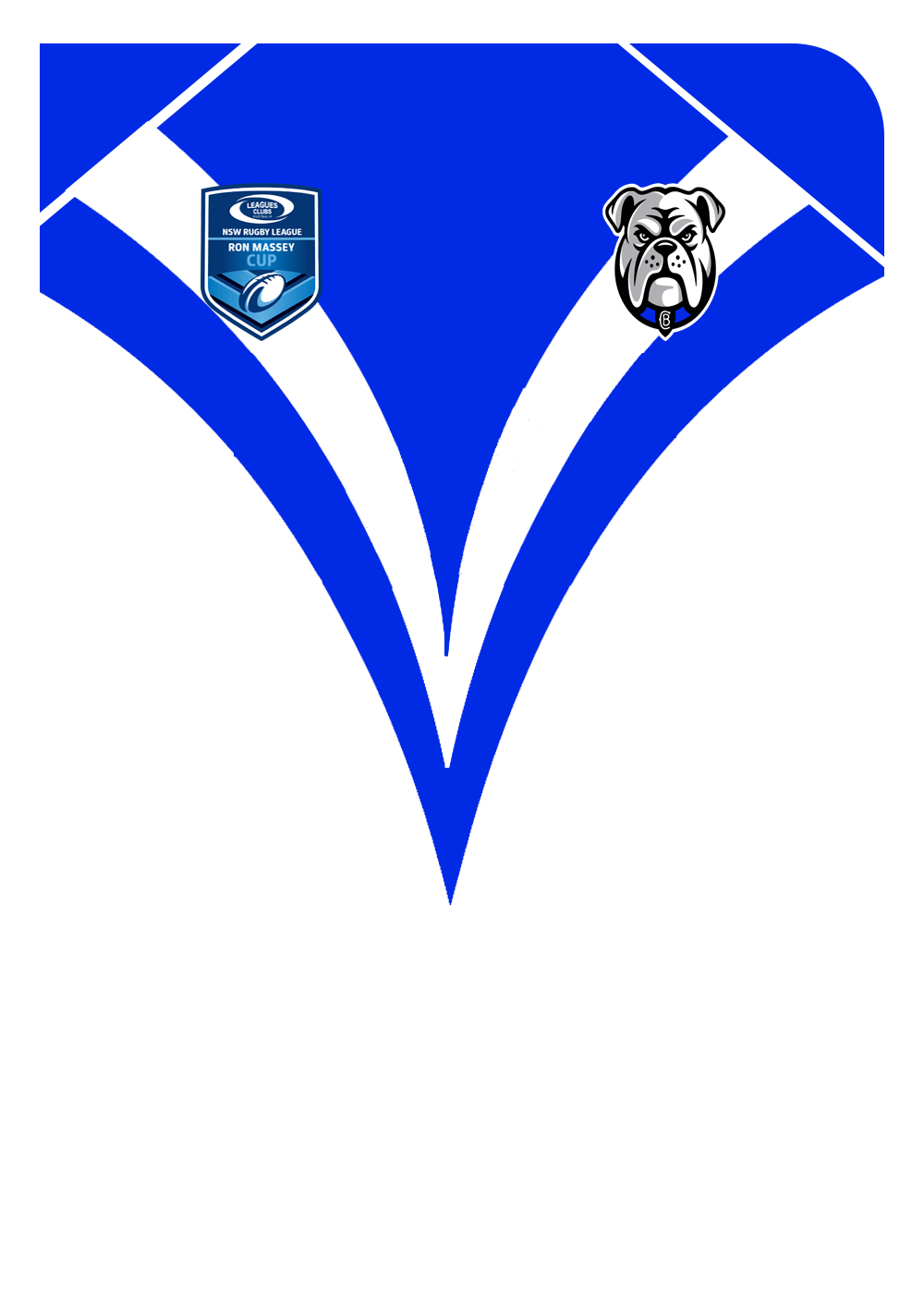
Canterbury-Bankstown Bulldogs Ground: Hammondville Oval City/Suburb: Sydney (Hammondville) Coach: TBA

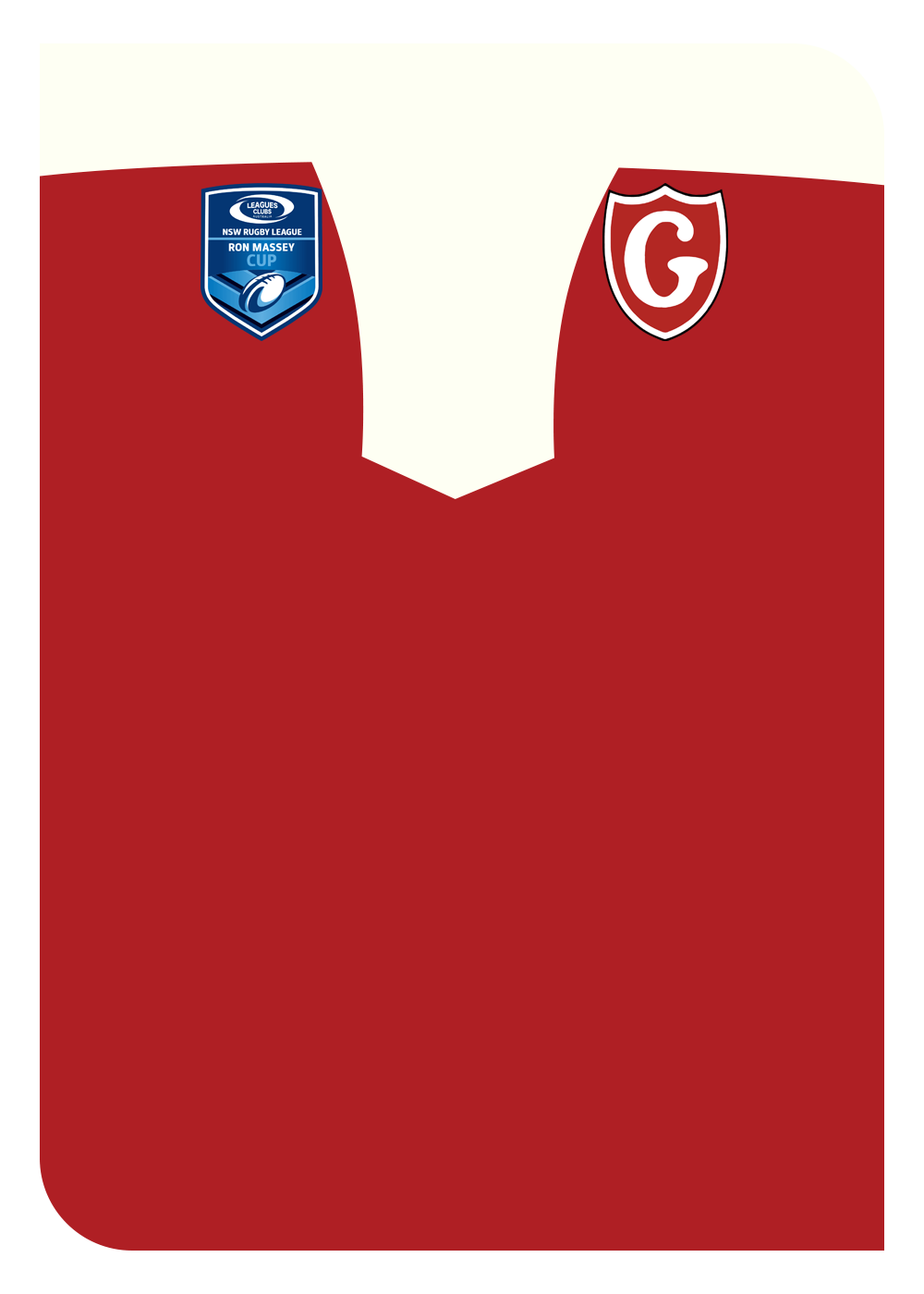
Glebe Dirty Reds Ground: Wentworth Park City/Suburb: Sydney (Glebe) Coach: TBA

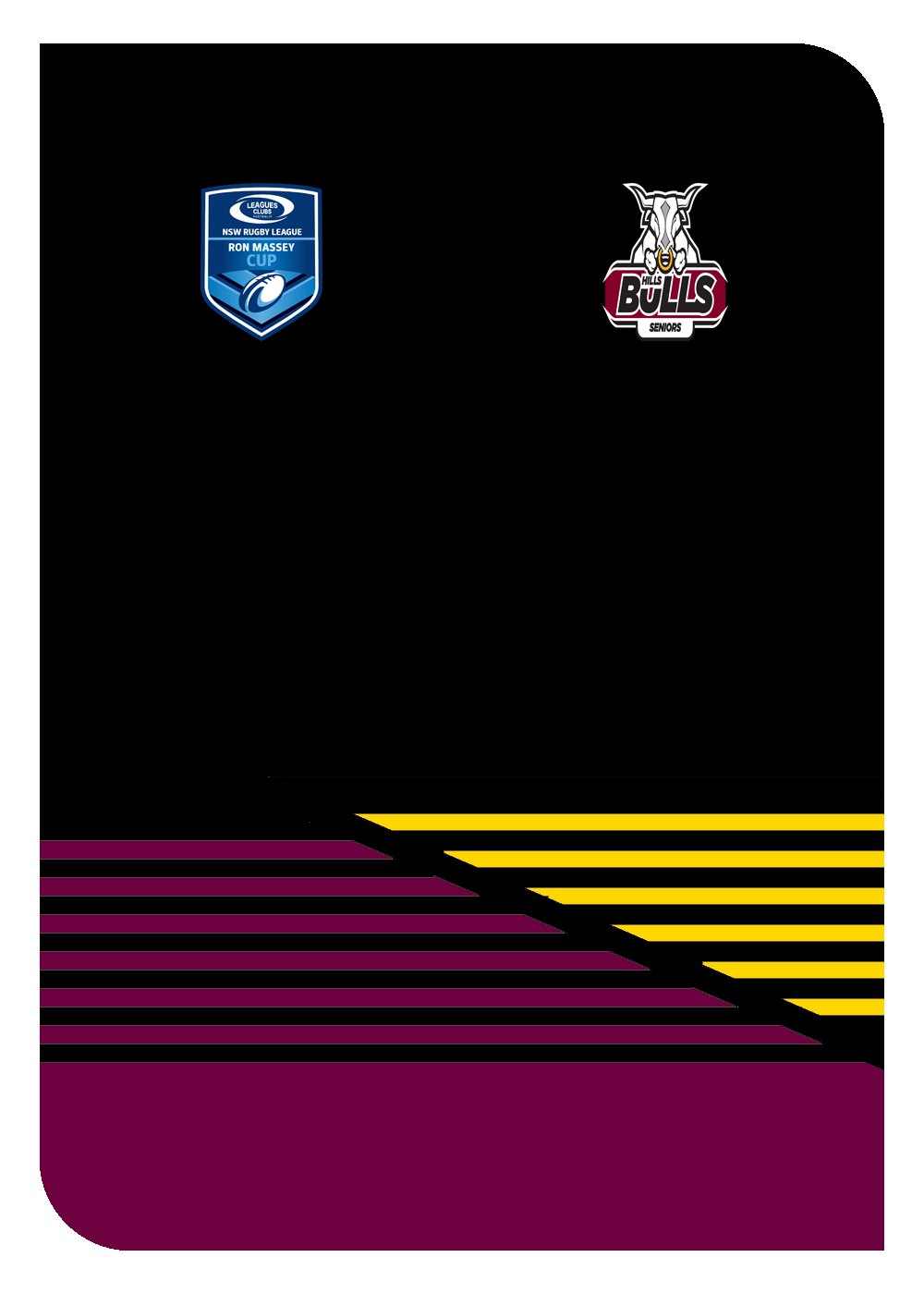
Hills District Bulls Ground: Crestwood Reserve City/Suburb: Sydney (Baulkham Hills) Coach: TBA

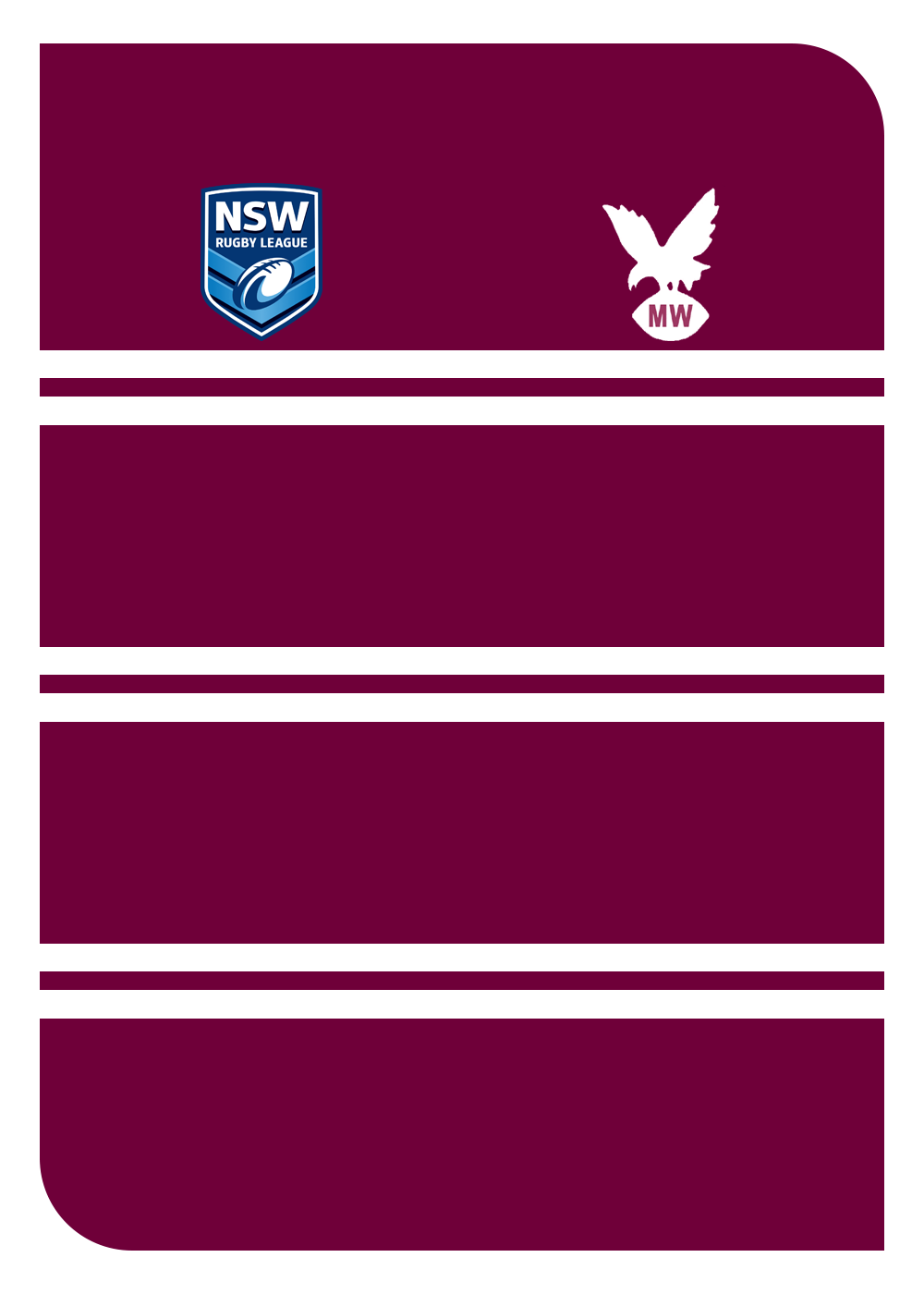
Manly Leagues Grounds: Sydney Academy of Sport City/Suburb: Sydney (Narrabeen) Head coach: TBA

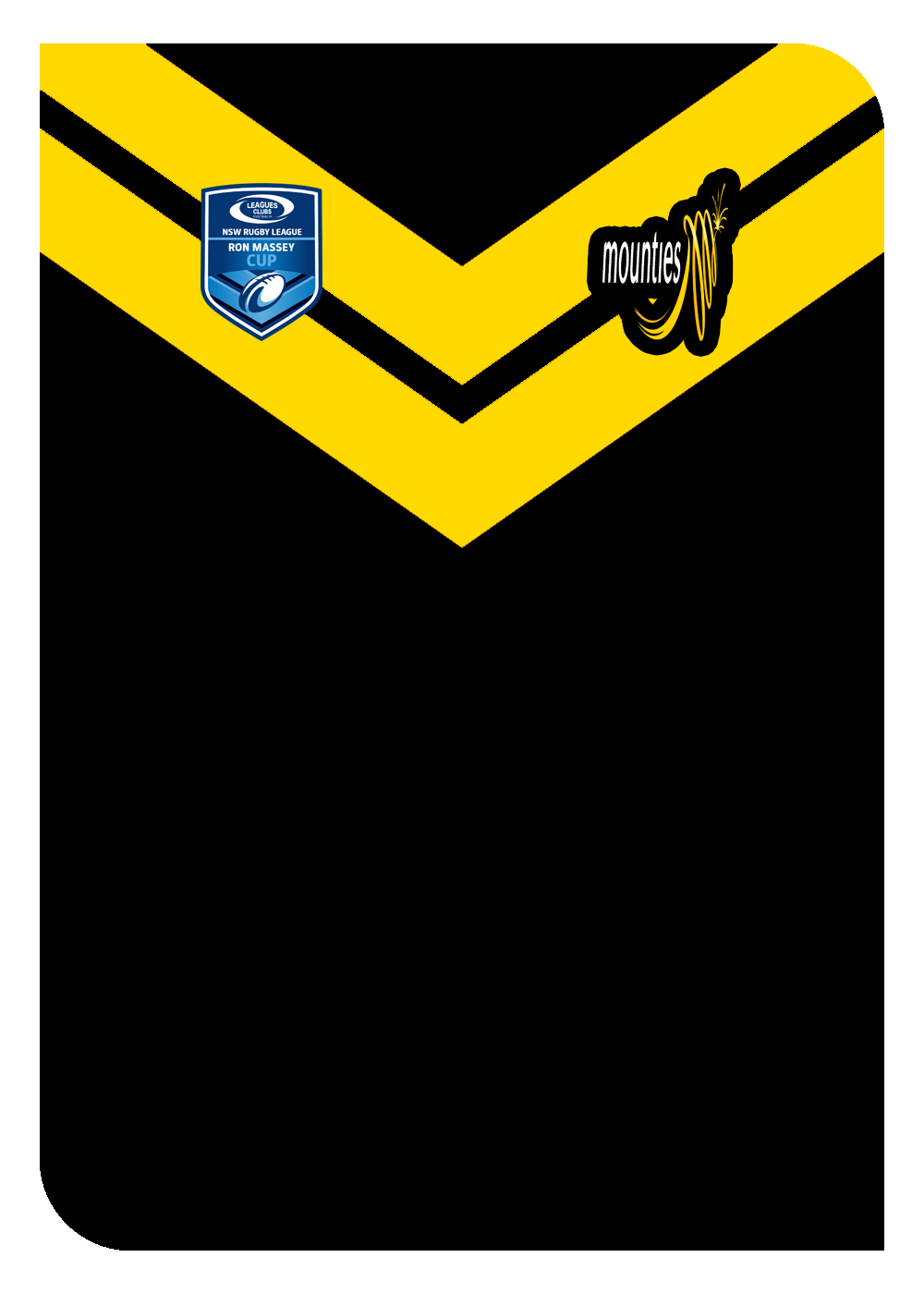
Mount Pritchard Mounties Ground: Aubrey Keech Reserve City/Suburb: Sydney (Hinchinbrook) Coach: TBA

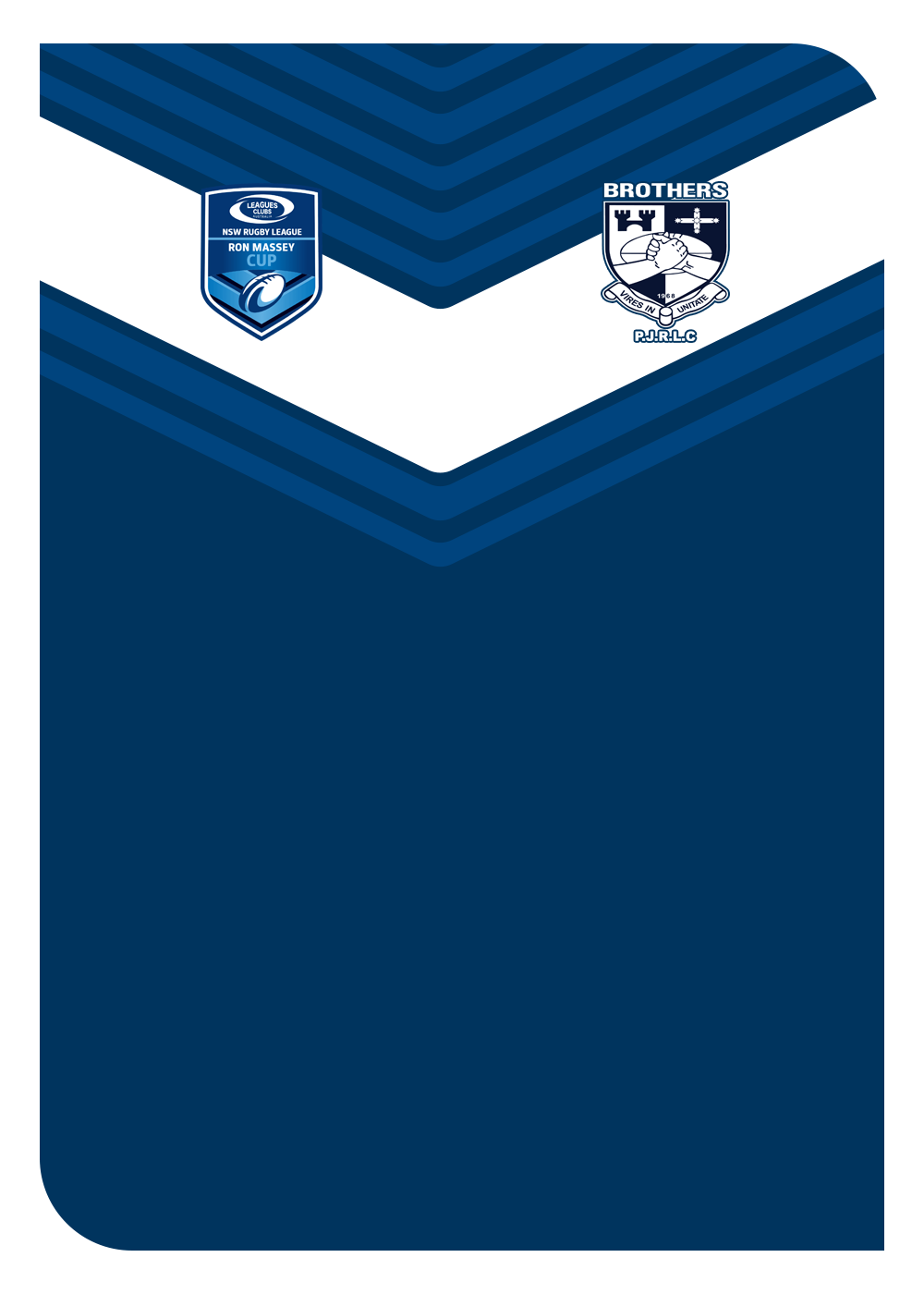
Penrith Brothers Ground: Parker Street Reserve City/Suburb: Sydney (Penrith) Coach: Jake Foster

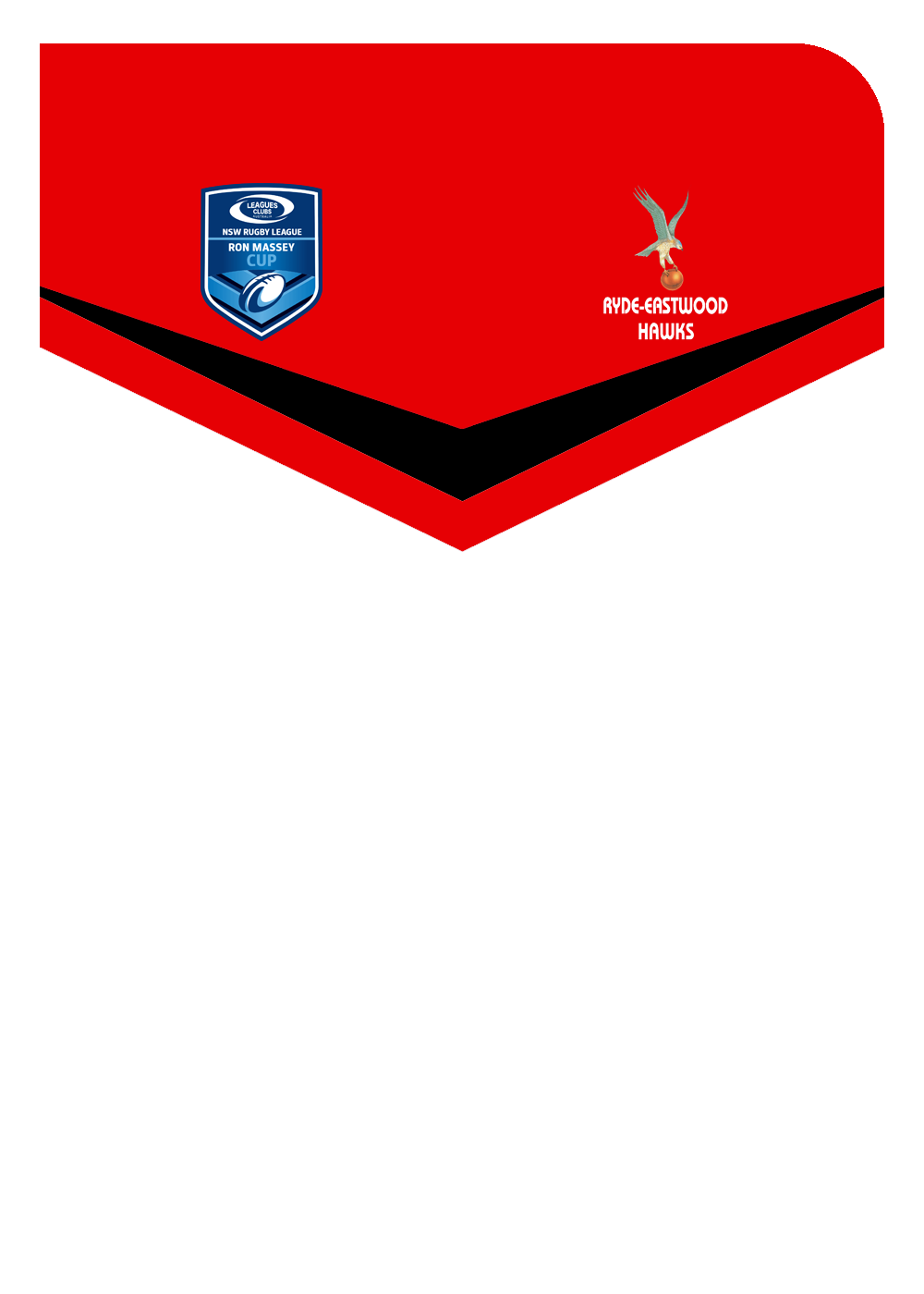
Ryde-Eastwood Hawks Ground: Lidcombe Oval City/Suburb: Sydney (Marsfield) Coach: TBA

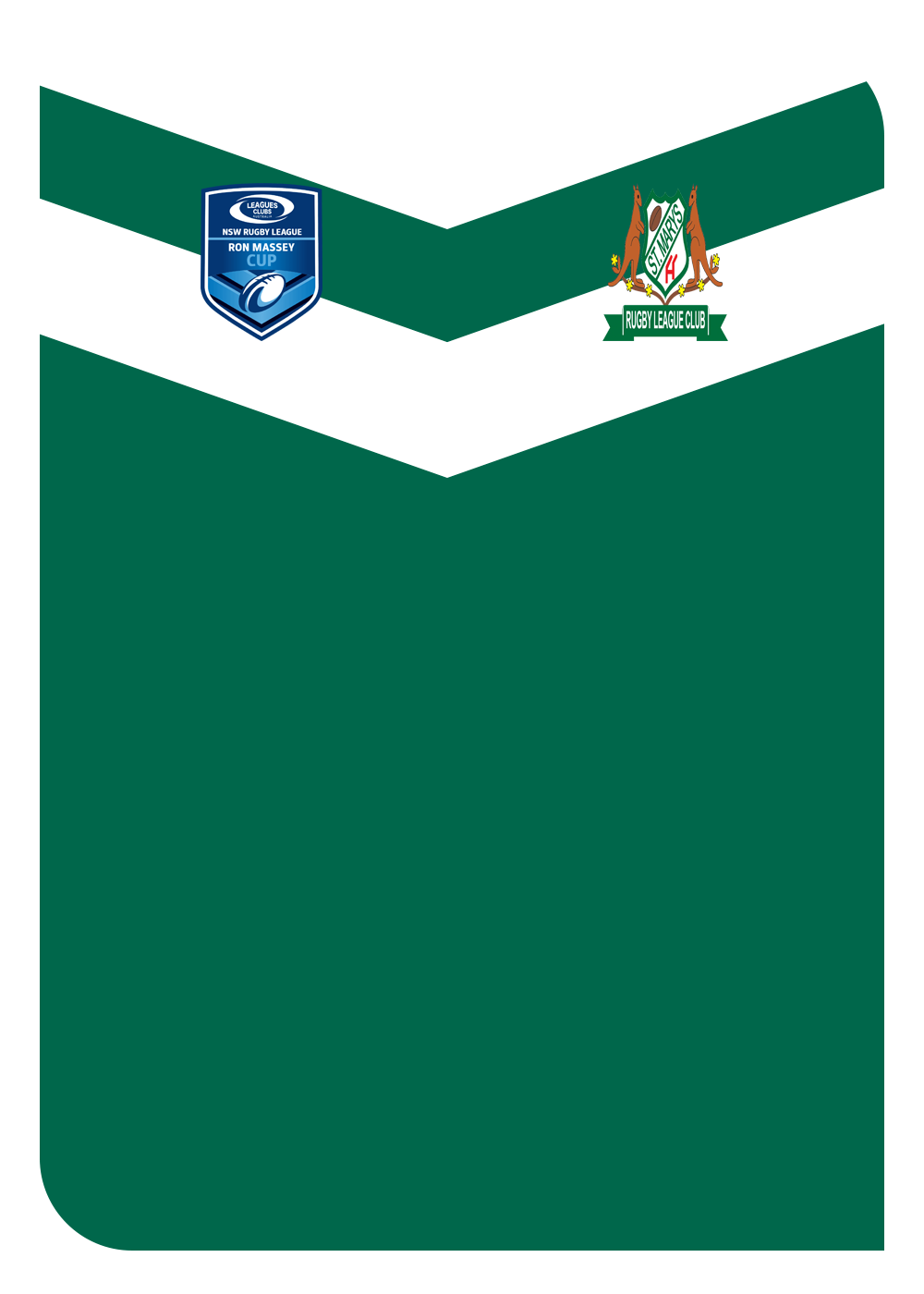
St Marys Saints Ground: St Marys Leagues Stadium City/Suburb: Sydney (St Marys) Coach: Glenn Jones

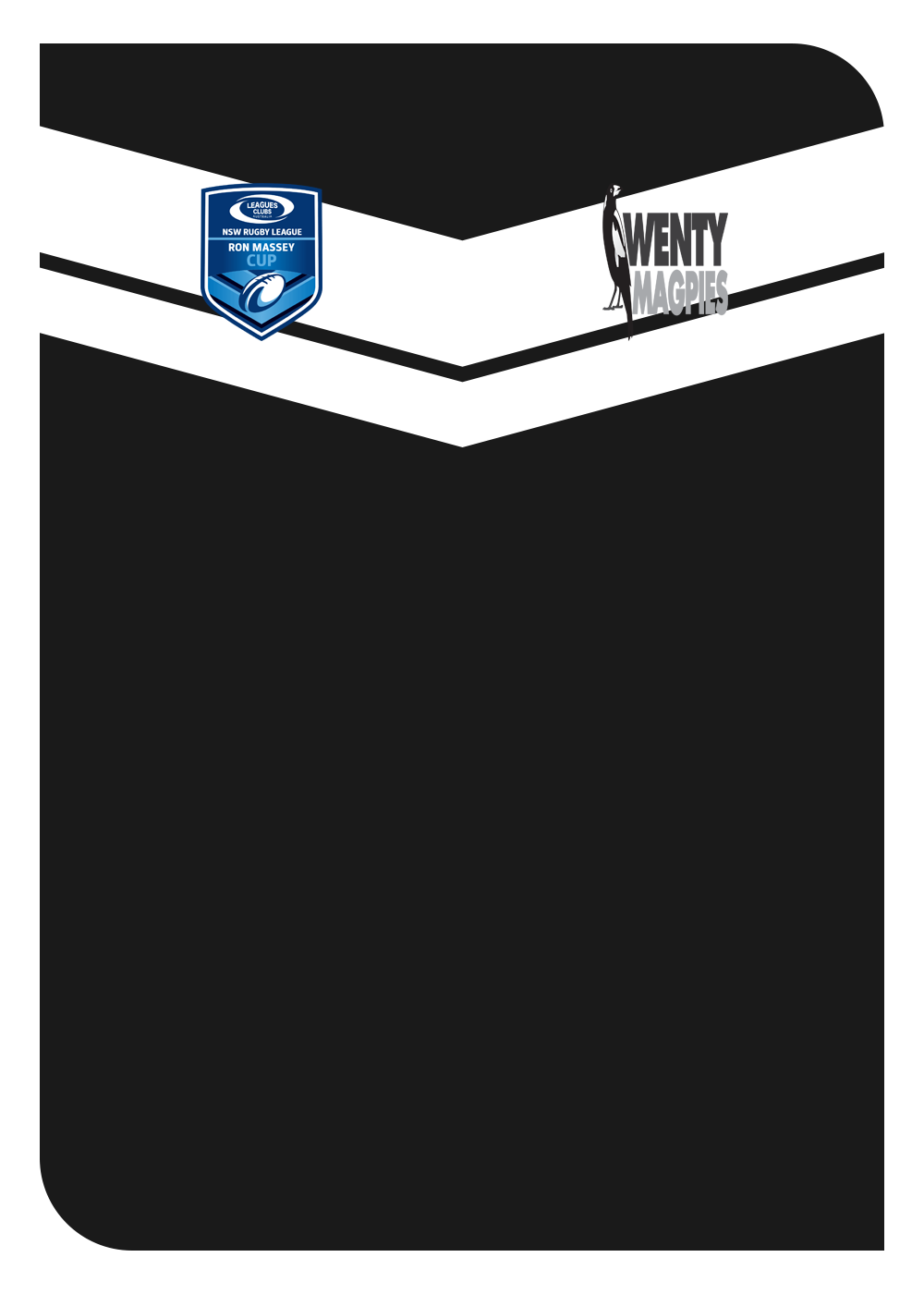
Wentworthville Magpies Ground: Ringrose Park City/Suburb: Sydney (Wentworthville) Coach: Nathan Carr

==== Ladder ====
Pos	Team	Pld	W	D	L	B	PF	PA	PD	Pts	Qualification
1	Mount Pritchard Mounties	2	2	0	0	0	64	32	+32	4	Minor Premiers & Major Semi-Final
2	St Marys Saints	2	2	0	0	0	60	30	+30	4	Qualifying Final
3	Ryde-Eastwood Hawks	2	2	0	0	0	66	56	+10	4	Qualifying Final
4	Blacktown Workers	2	1	0	1	0	58	46	+12	2	Elimination Final
5	Penrith Brothers	2	1	0	1	0	38	30	+8	2	Elimination Final
6	Wentworthville Magpies	2	1	0	1	0	46	44	+2	2	
7	Glebe Dirty Reds	2	1	0	1	0	42	46	–4	2	
8	Hills District Bulls	2	0	0	2	0	42	50	–8	0	
9	Canterbury-Bankstown Bulldogs (C)	2	0	0	2	0	28	56	–28	0	
10	Manly Leagues	2	0	0	2	0	10	64	–54	0	

Updated to match(es) played on 1 September. Source:
Rules for classification: 1) points; 2) point difference; 3) points scored

===== Ladder progression =====
- Numbers highlighted in green indicate that the team finished the round inside the top 5.
- Numbers highlighted in blue indicates the team finished first on the ladder in that round.
- Numbers highlighted in red indicates the team finished last place on the ladder in that round.
- Underlined numbers indicate that the team had a bye during that round.

Pos	Team	1	2	3	4	5	6	7	8	9	10	11	12	13	14	15	16	17	18
1	Mount Pritchard Mounties	2	4																
2	St Marys Saints	2	4																
3	Ryde-Eastwood Hawks	2	4																
4	Blacktown Workers	0	2																
5	Penrith Brothers	0	2																
6	Wentworthville Magpies	2	2																
7	Glebe Dirty Reds	2	2																
8	Hills District Bulls	0	0																
9	Canterbury-Bankstown Bulldogs (C)	0	0																
10	Manly Leagues	0	0																

Season Results:

Home	Score	Away	Match Information
Home	Score	Away	Date and Time	Venue	Referee	Video
Round 1
Ryde-Eastwood Hawks	36 – 28	Blacktown Workers	Saturday, 21 March, 5:00pm	Lidcombe Oval	Michael Ford
Mount Pritchard Mounties	26 – 18	Canterbury-Bankstown Bulldogs (C)	Saturday, 21 March, 5:00pm	Aubrey Keech Reserve	Brayden Hunt
St Marys Saints	20 – 14	Hills District Bulls	Saturday, 21 March, 5:30pm	St Marys Leagues Stadium	Martin Jones
Wentworthville Magpies	32 – 6	Manly Leagues	Saturday, 21 March, 6:00pm	Ringrose Park	Billy Greatbatch
Glebe Dirty Reds	26 – 6	Penrith Brothers	Sunday, 22 March, 10:30am	Wentworth Park	Brendan Mani
Round 2
Ryde-Eastwood Hawks	30 – 28	Hills District Bulls	Saturday, 28 March, 2:00pm	Lidcombe Oval	Brayden Hunt
Mount Pritchard Mounties	38 – 14	Wentworthville Magpies	Saturday, 28 March, 3:00pm	Aubrey Keech Reserve	Karra-Lee Nolan
Canterbury-Bankstown Bulldogs (C)	10 – 30	Blacktown Workers	Saturday, 28 March, 4:45pm	Hammondville Oval	Brendan Mani
St Marys Saints	40 – 16	Glebe Dirty Reds	Sunday, 29 March, 3:00pm	St Marys Leagues Stadium	Daniel Luttringer
Manly Leagues	4 – 32	Penrith Brothers	Saturday, 4 April, 2:50pm	Sydney Academy of Sport	Michael Ford
Round 3
Ryde-Eastwood Hawks	V	St Marys Saints	Saturday, 11 April, 1:00pm	Lidcombe Oval	TBA
Penrith Brothers	V	Mount Pritchard Mounties	Saturday, 11 April, 5:30pm	Parker Street Reserve	TBA
Canterbury-Bankstown Bulldogs (C)	V	Manly Leagues	Saturday, 11 April, 5:45pm	Hammondville Oval	TBA
Wentworthville Magpies	V	Glebe Dirty Reds	Sunday, 12 April, 2:00pm	Ringrose Park	TBA
Hills District Bulls	V	Blacktown Workers	Sunday, 12 April, 3:00pm	Crestwood Reserve	TBA
Round 4
Glebe Dirty Reds	V	Canterbury-Bankstown Bulldogs (C)	Sunday, 19 April, 10:30am	Wentworth Park	TBA
Manly Leagues	V	Ryde-Eastwood Hawks	Sunday, 19 April, 2:00pm	Sydney Academy of Sport	TBA
Wentworthville Magpies	V	Penrith Brothers	Sunday, 19 April, 2:00pm	Ringrose Park	TBA
Blacktown Workers	V	St Marys Saints	Sunday, 19 April, 3:00pm	HE Laybutt Sporting Complex	TBA
Hills District Bulls	V	Mount Pritchard Mounties	Sunday, 19 April, 3:00pm	Crestwood Reserve	TBA
Round 5 (ANZAC Round)
Ryde-Eastwood Hawks	V	Mount Pritchard Mounties	Saturday, 25 April, TBA	TBA	TBA
Manly Leagues	V	St Marys Saints	Sunday, 26 April, 2:00pm	Sydney Academy of Sport	TBA
Wentworthville Magpies	V	Canterbury-Bankstown Bulldogs (C)	Sunday, 26 April, 2:00pm	Ringrose Park	TBA
Hills District Bulls	V	Glebe Dirty Reds	Sunday, 26 April, 3:00pm	Crestwood Reserve	TBA
Blacktown Workers	V	Penrith Brothers	Sunday, 26 April, 3:00pm	HE Laybutt Sporting Complex	TBA
Round 6
St Marys Saints	V	Wentworthville Magpies	Saturday, 2 May, 4:00pm	St Marys Leagues Stadium	TBA
Mount Pritchard Mounties	V	Manly Leagues	Saturday, 2 May, 5:00pm	Aubrey Keech Reserve	TBA
Penrith Brothers	V	Ryde-Eastwood Hawks	Saturday, 2 May, 5:30pm	Parker Street Reserve	TBA
Canterbury-Bankstown Bulldogs (C)	V	Hills District Bulls	Saturday, 2 May, 5:45pm	Hammondville Oval	TBA
Glebe Dirty Reds	V	Blacktown Workers	Sunday, 3 May, 10:30am	Wentworth Park	TBA
Round 7
Ryde-Eastwood Hawks	V	Canterbury-Bankstown Bulldogs (C)	Saturday, 9 May, 2:00pm	Lidcombe Oval	TBA
Mount Pritchard Mounties	V	Glebe Dirty Reds	Saturday, 9 May, 3:00pm	Aubrey Keech Reserve	TBA
St Marys Saints	V	Penrith Brothers	Saturday, 9 May, 4:00pm	St Marys Leagues Stadium	TBA
Manly Leagues	V	Hills District Bulls	Saturday, 9 May, 5:00pm	4 Pines Park	TBA
Blacktown Workers	V	Wentworthville Magpies	Sunday, 10 May, 3:00pm	HE Laybutt Sporting Complex	TBA
Round 8
Canterbury-Bankstown Bulldogs (C)	V	St Marys Saints	Saturday, 23 May, 5:45pm	Hammondville Oval	TBA
Glebe Dirty Reds	V	Ryde-Eastwood Hawks	Sunday, 24 May, 2:00pm	Wentworth Park	TBA
Wentworthville Magpies	V	Mount Pritchard Mounties	Sunday, 24 May, 2:00pm	Ringrose Park	TBA
Hills District Bulls	V	Penrith Brothers	Sunday, 24 May, 3:00pm	Crestwood Reserve	TBA
Blacktown Workers	V	Manly Leagues	Sunday, 24 May, 3:00pm	HE Laybutt Sporting Complex	TBA
Round 9
Mount Pritchard Mounties	V	St Marys Saints	Saturday, 30 May, 3:00pm	Aubrey Keech Reserve	TBA
Penrith Brothers	V	Canterbury-Bankstown Bulldogs (C)	Saturday, 30 May, 5:30pm	Parker Street Reserve	TBA
Blacktown Workers	V	Ryde-Eastwood Hawks	Saturday, 30 May, TBA	TBA	TBA
Manly Leagues	V	Glebe Dirty Reds	Sunday, 31 May, 2:00pm	Sydney Academy of Sport	TBA
Hills District Bulls	V	Wentworthville Magpies	Sunday, 31 May, 3:00pm	Crestwood Reserve	TBA
Round 10
Penrith Brothers	V	Glebe Dirty Reds	Saturday, 13 June, 5:30pm	Parker Street Reserve	TBA
Manly Leagues	V	Canterbury-Bankstown Bulldogs (C)	Sunday, 14 June, 2:00pm	Sydney Academy of Sport	TBA
Hills District Bulls	V	St Marys Saints	Sunday, 14 June, 3:00pm	Crestwood Reserve	TBA
Blacktown Workers	V	Mount Pritchard Mounties	Sunday, 14 June, 3:00pm	HE Laybutt Sporting Complex	TBA
Ryde-Eastwood Hawks	V	Wentworthville Magpies	Sunday, 14 June, TBA	TBA	TBA
Round 11 (Magic Round)
St Marys Saints	V	Ryde-Eastwood Hawks	Saturday, 20 June, TBA	St Marys Leagues Stadium	TBA
Mount Pritchard Mounties	V	Penrith Brothers	Saturday, 20 June, TBA	St Marys Leagues Stadium	TBA
Glebe Dirty Reds	V	Hills District Bulls	Saturday, 20 June, TBA	St Marys Leagues Stadium	TBA
Wentworthville Magpies	V	Manly Leagues	Saturday, 20 June, TBA	St Marys Leagues Stadium	TBA
Blacktown Workers	V	Canterbury-Bankstown Bulldogs (C)	Saturday, 20 June, TBA	St Marys Leagues Stadium	TBA
Round 12
St Marys Saints	V	Manly Leagues	Saturday, 27 June, 3:00pm	St Marys Leagues Stadium	TBA
Mount Pritchard Mounties	V	Ryde-Eastwood Hawks	Saturday, 27 June, 3:00pm	Aubrey Keech Reserve	TBA
Penrith Brothers	V	Wentworthville Magpies	Saturday, 27 June, 3:00pm	Parker Street Reserve	TBA
Hills District Bulls	V	Canterbury-Bankstown Bulldogs (C)	Sunday, 28 June, 3:00pm	Crestwood Reserve	TBA
Blacktown Workers	V	Glebe Dirty Reds	Sunday, 28 June, 3:00pm	HE Laybutt Sporting Complex	TBA
Round 13
Mount Pritchard Mounties	V	Hills District Bulls	Saturday, 4 July, 3:00pm	Aubrey Keech Reserve	TBA
Penrith Brothers	V	Manly Leagues	Saturday, 4 July, 5:30pm	Parker Street Reserve	TBA
Canterbury-Bankstown Bulldogs (C)	V	Ryde-Eastwood Hawks	Saturday, 4 July, 5:45pm	Hammondville Oval	TBA
Glebe Dirty Reds	V	St Marys Saints	Sunday, 5 July, 2:00pm	Wentworth Park	TBA
Wentworthville Magpies	V	Blacktown Workers	Sunday, 5 July, 3:00pm	Ringrose Park	TBA
Round 14
St Marys Saints	V	Blacktown Workers	Saturday, 11 July, 3:00pm	St Marys Leagues Stadium	TBA
Ryde-Eastwood Hawks	V	Manly Leagues	Saturday, 11 July, 3:30pm	Lidcombe Oval	TBA
Penrith Brothers	V	Hills District Bulls	Saturday, 11 July, 5:30pm	Parker Street Reserve	TBA
Canterbury-Bankstown Bulldogs (C)	V	Mount Pritchard Mounties	Saturday, 11 July, 5:45pm	Hammondville Oval	TBA
Glebe Dirty Reds	V	Wentworthville Magpies	Sunday, 12 July, 10:30am	Wentworth Park	TBA
Round 15
Manly Leagues	V	Blacktown Workers	Saturday, 18 July, 12:45pm	4 Pines Park	TBA
Canterbury-Bankstown Bulldogs (C)	V	Penrith Brothers	Saturday, 18 July, 5:45pm	Hammondville Oval	TBA
Glebe Dirty Reds	V	Mount Pritchard Mounties	Sunday, 19 July, 10:30am	Wentworth Park	TBA
Wentworthville Magpies	V	St Marys Saints	Sunday, 19 July, 3:00pm	Ringrose Park	TBA
Hills District Bulls	V	Ryde-Eastwood Hawks	Sunday, 19 July, 3:00pm	Crestwood Reserve	TBA
Round 16
Penrith Brothers	V	St Marys Saints	Saturday, 25 July, 5:30pm	Parker Street Reserve	TBA
Canterbury-Bankstown Bulldogs (C)	V	Glebe Dirty Reds	Saturday, 25 July, 5:45pm	Hammondville Oval	TBA
Manly Leagues	V	Mount Pritchard Mounties	Sunday, 26 July, 2:00pm	Sydney Academy of Sport	TBA
Wentworthville Magpies	V	Ryde-Eastwood Hawks	Sunday, 26 July, 3:00pm	Ringrose Park	TBA
Blacktown Workers	V	Hills District Bulls	Sunday, 26 July, 3:00pm	HE Laybutt Sporting Complex	TBA
Round 17
Ryde-Eastwood Hawks	V	Penrith Brothers	Saturday, 1 August, 2:00pm	Leichhardt Oval	TBA
St Marys Saints	V	Canterbury-Bankstown Bulldogs (C)	Saturday, 1 August, 3:00pm	St Marys Leagues Stadium	TBA
Mount Pritchard Mounties	V	Blacktown Workers	Saturday, 1 August, 5:00pm	Aubrey Keech Reserve	TBA
Wentworthville Magpies	V	Hills District Bulls	Saturday, 1 August, 6:00pm	Ringrose Park	TBA
Glebe Dirty Reds	V	Manly Leagues	Sunday, 2 August, 10:30am	Wentworth Park	TBA
Round 18
Penrith Brothers	V	Blacktown Workers	Friday, 7 August, 7:30pm	Parker Street Reserve	TBA
Ryde-Eastwood Hawks	V	Glebe Dirty Reds	Saturday, 8 August, 2:00pm	Lidcombe Oval	TBA
St Marys Saints	V	Mount Pritchard Mounties	Saturday, 8 August, 3:00pm	St Marys Leagues Stadium	TBA
Canterbury-Bankstown Bulldogs (C)	V	Wentworthville Magpies	Saturday, 8 August, 5:45pm	Hammondville Oval	TBA
Hills District Bulls	V	Manly Leagues	Sunday, 9 August, 3:00pm	Crestwood Reserve	TBA
Finals Series
Qualifying & Elimination Finals
2nd Place	V	3rd Place	15/16 August	TBA	TBA
4th Place	V	5th Place	15/16 August	TBA	TBA
Semi-Finals
1st Place	V	QF Winner	22/23 August	TBA	TBA
QF Loser	V	EF Winner	22/23 August	TBA	TBA
Preliminary Final
Major SF Loser	V	Minor SF Winner	29/30 August	TBA	TBA
Grand Final
Major SF Winner	V	PF Winner	5/6 September	TBA	TBA

==== Grand Final ====
Qualifying & Elimination Finals
2
3
4
5

Major Semi-Final
1
2/3
Minor Semi-Final
2/3
4/5

Preliminary Final
1/2/3
2/3/4/5

Grand Final
1/2/3
1/2/3/4/5

2026 Ron Massey Cup Grand Final

5/6 September
TBA

Major SF Winner	v	PF Winner

TBA

=== Newcastle Premiership ===
2026 Denton Engineering Cup
- Duration: 11 April – 6 September 2026
- Teams: 10
- Broadcast partners: Streaming; BarTV Sports (All Matches)

The Newcastle Premiership (named the Denton Engineering Cup for sponsorship reasons) is a long-standing open-age competition centred on the Newcastle region. While administered locally, it is recognised within the NSWRL pathways system as a key regional competition, bridging the gap between community rugby league and state-level open-age competitions.

Final details for the 2026 season, including the participating clubs and finals format, will be added when confirmed.

==== Teams ====
===== Club changes =====
- The 2026 Denton Engineering Cup will feature 10 teams, reduced from 11 in 2025, after the Wyong Roos withdrew from the competition to focus solely on the Central Coast competition.
- Central Newcastle Butcher Boys – Lucas Miller has been appointed as head coach for the 2026 season.
- Northern Hawks – former Newcastle Knights forward Steve Simpson has been appointed as head coach for 2026.
- Western Suburbs Rosellas – former Central Newcastle coach Adam Bettridge has moved across to take over as head coach for the 2026 season.

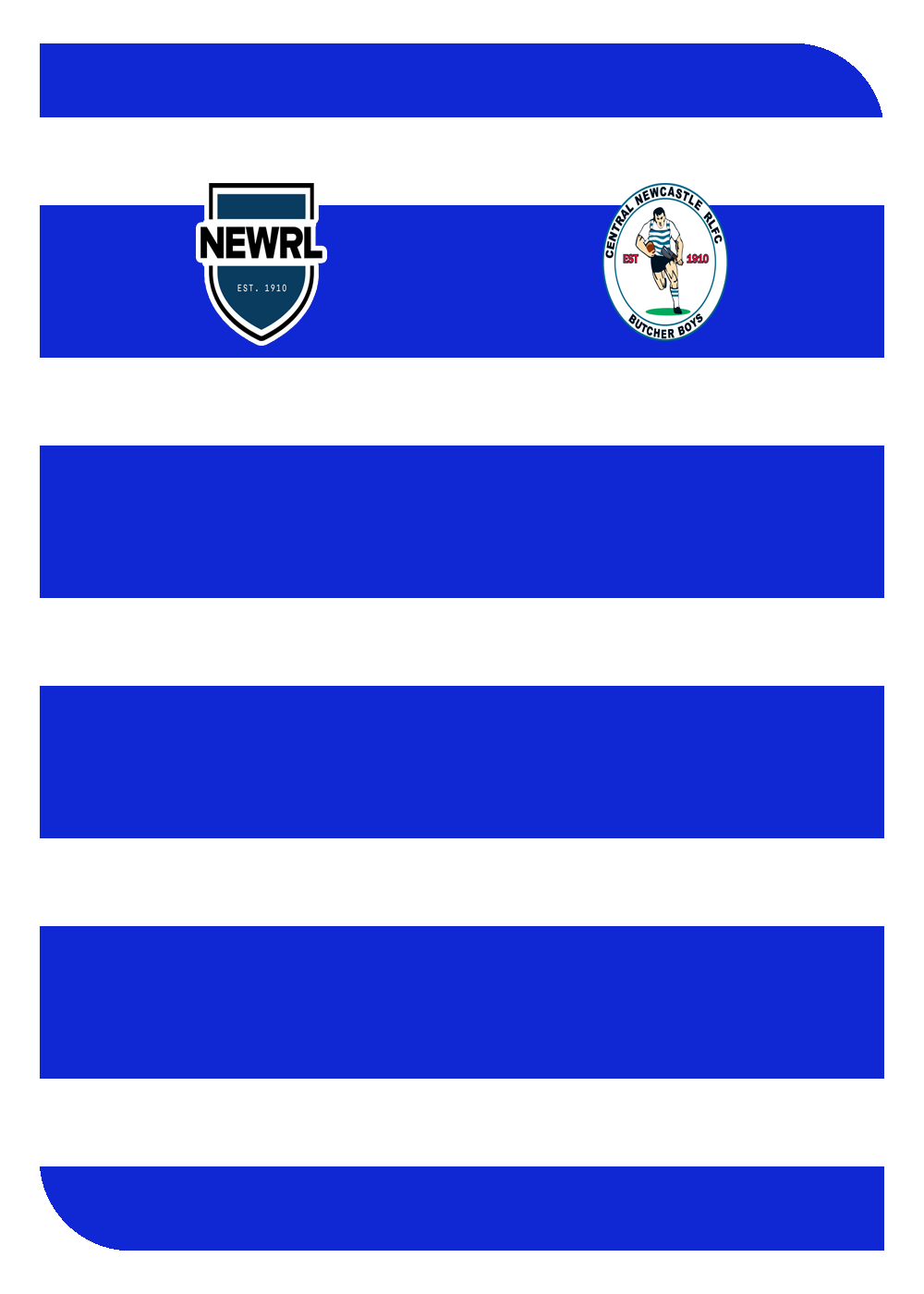
Central Newcastle; Butcher Boys Ground: St John Oval City/Suburb: Newcastle (Charlestown) Head coach: Lucas Miller

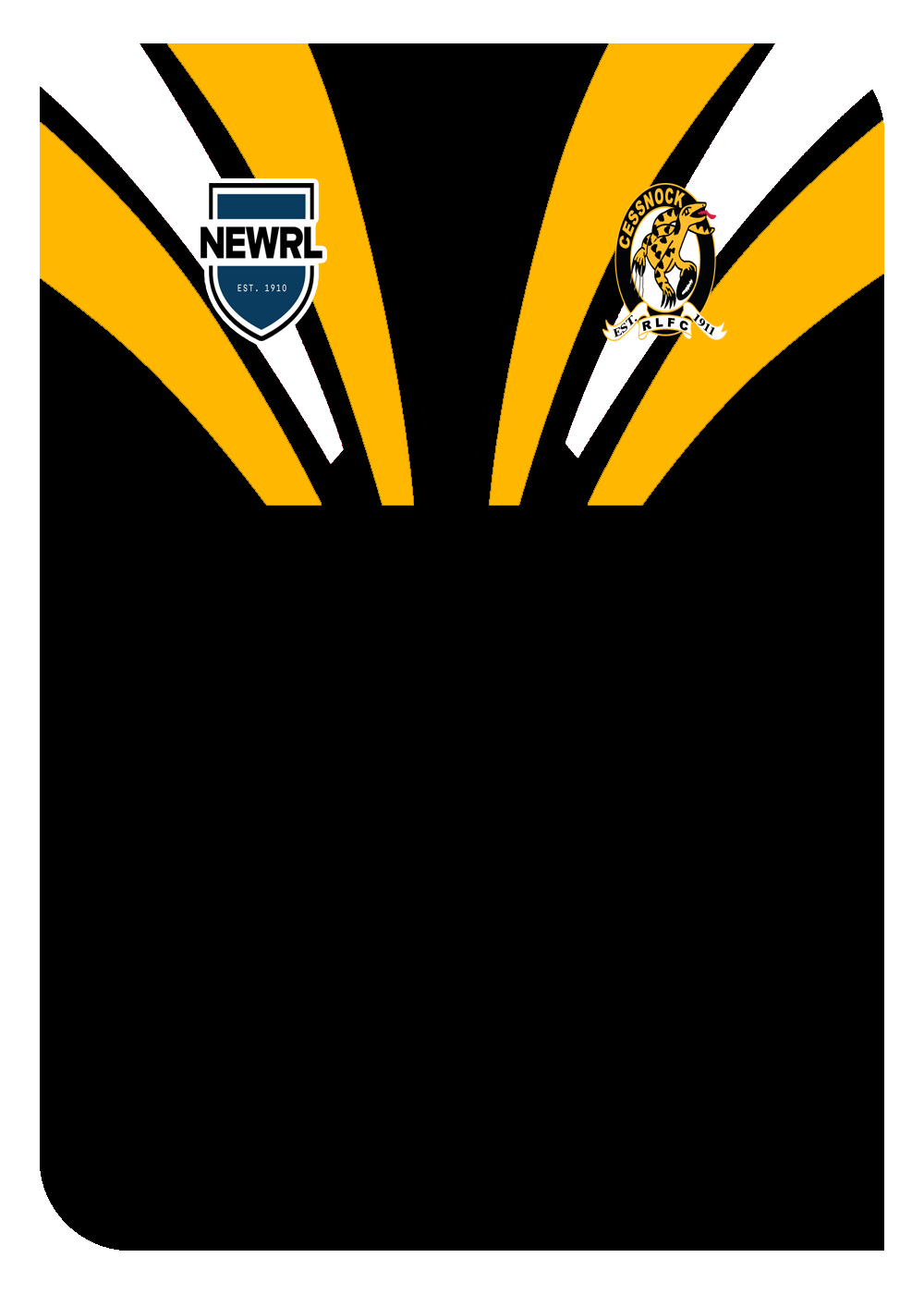
Cessnock; Goannas Ground: Cessnock Sportsground City/Suburb: Cessnock Head coach: Harry Siejka

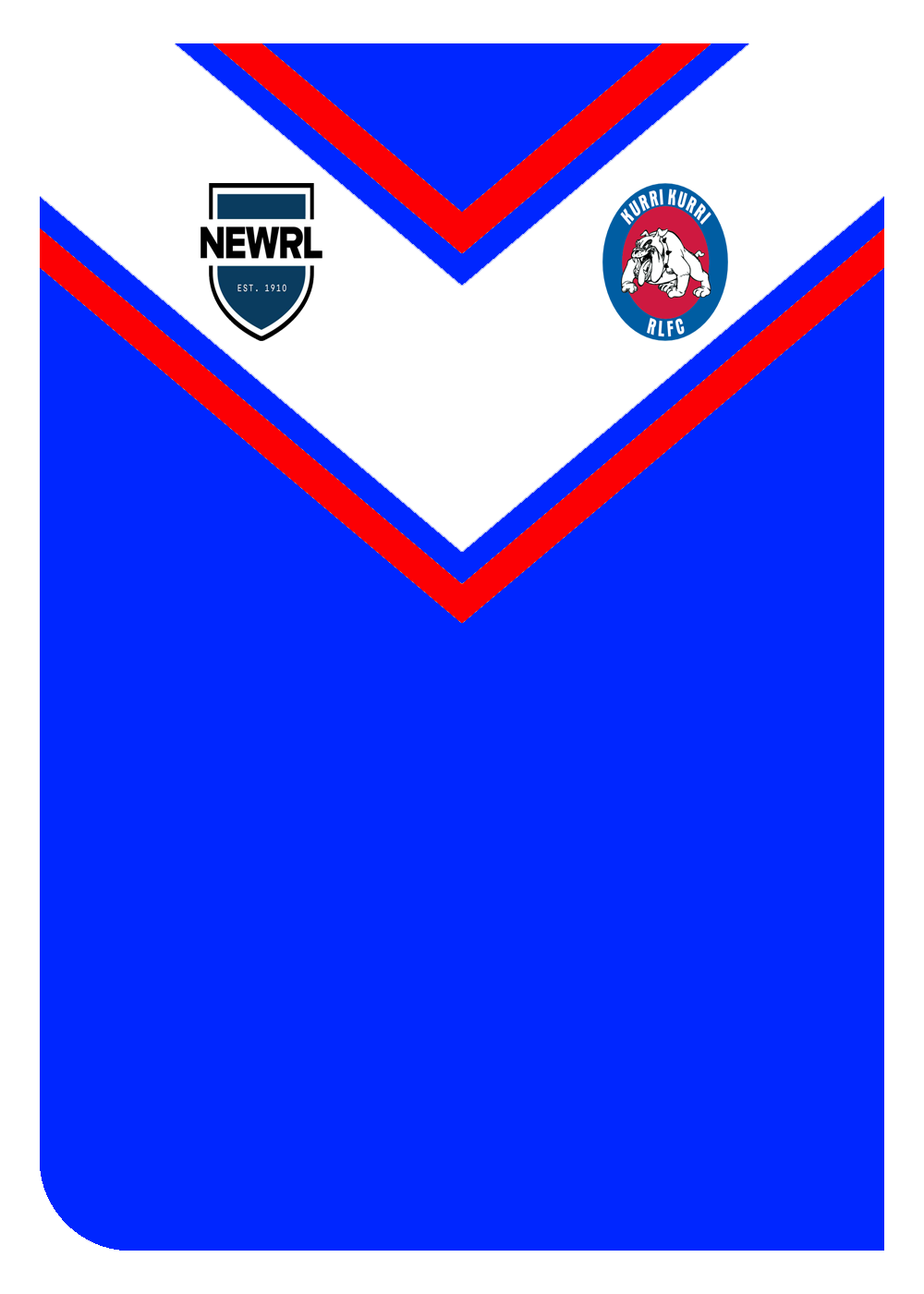
Kurri Kurri; Bulldogs Ground: Kurri Kurri Sportsground City/Suburb: Kurri Kurri Head coach: Paul Stringer

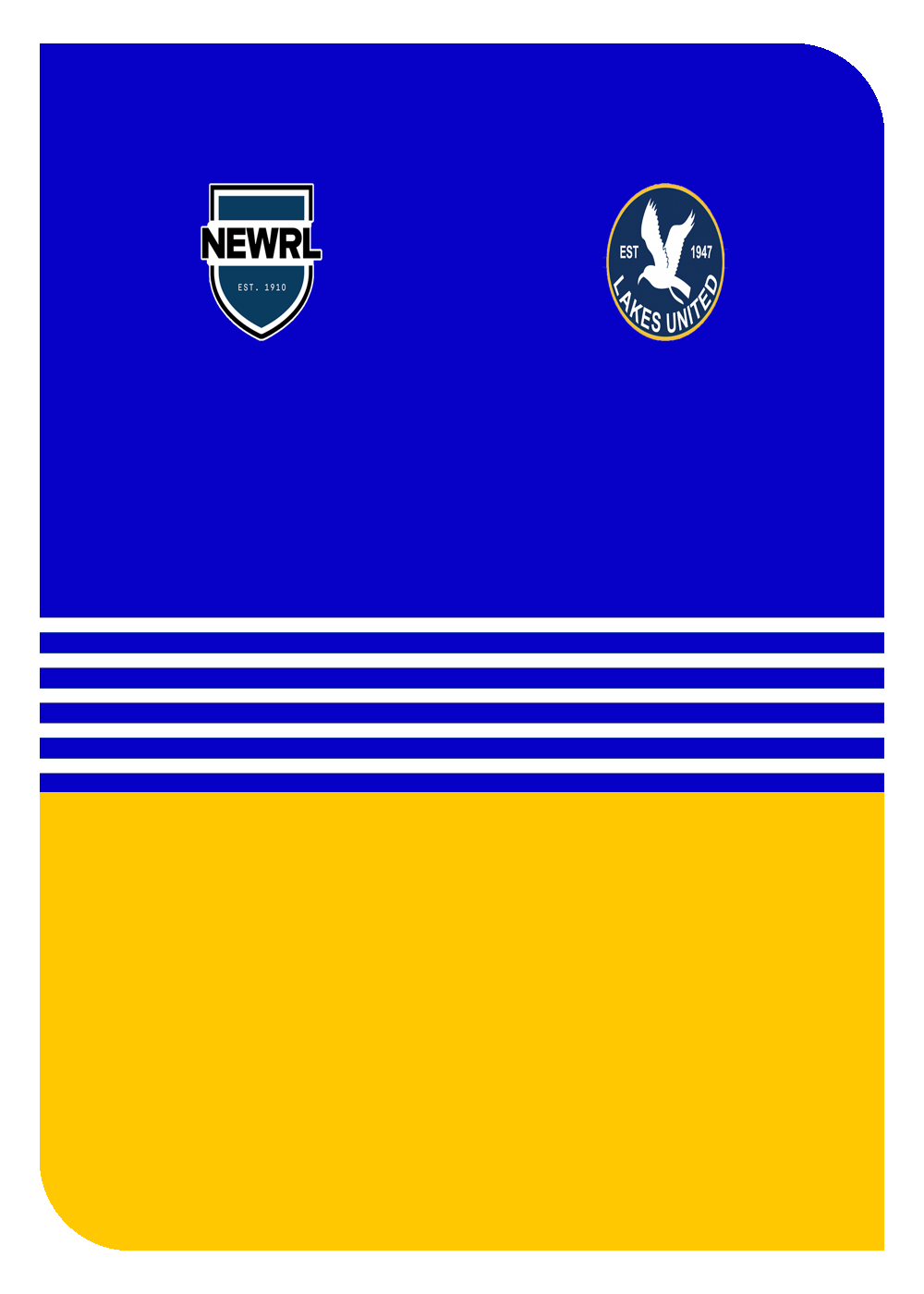
Lakes United; Seagulls Ground: Cahill Oval City/Suburb: Lake Macquarie (Belmont) Head coach: Brad Murray & Al Lantry

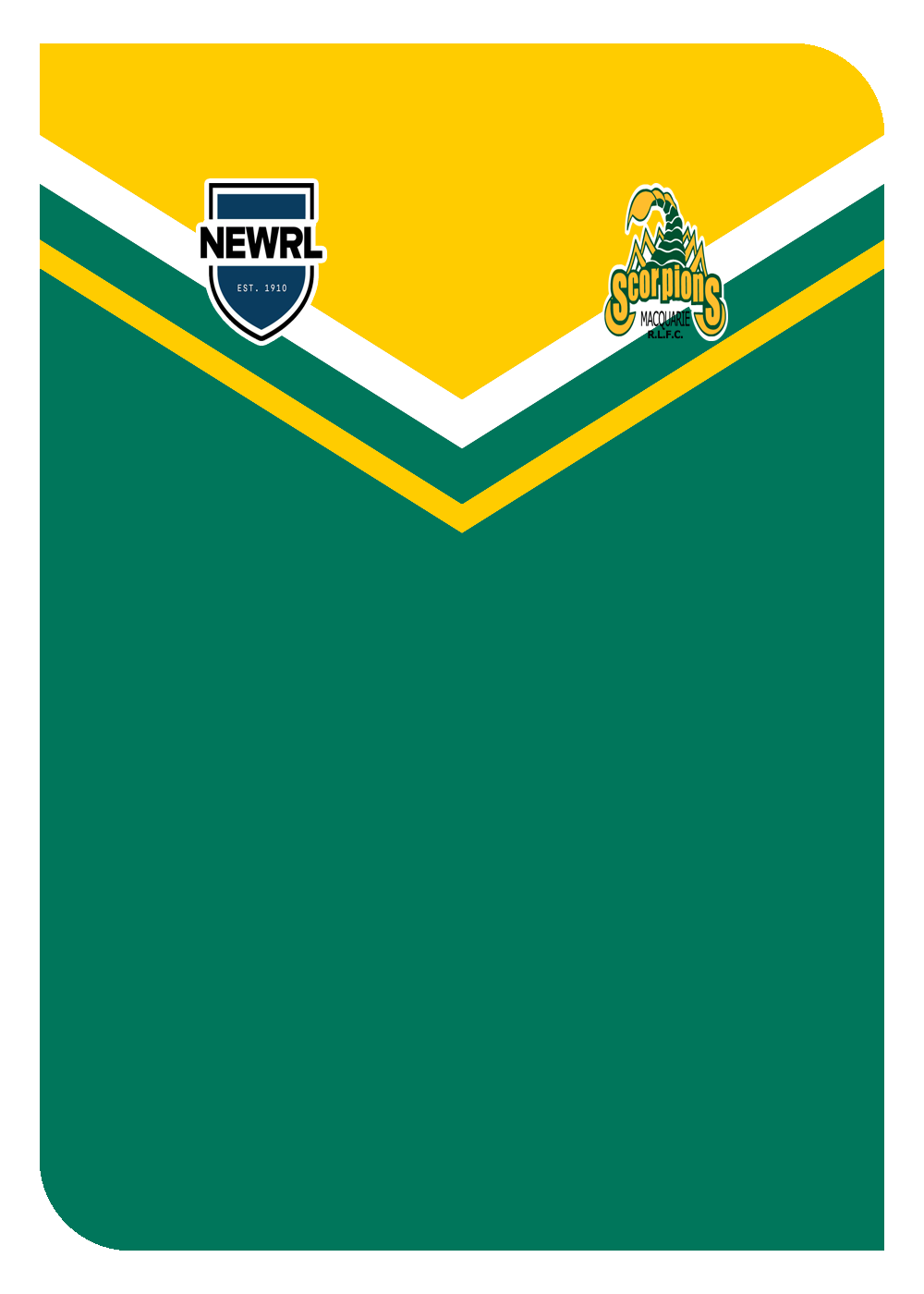
Macquarie; Scorpions Ground: Lyall Peacock Field City/Suburb: Lake Macquarie (Toronto) Head coach: Jye Bailey

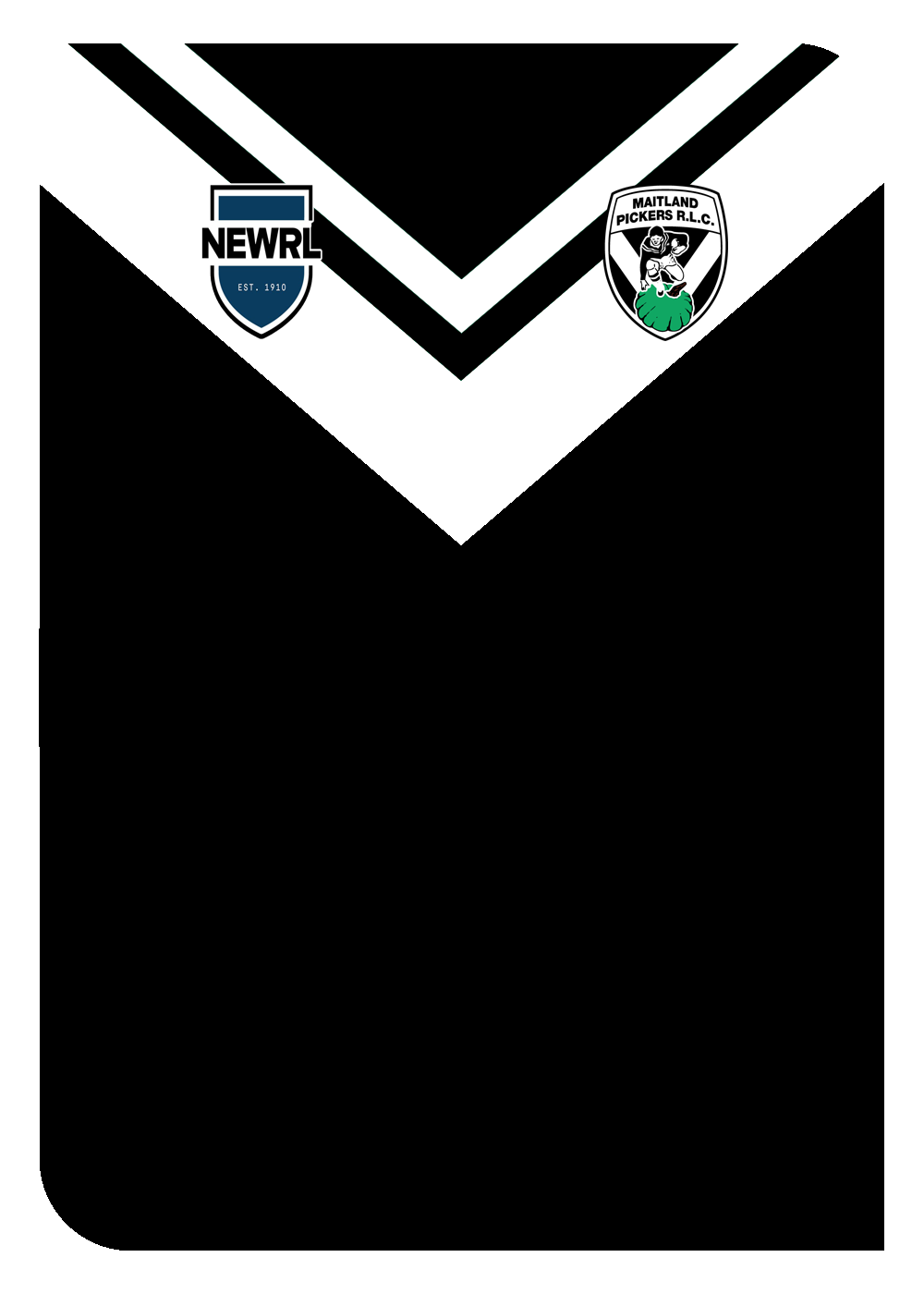
Maitland; Pickers Ground: Maitland Sportsground City/Suburb: Maitland (Maitland) Head coach: Matt Lantry

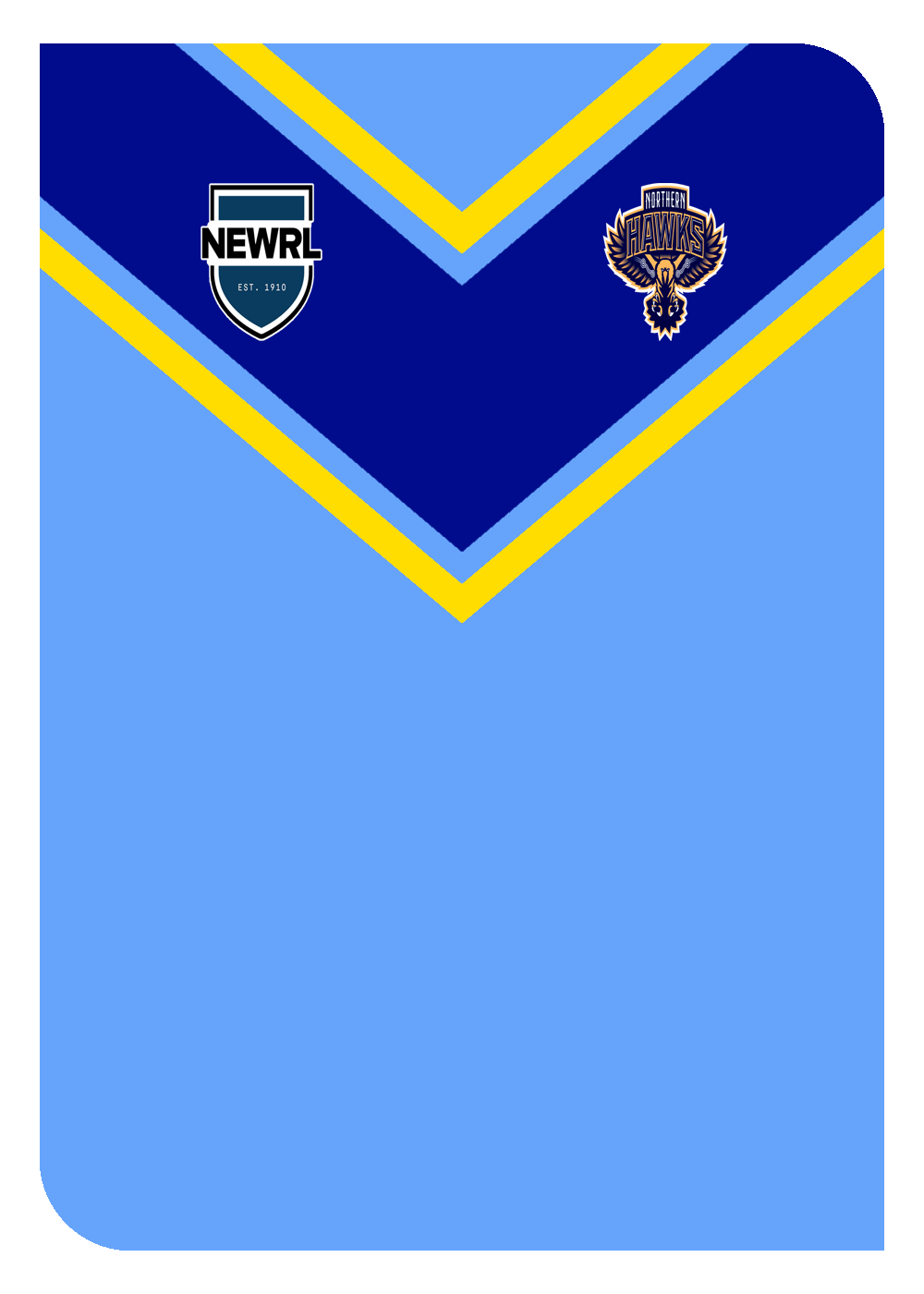
Northern; Hawks Ground: Tomaree Sportsground City/Suburb: Port Stephens (Nelson Bay) Head coach: Steve Simpson

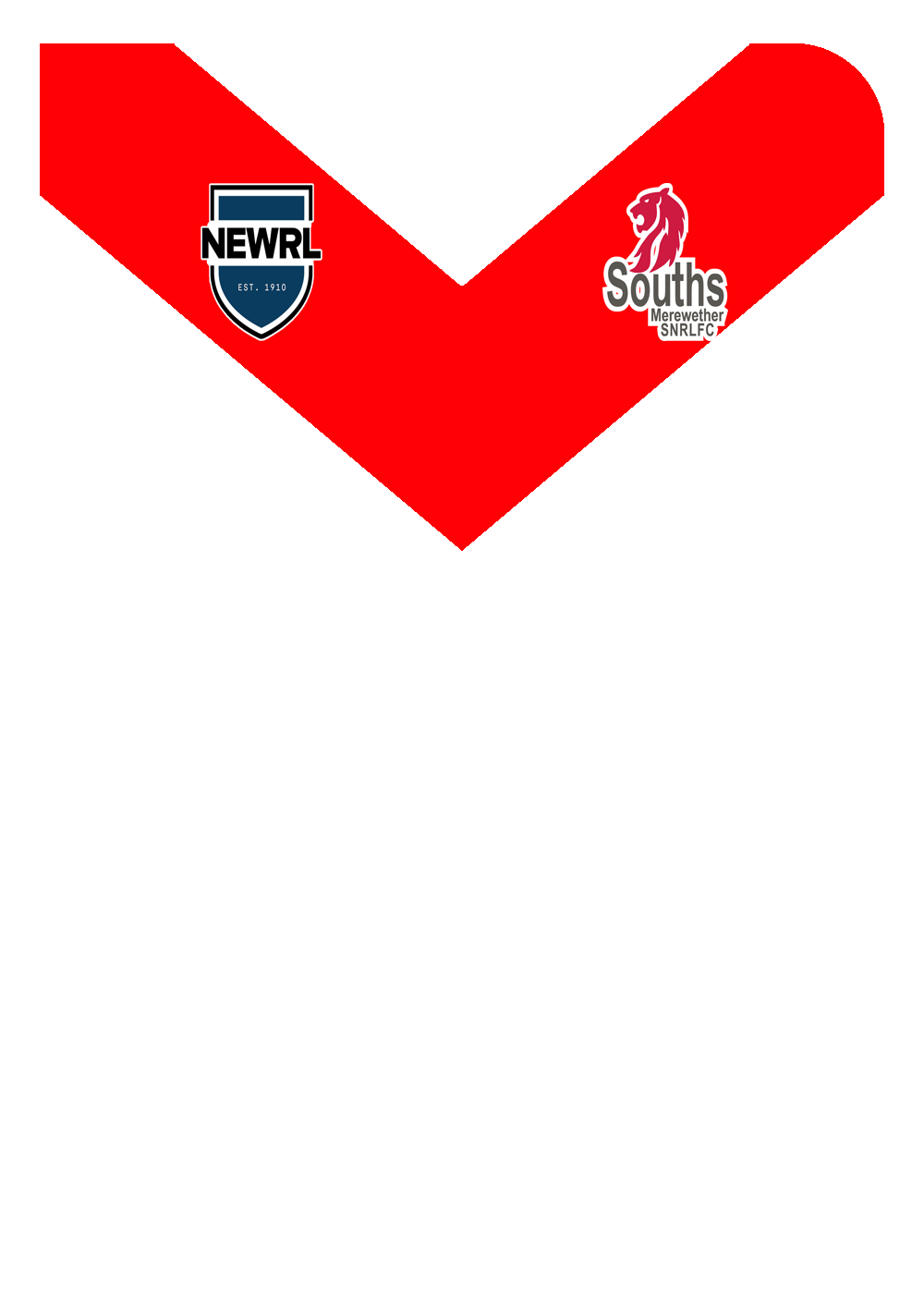
South Newcastle; Lions Ground: Townson Oval City/Suburb: Newcastle (Merewether) Head coach: Andrew Ryan

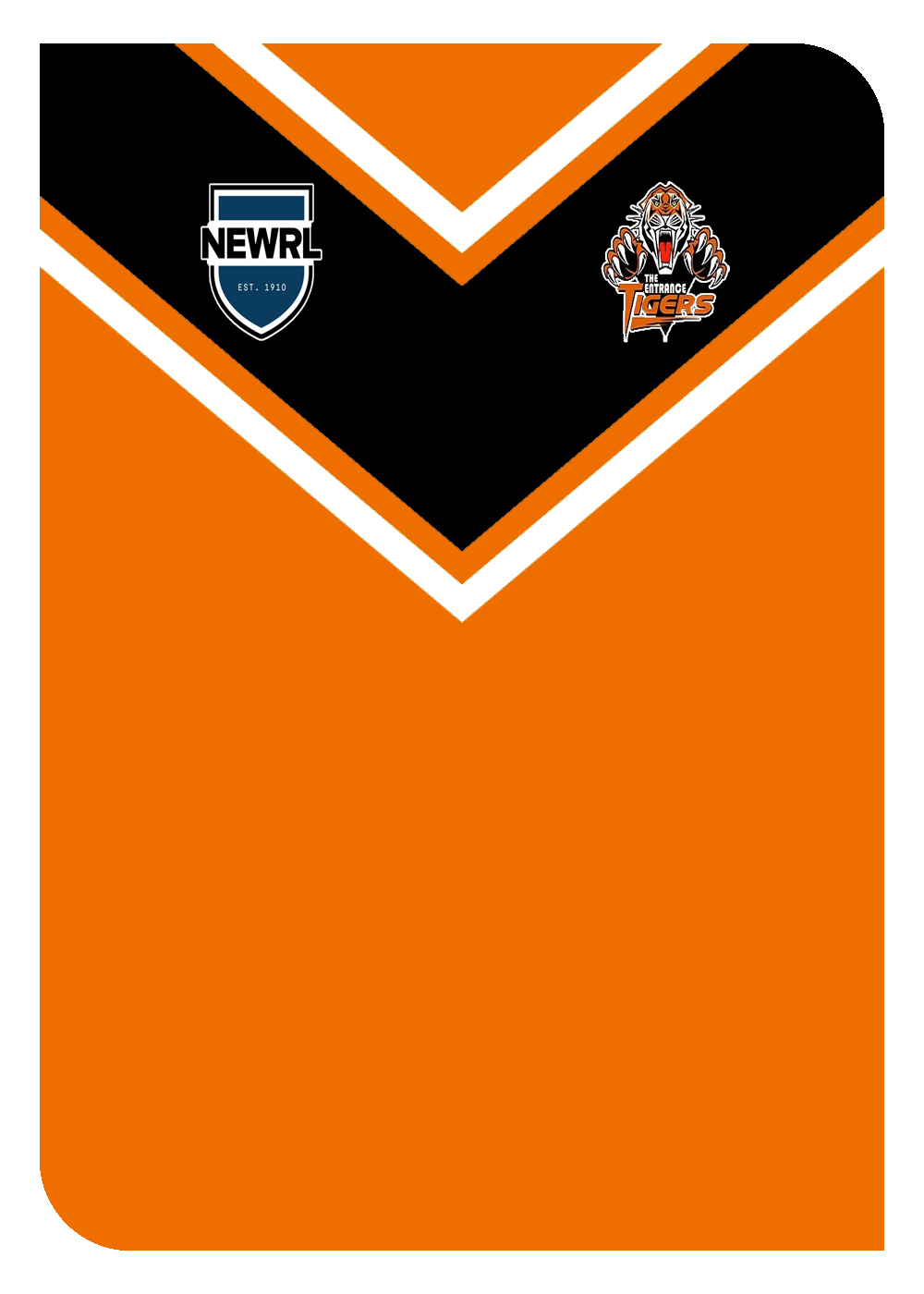
The Entrance; Tigers Ground: EDSAAC Oval City/Suburb: Central Coast (Bateau Bay) Head coach: Paul Tideman

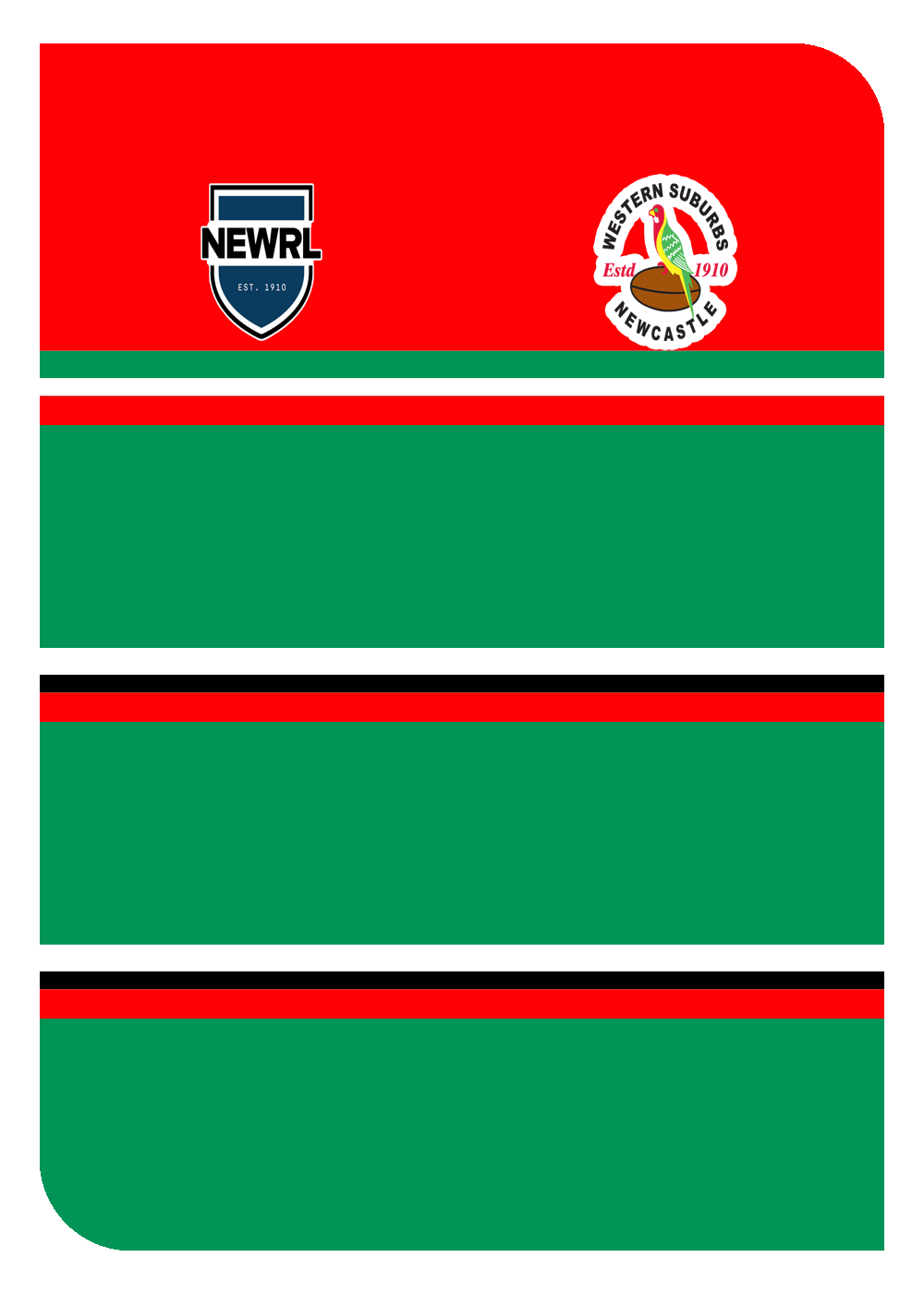
Western Suburbs; Rosellas Ground: Harker Oval City/Suburb: Newcastle (New Lambton) Head coach: Adam Bettridge

==== Ladder ====
Pos	Team	Pld	W	D	L	B	PF	PA	PD	Pts	Qualification
1	Central Newcastle Butcher Boys	0	0	0	0	0	0	0	0	0	Minor Premiers & Major Semi-Final
2	Cessnock Goannas	0	0	0	0	0	0	0	0	0	Qualifying Final
3	Kurri Kurri Bulldogs	0	0	0	0	0	0	0	0	0	Qualifying Final
4	Lakes United Seagulls	0	0	0	0	0	0	0	0	0	Elimination Final
5	Macquarie Scorpions	0	0	0	0	0	0	0	0	0	Elimination Final
6	Maitland Pickers	0	0	0	0	0	0	0	0	0	
7	Northern Hawks	0	0	0	0	0	0	0	0	0	
8	South Newcastle Lions	0	0	0	0	0	0	0	0	0	
9	The Entrance Tigers	0	0	0	0	0	0	0	0	0	
10	Western Suburbs Rosellas	0	0	0	0	0	0	0	0	0	

Updated to match(es) played on unknown. Source:
Rules for classification: 1) points; 2) point difference; 3) points scored

===== Ladder progression =====
- Numbers highlighted in green indicate that the team finished the round inside the top 5.
- Numbers highlighted in blue indicates the team finished first on the ladder in that round.
- Numbers highlighted in red indicates the team finished last place on the ladder in that round.
- Underlined numbers indicate that the team had a bye during that round.

Pos	Team	1	2	3	4	5	6	7	8	9	10	11	12	13	14	15	16
1	Central Newcastle Butcher Boys																
2	Cessnock Goannas																
3	Kurri Kurri Bulldogs																
4	Lakes United Seagulls																
5	Macquarie Scorpions																
6	Maitland Pickers																
7	Northern Hawks																
8	South Newcastle Lions																
9	The Entrance Tigers																
10	Western Suburbs Rosellas																

Season Results:

Home	Score	Away	Match Information
Home	Score	Away	Date and Time	Venue	Referee	Video
Round 1 (Magic Round)
The Entrance Tigers	V	Western Suburbs Rosellas	Saturday, 11 April, 11:30am	Maitland Sportsground	TBA
Kurri Kurri Bulldogs	V	Central Newcastle Butcher Boys	Saturday, 11 April, 1:10pm	Maitland Sportsground	TBA
Maitland Pickers	V	Macquarie Scorpions	Saturday, 11 April, 2:50pm	Maitland Sportsground	TBA
South Newcastle Lions	V	Cessnock Goannas	Saturday, 11 April, 4:30pm	Maitland Sportsground	TBA
Northern Hawks	V	Lakes United Seagulls	Saturday, 11 April, 6:10pm	Maitland Sportsground	TBA
Round 2
Kurri Kurri Bulldogs	V	Maitland Pickers	Saturday, 18 April, 3:00pm	Kurri Kurri Sportsground	TBA
Cessnock Goannas	V	Macquarie Scorpions	Saturday, 18 April, 3:00pm	Cessnock Sportsground	TBA
Northern Hawks	V	Kurri Kurri Bulldogs	Saturday, 18 April, 3:00pm	Tomaree Sportsground	TBA
The Entrance Tigers	V	South Newcastle Lions	Sunday, 19 April, 3:00pm	EDSAAC Oval	TBA
Western Suburbs Rosellas	V	Lakes United Seagulls	Sunday, 19 April, 3:00pm	Harker Oval	TBA
Round 3 (ANZAC Round)
Central Newcastle Butcher Boys	V	Macquarie Scorpions	Saturday, 25 April, 3:00pm	St John Oval	TBA
Cessnock Goannas	V	Kurri Kurri Bulldogs	Saturday, 25 April, 3:00pm	Cessnock Sportsground	TBA
Lakes United Seagulls	V	The Entrance Tigers	Saturday, 25 April, 3:00pm	Cahill Oval	TBA
Maitland Pickers	V	Northern Hawks	Saturday, 25 April, 3:00pm	Maitland Sportsground	TBA
South Newcastle Lions	V	Western Suburbs Rosellas	Saturday, 25 April, 3:00pm	Townson Oval	TBA
Round 4
Cessnock Goannas	V	Northern Hawks	Saturday, 2 May, 3:00pm	Cessnock Sportsground	TBA
Kurri Kurri Bulldogs	V	The Entrance Tigers	Saturday, 2 May, 3:00pm	Kurri Kurri Sportsground	TBA
Lakes United Seagulls	V	South Newcastle Lions	Saturday, 2 May, 3:00pm	Cahill Oval	TBA
Macquarie Scorpions	V	Maitland Pickers	Saturday, 2 May, 3:00pm	Lyall Peacock Field	TBA
Western Suburbs Rosellas	V	Central Newcastle Butcher Boys	Saturday, 2 May, 3:00pm	Harker Oval	TBA
Round 5
Central Newcastle Butcher Boys	V	Cessnock Goannas	Saturday, 9 May, 3:00pm	St John Oval	TBA
Lakes United Seagulls	V	Kurri Kurri Bulldogs	Saturday, 9 May, 3:00pm	Cahill Oval	TBA
Western Suburbs Rosellas	V	Maitland Pickers	Sunday, 10 May, 3:00pm	Harker Oval	TBA
South Newcastle Lions	V	Northern Hawks	Sunday, 10 May, 3:00pm	Townson Oval	TBA
Macquarie Scorpions	V	The Entrance Tigers	Sunday, 10 May, 3:00pm	Lyall Peacock Field	TBA
Round 6
Northern Hawks	V	Western Suburbs Rosellas	Saturday, 23 May, 3:00pm	Tomaree Sportsground	TBA
Kurri Kurri Bulldogs	V	Cessnock Goannas	Saturday, 23 May, 3:00pm	Kurri Kurri Sportsground	TBA
Macquarie Scorpions	V	Lakes United Seagulls	Saturday, 23 May, 3:00pm	Lyall Peacock Field	TBA
Maitland Pickers	V	South Newcastle Lions	Saturday, 23 May, 3:00pm	Maitland Sportsground	TBA
The Entrance Tigers	V	Central Newcastle Butcher Boys	Sunday, 24 May, 3:00pm	EDSAAC Oval	TBA
Round 7
Cessnock Goannas	V	The Entrance Tigers	Saturday, 30 May, 3:00pm	Cessnock Sportsground	TBA
Northern Hawks	V	Central Newcastle Butcher Boys	Saturday, 30 May, 3:00pm	Tomaree Sportsground	TBA
Kurri Kurri Bulldogs	V	South Newcastle Lions	Saturday, 30 May, 3:00pm	Kurri Kurri Sportsground	TBA
Western Suburbs Rosellas	V	Macquarie Scorpions	Sunday, 31 May, 3:00pm	Harker Oval	TBA
Lakes United Seagulls	V	Maitland Pickers	Sunday, 31 May, 3:00pm	Cahill Oval	TBA
Round 8
Central Newcastle Butcher Boys	V	Kurri Kurri Bulldogs	Saturday, 6 June, 3:00pm	St John Oval	TBA
Macquarie Scorpions	V	Cessnock Goannas	Saturday, 6 June, 3:00pm	Lyall Peacock Field	TBA
Maitland Pickers	V	Western Suburbs Rosellas	Saturday, 6 June, 3:00pm	Maitland Sportsground	TBA
South Newcastle Lions	V	Lakes United Seagulls	Saturday, 6 June, 3:00pm	Townson Oval	TBA
The Entrance Tigers	V	Northern Hawks	Sunday, 7 June, 3:00pm	EDSAAC Oval	TBA
Round 9
Kurri Kurri Bulldogs	V	Northern Hawks	Saturday, 13 June, 3:00pm	Kurri Kurri Sportsground	TBA
Lakes United Seagulls	V	Macquarie Scorpions	Saturday, 13 June, 3:00pm	Cahill Oval	TBA
Maitland Pickers	V	Central Newcastle Butcher Boys	Saturday, 13 June, 3:00pm	Maitland Sportsground	TBA
South Newcastle Lions	V	The Entrance Tigers	Sunday, 14 June, 3:00pm	Townson Oval	TBA
Western Suburbs Rosellas	V	Cessnock Goannas	Sunday, 14 June, 3:00pm	Harker Oval	TBA
Round 10
Lakes United Seagulls	V	Western Suburbs Rosellas	Saturday, 20 June, 3:00pm	Cahill Oval	TBA
Cessnock Goannas	V	South Newcastle Lions	Saturday, 20 June, 3:00pm	Cessnock Sportsground	TBA
Kurri Kurri Bulldogs	V	Maitland Pickers	Saturday, 20 June, 3:00pm	Kurri Kurri Sportsground	TBA
Northern Hawks	V	Macquarie Scorpions	Saturday, 20 June, 3:00pm	Tomaree Sportsground	TBA
Central Newcastle Butcher Boys	V	The Entrance Tigers	Sunday, 21 June, 3:00pm	St John Oval	TBA
Round 11
South Newcastle Lions	V	Macquarie Scorpions	Saturday, 27 June, 3:00pm	Townson Oval	TBA
Western Suburbs Rosellas	V	Kurri Kurri Bulldogs	Saturday, 27 June, 3:00pm	Harker Oval	TBA
Cessnock Goannas	V	Lakes United Seagulls	Saturday, 27 June, 5:00pm	Cessnock Sportsground	TBA
Central Newcastle Butcher Boys	V	Northern Hawks	Sunday, 28 June, 3:00pm	St John Oval	TBA
The Entrance Tigers	V	Maitland Pickers	Sunday, 28 June, 3:00pm	EDSAAC Oval	TBA
Round 12 (Indigenous Round)
Northern Hawks	V	Maitland Pickers	Saturday, 4 July, 3:00pm	Lakeside Sporting Complex	TBA
Kurri Kurri Bulldogs	V	Lakes United Seagulls	Saturday, 4 July, 3:00pm	Kurri Kurri Sportsground	TBA
Western Suburbs Rosellas	V	South Newcastle Lions	Saturday, 4 July, 3:00pm	Harker Oval	TBA
Macquarie Scorpions	V	Central Newcastle Butcher Boys	Sunday, 5 July, 3:00pm	Lyall Peacock Field	TBA
The Entrance Tigers	V	Cessnock Goannas	Sunday, 5 July, 3:00pm	EDSAAC Oval	TBA
Round 13
Cessnock Goannas	V	Western Suburbs Rosellas	Saturday, 11 July, 3:00pm	Cessnock Sportsground	TBA
Northern Hawks	V	The Entrance Tigers	Saturday, 11 July, 3:00pm	Tomaree Sportsground	TBA
Macquarie Scorpions	V	Kurri Kurri Bulldogs	Saturday, 11 July, 3:00pm	Lyall Peacock Field	TBA
Maitland Pickers	V	Lakes United Seagulls	Saturday, 11 July, 3:00pm	Maitland Sportsground	TBA
South Newcastle Lions	V	Central Newcastle Butcher Boys	Sunday, 12 July, 3:00pm	Townson Oval	TBA
Round 14 (Sleapy's Day)
South Newcastle Lions	V	Maitland Pickers	Saturday, 18 July, 3:00pm	Townson Oval	TBA
Central Newcastle Butcher Boys	V	Western Suburbs Rosellas	Sunday, 19 July, 3:00pm	St John Oval	TBA
Lakes United Seagulls	V	Cessnock Goannas	Sunday, 19 July, 3:00pm	Cahill Oval	TBA
Macquarie Scorpions	V	Northern Hawks	Sunday, 19 July, 3:00pm	Lyall Peacock Field	TBA
The Entrance Tigers	V	Kurri Kurri Bulldogs	Sunday, 19 July, 3:00pm	EDSAAC Oval	TBA
Round 15
Central Newcastle Butcher Boys	V	Lakes United Seagulls	Saturday, 1 August, 3:00pm	St John Oval	TBA
Northern Hawks	V	South Newcastle Lions	Saturday, 1 August, 3:00pm	Lakeside Sporting Complex	TBA
Kurri Kurri Bulldogs	V	Western Suburbs Rosellas	Saturday, 1 August, 3:00pm	Kurri Kurri Sportsground	TBA
Maitland Pickers	V	Cessnock Goannas	Saturday, 1 August, 3:00pm	Maitland Sportsground	TBA
The Entrance Tigers	V	Macquarie Scorpions	Sunday, 2 August, 3:00pm	EDSAAC Oval	TBA
Round 16
Cessnock Goannas	V	Central Newcastle Butcher Boys	Saturday, 8 August, 3:00pm	Cessnock Sportsground	TBA
Lakes United Seagulls	V	Northern Hawks	Saturday, 8 August, 3:00pm	Cahill Oval	TBA
Macquarie Scorpions	V	South Newcastle Lions	Saturday, 8 August, 3:00pm	Lyall Peacock Field	TBA
Maitland Pickers	V	Kurri Kurri Bulldogs	Saturday, 8 August, 3:00pm	Maitland Sportsground	TBA
Western Suburbs Rosellas	V	The Entrance Tigers	Saturday, 8 August, 3:00pm	Harker Oval	TBA
Finals Series
Qualifying & Elimination Finals
2nd Place	V	3rd Place	15/16 August	TBA	TBA
4th Place	V	5th Place	15/16 August	TBA	TBA
Semi-Finals
1st Place	V	QF Winner	22/23 August	TBA	TBA
QF Loser	V	EF Winner	22/23 August	TBA	TBA
Preliminary Final
Major SF Loser	V	Minor SF Winner	29/30 August	TBA	TBA
Grand Final
Major SF Winner	V	PF Winner	Sunday, 6 September, TBA	McDonald Jones Stadium	TBA

==== Grand Final ====
Qualifying & Elimination Finals
2
3
4
5

Major Semi-Final
1
2/3
Minor Semi-Final
2/3
4/5

Preliminary Final
1/2/3
2/3/4/5

Grand Final
1/2/3
1/2/3/4/5

2026 Newcastle Premiership Grand Final

Sunday, 6 September
TBA

Major SF Winner	v	PF Winner

McDonald Jones Stadium, Newcastle

=== Illawarra Premiership ===
2026 Harrigan Premiership
- Duration: TBA 2026
- Teams: 6

The Illawarra Premiership (named the Harrigan Premiership for sponsorship reasons) is the premier open-age club competition in the Illawarra region of New South Wales. Historically one of the strongest regional competitions in the state, it provides a platform for local talent to progress towards state and national levels through NSWRL and NRL pathways.

==== Teams ====
===== Club Changes =====
- De La Salle Caringbah are replaced by Sutherland-Loftus United Pirates for 2026 due to De La Salle ending their feeder arrangement with Newtown.

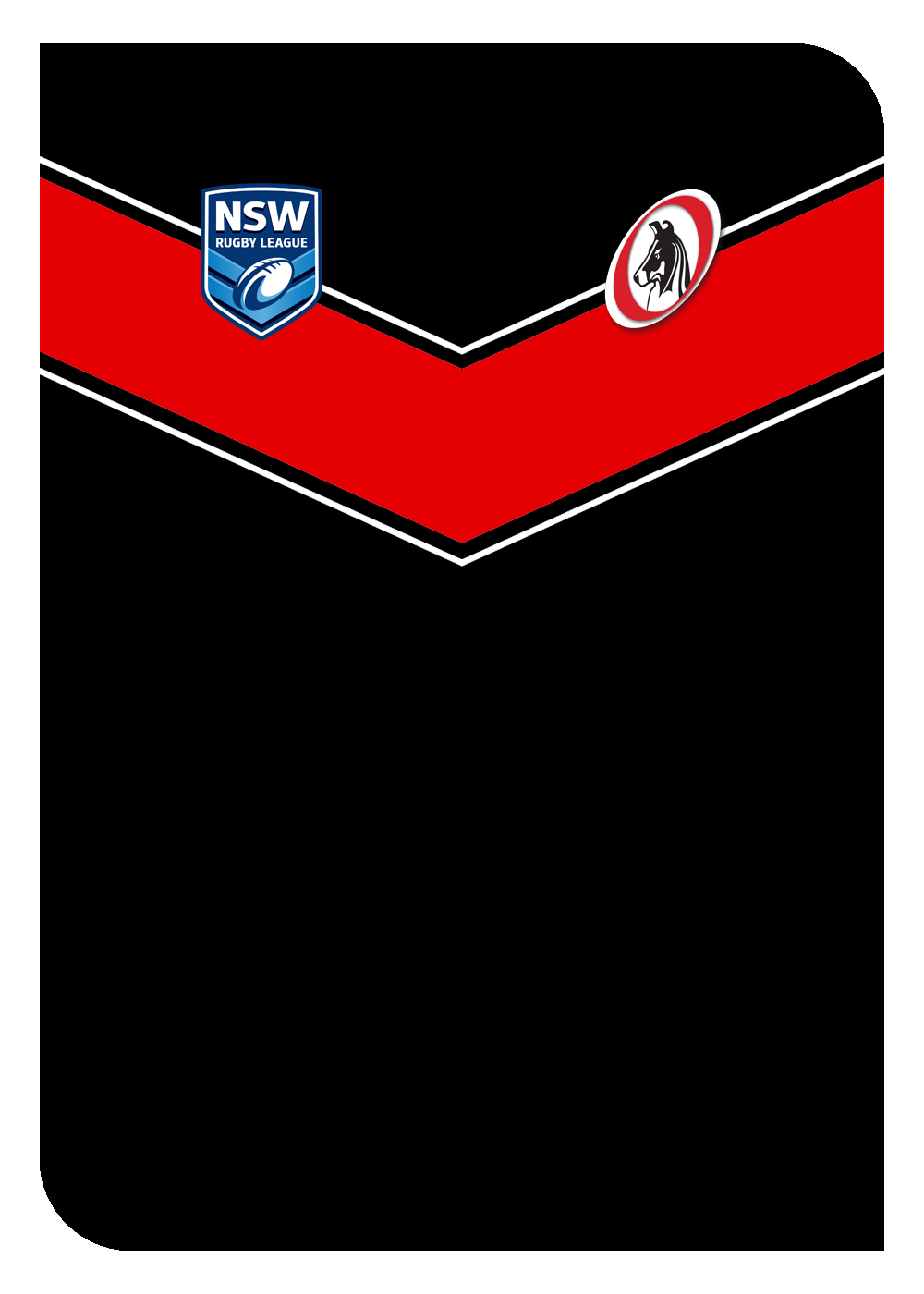
Collegians; Collie Dogs Ground: Collegians Sports Stadium City/Suburb: Wollongong (Figtree) Head coach: Nathan Fien

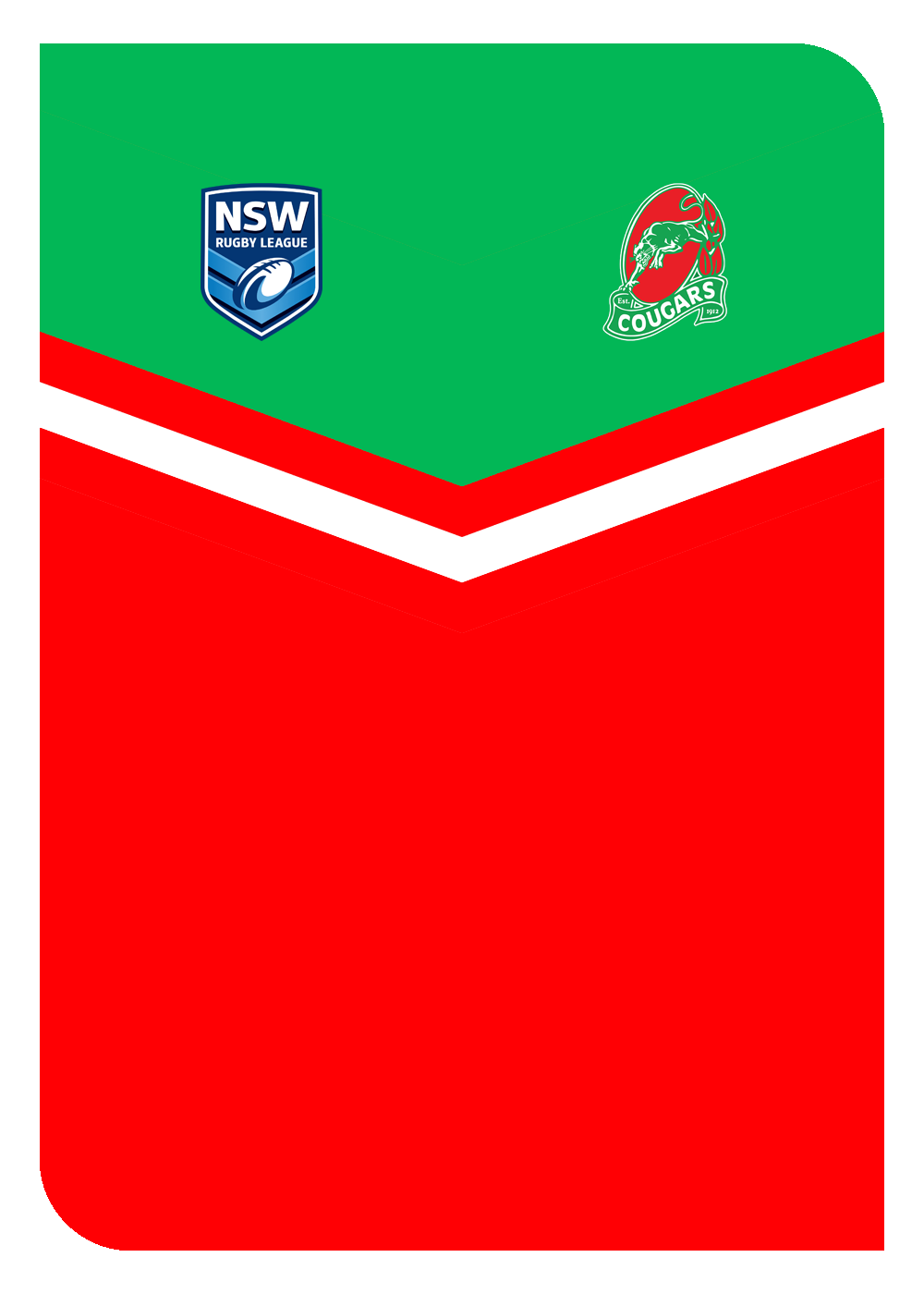
Corrimal; Cougars Ground: Ziems Park City/Suburb: Wollongong (Corrimal) Head coach: Sean Tabet

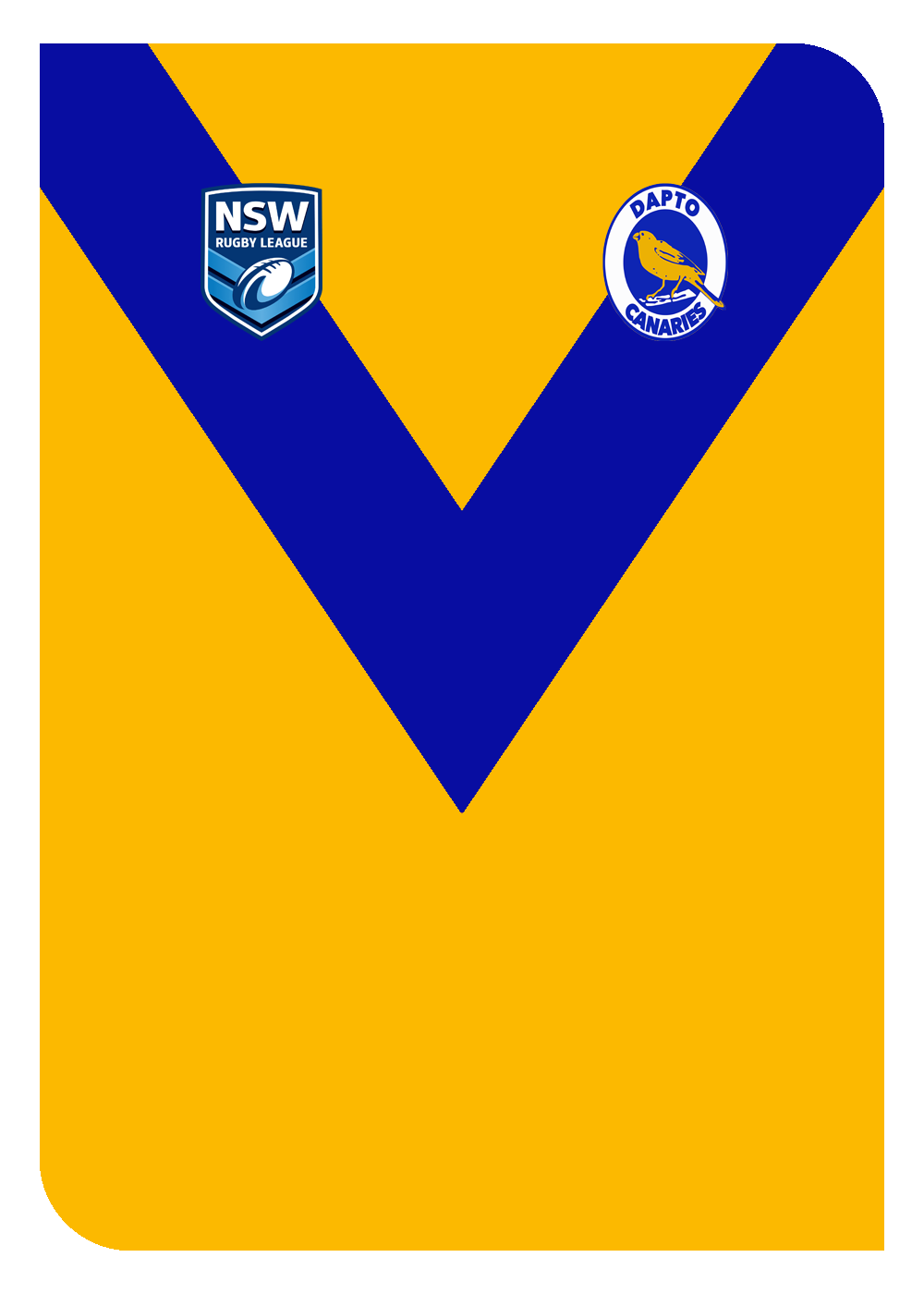
Dapto; Canaries Ground: Dapto Showground City/Suburb: Wollongong (Dapto) Head coach: Blake Wallace

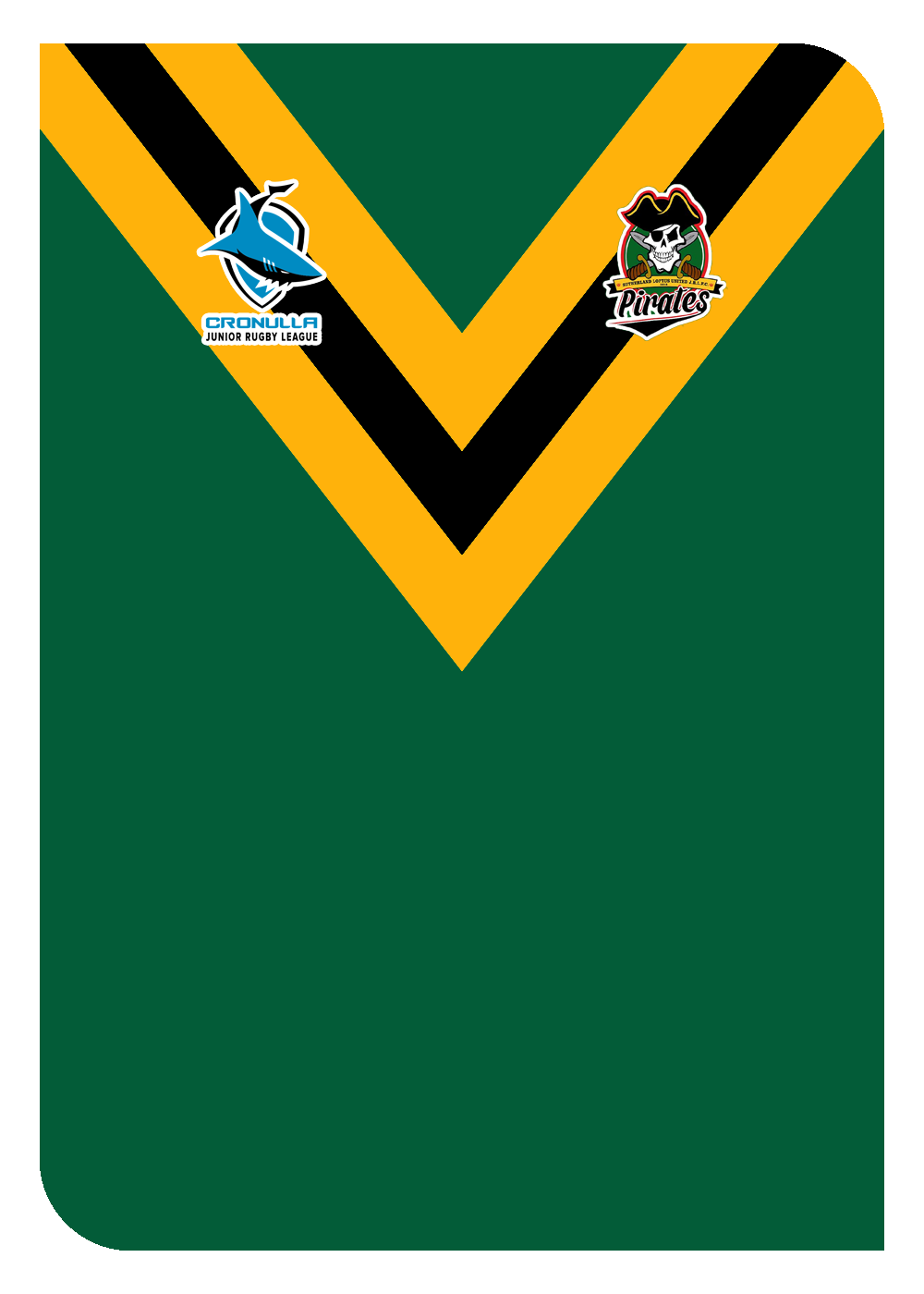
Sutherland-Loftus United; Pirates Ground: Sutherland Oval City/Suburb: Sydney (Sutherland) Head coach: TBA

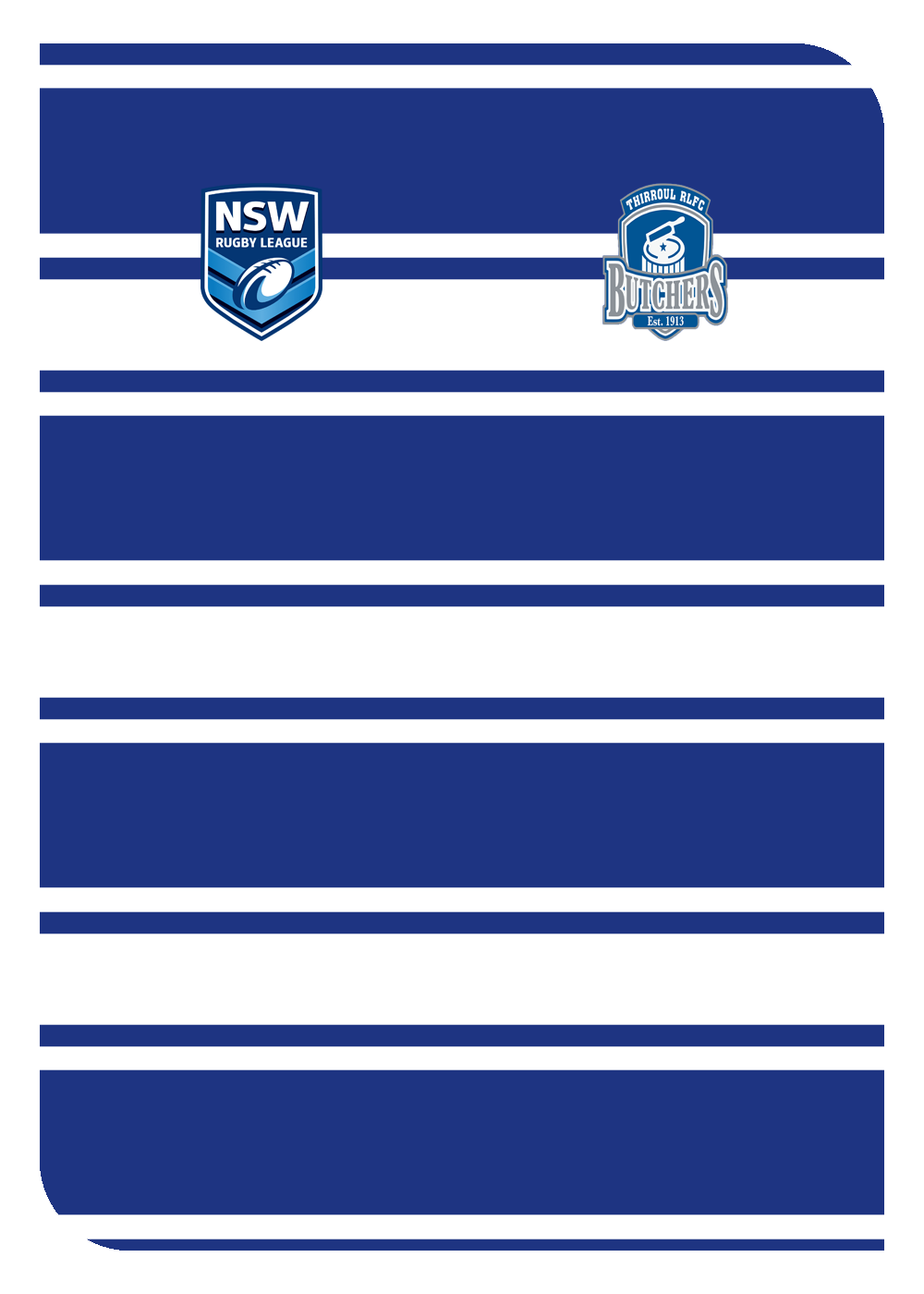
Thirroul; Butchers Ground: Thomas Gibson Park City/Suburb: Wollongong (Thirroul) Head coach: Aaron Beath

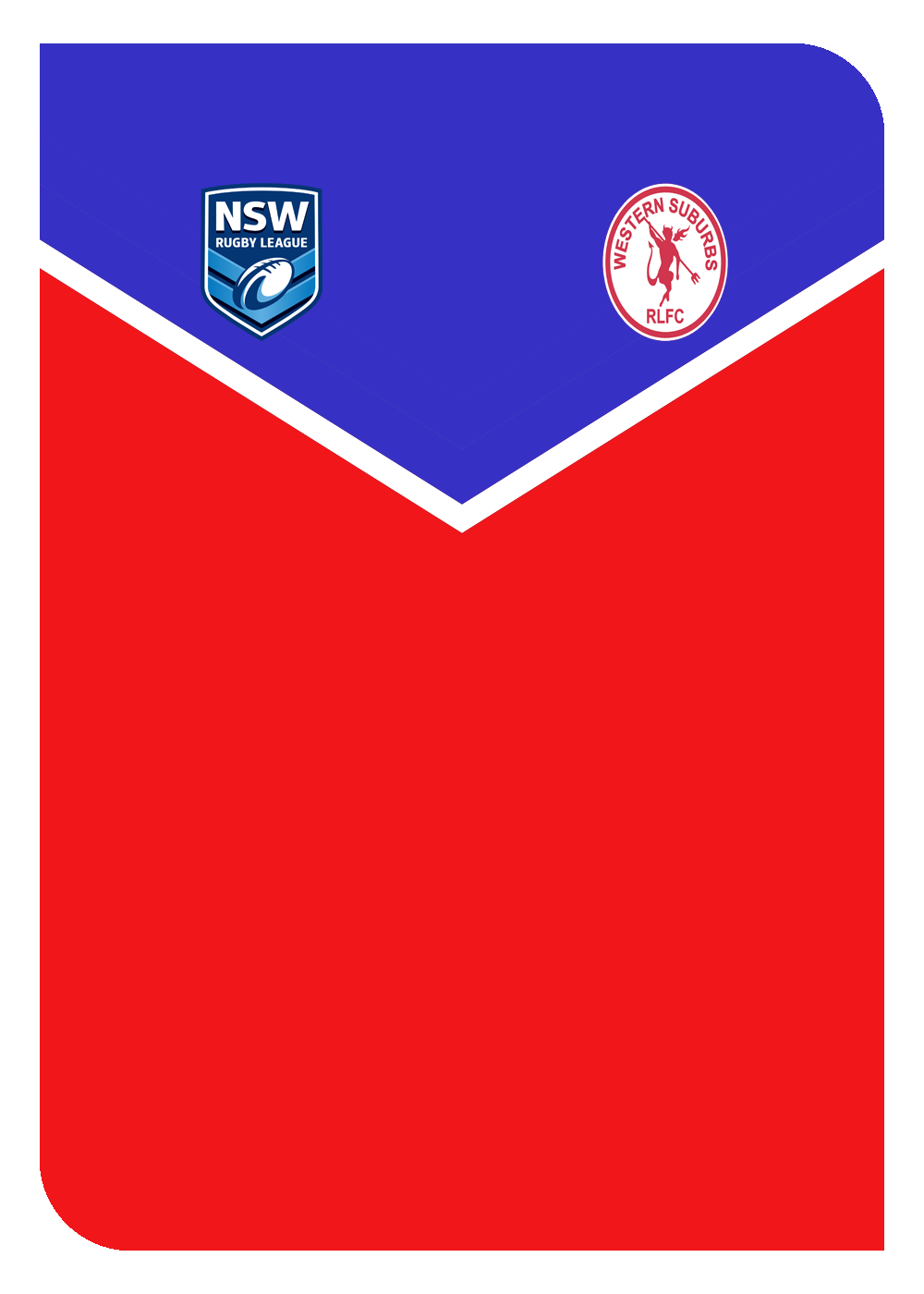
Western Suburbs; Red Devils Ground: Sid Parrish Park City/Suburb: Wollongong (Figtree) Head coach: Peter McLeod

==== Ladder ====
Pos	Team	Pld	W	D	L	B	PF	PA	PD	Pts	Qualification
1	Collegians Collie Dogs	0	0	0	0	0	0	0	0	0	Minor Premiers & Major Semi-Final
2	Corrimal Cougars	0	0	0	0	0	0	0	0	0	Qualifying Final
3	Dapto Canaries	0	0	0	0	0	0	0	0	0	Qualifying Final
4	Sutherland-Loftus United Pirates	0	0	0	0	0	0	0	0	0	Elimination Final
5	Thirroul Butchers	0	0	0	0	0	0	0	0	0	Elimination Final
6	Western Suburbs Red Devils	0	0	0	0	0	0	0	0	0	

Updated to match(es) played on 1 September. Source:
Rules for classification: 1) points; 2) point difference; 3) points scored

===== Ladder progression =====
- Numbers highlighted in green indicate that the team finished the round inside the top 5.
- Numbers highlighted in blue indicates the team finished first on the ladder in that round.
- Numbers highlighted in red indicates the team finished last place on the ladder in that round.
- Underlined numbers indicate that the team had a bye during that round.

Pos	Team	1	2	3	4	5	6	7	8	9	10	11	12	13	14	15
1	Collegians Collie Dogs															
2	Corrimal Cougars															
3	Dapto Canaries															
4	Sutherland-Loftus United Pirates															
5	Thirroul Butchers															
6	Western Suburbs Red Devils															

Season Results:

Home	Score	Away	Match Information
Home	Score	Away	Date and Time	Venue	Referee	Video
Round 1 (ANZAC Round)
Dapto Canaries	V	Corrimal Cougars	Saturday, 25 April, 3:00pm	Dapto Showground	TBA
Collegians Collie Dogs	V	Western Suburbs Red Devils	Saturday, 25 April, 7:30pm	Collegians Sports Stadium	TBA
Sutherland-Loftus United Pirates	V	Thirroul Butchers	Sunday, 26 April, 3:00pm	Sutherland Oval	TBA
Round 2
Corrimal Cougars	V	Thirroul Butchers	Saturday, 2 May, 3:00pm	Ziems Park	TBA
Dapto Canaries	V	Western Suburbs Red Devils	Saturday, 2 May, 3:00pm	Dapto Showground	TBA
Collegians Collie Dogs	V	Sutherland-Loftus United Pirates	Saturday, 2 May, 3:00pm	Collegians Sports Stadium	TBA
Round 3
Western Suburbs Red Devils	V	Corrimal Cougars	Friday, 8 May, 7:00pm	Sid Parrish Park	TBA
Thirroul Butchers	V	Collegians Collie Dogs	Saturday, 9 May, 3:00pm	Thomas Gibson Park	TBA
Sutherland-Loftus United Pirates	V	Dapto Canaries	Sunday, 10 May, 3:00pm	Sutherland Oval	TBA
Round 4
Dapto Canaries	V	Thirroul Butchers	Saturday, 23 May, 3:00pm	Dapto Showground	TBA
Sutherland-Loftus United Pirates	V	Western Suburbs Red Devils	Sunday, 24 May, 3:00pm	Sutherland Oval	TBA
Corrimal Cougars	V	Collegians Collie Dogs	Sunday, 24 May, 3:00pm	Ziems Park	TBA
Round 5
Thirroul Butchers	V	Western Suburbs Red Devils	Saturday, 30 May, 3:00pm	Thomas Gibson Park	TBA
Collegians Collie Dogs	V	Dapto Canaries	Saturday, 30 May, 3:00pm	Collegians Sports Stadium	TBA
Corrimal Cougars	V	Sutherland-Loftus United Pirates	Sunday, 31 May, 3:00pm	Ziems Park	TBA
Round 6
Western Suburbs Red Devils	V	Collegians Collie Dogs	Saturday, 13 June, 3:00pm	Sid Parrish Park	TBA
Dapto Canaries	V	Corrimal Cougars	Saturday, 13 June, 3:00pm	Dapto Showground	TBA
Thirroul Butchers	V	Sutherland-Loftus United Pirates	Sunday, 14 June, 2:00pm	Thomas Gibson Park	TBA
Round 7
Corrimal Cougars	V	Thirroul Butchers	Saturday, 20 June, 3:00pm	Ziems Park	TBA
Western Suburbs Red Devils	V	Dapto Canaries	Saturday, 20 June, 3:00pm	Sid Parrish Park	TBA
Sutherland-Loftus United Pirates	V	Collegians Collie Dogs	Sunday, 21 June, 2:00pm	Sutherland Oval	TBA
Round 8
Corrimal Cougars	V	Western Suburbs Red Devils	Saturday, 27 June, 3:00pm	Ziems Park	TBA
Dapto Canaries	V	Sutherland-Loftus United Pirates	Saturday, 27 June, 3:00pm	Dapto Showground	TBA
Thirroul Butchers	V	Collegians Collie Dogs	Saturday, 27 June, 3:00pm	Thomas Gibson Park	TBA
Round 9
Thirroul Butchers	V	Dapto Canaries	Saturday, 4 July, 3:00pm	Thomas Gibson Park	TBA
Collegians Collie Dogs	V	Corrimal Cougars	Saturday, 4 July, 3:00pm	Collegians Sports Stadium	TBA
Sutherland-Loftus United Pirates	V	Western Suburbs Red Devils	Sunday, 5 July, 3:00pm	Sutherland Oval	TBA
Round 10
Corrimal Cougars	V	Sutherland-Loftus United Pirates	Saturday, 18 July, 3:00pm	Ziems Park	TBA
Western Suburbs Red Devils	V	Thirroul Butchers	Saturday, 18 July, 3:00pm	Sid Parrish Park	TBA
Dapto Canaries	V	Collegians Collie Dogs	Saturday, 18 July, 3:00pm	Dapto Showground	TBA
Round 11
Corrimal Cougars	V	Dapto Canaries	Saturday, 25 July, 3:00pm	Ziems Park	TBA
Western Suburbs Red Devils	V	Collegians Collie Dogs	Saturday, 25 July, 3:00pm	Sid Parrish Park	TBA
Thirroul Butchers	V	Sutherland-Loftus United Pirates	Saturday, 25 July, 3:00pm	Thomas Gibson Park	TBA
Round 12
Collegians Collie Dogs	V	Sutherland-Loftus United Pirates	Friday, 31 July, 7:30pm	Collegians Sports Stadium	TBA
Dapto Canaries	V	Western Suburbs Red Devils	Saturday, 1 August, 3:00pm	Dapto Showground	TBA
Thirroul Butchers	V	Corrimal Cougars	Saturday, 1 August, 3:00pm	Thomas Gibson Park	TBA
Round 13
Western Suburbs Red Devils	V	Corrimal Cougars	Saturday, 8 August, 3:00pm	Sid Parrish Park	TBA
Collegians Collie Dogs	V	Thirroul Butchers	Saturday, 8 August, 3:00pm	Collegians Sports Stadium	TBA
Sutherland-Loftus United Pirates	V	Dapto Canaries	Sunday, 9 August, 3:00pm	Sutherland Oval	TBA
Round 14
Corrimal Cougars	V	Collegians Collie Dogs	Saturday, 15 August, 3:00pm	Ziems Park	TBA
Western Suburbs Red Devils	V	Sutherland-Loftus United Pirates	Saturday, 15 August, 3:00pm	Sid Parrish Park	TBA
Dapto Canaries	V	Thirroul Butchers	Sunday, 16 August, 3:00pm	Dapto Showground	TBA
Round 15
Thirroul Butchers	V	Western Suburbs Red Devils	Saturday, 22 August, 3:00pm	Thomas Gibson Park	TBA
Collegians Collie Dogs	V	Dapto Canaries	Saturday, 22 August, 3:00pm	Collegians Sports Stadium	TBA
Sutherland-Loftus United Pirates	V	Corrimal Cougars	Sunday, 23 August, 3:00pm	Sutherland Oval	TBA
Finals Series
Qualifying & Elimination Finals
2nd Place	V	3rd Place	29/30 August	TBA	TBA
4th Place	V	5th Place	29/30 August	TBA	TBA
Semi-Finals
1st Place	V	QF Winner	5/6 September	TBA	TBA
QF Loser	V	EF Winner	5/6 September	TBA	TBA
Preliminary Final
Major SF Loser	V	Minor SF Winner	12/13 September	TBA	TBA
Grand Final
Major SF Winner	V	PF Winner	19/20 September	WIN Stadium	TBA

==== Grand Final ====
Qualifying & Elimination Finals
2
3
4
5

Major Semi-Final
1
2/3
Minor Semi-Final
2/3
4/5

Preliminary Final
1/2/3
2/3/4/5

Grand Final
1/2/3
1/2/3/4/5

2026 Harrigan Cup Grand Final

19/20 September 2026

Major SF Winner	v	PF Winner

WIN Stadium, Wollongong

== Tier 3 Open Age Competitions ==
=== Sydney Shield ===
2026 Sydney Shield
- Duration: TBA 2026
- Teams: 9

The Sydney Shield is an open-age competition that sits below the Leagues Club Australia Ron Massey Cup in the NSWRL hierarchy. The competition primarily features clubs from across metropolitan Sydney and serves as both a development league and a competitive environment for stand-alone community clubs.

The 2026 competition format, including finals and the participating clubs, will be added once they are confirmed.

==== Teams ====
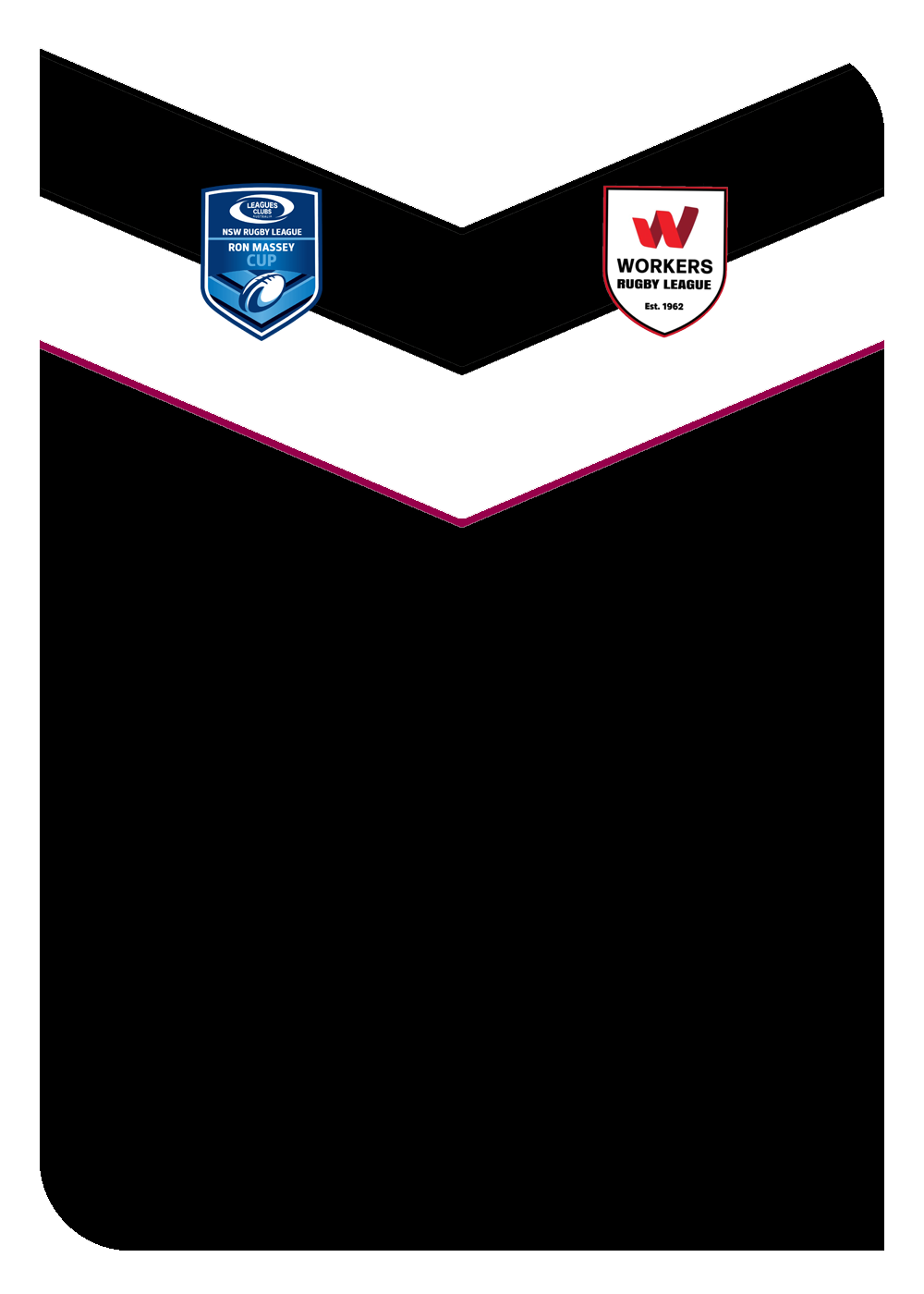
Blacktown Workers Ground: HE Laybutt Sporting Complex City/Suburb: Sydney (Blacktown) Coach: Andrew Brown

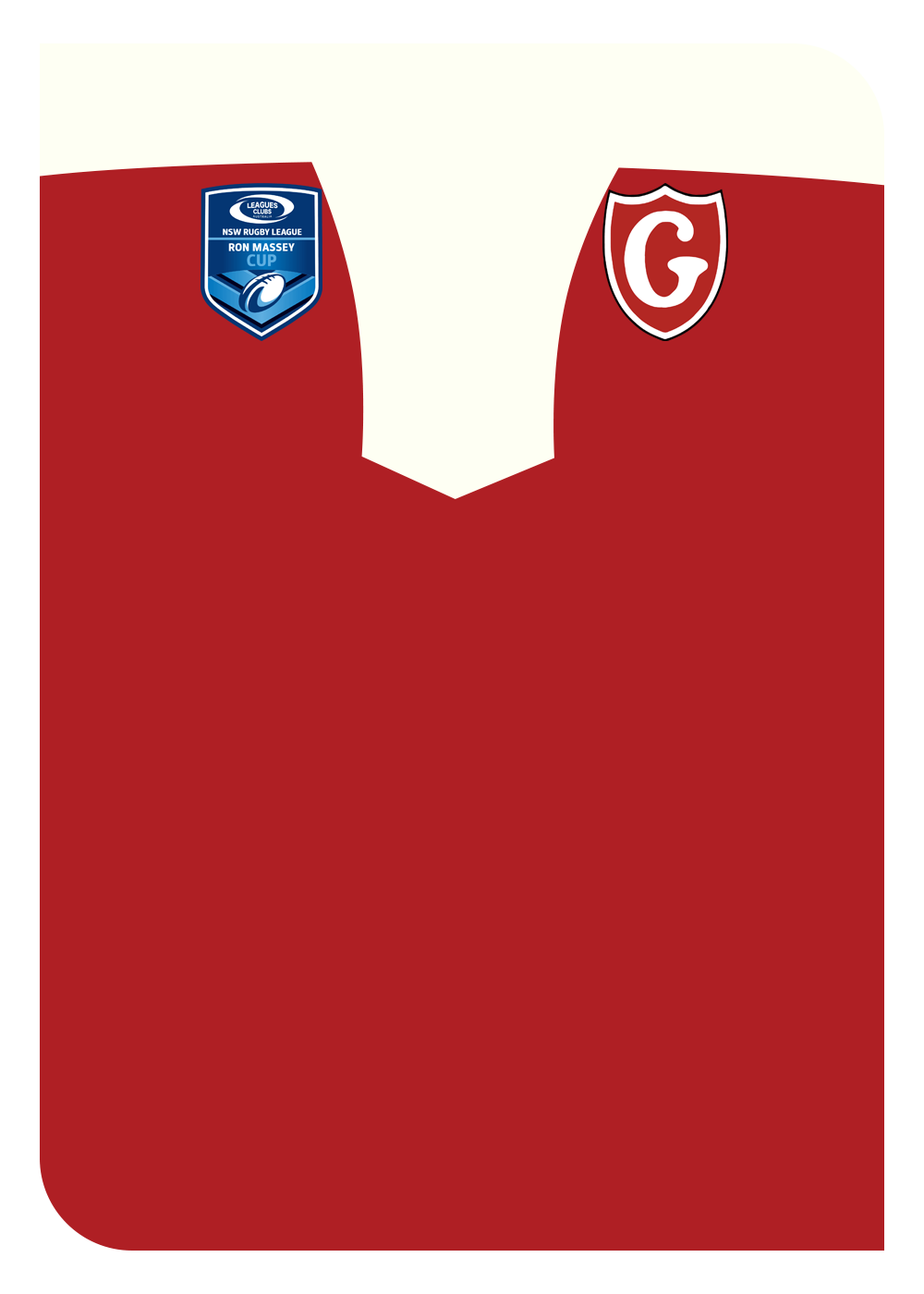
Glebe Dirty Reds Ground: Wentworth Park City/Suburb: Sydney (Glebe) Coach: TBA

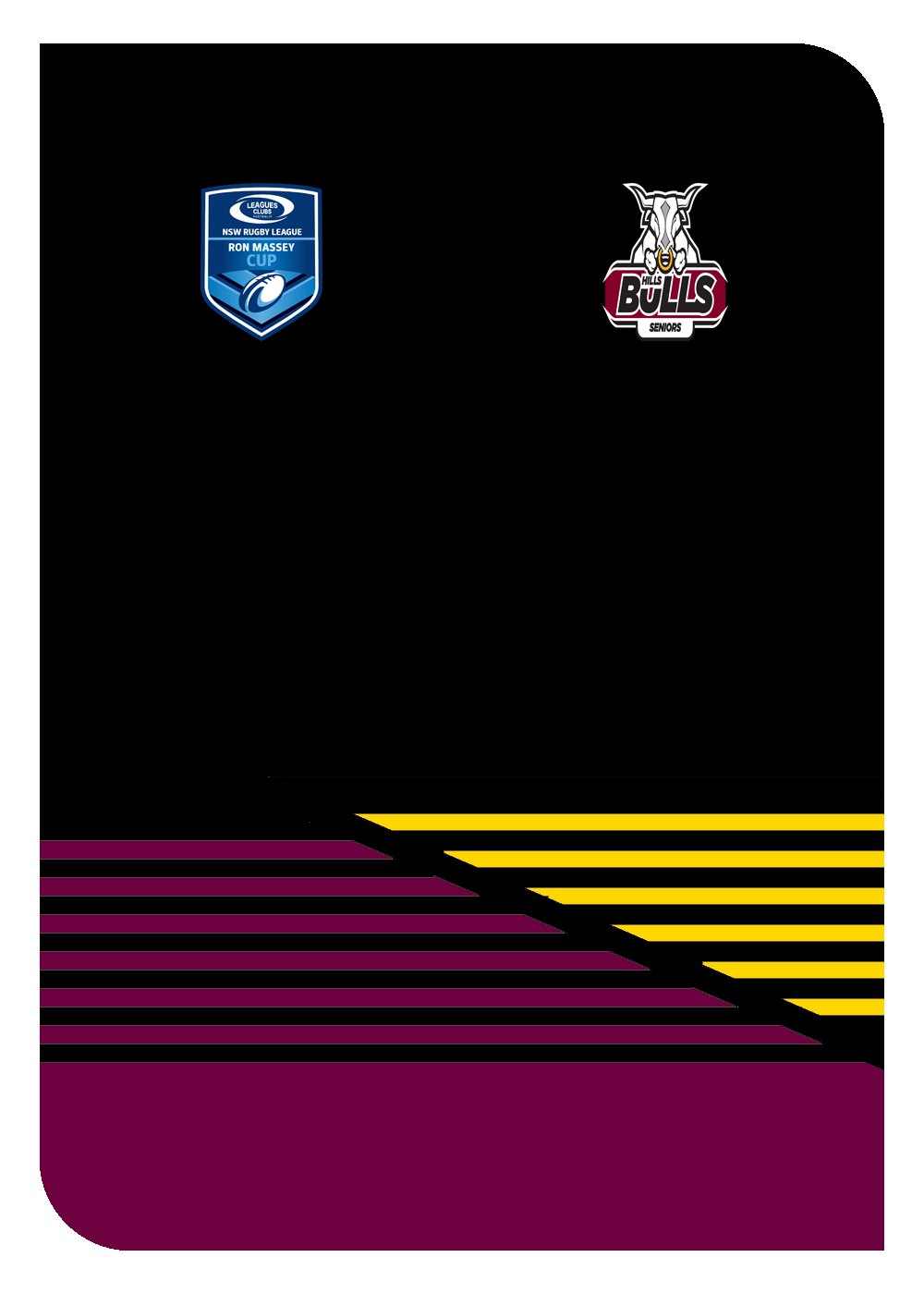
Hills District Bulls Ground: Crestwood Reserve City/Suburb: Sydney (Baulkham Hills) Coach: TBA

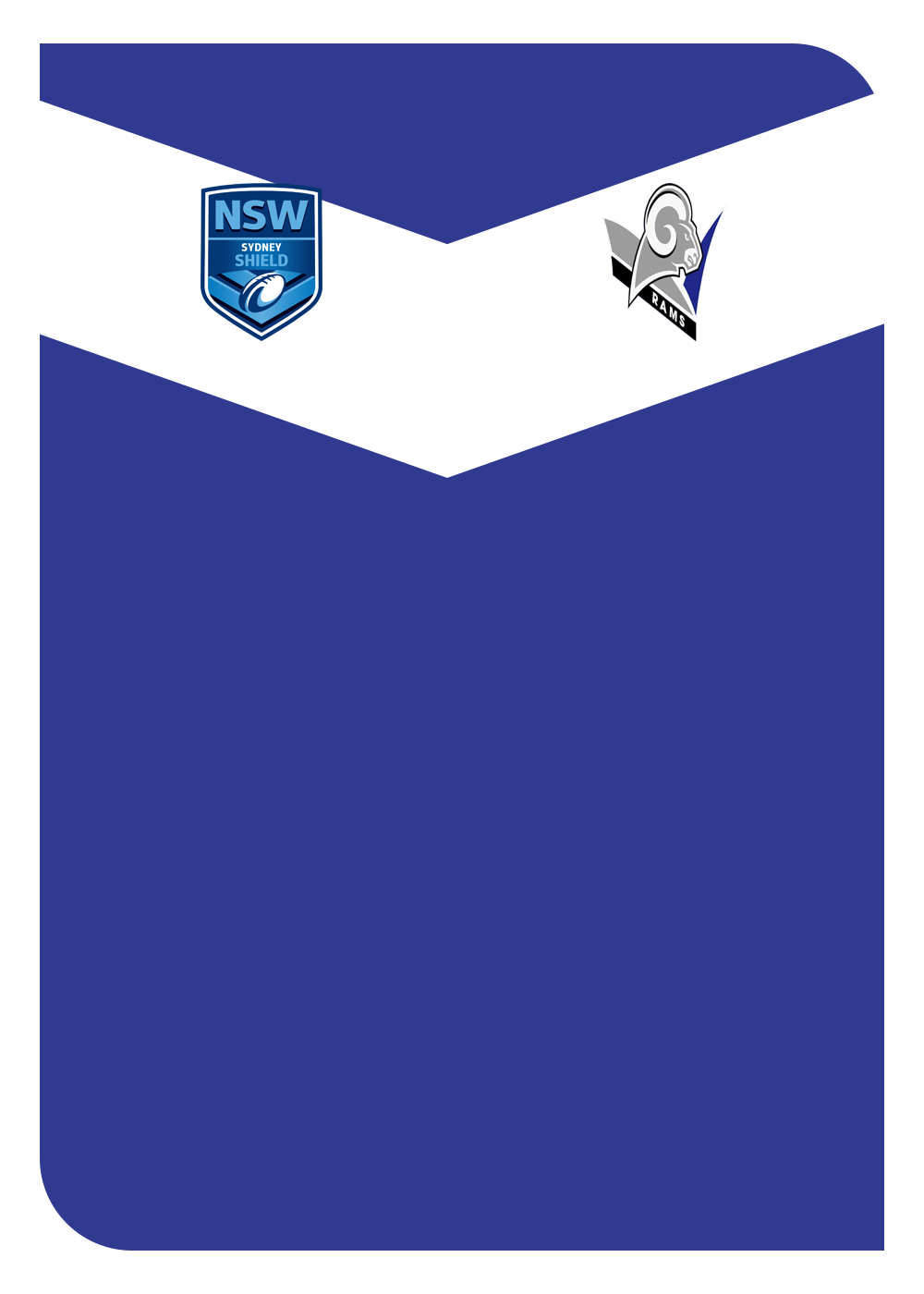
Moorebank Bulls Ground: Hammondville Oval City/Suburb: Sydney (Hammondville) Coach: TBA

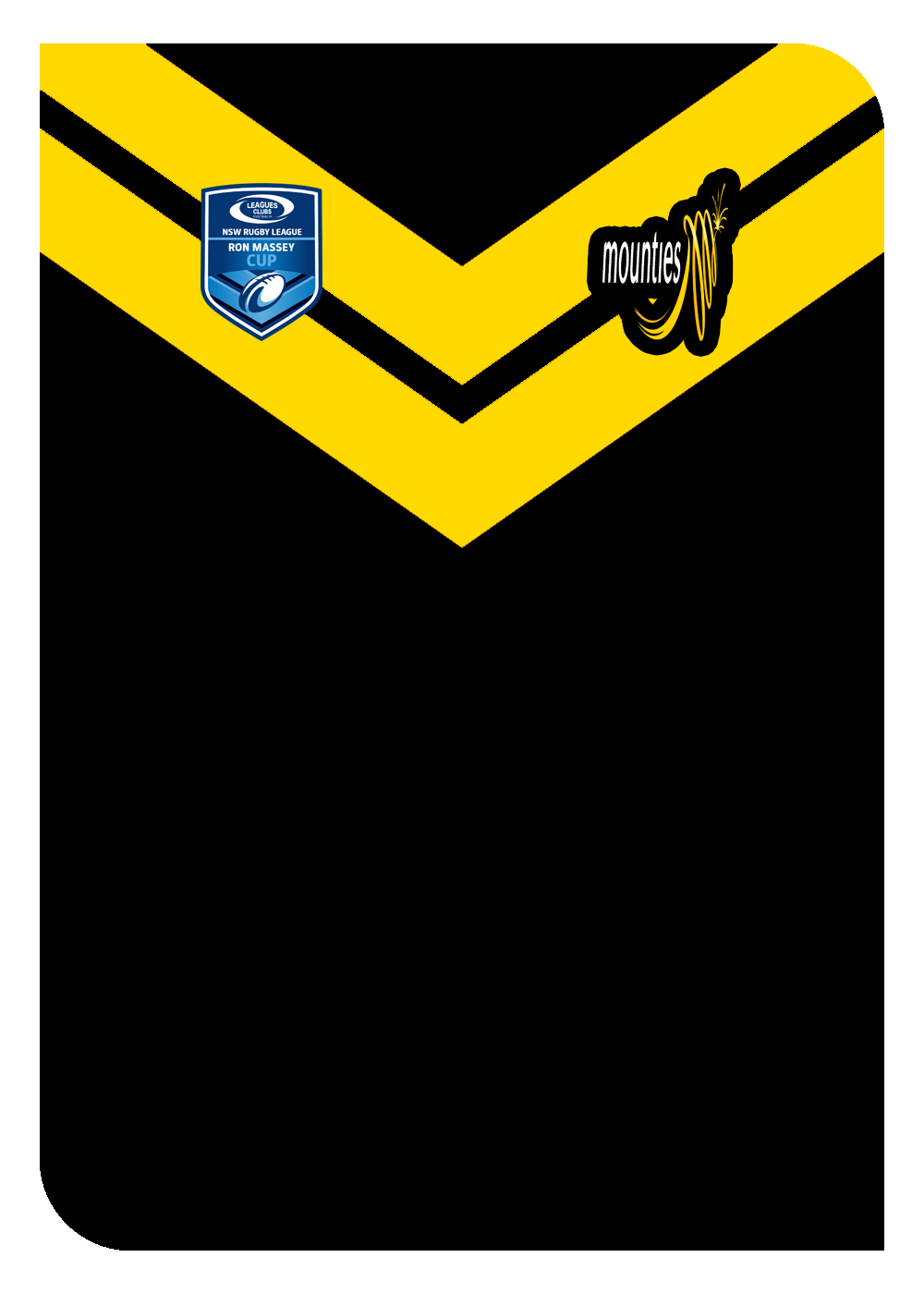
Mount Pritchard Mounties Ground: Aubrey Keech Reserve City/Suburb: Sydney (Hinchinbrook) Coach: TBA

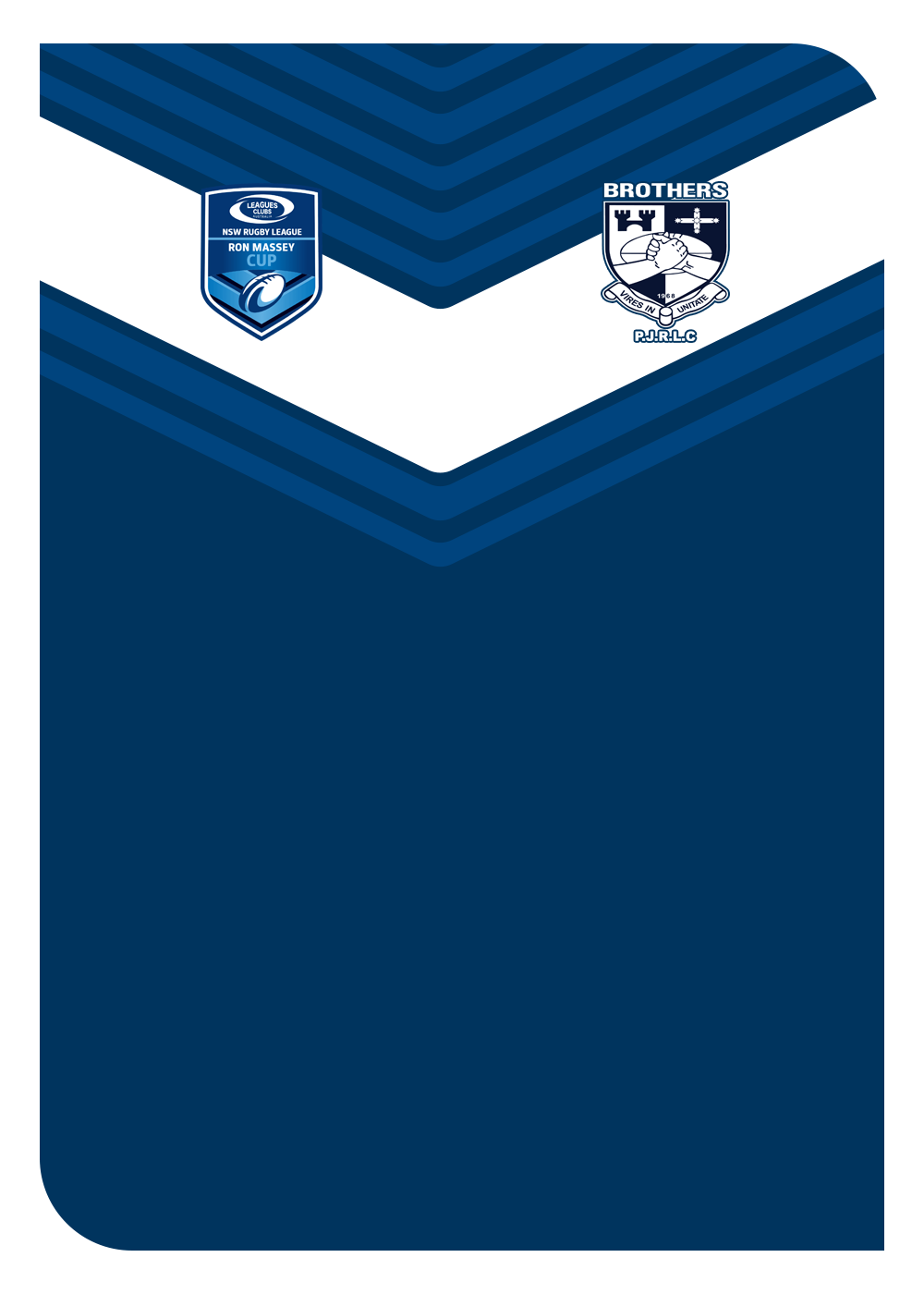
Penrith Brothers Ground: Parker Street Reserve City/Suburb: Sydney (Penrith) Coach: Col Murphy

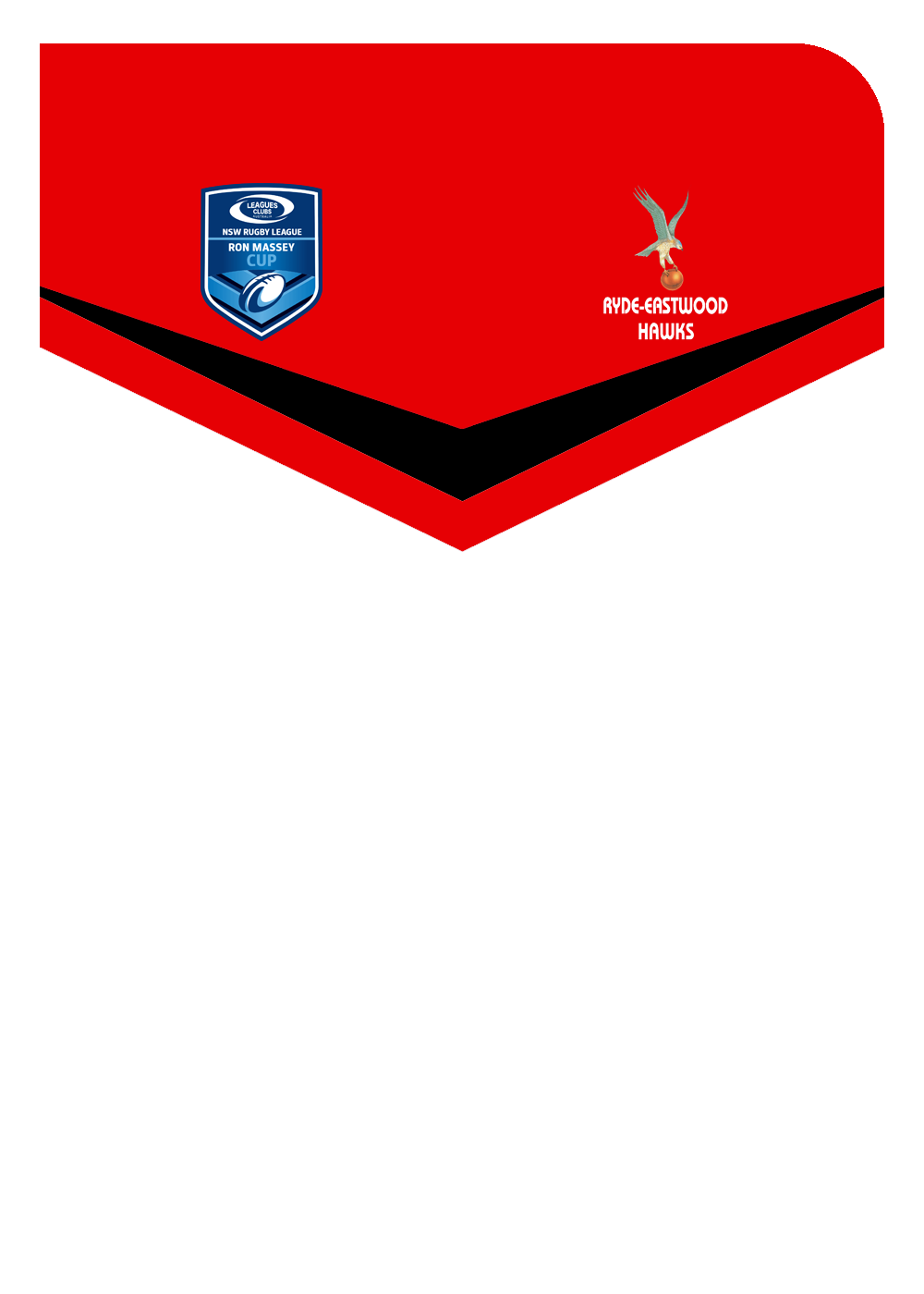
Ryde-Eastwood Hawks Ground: Lidcombe Oval City/Suburb: Sydney (Marsfield) Coach: TBA

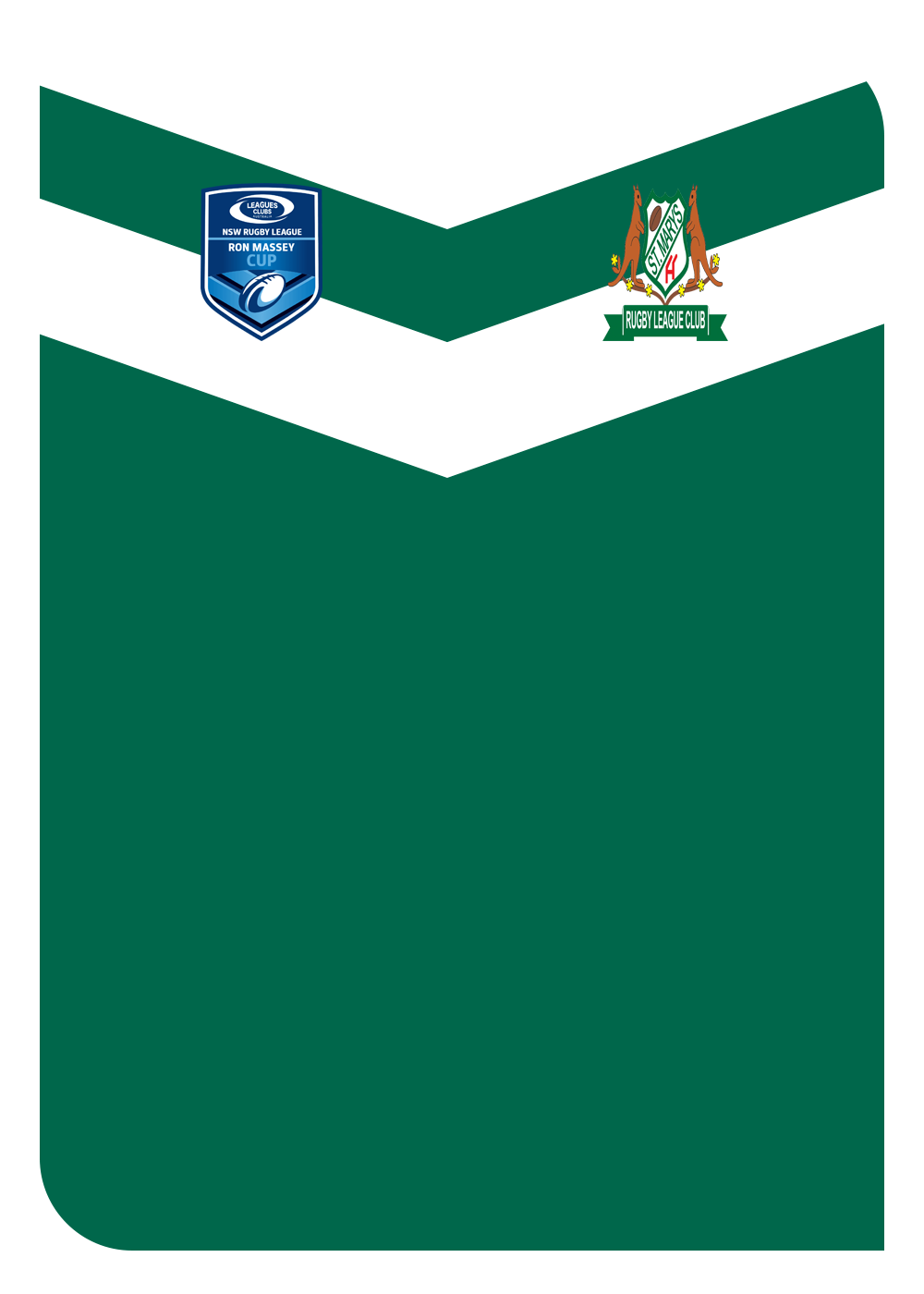
St Marys Saints Ground: St Marys Leagues Stadium City/Suburb: Sydney (St Marys) Coach: Brad Drew

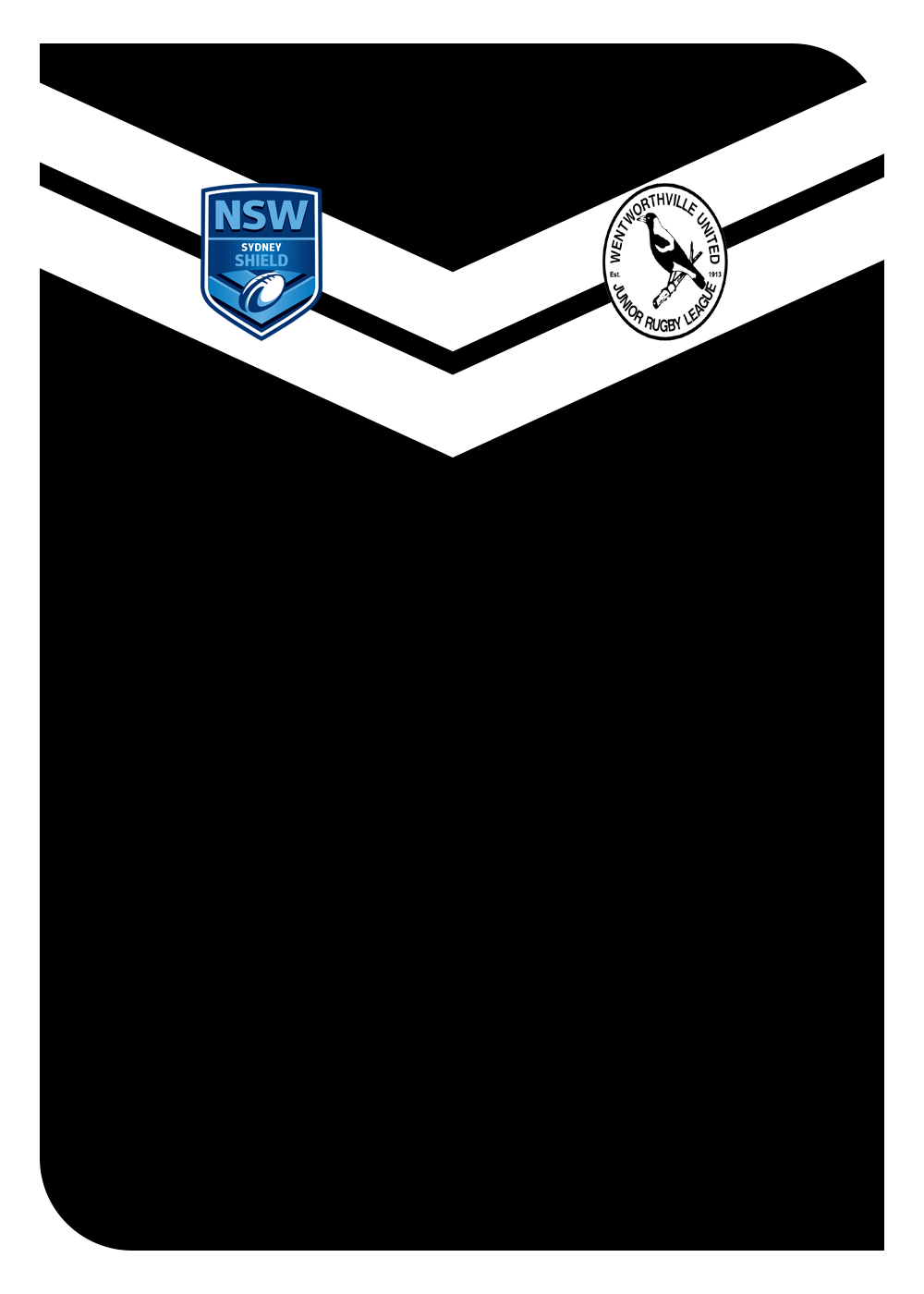
Wentworthville United Ground: Ringrose Park City/Suburb: Sydney (Wentworthville) Coach: Darryl Hamilton

==== Ladder ====
Pos	Team	Pld	W	D	L	B	PF	PA	PD	Pts	Qualification
1	Mount Pritchard Mounties (R)	2	2	0	0	0	88	6	+82	4	Minor Premiers & Major Semi-Final
2	Ryde-Eastwood Hawks (R)	2	2	0	0	0	48	22	+26	4	Qualifying Final
3	St Marys Saints (R)	2	1	1	0	0	46	44	+2	3	Qualifying Final
4	Blacktown Workers (R)	2	1	0	1	0	76	40	+36	2	Elimination Final
5	Glebe Dirty Reds (R)	2	1	0	1	0	50	46	+4	2	Elimination Final
6	Penrith Brothers (R)	1	0	0	1	1	22	28	–6	2	
7	Wentworthville United	1	0	0	1	1	0	48	–48	2	
8	Hills District Bulls (R)	2	0	1	1	0	38	44	–6	1	
9	Moorebank Rams	2	0	0	2	0	20	110	–90	0	

Updated to match(es) played on 1 September. Source:
Rules for classification: 1) points; 2) point difference; 3) points scored

===== Ladder progression =====
- Numbers highlighted in green indicate that the team finished the round inside the top 5.
- Numbers highlighted in blue indicates the team finished first on the ladder in that round.
- Numbers highlighted in red indicates the team finished last place on the ladder in that round.
- Underlined numbers indicate that the team had a bye during that round.

Pos	Team	2	1	3	4	5	6	7	8	9	10	11	12	13	14	15	16	17	18
1	Mount Pritchard Mounties (R)	4	4																
2	Ryde-Eastwood Hawks (R)	4	4																
3	St Marys Saints (R)	2	3																
4	Blacktown Workers (R)	2	2																
5	Glebe Dirty Reds (R)	2	2																
6	Penrith Brothers (R)	2	2																
7	Wentworthville United	2	2																
8	Hills District Bulls (R)	0	1																
9	Moorebank Rams	0	0																

Season Results:

Home	Score	Away	Match Information
Home	Score	Away	Date and Time	Venue	Referee	Video
Round 1
Glebe Dirty Reds (R)	28 – 22	Penrith Brothers (R)	Saturday, 21 March, 12:00pm	Wentworth Park	Karra-Lee Nolan
Mount Pritchard Mounties (R)	40 – 6	Moorebank Rams	Saturday, 21 March, 3:00pm	Aubrey Keech Reserve	Adam Sirianni
Ryde-Eastwood Hawks (R)	26 – 6	Blacktown Workers (R)	Saturday, 21 March, 3:00pm	Lidcombe Oval	Gage Miles
St Marys Saints (R)	22 – 22	Hills District Bulls (R)	Thursday, 2 April, 6:30pm	St Marys Leagues Stadium	Adam Sirianni
Wentworthville United		BYE
Round 2
Ryde-Eastwood Hawks (R)	22 – 16	Hills District Bulls (R)	Saturday, 28 March, 12:00pm	Lidcombe Oval	Adam Sirianni
Mount Pritchard Mounties (R)	48 – 0	Wentworthville United	Saturday, 28 March, 1:00pm	Aubrey Keech Reserve	Gage Miles
Moorebank Rams	14 – 70	Blacktown Workers (R)	Saturday, 28 March, 3:00pm	Hammondville Oval	Blake Williams
St Marys Saints (R)	24 – 22	Glebe Dirty Reds (R)	Sunday, 29 March, 1:00pm	St Marys Leagues Stadium	Mitchell Pitscheider
Penrith Brothers (R)		BYE
Round 3
Ryde-Eastwood Hawks (R)	8 – 50	St Marys Saints (R)	Saturday, 11 April, 11:00am	Lidcombe Oval	TBA
Penrith Brothers (R)	26 – 34	Mount Pritchard Mounties (R)	Saturday, 11 April, 3:30pm	Parker Street Reserve	TBA
Wentworthville United	26 – 28	Glebe Dirty Reds (R)	Sunday, 12 April, 12:00pm	Ringrose Park	TBA
Hills District Bulls (R)	40 – 22	Blacktown Workers (R)	Sunday, 12 April, 1:00pm	Crestwood Reserve	TBA
Moorebank Rams		BYE
Round 4
Glebe Dirty Reds (R)	V	Moorebank Rams	Saturday, 18 April, TBA	TBA	TBA
Wentworthville United	V	Penrith Brothers (R)	Sunday, 19 April, 12:00pm	Ringrose Park	TBA
Blacktown Workers (R)	V	St Marys Saints (R)	Sunday, 19 April, 1:00pm	HE Laybutt Sporting Complex	TBA
Hills District Bulls (R)	V	Mount Pritchard Mounties (R)	Sunday, 19 April, 1:00pm	Crestwood Reserve	TBA
Ryde-Eastwood Hawks (R)		BYE
Round 5 (ANZAC Round)
Wentworthville United	V	Moorebank Rams	Sunday, 26 April, 12:00pm	Ringrose Park	TBA
Ryde-Eastwood Hawks (R)	V	Mount Pritchard Mounties (R)	Sunday, 26 April, 1:00pm	TBA	TBA
Hills District Bulls (R)	V	Glebe Dirty Reds (R)	Sunday, 26 April, 1:00pm	Crestwood Reserve	TBA
Blacktown Workers (R)	V	Penrith Brothers (R)	Sunday, 26 April, 1:00pm	HE Laybutt Sporting Complex	TBA
St Marys Saints (R)		BYE
Round 6
St Marys Saints (R)	V	Wentworthville United	Saturday, 2 May, 2:00pm	St Marys Leagues Stadium	TBA
Penrith Brothers (R)	V	Ryde-Eastwood Hawks (R)	Saturday, 2 May, 3:30pm	Parker Street Reserve	TBA
Moorebank Rams	V	Hills District Bulls (R)	Saturday, 2 May, 4:00pm	Hammondville Oval	TBA
Glebe Dirty Reds (R)	V	Blacktown Workers (R)	Saturday, 2 May, TBA	TBA	TBA
Mount Pritchard Mounties (R)		BYE
Round 7
Ryde-Eastwood Hawks (R)	V	Moorebank Rams	Saturday, 9 May, 12:00pm	Lidcombe Oval	TBA
Mount Pritchard Mounties (R)	V	Glebe Dirty Reds (R)	Saturday, 9 May, 1:00pm	Aubrey Keech Reserve	TBA
St Marys Saints (R)	V	Penrith Brothers (R)	Saturday, 9 May, 2:00pm	St Marys Leagues Stadium	TBA
Blacktown Workers (R)	V	Wentworthville United	Sunday, 10 May, 1:00pm	HE Laybutt Sporting Complex	TBA
Hills District Bulls (R)		BYE
Round 8
Moorebank Rams	V	St Marys Saints (R)	Saturday, 23 May, 4:00pm	Hammondville Oval	TBA
Glebe Dirty Reds (R)	V	Ryde-Eastwood Hawks (R)	Sunday, 24 May, 12:00pm	Wentworth Park	TBA
Wentworthville United	V	Mount Pritchard Mounties (R)	Sunday, 24 May, 1:00pm	Ringrose Park	TBA
Hills District Bulls (R)	V	Penrith Brothers (R)	Sunday, 24 May, 1:00pm	Crestwood Reserve	TBA
Blacktown Workers (R)		BYE
Round 9
Mount Pritchard Mounties (R)	V	St Marys Saints (R)	Saturday, 30 May, 1:00pm	Aubrey Keech Reserve	TBA
Penrith Brothers (R)	V	Moorebank Rams	Saturday, 30 May, 3:30pm	Parker Street Reserve	TBA
Blacktown Workers (R)	V	Ryde-Eastwood Hawks (R)	Sunday, 31 May, 1:00pm	HE Laybutt Sporting Complex	TBA
Hills District Bulls (R)	V	Wentworthville United	Sunday, 31 May, 1:00pm	Crestwood Reserve	TBA
Glebe Dirty Reds (R)		BYE
Round 10
Penrith Brothers (R)	V	Glebe Dirty Reds (R)	Saturday, 13 June, 3:30pm	Parker Street Reserve	TBA
Ryde-Eastwood Hawks (R)	V	Wentworthville United	Saturday, 13 June, TBA	TBA	TBA
Hills District Bulls (R)	V	St Marys Saints (R)	Sunday, 14 June, 1:00pm	Crestwood Reserve	TBA
Blacktown Workers (R)	V	Mount Pritchard Mounties (R)	Sunday, 14 June, 1:00pm	HE Laybutt Sporting Complex	TBA
Moorebank Rams		BYE
Round 11
Mount Pritchard Mounties (R)	V	Penrith Brothers (R)	Sunday, 21 June, 1:00pm	Aubrey Keech Reserve	TBA
Blacktown Workers (R)	V	Moorebank Rams	Sunday, 21 June, 1:00pm	HE Laybutt Sporting Complex	TBA
Glebe Dirty Reds (R)	V	Hills District Bulls (R)	Sunday, 21 June, 2:00pm	Wentworth Park	TBA
St Marys Saints (R)	V	Ryde-Eastwood Hawks (R)	Sunday, 21 June, 3:00pm	St Marys Leagues Stadium	TBA
Wentworthville United		BYE
Round 12
Mount Pritchard Mounties (R)	V	Ryde-Eastwood Hawks (R)	Saturday, 27 June, 12:30pm	Aubrey Keech Reserve	TBA
Penrith Brothers (R)	V	Wentworthville United	Saturday, 27 June, 1:00pm	Parker Street Reserve	TBA
Hills District Bulls (R)	V	Moorebank Rams	Sunday, 28 June, 1:00pm	Crestwood Reserve	TBA
Blacktown Workers (R)	V	Glebe Dirty Reds (R)	Sunday, 28 June, 1:00pm	HE Laybutt Sporting Complex	TBA
St Marys Saints (R)		BYE
Round 13
Mount Pritchard Mounties (R)	V	Hills District Bulls (R)	Saturday, 4 July, 12:30pm	Aubrey Keech Reserve	TBA
Moorebank Rams	V	Ryde-Eastwood Hawks (R)	Saturday, 4 July, 4:00pm	Hammondville Oval	TBA
Glebe Dirty Reds (R)	V	St Marys Saints (R)	Sunday, 5 July, 12:00pm	Wentworth Park	TBA
Wentworthville United	V	Blacktown Workers (R)	Sunday, 5 July, 1:00pm	Ringrose Park	TBA
Penrith Brothers (R)		BYE
Round 14
St Marys Saints (R)	V	Blacktown Workers (R)	Saturday, 11 July, 1:00pm	St Marys Leagues Stadium	TBA
Penrith Brothers (R)	V	Hills District Bulls (R)	Saturday, 11 July, 3:30pm	Parker Street Reserve	TBA
Moorebank Rams	V	Mount Pritchard Mounties (R)	Saturday, 11 July, 4:00pm	Hammondville Oval	TBA
Glebe Dirty Reds (R)	V	Wentworthville United	Saturday, 11 July, TBA	TBA	TBA
Ryde-Eastwood Hawks (R)		BYE
Round 15
Moorebank Rams	V	Penrith Brothers (R)	Saturday, 18 July, 4:00pm	Hammondville Oval	TBA
Glebe Dirty Reds (R)	V	Mount Pritchard Mounties (R)	Saturday, 18 July, TBA	TBA	TBA
Wentworthville United	V	St Marys Saints (R)	Sunday, 19 July, 1:00pm	Ringrose Park	TBA
Hills District Bulls (R)	V	Ryde-Eastwood Hawks (R)	Sunday, 19 July, 1:00pm	Crestwood Reserve	TBA
Blacktown Workers (R)		BYE
Round 16
Penrith Brothers (R)	V	St Marys Saints (R)	Saturday, 25 July, 3:30pm	Parker Street Reserve	TBA
Moorebank Rams	V	Glebe Dirty Reds (R)	Saturday, 25 July, 4:00pm	Hammondville Oval	TBA
Wentworthville United	V	Ryde-Eastwood Hawks (R)	Sunday, 26 July, 1:00pm	Ringrose Park	TBA
Blacktown Workers (R)	V	Hills District Bulls (R)	Sunday, 26 July, 1:00pm	HE Laybutt Sporting Complex	TBA
Mount Pritchard Mounties (R)		BYE
Round 17
Ryde-Eastwood Hawks (R)	V	Penrith Brothers (R)	Saturday, 1 August, 12:00pm	Leichhardt Oval	TBA
St Marys Saints (R)	V	Moorebank Rams	Saturday, 1 August, 1:00pm	St Marys Leagues Stadium	TBA
Mount Pritchard Mounties (R)	V	Blacktown Workers (R)	Saturday, 1 August, 2:30pm	Aubrey Keech Reserve	TBA
Wentworthville United	V	Hills District Bulls (R)	Saturday, 1 August, 4:00pm	Ringrose Park	TBA
Glebe Dirty Reds (R)		BYE
Round 18
Penrith Brothers (R)	V	Blacktown Workers (R)	Friday, 7 August, 5:30pm	Parker Street Reserve	TBA
Ryde-Eastwood Hawks (R)	V	Glebe Dirty Reds (R)	Saturday, 8 August, 12:00pm	Lidcombe Oval	TBA
St Marys Saints (R)	V	Mount Pritchard Mounties (R)	Saturday, 8 August, 1:00pm	St Marys Leagues Stadium	TBA
Moorebank Rams	V	Wentworthville United	Saturday, 8 August, 4:00pm	Hammondville Oval	TBA
Hills District Bulls (R)		BYE
Finals Series
Qualifying & Elimination Finals
2nd Place	V	3rd Place	15/16 August	TBA	TBA
4th Place	V	5th Place	15/16 August	TBA	TBA
Semi-Finals
1st Place	V	QF Winner	22/23 August	TBA	TBA
QF Loser	V	EF Winner	22/23 August	TBA	TBA
Preliminary Final
Major SF Loser	V	Minor SF Winner	29/30 August	TBA	TBA
Grand Final
Major SF Winner	V	PF Winner	5/6 September	TBA	TBA

==== Grand Final ====
Qualifying & Elimination Finals
2
3
4
5

Major Semi-Final
1
2/3
Minor Semi-Final
2/3
4/5

Preliminary Final
1/2/3
2/3/4/5

Grand Final
1/2/3
1/2/3/4/5

2026 Sydney Shield Grand Final

5/6 September
TBA

Major SF Winner	v	PF Winner

TBA

=== Men's Country Championships ===
2026 Men's Country Championships
- Duration: 28 February – 28 March 2026
- Teams: 10
- Broadcast partners: Streaming; BarTV Sports (All Matches)

The Men's Country Championships is an open-age representative competition featuring teams selected from regional New South Wales. The tournament brings together the best players from country leagues to represent their local regions and showcase their abilities in a state-level environment, forming a key part of the NSWRL's regional pathway.

Details of the 2026 Men's Country Championships structure, participating regions and venues will be listed when confirmed.

==== Teams ====
===== Club Changes =====
- Illawarra-South Coast Dragons rennamed to Illawarra-South Coast Steelers for 2026.

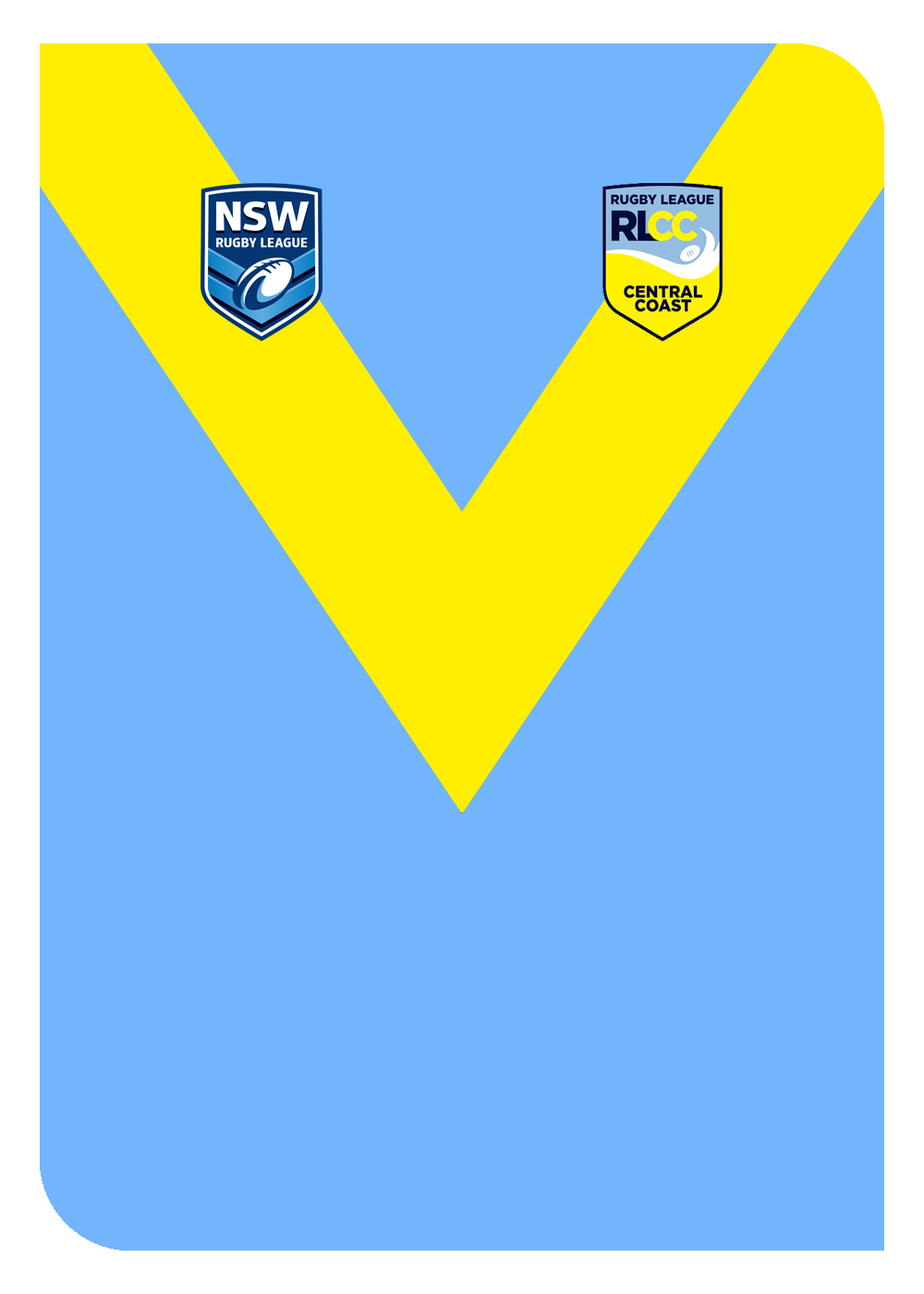
Central Coast; Roosters Ground: Woy Woy Oval City/Suburb: Woy Woy (Woy Woy) Head coach: TBA

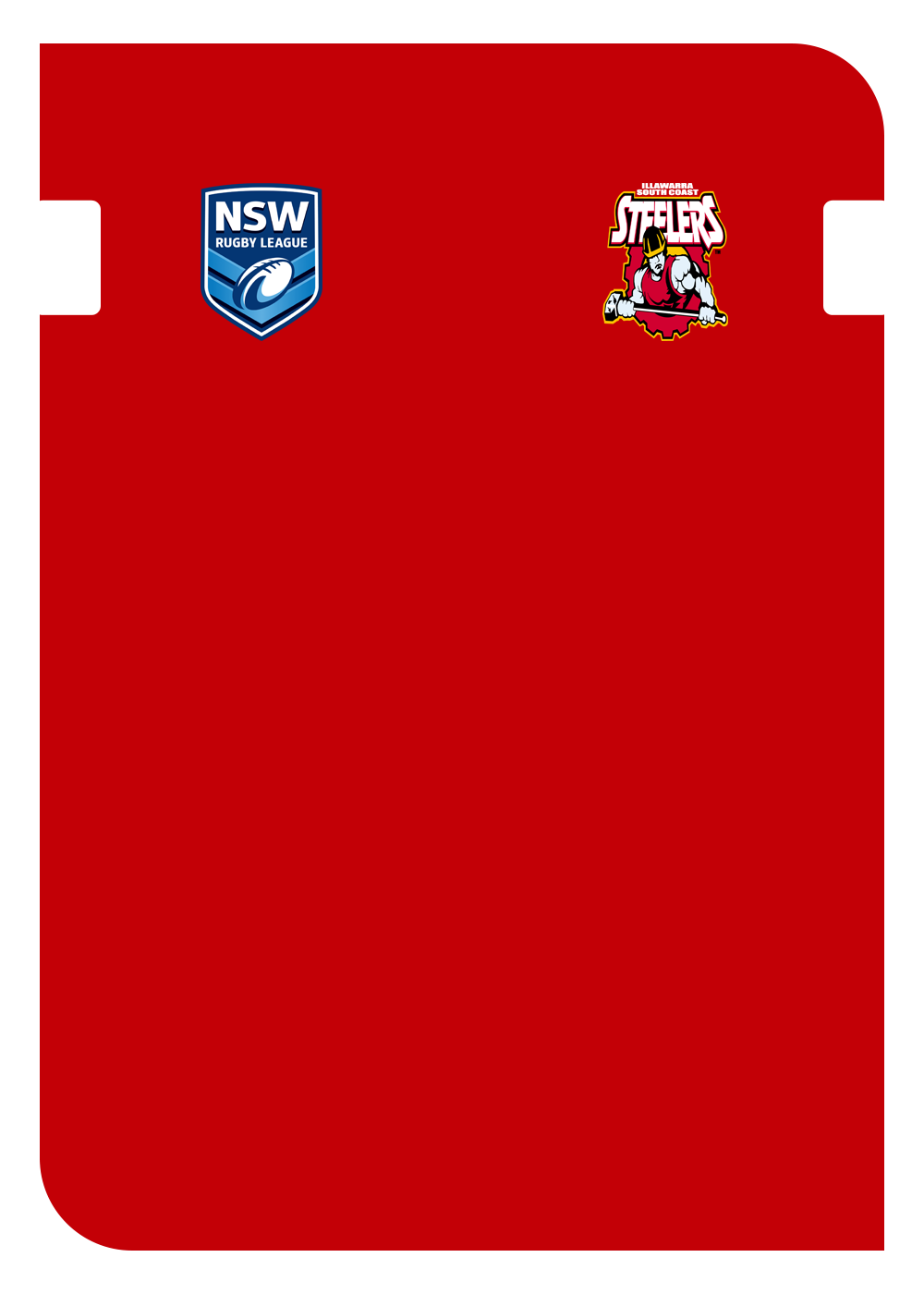
Illawarra-South Coast; Steelers Ground: Collegians Sports Stadium City/Suburb: Wollongong (Figtree) Head coach: TBA

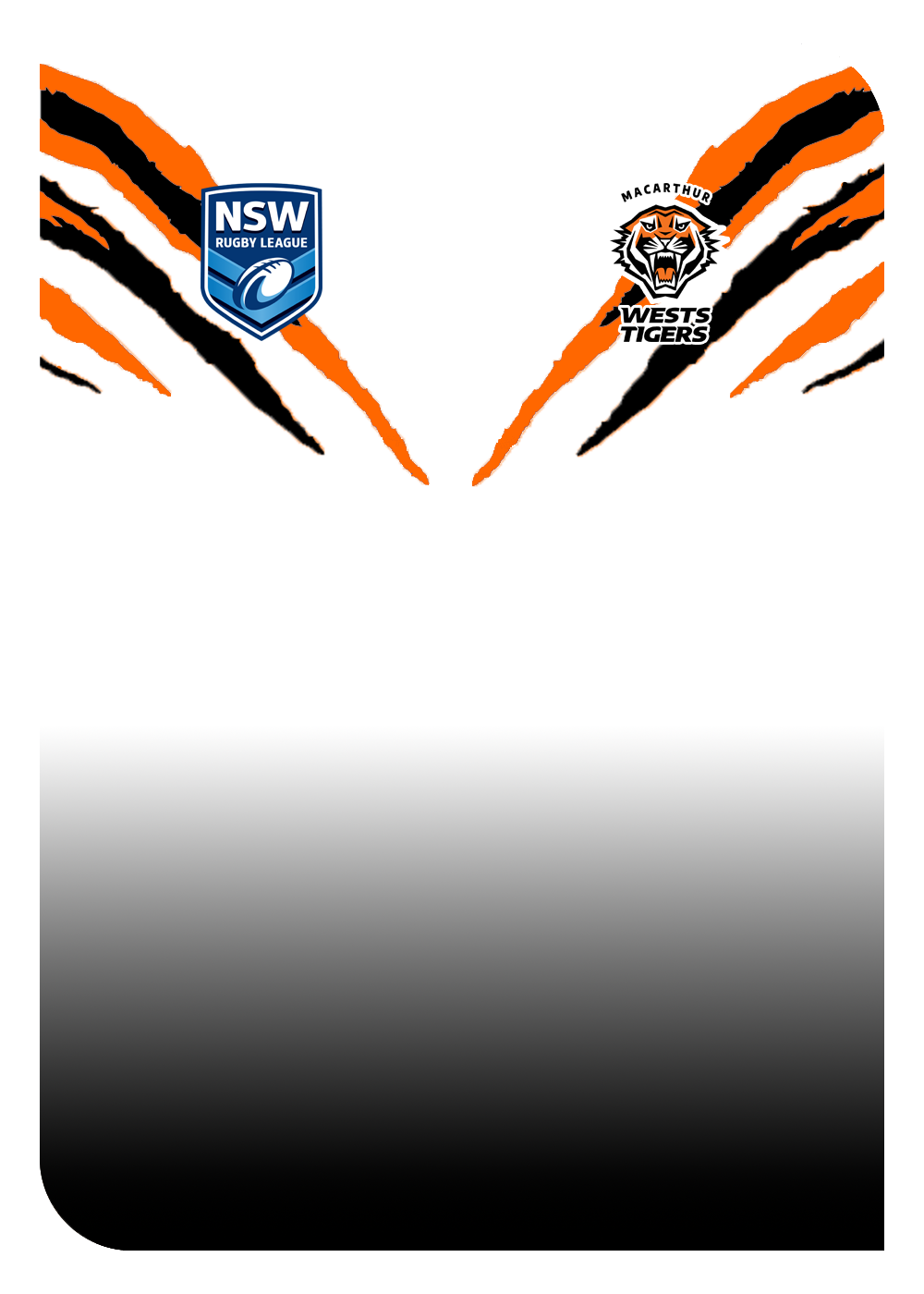
Macarthur-Wests; Tigers Ground: Kirkham Oval City/Suburb: Sydney (Elderslie) Head coach: TBA

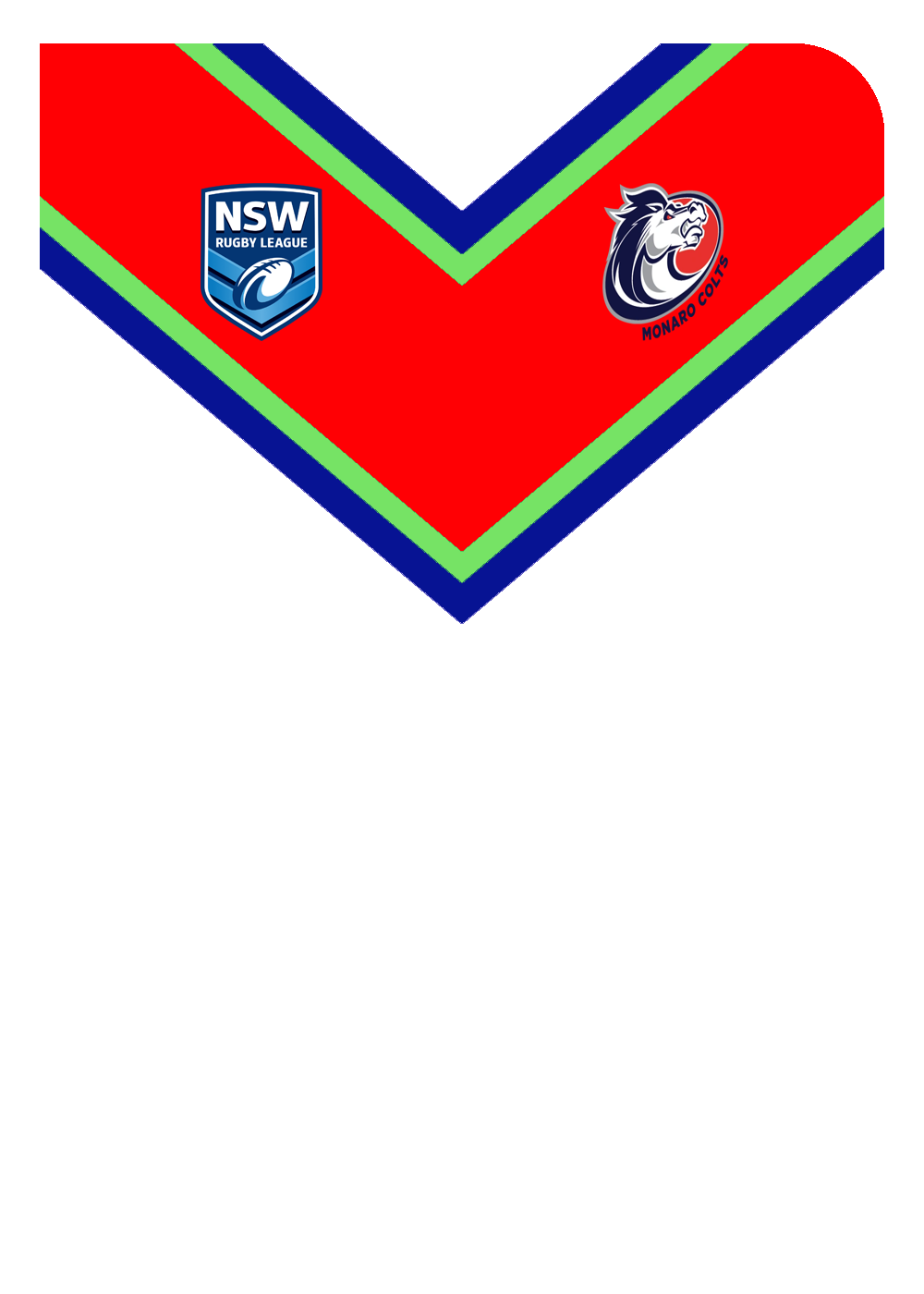
Monaro; Colts Ground: Seiffert Oval City/Suburb: Queanbeyan (Queanbeyan East) Head coach: TBA

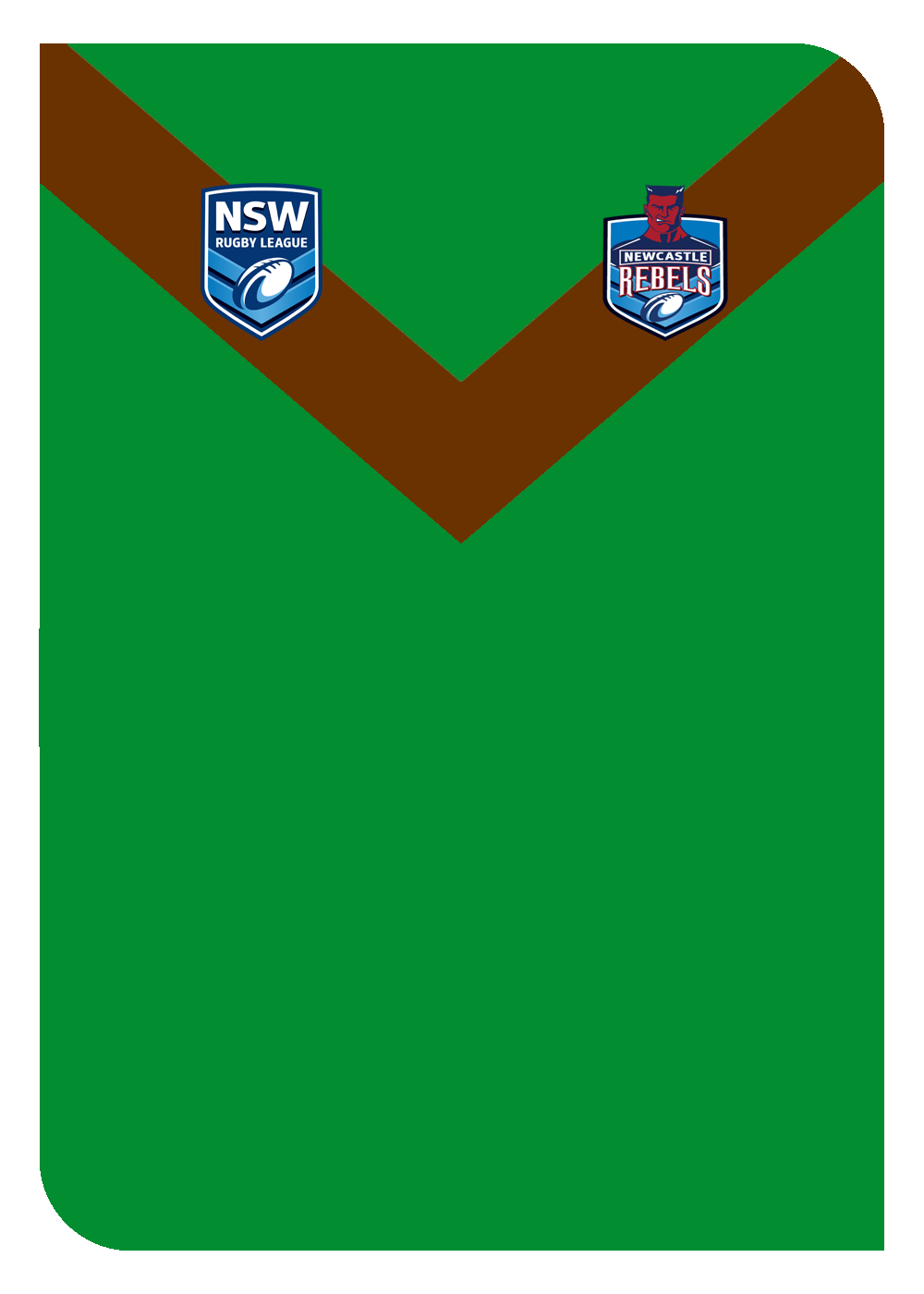
Newcastle; Rebels Ground: Lakeside Sporting Complex City/Suburb: Raymond Terrace Head coach: TBA

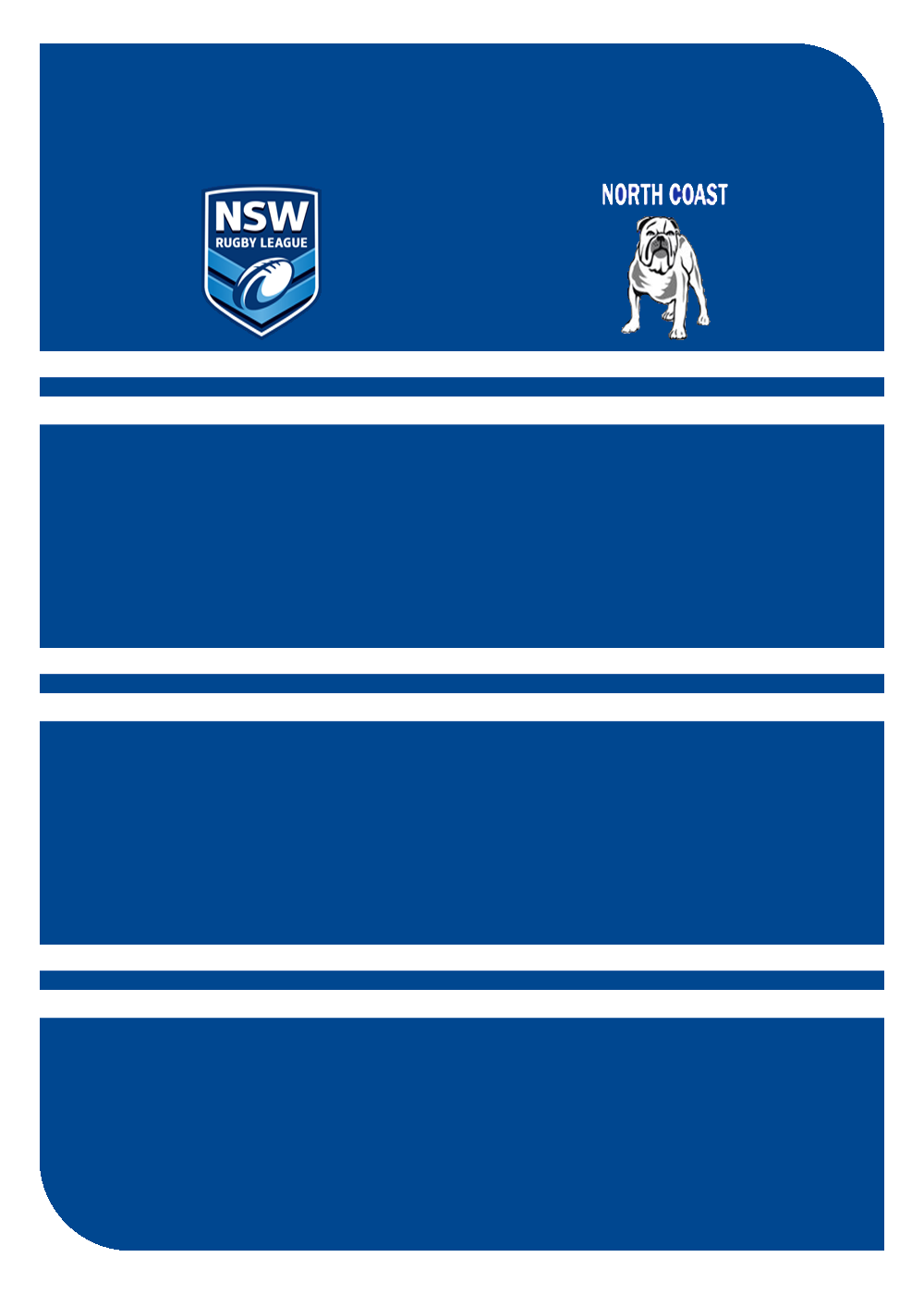
North Coast; Bulldogs Ground: Port Macquarie Regional Stadium City/Suburb: Port Macquarie Head coach: Jamie Soward

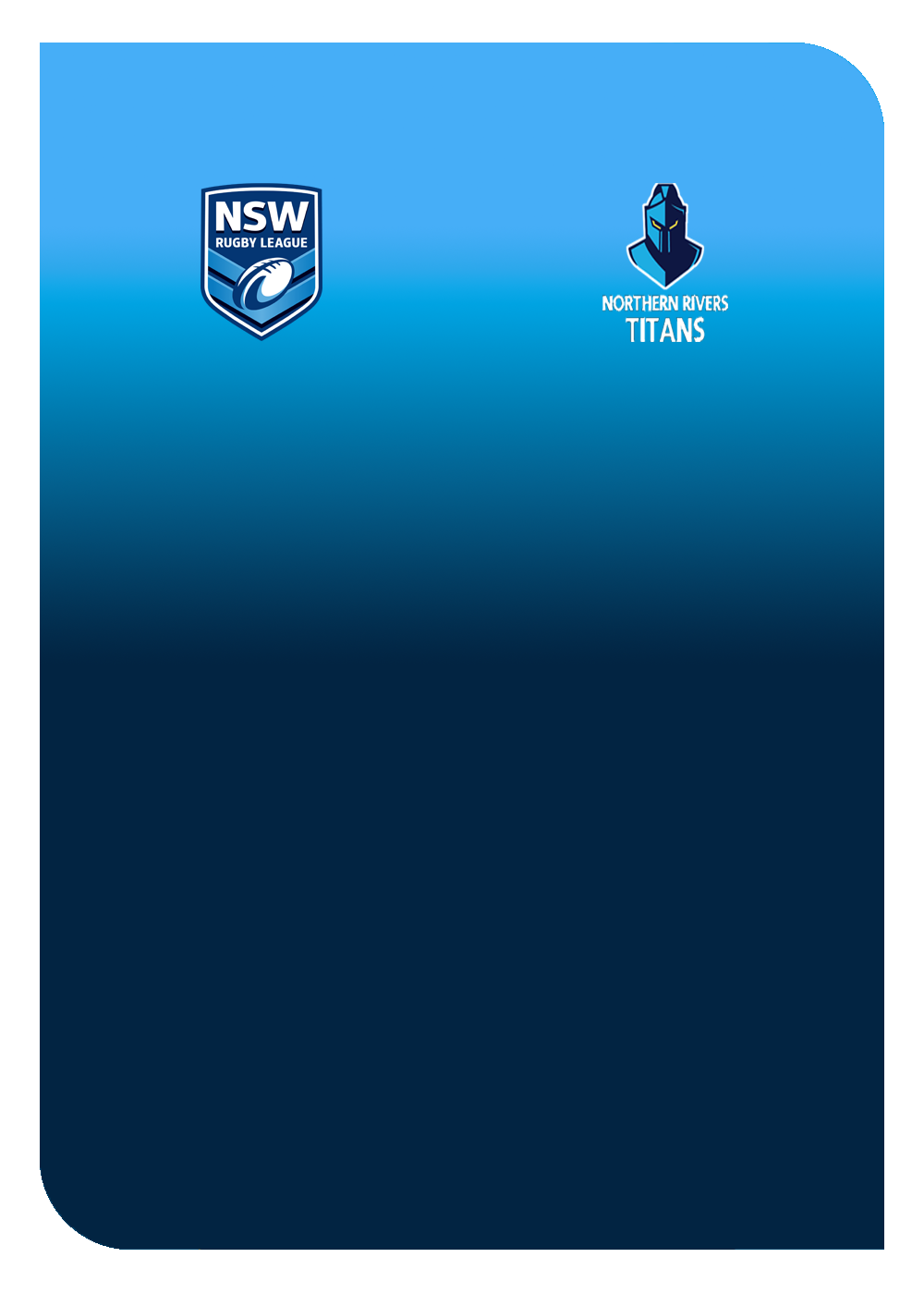
Northern Rivers; Titans Ground: Crozier Field City/Suburb: Lismore (Lismore) Head coach: TBA

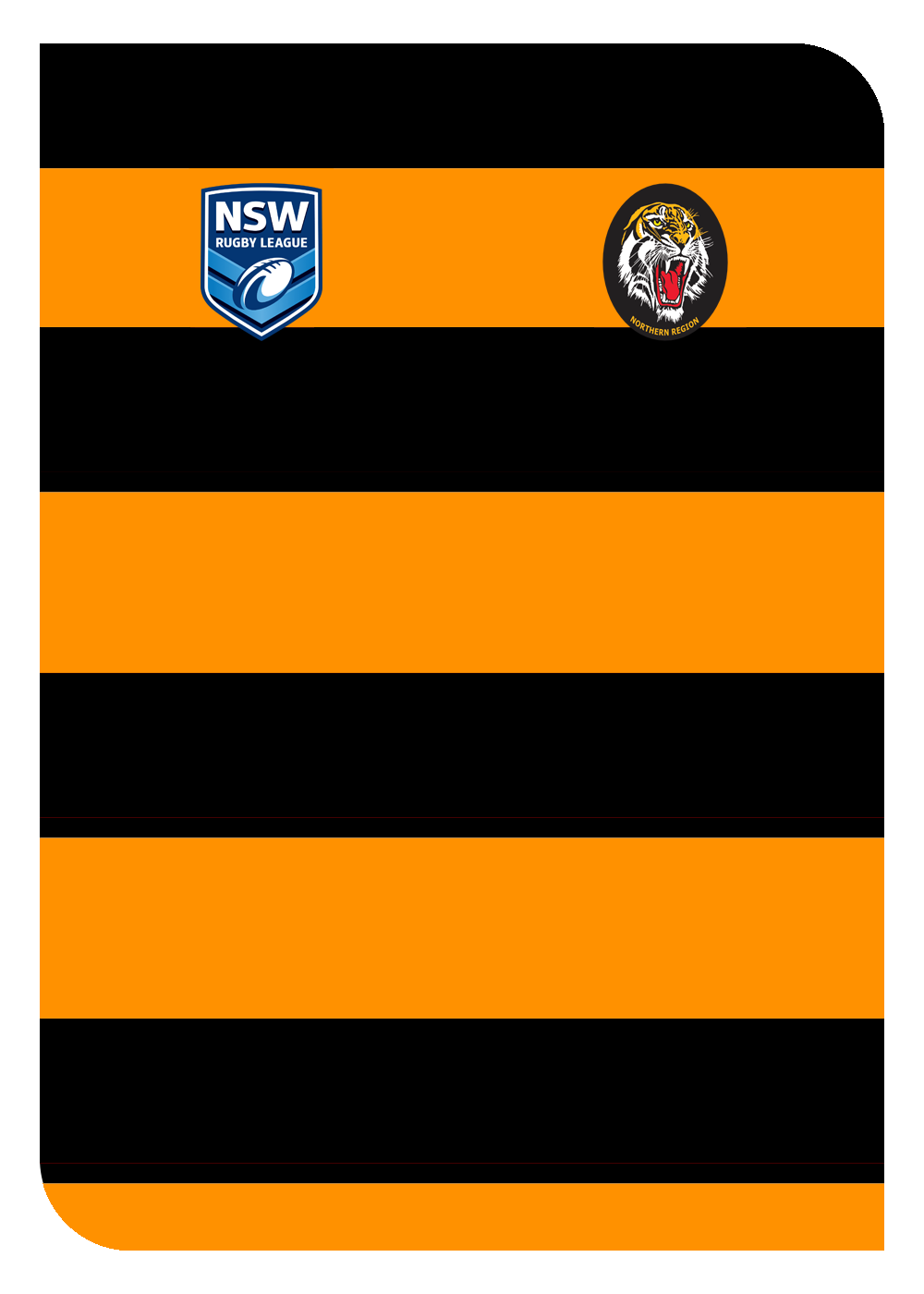
Northern; Tigers Ground: Scully Park City/Suburb: Tamworth (West Tamworth) Head coach: TBA

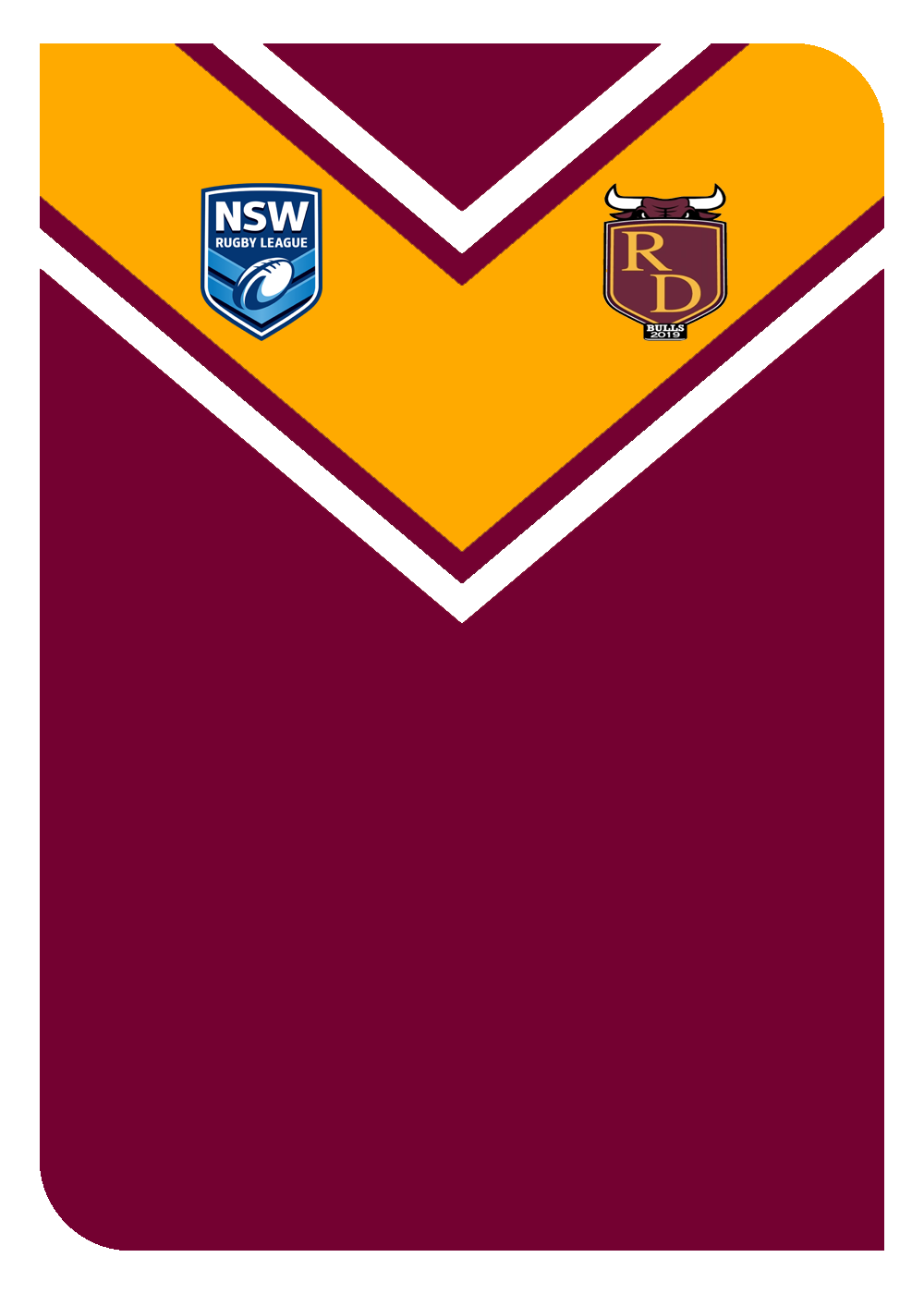
Riverina; Bulls Ground: GeoHex Park City/Suburb: Wagga Wagga (East Wagga Wagga) Head coach: TBA

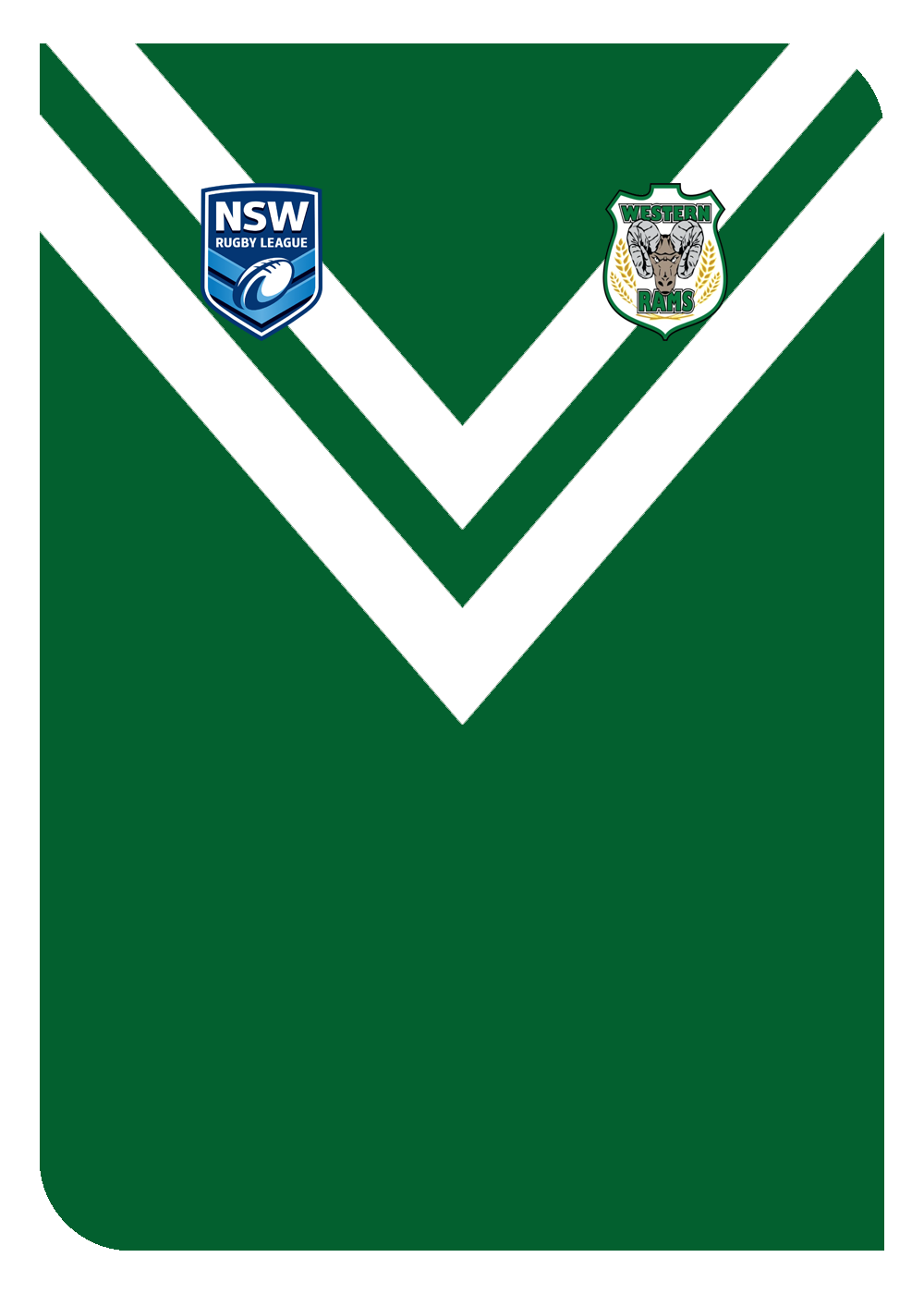
Western; Rams Ground: Carrington Park City/Suburb: Bathurst (Bathurst) Head coach: TBA

Season Results:

Home	Score	Away	Match Information
Home	Score	Away	Date and Time	Venue	Referee	Video
Round 1
Northern Tigers	6 – 62	North Coast Bulldogs	Saturday, 28 February, 3:20pm	Scully Park	Brayden Silvester
Riverina Bulls	18 – 30	Monaro Colts	Sunday, 1 March, 3:20pm	Laurie Daley Oval	Matthew Galvin
Round 2
Northern Rivers Titans	42 – 14	North Coast Bulldogs	Saturday, 7 March, 2:00pm	Crozier Field	Jayden Kastelan
Monaro Colts	16 – 48	Newcastle Rebels	Saturday, 7 March, 2:50pm	Seiffert Oval	Aidan Richardson
Illawarra-South Coast Steelers	30 – 31	Macarthur-Wests Tigers	Saturday, 14 March, 11:00am	Centenary Field	Balunn Simon
Western Rams	12 – 28	Central Coast Roosters	Saturday, 14 March, 5:00pm	Carrington Park	Stuart Halsey
Finals Series
Semi-Finals
Central Coast Roosters	34 – 10	Macarthur-Wests Tigers	Saturday, 21 March, 11:30am	Woy Woy Oval	Callum Richardson
Northern Rivers Titans	24 – 34	Newcastle Rebels	Sunday, 22 March, 1:30pm	Crozier Field	Callum Rigby
Grand Final
Central Coast Roosters	4 – 36	Newcastle Rebels	Saturday, 28 March, 3:00pm	Port Macquarie Regional Stadium	Callum Richardson

==== Grand Final ====
2026 Men's Country Championships Grand Final

Saturday, 28 March 2026
3:00pm

Central Coast Roosters	4 – 36	Newcastle Rebels

Port Macquarie Regional Stadium, Port Macquarie
Referee: Callum Richardson
Touch judges: Aleksandr Fitzgerald & Lachlan Gillies

=== Women's Country Championships ===
2026 Women's Country Championships
- Duration: 14 February – 28 March 2026
- Teams: 6
- Broadcast partners: Streaming; BarTV Sports (All Matches)

The Women's Country Championships mirrors the men's competition as the top open-age representative tournament for female players from regional New South Wales. It provides a pathway into the Harvey Norman Women's Premiership and, ultimately, the NRLW by giving regional players the opportunity to compete in a higher-intensity representative environment.

==== Teams ====
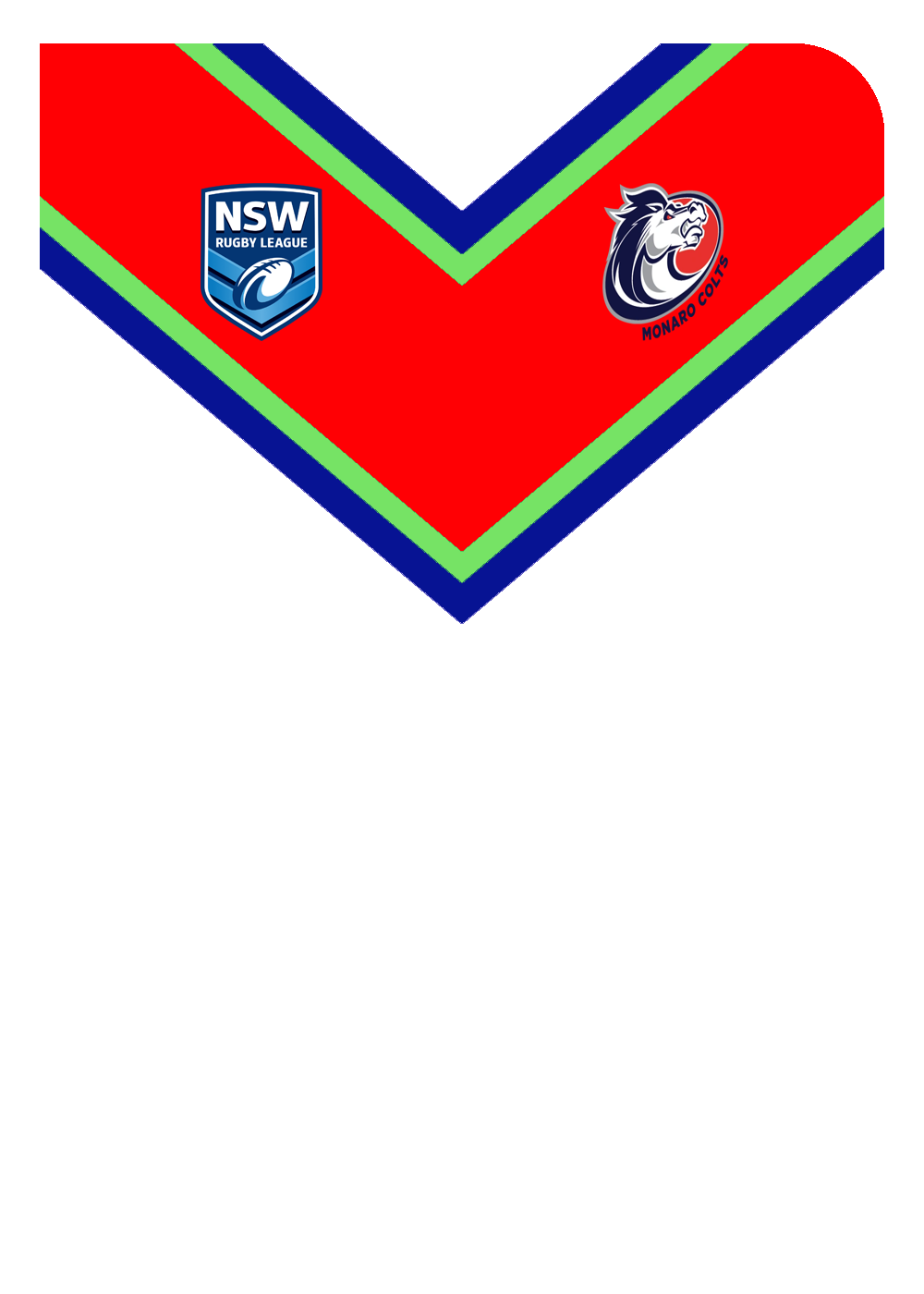
Monaro; Colts Ground: Seiffert Oval City/Suburb: Queanbeyan (Queanbeyan East) Head coach: TBA

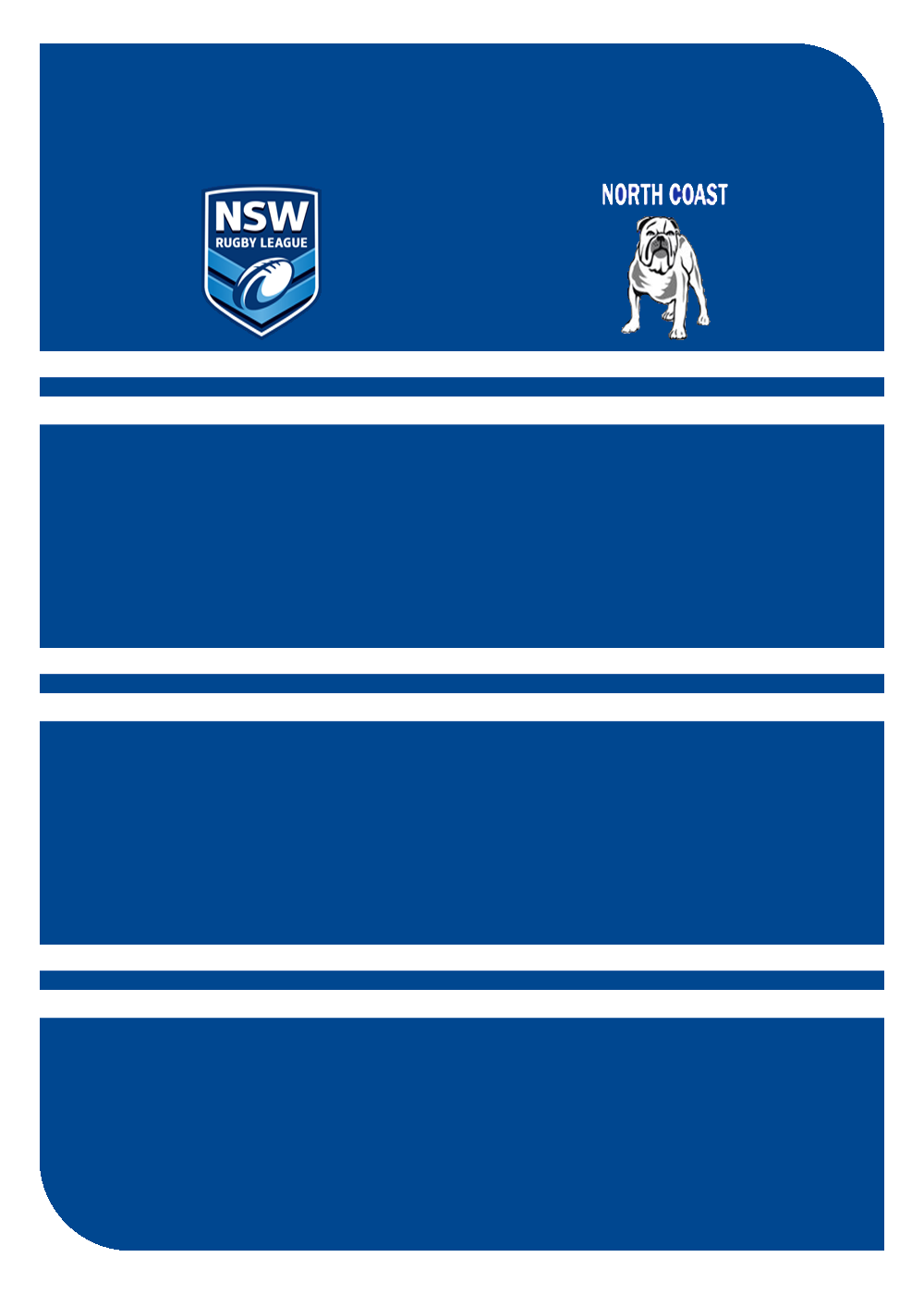
North Coast; Bulldogs Ground: Port Macquarie Regional Stadium City/Suburb: Port Macquarie Head coach: TBA

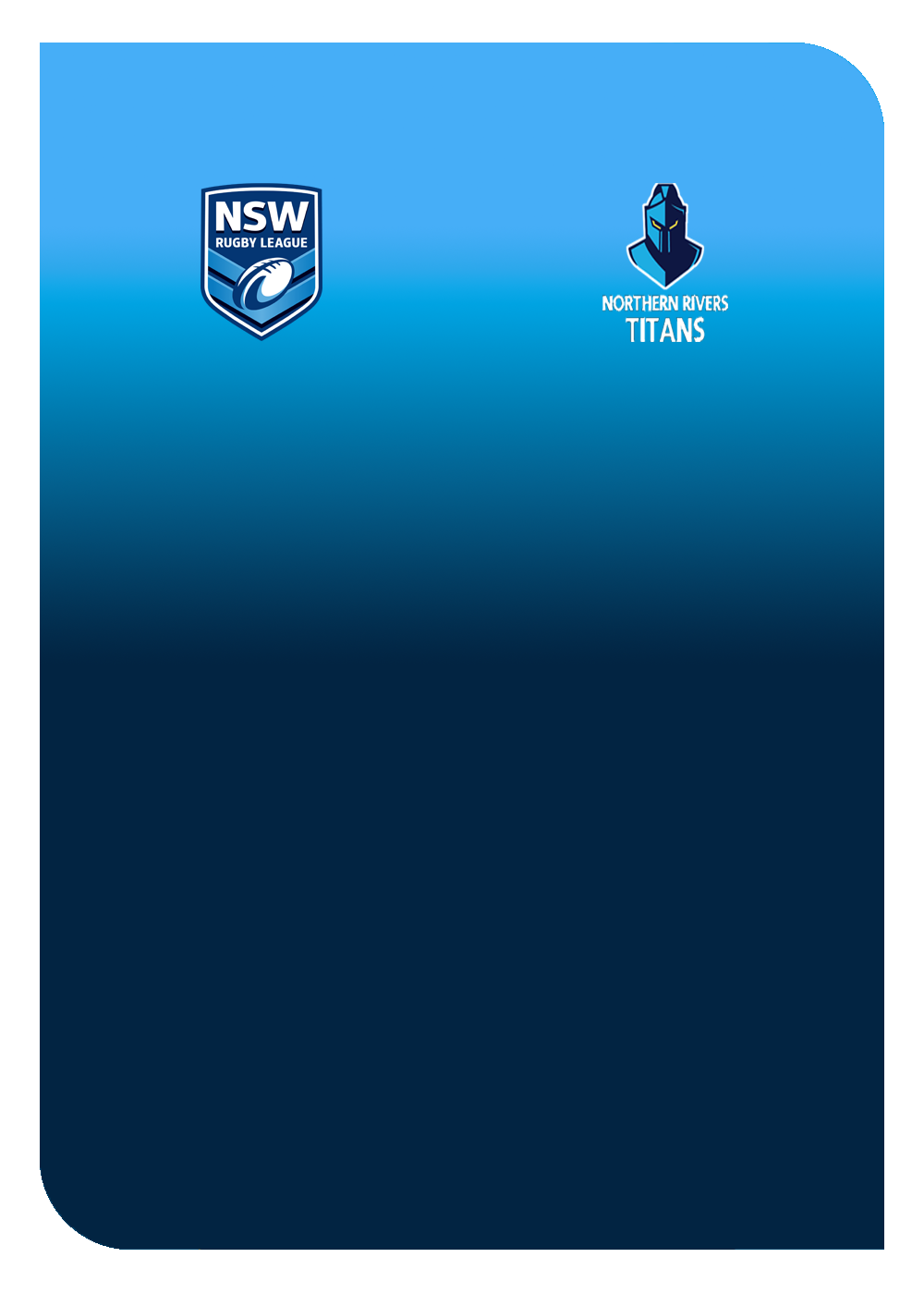
Northern Rivers; Titans Ground: Crozier Field City/Suburb: Lismore (Lismore) Head coach: TBA

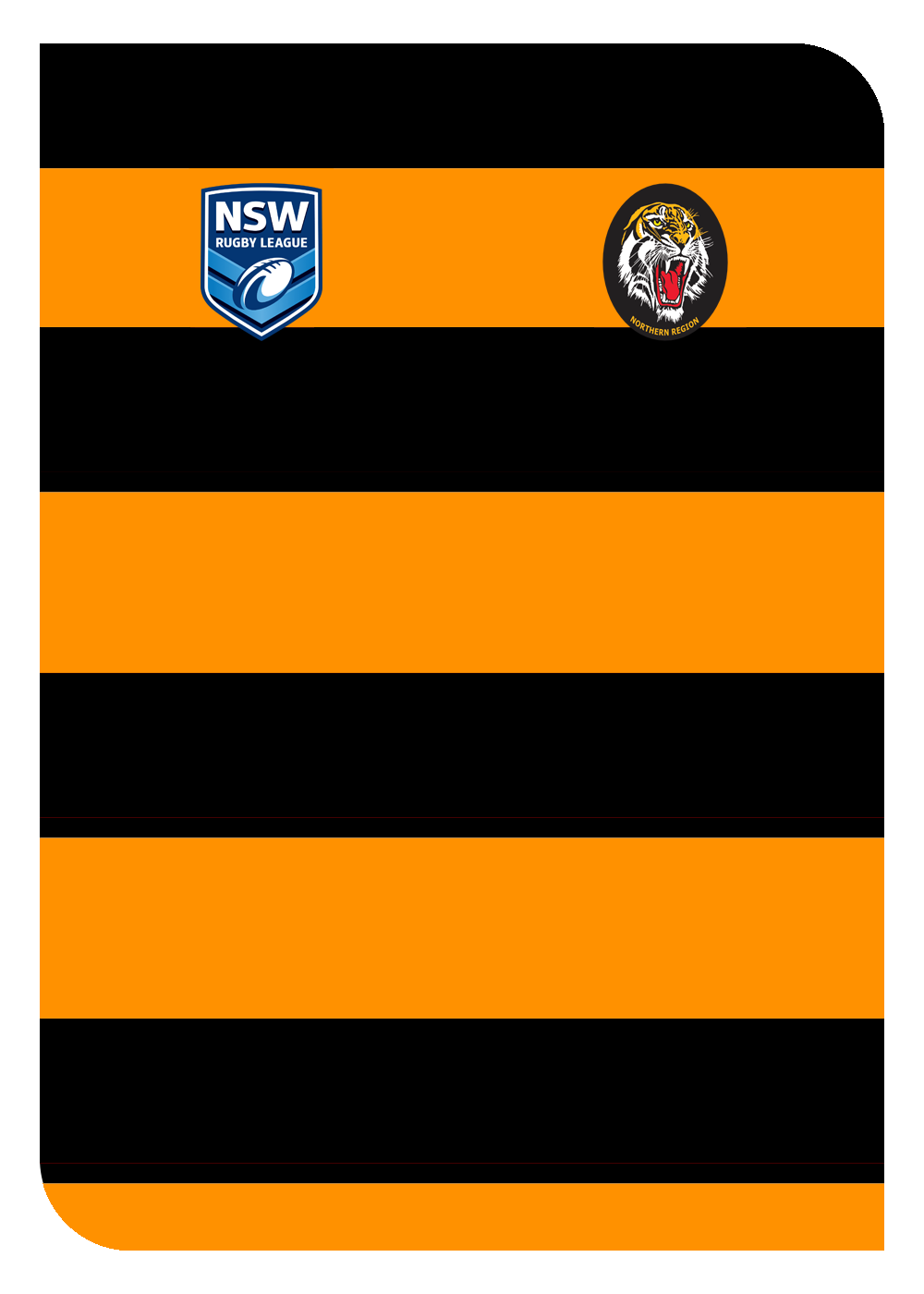
Northern; Tigers Ground: Scully Park City/Suburb: Tamworth (West Tamworth) Head coach: TBA

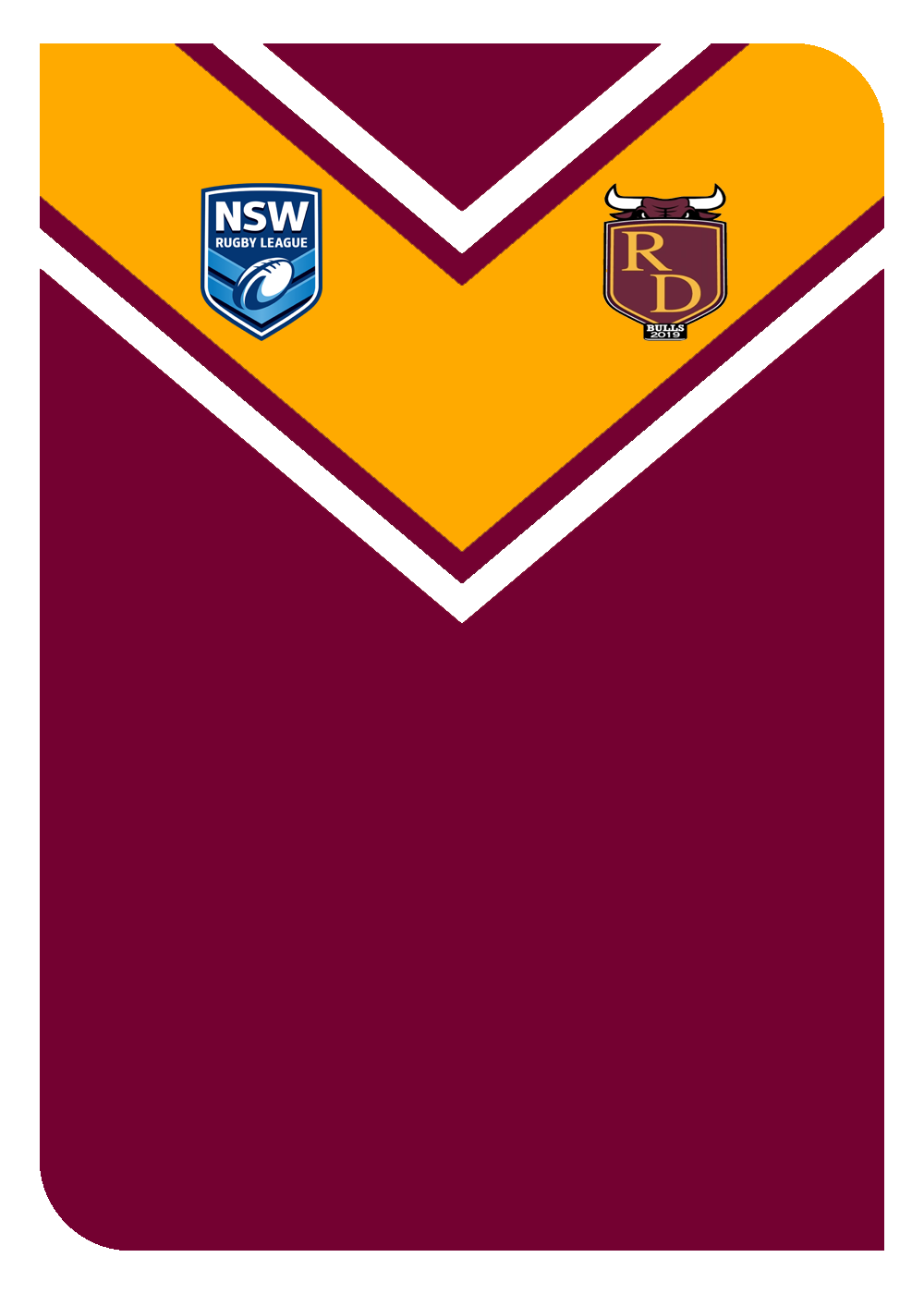
Riverina; Bulls Ground: GeoHex Park City/Suburb: Wagga Wagga (East Wagga Wagga) Head coach: TBA

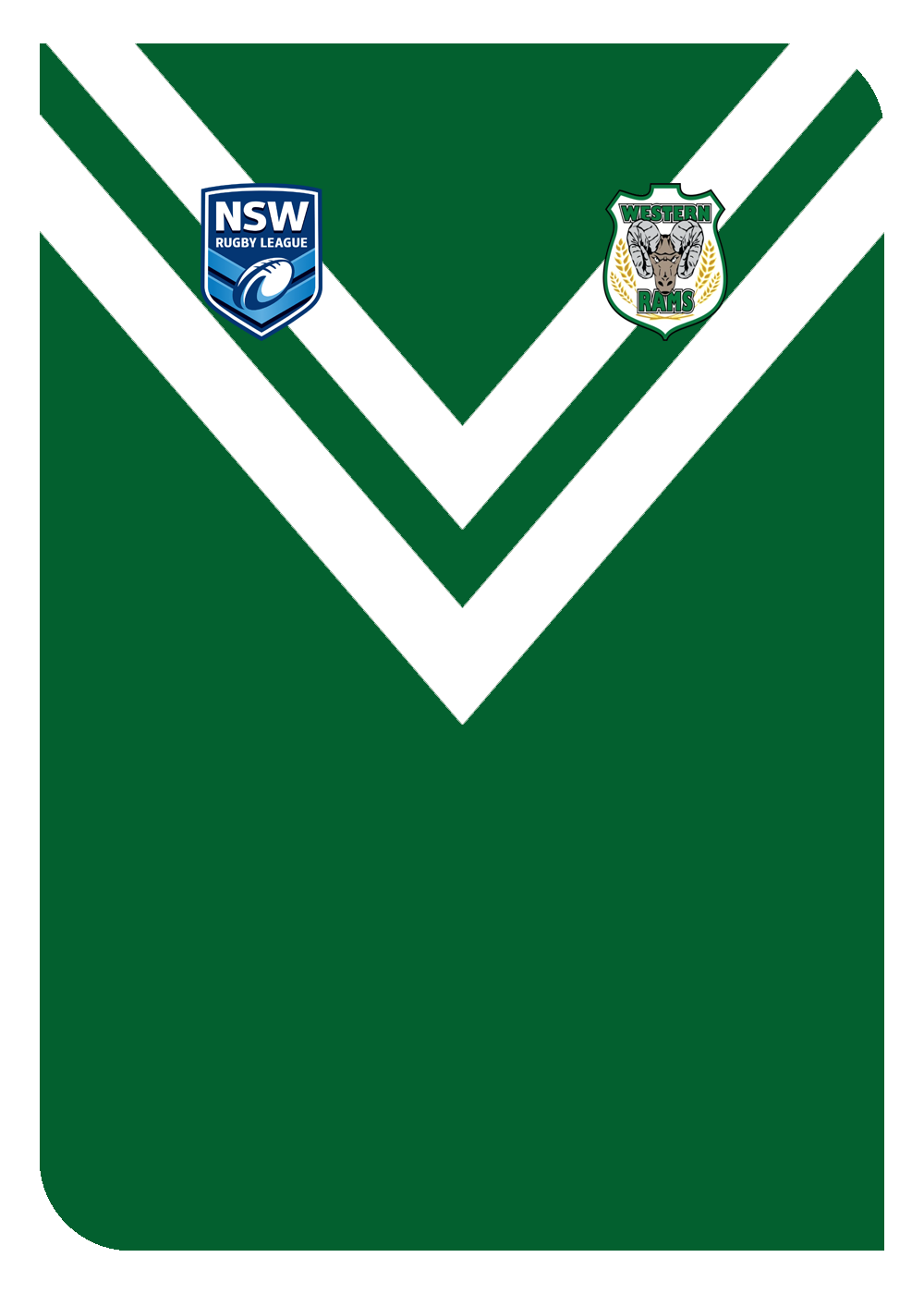
Western; Rams Ground: Carrington Park City/Suburb: Bathurst (Bathurst) Head coach: TBA

==== Ladder ====
Northern Conference

Pos	Team	Pld	W	D	L	B	PF	PA	PD	Pts	Qualification
1	North Coast Bulldogs (W)	2	2	0	0	1	44	22	+22	6	Semi-Finals
2	Northern Rivers Titans (W)	2	1	0	1	1	56	18	+38	4	Semi-Finals
3	Northern Tigers (W)	2	0	0	2	1	14	74	–60	2	

Updated to match(es) played on unknown. Source:
Rules for classification: 1) points; 2) point difference; 3) points scored

Southern Conference

Pos	Team	Pld	W	D	L	B	PF	PA	PD	Pts	Qualification
1	Monaro Colts (W)	2	2	0	0	1	70	34	+36	6	Semi-Finals
2	Western Rams (W)	2	1	0	1	1	84	34	+50	4	Semi-Finals
3	Riverina Bulls (W)	2	0	0	2	1	10	96	–86	2	

Updated to match(es) played on unknown. Source:
Rules for classification: 1) points; 2) point difference; 3) points scored

===== Ladder Progression =====
- Numbers highlighted in green indicate that the team finished the round inside the top 2.
- Numbers highlighted in red indicates the team finished last place on the ladder in that round.
- Underlined numbers indicate that the team had a bye during that round.

Pos	Team	1	2	3
Northern Conference
1	North Coast Bulldogs (W)	2	4	6
2	Northern Rivers Titans (W)	0	2	4
3	Northern Tigers (W)	2	2	2
Southern Conference
1	Monaro Colts (W)	2	4	6
2	Western Rams (W)	2	4	4
3	Riverina Bulls (W)	0	0	2

Season Results:

Home	Score	Away	Match Information
Home	Score	Away	Date and Time	Venue	Referee	Video
Round 1
Northern Rivers Titans (W)	12 – 14	North Coast Bulldogs (W)	Saturday, 14 February, 2:10pm	Crozier Field	Jacob Nelson
Western Rams (W)	56 – 4	Riverina Bulls (W)	Saturday, 21 February, 2:10pm	Jock Colley Field	Oscar Mayer
Northern Tigers (W)	BYE	Monaro Colts (W)
Round 2
Northern Tigers (W)	10 – 30	North Coast Bulldogs (W)	Saturday, 28 February, 10:45am	Scully Park	Ryley Hayes
Riverina Bulls (W)	6 – 40	Monaro Colts (W)	Sunday, 1 March, 10:50am	Laurie Daley Oval	Luke Heller
Northern Rivers Titans (W)	BYE	Western Rams (W)
Round 3
Northern Rivers Titans (W)	44 – 4	Northern Tigers (W)	Saturday, 7 March, 12:20pm	Crozier Field	Jacob Nelson
Monaro Colts (W)	30 – 28	Western Rams (W)	Saturday, 7 March, 1:40pm	Seiffert Oval	Josh Leigh
North Coast Bulldogs (W)	BYE	Riverina Bulls (W)
Finals Series
Semi-Finals
Monaro Colts (W)	4 – 14	Northern Rivers Titans (W)	Saturday, 21 March, 2:30pm	Dudley Chesham Sports Ground	Aleksandr Fitzgerald
North Coast Bulldogs (W)	14 – 20	Western Rams (W)	Sunday, 22 March, 9:00am	Crozier Field	Nicholas Willer
Grand Final
Northern Rivers Titans (W)	12 – 20	Western Rams (W)	Saturday, 28 March, 4:45pm	Port Macquarie Regional Stadium	Will Flint

==== Grand Final ====
Semi-Finals
1N	North Coast	14
2S	Western	20
1S	Monaro	4
2N	Northern Rivers	14

Grand Final
Northern Rivers	12
Western	20

2026 Women's Country Championships Grand Final

Saturday, 28 March 2026
4:45pm

Northern Rivers Titans (W)	12 – 20	Western Rams (W)

Port Macquarie Regional Stadium, Port Macquarie
Referee: Will Flint
Touch judges: Jacob Nelson & Lincoln Close
