= National Rugby League reserves affiliations =

The National Rugby League (NRL) is the top league of professional rugby league clubs in Australasia. Run by the Australian Rugby League Commission, however, there has not been a league-wide Reserve Grade competition since 1988, when the former New South Wales Rugby League expanded interstate to make the first attempt at a national competition, with the NRL Reserve Grade competition being shut down at the end of the 2002 season.

As a result, NRL-listed players who are not selected in their senior teams are made eligible to play in one of the second-tier state leagues: the New South Wales Cup or the Queensland Cup. The system used to accommodate NRL-listed players within these leagues varies considerably from state to state.

== Current affiliations ==
For the 2026 season, the 17 National Rugby League clubs will have the following reserves arrangements.

=== Current clubs ===
NRL club	Reserves arrangement	Affiliated club	Affiliated league	Affiliated location
Brisbane Broncos	Club affiliation (split)	Burleigh Bears	Queensland Cup	Miami (Gold Coast), Qld
Brisbane Broncos	Club affiliation (split)	Souths Logan Magpies	Queensland Cup	West End (Brisbane), Qld
Brisbane Broncos	Club affiliation (split)	Wynnum Manly Seagulls	Queensland Cup	Manly West (Brisbane), QLD
Brisbane Broncos	Club affiliation	Sunshine Coast Falcons (Note: The Broncos have a partnership with the Falcons but do not send players to the club.)	Queensland Cup	Kawana Waters (Sunshine Coast), Qld
Canterbury-Bankstown Bulldogs	Stand-alone reserves team	Canterbury-Bankstown Bulldogs	New South Wales Cup	Belmore, NSW
Canberra Raiders	Stand-alone reserves team	Canberra Raiders	New South Wales Cup	Canberra, ACT
Cronulla-Sutherland Sharks	Club affiliation	Newtown Jets	New South Wales Cup	Marrickville (Sydney), NSW
Dolphins	Club affiliation (split)	Central Queensland Capras	Queensland Cup	Rockhampton, Qld
Dolphins	Club affiliation (split)	Norths Devils	Queensland Cup	Nundah (Brisbane), Qld
Dolphins	Club affiliation (split)	Redcliffe Dolphins	Queensland Cup	Moreton Bay, Qld
Gold Coast Titans	Club affiliation (split)	Ipswich Jets	Queensland Cup	Ipswich, Qld
Gold Coast Titans	Club affiliation (split)	Tweed Heads Seagulls	Queensland Cup	Tweed Heads, NSW
Manly-Warringah Sea Eagles	Stand-alone reserves team	Manly-Warringah Sea Eagles	New South Wales Cup	Brookvale (Sydney), NSW
Melbourne Storm	Stand-alone reserves team	Melbourne Storm	New South Wales Cup	Melbourne, Victoria
Newcastle Knights	Stand-alone reserves team	Newcastle Knights	New South Wales Cup	Newcastle, NSW
New Zealand Warriors	Stand-alone reserves team	New Zealand Warriors	New South Wales Cup	Auckland, New Zealand
North Queensland Cowboys	Club affiliation (split)	Mackay Cutters	Queensland Cup	Mackay, Qld
North Queensland Cowboys	Club affiliation (split)	Northern Pride	Queensland Cup	Cairns, Qld
North Queensland Cowboys	Club affiliation (split)	Townsville Blackhawks	Queensland Cup	Townsville, Qld
Parramatta Eels	Stand-alone reserves team	Parramatta Eels	New South Wales Cup	Parramatta (Sydney), NSW
Penrith Panthers	Stand-alone reserves team	Penrith Panthers	New South Wales Cup	Penrith (Sydney), NSW
South Sydney Rabbitohs	Stand-alone reserves team	South Sydney Rabbitohs	New South Wales Cup	Redfern (Sydney), NSW
St George Illawarra Dragons	Stand-alone reserves team	St George Illawarra Dragons	New South Wales Cup	Wollongong, NSW & Carlton (Sydney), NSW
Sydney Roosters	Stand-alone reserves team	Sydney Roosters	New South Wales Cup	Sydney, NSW
Wests Tigers	Stand-alone reserves team	Western Suburbs Magpies	New South Wales Cup	Leumeah (Sydney), NSW & Leichhardt (Sydney), NSW

=== Future clubs ===
NRL club	Reserves arrangement	Affiliated club	Affiliated league	Affiliated location
Perth Bears	Club affiliation (split)	Brisbane Tigers	Queensland Cup	Coorparoo (Brisbane), Qld
Perth Bears	Club affiliation (split)	North Sydney Bears	New South Wales Cup	North Sydney, NSW
PNG Chiefs	Stand-alone reserves team	PNG Hunters	Queensland Cup	Port Moresby, PNG

- For the 2026 season, the Brisbane Tigers, PNG Hunters and Western Clydesdales in the Queensland Cup and the North Sydney Bears in the New South Wales Cup will be without an NRL affiliation.

== NRL club affiliation history ==
=== Australian Capital Territory club ===
Canberra Raiders

Upon their entry to the NSWRL premiership in 1982, the Raiders entered a team in the NSWRL's reserve grade competition. In the NRL-era the club has had the following arrangements:

- 1998–2007 — fielded stand-alone team in NSWRL organised competitions
- 2008–2011 — affiliation agreement with Souths Logan Magpies
- 2012–2020 — affiliation agreement with Mount Pritchard Mounties
- 2021–present — stand-alone reserve grade team in New South Wales Cup

In 2014 the Raiders had a club affiliation agreement with the Queensland Cup's Souths Logan Magpies, but did not supply any contracted players to play in the Queensland Cup competition.

=== New South Wales clubs ===
Canterbury-Bankstown Bulldogs

- 1998–2008 — fielded stand-alone team in NSWRL organised competitions
- 2009 — affiliation agreement with Bankstown City Bulls
- 2010–2020, 2023–present — stand-alone reserve grade team in New South Wales Cup
- 2021 — affiliation agreement with Mount Pritchard Mounties
- 2022 — split affiliation agreement with Mount Pritchard Mounties and stand-alone reserve grade team in NSW Cup

In 1999 the Bulldogs entered into an affiliation agreement with Queensland Cup team the Logan City Scorpions, after having an informal agreement during the 1998 season. The affiliation continued until the end of the 2002 season when the Scorpions merged with fellow Queensland Cup team Souths Magpies to form the Souths Logan Magpies.
From 2023–2025, the Bulldogs maintained a club affiliation agreement with the Queensland Cup's Western Clydesdales, but did not supply any contracted players to play in the Queensland Cup competition.

Cronulla-Sutherland Sharks

- 1998–2007 — fielded stand-alone team in NSWRL organised competitions
- 2008 — joint venture with Cobras Junior Rugby League Club, known as Cronulla-Sutherland Cobras
- 2009–2010 — stand-alone reserve grade team in New South Wales Cup
- 2011–2014 — joint venture with Melbourne Storm to field reserve grade players in NSW Cup under Cronulla-Sutherland Sharks name
- 2015–present — club affiliation with Newtown Jets

Manly Warringah Sea Eagles

- 1998–1999 and 2003–2008 — fielded stand-alone team in NSWRL organised competitions
- 2009–2010 — fielded reserve grade team in Queensland Cup, playing as the Sunshine Coast Sea Eagles
- 2011–2016, 2025–present — stand-alone reserve grade team in New South Wales Cup
- 2017–2024 — affiliation agreement with Blacktown Workers

During the 2000–2002 period when Manly operated the Northern Eagles joint venture in the NRL with the North Sydney Bears, both teams featured reserve grade teams in NSWRL competitions.

Newcastle Knights

- 1998–2007 — fielded stand-alone team in NSWRL organised competitions
- 2008 — affiliation agreement with Central Newcastle
- 2009 — None (Knights reserves played in local Newcastle rugby league competition)
- 2010–2011 — affiliation agreement with Central Coast Centurions
- 2012–present — stand-alone reserve grade team in New South Wales Cup

From 2020–2022 the Knights had a club affiliation agreement with the Queensland Cup's Ipswich Jets, but did not supply any contracted players to play in the Queensland Cup competition.

Parramatta Eels

- 1998–2007 — fielded stand-alone team in NSWRL organised competitions
- 2008–2019 — club affiliation with Wentworthville Magpies
- 2020–present — stand-alone reserve grade team in New South Wales Cup

Penrith Panthers

- 1998–2002 — fielded stand-alone team in NSWRL organised competitions
- 2003–2006 — joint venture St Mary's Cougars known as St Mary's-Penrith Cougars
- 2007, 2014–present — stand-alone reserve grade team in New South Wales Cup
- 2008–2013 — club affiliation with Windsor Wolves

South Sydney Rabbitohs

- 1998–1999, 2002–2006 — fielded stand-alone team in NSWRL organised competitions
- 2007–2018 — club affiliation with North Sydney Bears
- 2019–present — stand-alone reserve grade team in New South Wales Cup

During the 2000–2001 period when South Sydney were excluded from the NRL competition, the club maintained a team in NSWRL organised competitions.
In 2006, South Sydney had a club affiliation agreement with the Queensland Cup's Easts Tigers, but did not supply any contracted players to play in the Queensland Cup competition.
From 2024–2025, South Sydney maintained a club affiliation agreement with the Townsville Blackhawks, but did not supply any contracted players to play in the Queensland Cup competition.

St. George-Illawarra Dragons

Formed as a joint venture between the Illawarra Steelers and St. George Dragons, the St. George-Illawarra Dragons entered the NRL in the 1999 NRL season. Both teams had fielded stand-alone teams in the NSWRL organised competition in 1998.

- 1999 — fielded two reserve grade teams Illawarra Steelers and St. George Dragons in NSWRL organised competitions.
- 2000–2007 — fielded stand-alone team in NSWRL organised competitions
- 2008, 2011 — reserve grade players played in Illawarra District Rugby League competition
- 2009–2010 — joint venture with Shellharbour City Dragons
- 2012–2017 — club affiliation with Illawarra Cutters
- 2018–present — stand-alone reserve grade team in New South Wales Cup

Wests Tigers

Formed as a joint venture between the Balmain Tigers and Western Suburbs Magpies, the Wests Tigers entered the NRL in the 2000 NRL season. Both teams had previously fielded stand-alone teams in NSWRL organised competitions during the 1998 and 1999 seasons.

- 2000–2012 — fielded two reserve grade teams Balmain Tigers and Western Suburbs Magpies in NSWRL organised competitions. From 2005–2012, Balmain played as Balmain-Ryde-Eastwood Tigers.
- 2013–2018 — stand-alone reserve grade team in New South Wales Cup
- 2019–present — stand-alone reserve grade team in New South Wales Cup playing as Western Suburbs Magpies

=== New Zealand club ===
New Zealand Warriors

- 1999 — split club affiliation with Souths Magpies
- 1999 — split club affiliation with Wynnum Manly Seagulls
- 2000 — club affiliation with Souths Magpies
- 2001–2006 — reserve grade players played in local Auckland Rugby League competition
- 2007 — Entered NSWRL organised competition as Auckland Lions
- 2008–2013 — joint venture with Auckland Rugby League, playing in NSWRL organised competitions as the Auckland Vulcans
- 2014–2020, 2023–present — stand-alone reserve grade team in New South Wales Cup
- 2021–2022 — club affiliation with Redcliffe Dolphins

=== Queensland clubs ===
Brisbane Broncos

Upon their entry to the NSWRL premiership in 1988 the Broncos entered a team in the NSWRL's reserve grade competition. In the NRL-era the club has had the following arrangements:

- 1998 — club affiliation agreement with Brisbane Brothers
- 1999–2005 — club affiliation agreement with Toowoomba Clydesdales
- 2006–2020 — split club affiliation with Redcliffe Dolphins
- 2006 — split club affiliation with Toowoomba Clydesdales
- 2007 — split club affiliation with Aspley Broncos
- 2008, 2024–present — split club affiliation with Burleigh Bears
- 2008–2010 — split club affiliation with Easts Tigers
- 2008–2023 — split club affiliation with Norths Devils
- 2008–present — split club affiliation with Wynnum Manly Seagulls
- 2008–2015, 2020–2022 — split club affiliation with Central Queensland Capras (Note: Known as the Central Comets until 2012)
- 2013–2017 — split club affiliation with Ipswich Jets
- 2014–present — split club affiliation with Souths Logan Magpies

From 2026, Brisbane will maintain a club affiliation agreement with the Sunshine Coast Falcons, but will not supply any contracted players to play for the club.

Dolphins

- 2023–present — split club affiliation with Redcliffe Dolphins
- 2023–present — split club affiliation with Central Queensland Capras
- 2024–present — split club affiliation with Norths Devils

Gold Coast Titans

- 2007–2012, 2024–present — split club affiliation with Ipswich Jets
- 2007–present — split club affiliation with Tweed Heads Seagulls
- 2007, 2009–2023 — split club affiliation with Burleigh Bears

North Queensland Cowboys

- 1998 — club affiliation agreement with Townsville Stingers
- 1999 — split club affiliation with Cairns Cyclones and Wests Panthers
- 2000–2001 — fielded stand-alone team in NSWRL organised competition
- 2002–2007 — fielded reserve grade team in Queensland Cup known as North Queensland Young Guns
- 2008–present — split club affiliation with Mackay Cutters
- 2008–present — split club affiliation with Northern Pride
- 2015–2023, 2026–present — split club affiliation with Townsville Blackhawks

=== South Australian club ===
Adelaide Rams

In their only NRL season, the Rams had the following arrangement:

- 1998 – club affiliation agreement with Wests Panthers

=== Victorian club ===
Melbourne Storm

- 1998–2004 — club affiliation with Norths Devils
- 2005–2007 — split club affiliation with Norths Devils
- 2005–2006, 2024–2025 — split club affiliation with North Sydney Bears
- 2008–2009 — club affiliation with Central Coast Storm
- 2010 — fielded stand-alone team in NSWRL organised competition
- 2011–2014 — joint venture with Cronulla-Sutherland Sharks to field reserve grade players in NSW Cup under Cronulla-Sutherland Sharks name
- 2011–2025 — split club affiliation with Brisbane Tigers
- 2015–2025 — split club affiliation with Sunshine Coast Falcons
- 2026–present — stand-alone reserve grade team in New South Wales Cup

From 2026, Melbourne also entered into a pathways partnership with Mounties, for players from the club to play in the NSW Cup competition with Melbourne, and Victorian players to play in the Ron Massey Cup competition with Mounties.

== See also ==
- NSWRL Reserve Grade (1908 - 2002)
