= Ben Rogers (rugby league) =

Australian rugby league footballer

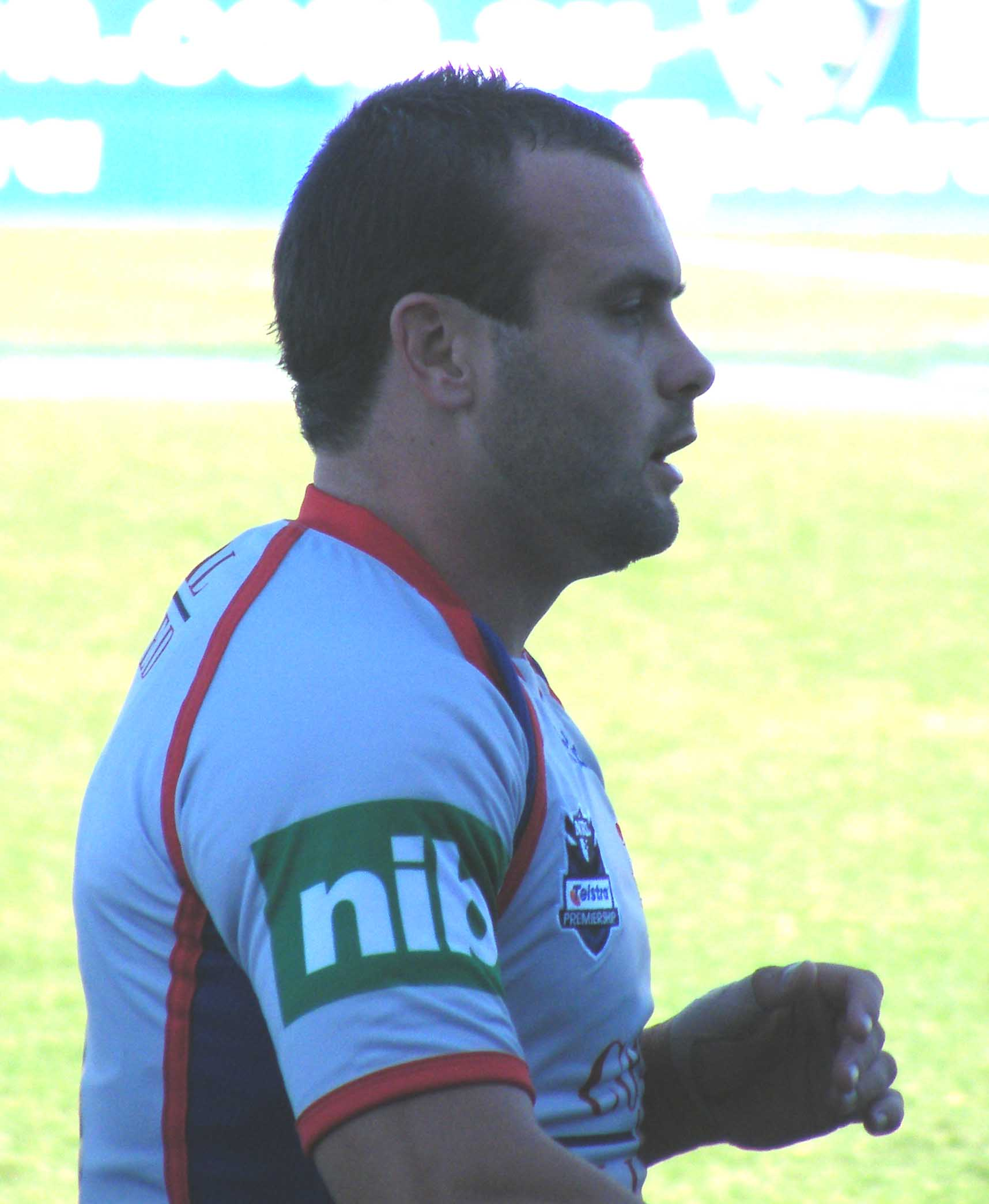

Personal information
- Full name: Ben Rogers
- Born: 26 April 1985 (age 40) Penrith, New South Wales, Australia

Playing information
- Height: 185 cm (6 ft 1 in)
- Weight: 92 kg (14 st 7 lb)
- Position: Five-eighth, Lock
Club
| Years | Team | Pld | T | G | FG | P |
|---|---|---|---|---|---|---|
| 2004–05 | Penrith Panthers | 11 | 2 | 0 | 0 | 8 |
| 2006–08 | South Sydney | 36 | 6 | 0 | 1 | 25 |
| 2008 | St. George Illawarra | 5 | 0 | 0 | 0 | 0 |
| 2009–11 | Newcastle Knights | 30 | 4 | 0 | 1 | 17 |
| | Total | 82 | 12 | 0 | 2 | 50 |

Ben Rogers (born 26 April 1985) is an Australian former professional rugby league footballer who played as a five-eighth and lock for the Newcastle Knights, St. George Illawarra Dragons, South Sydney Rabbitohs and the Penrith Panthers in the NRL.

== Playing career ==
Rogers made his first grade debut for the Penrith Panthers against St. George Illawarra in 2004.

In 2006, Rogers joined South Sydney and played 17 games in his first season at the club as they finished last on the table claiming the wooden spoon. In 2007, Rogers played in Souths first final campaign since 1989 but were eliminated in the first week by Manly-Warringah.

On 18 August 2008 it was announced that Rogers would join the Newcastle Knights on a two-year contract in 2009. He was suspended for 3 games in round 25 of the 2009 season for punching Daniel Vidot in a controversial ruling. Rogers dislocated his elbow in Round 1 of the 2011 New South Wales Cup while playing for the Central Coast Centurions.

In August 2011, Rogers was forced to retire from rugby league after he didn't recover well from a shoulder surgery.

== Later years ==
On 1 September 2013, Rogers was involved in an incident at Wests Leagues club of Lambton Newcastle after attending Down Town Ball, a charity function in support of Down Syndrome NSW for which Rogers was the Hunter Region ambassador, the incident involved two men and a female at a taxi rank where an alleged verbal stoush resulted in Rogers assaulting two men.

Rogers was charged on 8 October 2013 with two counts of assault occasioning actual bodily harm to which he pleaded not guilty claiming self-defence. On 16 April 2014 Rogers was found guilty and received a twelve-month good behaviour bond and a thousand dollar fine. He was subsequently stood down from club duties with the Newcastle Knights.
