= NSW Cup =

Australian rugby league competition

The Knock-On Effect NSW Cup
- Current season, competition or edition: 2026 NSWRL Major Competitions
- NSW Cup Logo as of 2021
- Formerly: Reserve Grade; Presidents Cup; NSWRL First Division; NSWRL Premier League; Intrust Super Premiership; Canterbury Cup; NSW Cup
- Sport: Rugby League
- Founded: 1908
- First season: 1908
- Owner: NSWRL
- Director: Nick Politis, Deborah Healey
- President: Dr George Peponis OAM
- No. of teams: 14
- Countries: Australia; New Zealand
- Most recent champion: New Zealand Warriors (2025)
- Most titles: South Sydney Rabbitohs (21 titles)
- Broadcasters: NSWRL TV; Fox League; Kayo Sports; 9Now (Grand Final only)
- Sponsor: The Knock-On Effect
- Level on pyramid: Level 2
- Related competitions: National Rugby League; NRL State Championship; Hostplus Cup
- Website: NSWRL

The NSW Cup, currently known as the Knock-On Effect NSW Cup for sponsorship reasons, is a rugby league competition for clubs in New South Wales. The competition has a history dating back to 1908, when it began as a reserve grade competition, and is now the premier open age competition in the state. The New South Wales Cup, along with the Queensland Cup, acts as a feeder competition to the National Rugby League premiership. The competition is the oldest continuous rugby league competition in Australia.

The NSW Cup is contested by reserve squads of NSW-based NRL teams and also includes sides representing teams that once competed at the first grade level in the NSWRL Premiership but no longer field teams in the NRL competition, and teams that have not fielded teams in the NRL competition. The North Sydney Bears are the only team to have competed in every season, since the start of the competition since 1908. The South Sydney Rabbitohs have the most titles in the competition, with 21 titles.

== Clubs ==
=== New South Wales Cup teams ===
The New South Wales Cup consists of 13 teams, 1 each from Auckland and Australian Capital Territory, and 11 from New South Wales. The league operates on a single group system, with no divisions or conferences and no relegation and promotion from other leagues. A number of clubs in the New South Wales Cup have an affiliation with a team in the Australian national competition, the National Rugby League, with most of the clubs in the being reserve grade teams to the senior grade teams of the NRL.

New South Wales Cup
Rugby League Club	Est.	Joined*	Location/s	Home Venue/s†	Titles (Last)	NRL Affiliate
Canberra Raiders	1982	2021	Canberra	Canberra Stadium; Raiders Belconnen	1 (2003)	Canberra Raiders
Canterbury-Bankstown Bulldogs	1935	2021	Sydney (Canterbury Bankstown region)	Belmore Oval; Stadium Australia	10 (2018)	Canterbury-Bankstown Bulldogs
Manly Warringah Sea Eagles	1947	1947, 2014, 2025	Sydney (Northern Beaches)	Brookvale Oval	5 (1988)	Manly Warringah Sea Eagles
Melbourne Storm	1998	2010, 2026	Melbourne	Melbourne Rectangular Stadium	0 (None)	Melbourne Storm
Newcastle Knights	1988	1988, 2012	Newcastle	Newcastle International Sports Centre	2 (2015)	Newcastle Knights
New Zealand Warriors	1995	2023	Auckland	Mt Smart Stadium	1 **(2025)**	New Zealand Warriors
Newtown Jets	1908	2014	Sydney (Marrickville region)	Henson Park	9 (2024)	Cronulla-Sutherland Sharks+
North Sydney Bears	1908	1908, 2003	Sydney (North Shore)	North Sydney Oval	8 (1993)	Perth Bears (From 2027)
Parramatta Eels	1947	1947, 2020	Sydney (Parramatta)	Ringrose Park; Western Sydney Stadium	8 (2007)	Parramatta Eels
Penrith Panthers	1966	1967, 2014	Sydney (Penrith/Blue Mountains)	Penrith Stadium	4 (2022)	Penrith Panthers
St. George Illawarra Dragons	1999	2000, 2018	Sydney (St George); Wollongong	Wollongong Showground; Jubilee Oval	1 (2001)	St. George Illawarra Dragons
South Sydney Rabbitohs	1908	1908, 2019	Sydney Redfern/Lower Eastern Suburbs	Redfern Oval; Stadium Australia	**21** (2023)	South Sydney Rabbitohs
Sydney Roosters	1908	1908, 2023	Sydney (Upper Eastern Suburbs	Sydney Football Stadium; Wentworth Park	9 (2004)	Sydney Roosters
Western Suburbs Magpies	1908	1908, 2018	Sydney (South Western Sydney) (Note: The team also plays in its traditional Ashfield/Lidcombe catchment area in Sydney's Inner West)	Campbelltown Stadium; Lidcombe Oval, Leichhardt Oval	3 (1981)	Wests Tigers

Bold indicates it is the club's highest level of competition.
*: The season the team joined competition in its current form and consecutive tenure.
+: Current affiliation between Cronulla and Newtown since 2015.

†:Does not include games played as NRL Curtain raisers

==== Uniforms ====
Home jerseys and uniforms of the NSW Cup

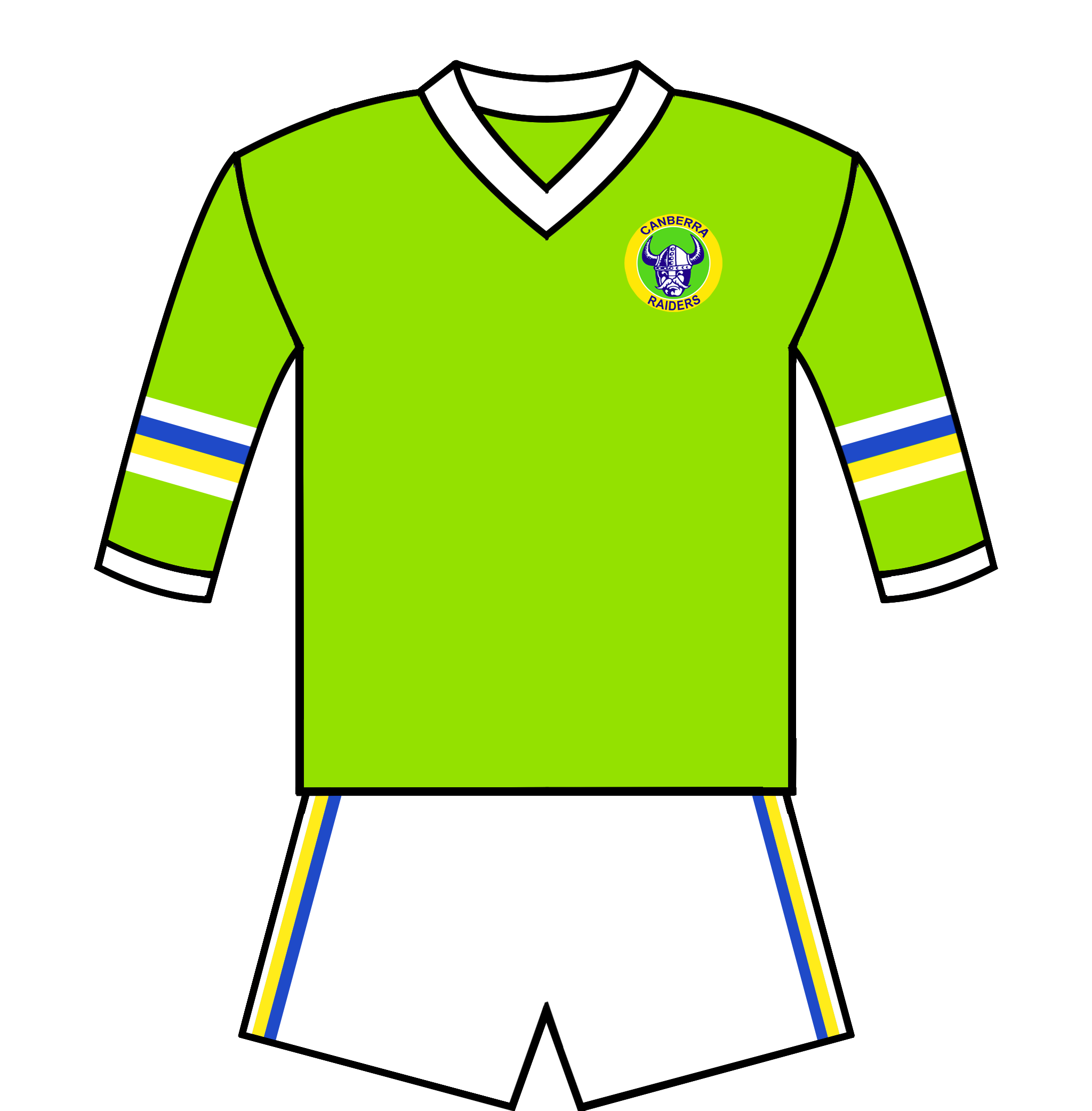
Canberra

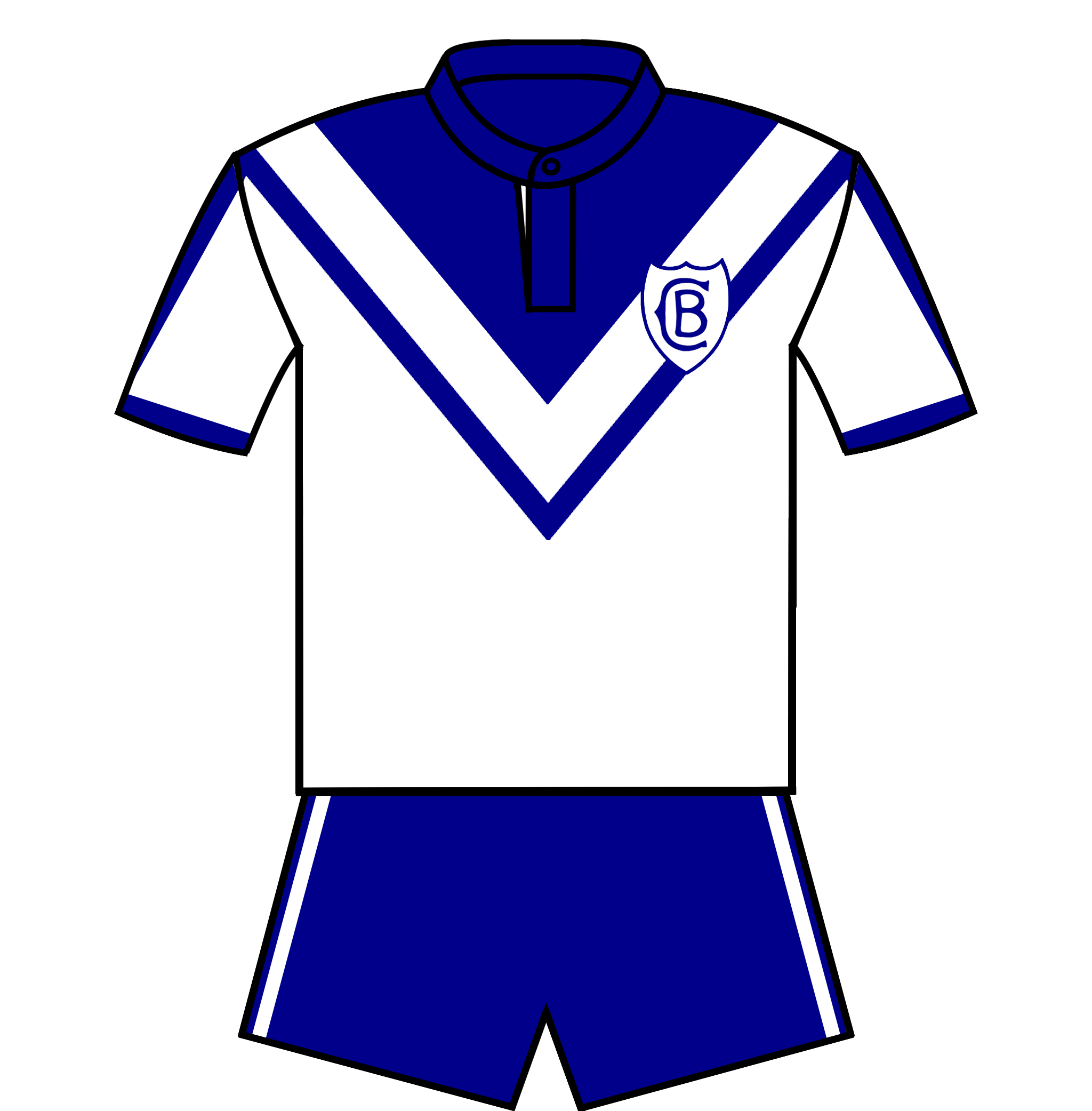
Canterbury-Bankstown

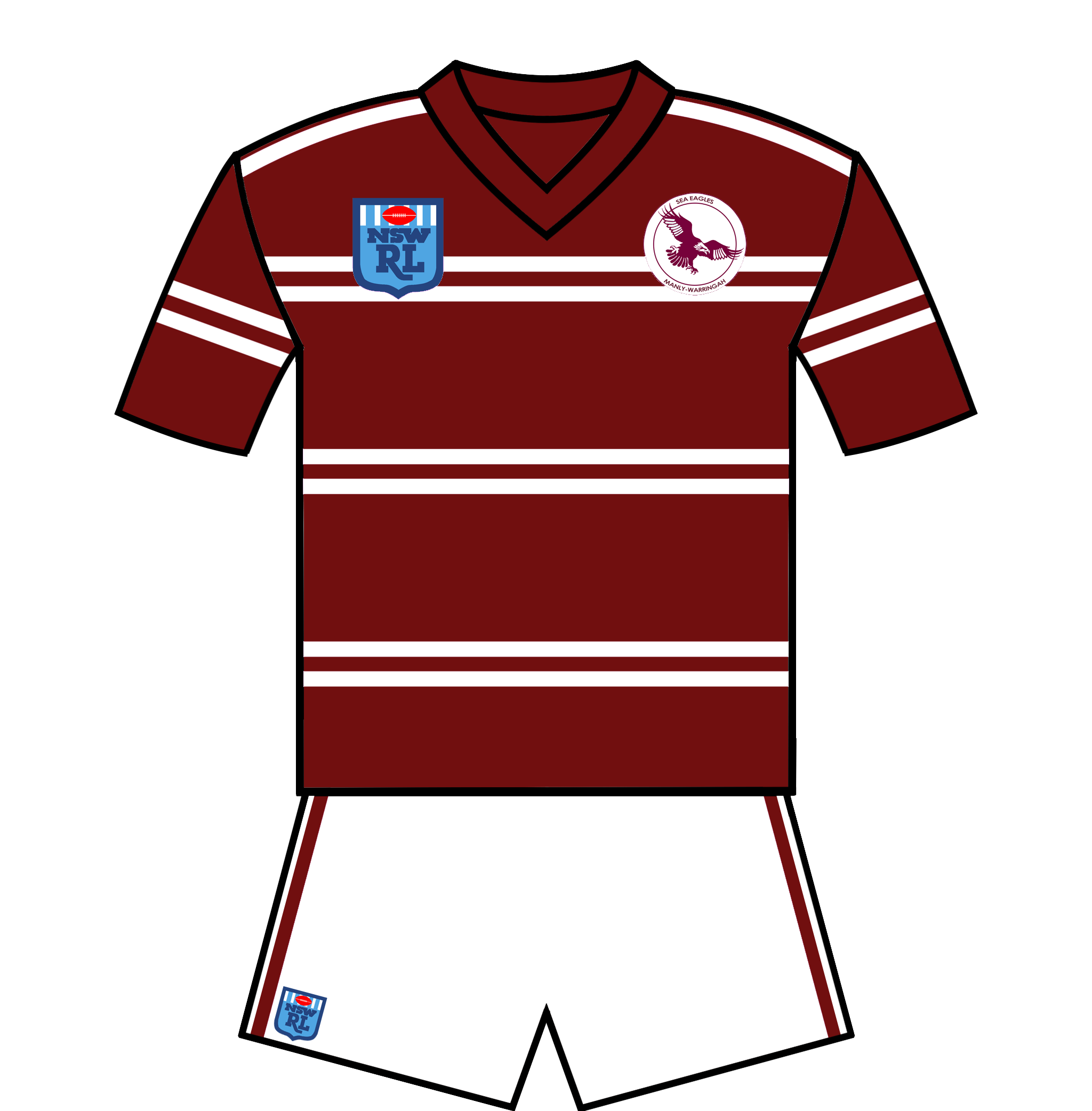
Manly-Warringah

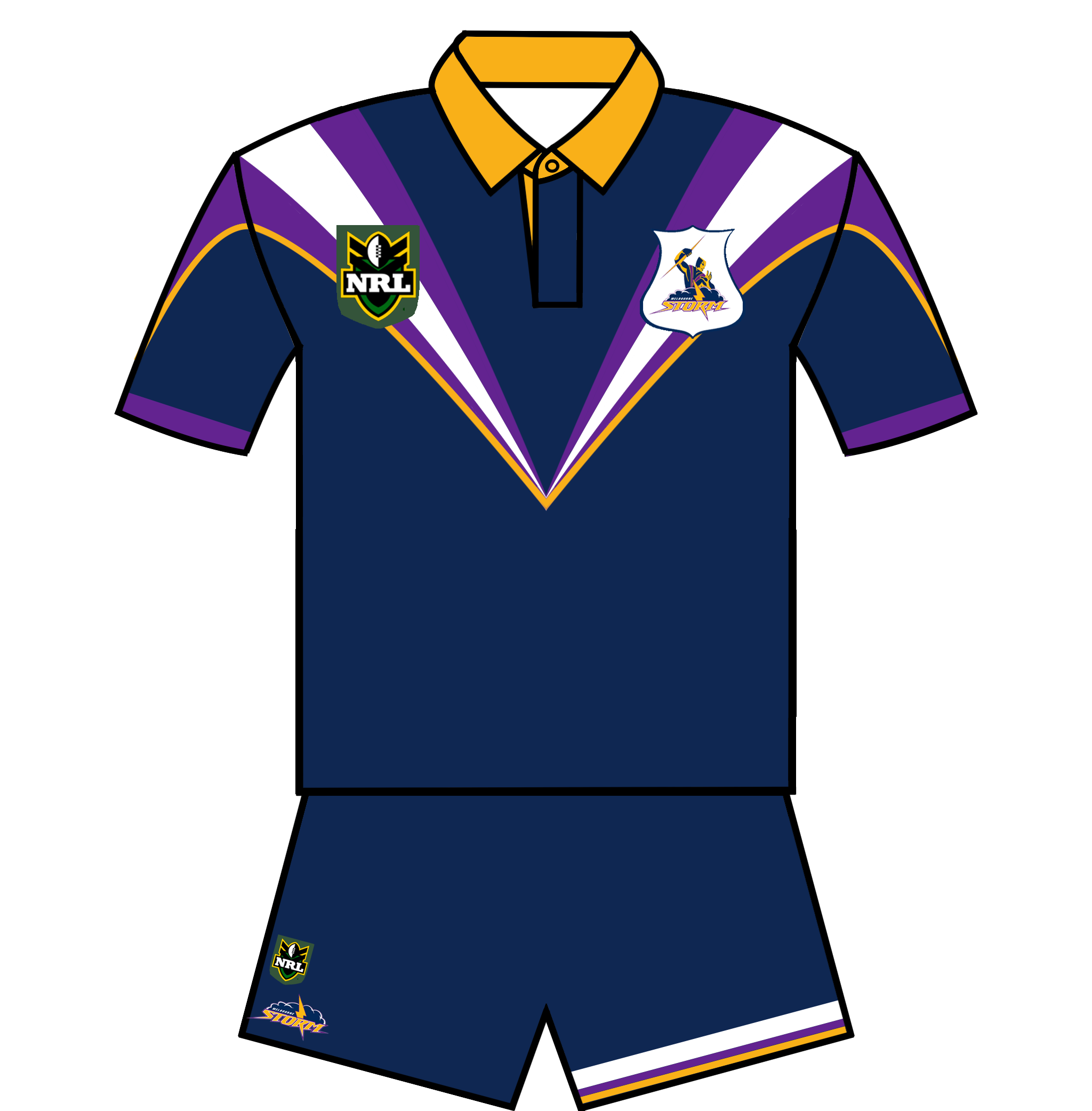
Melbourne

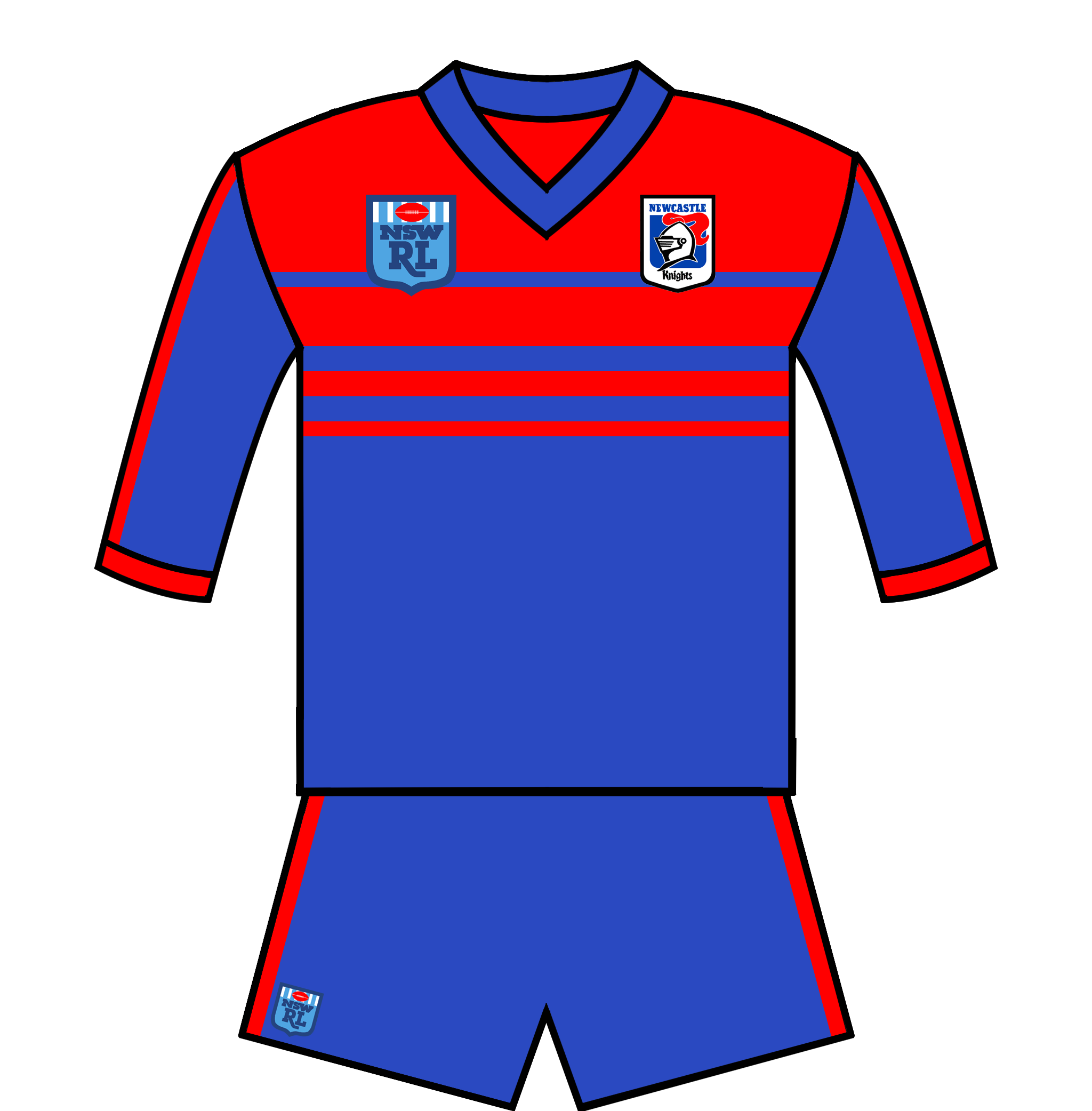
Newcastle

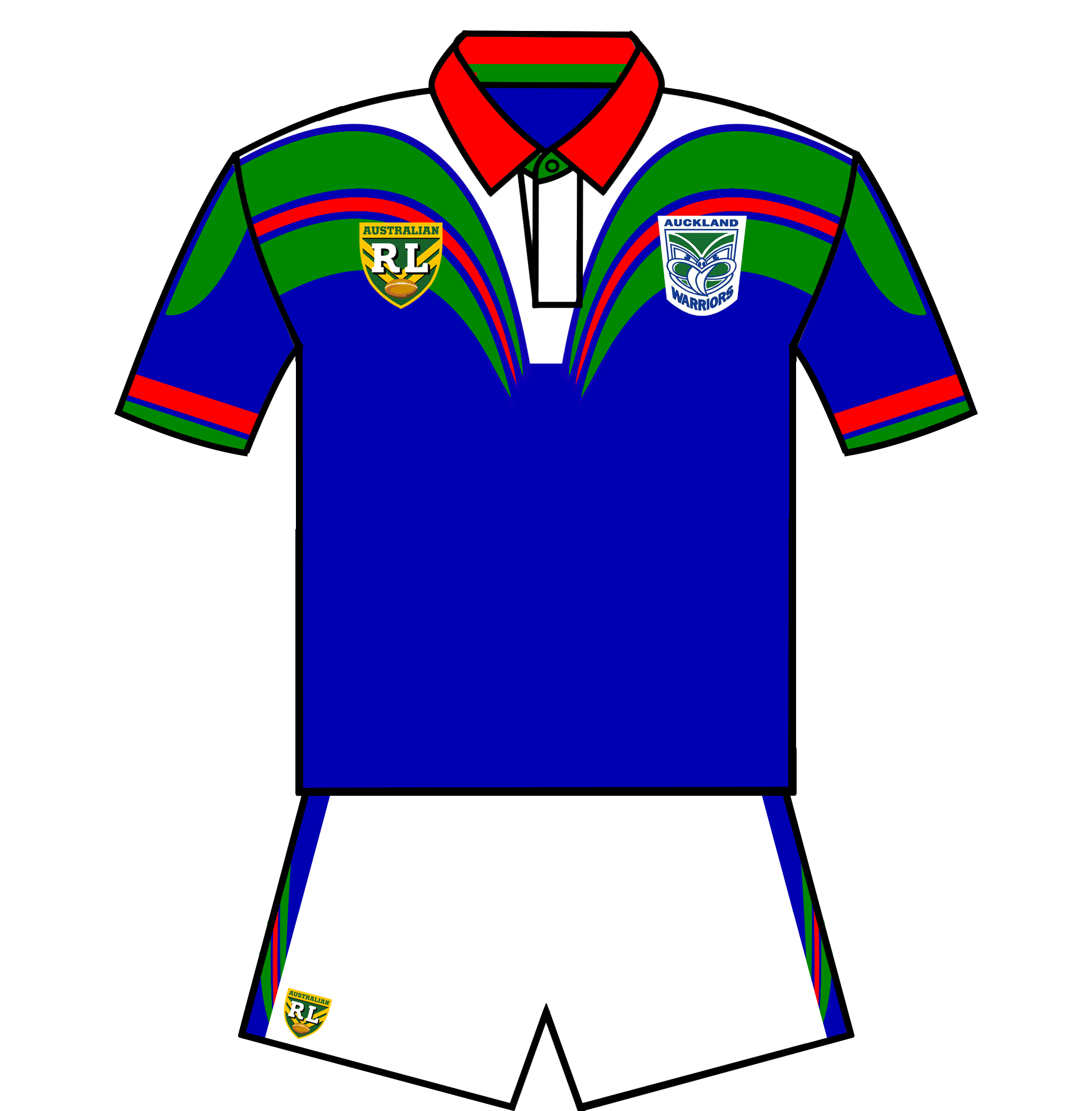
New Zealand (Auckland)

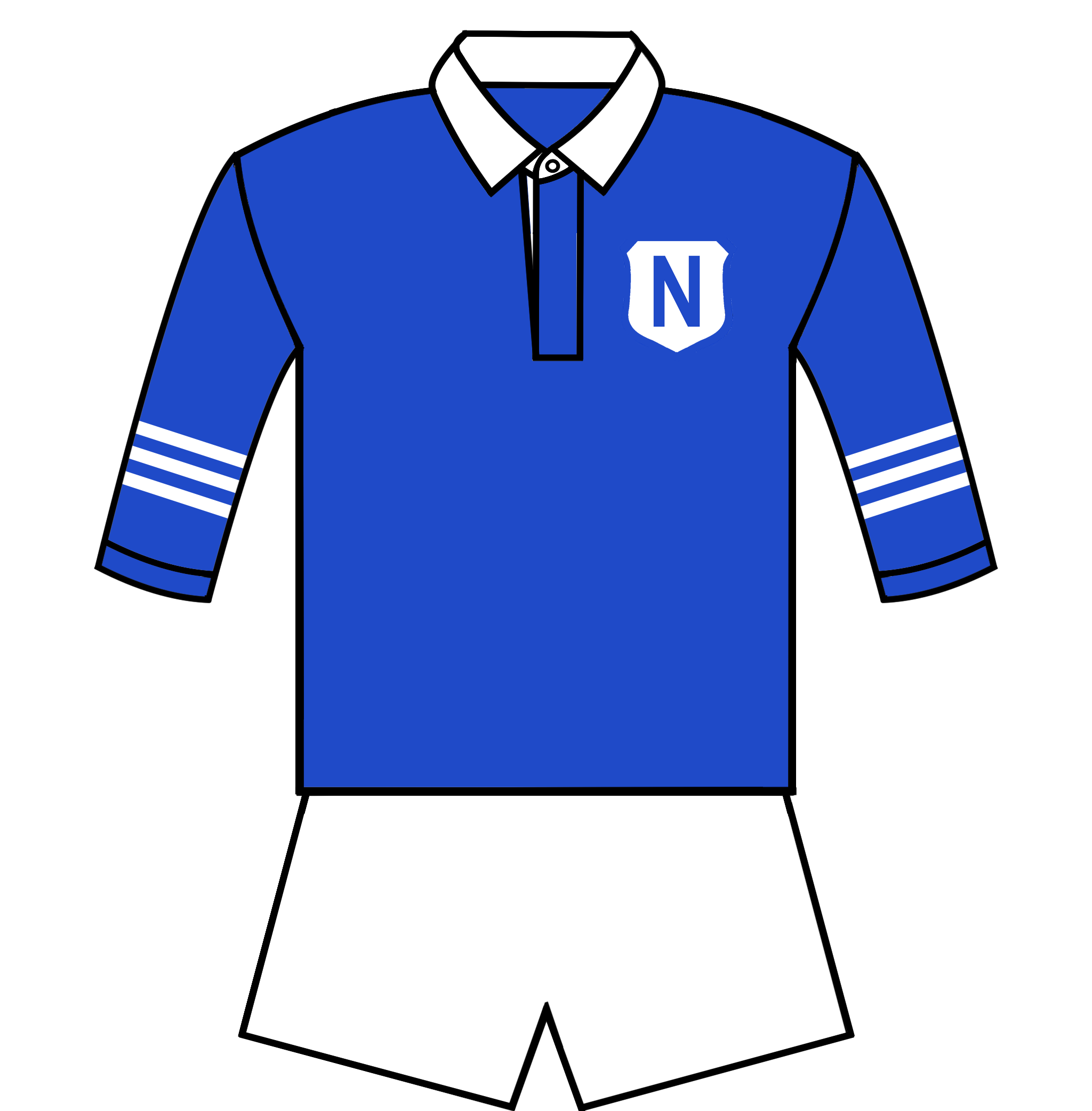
Newtown

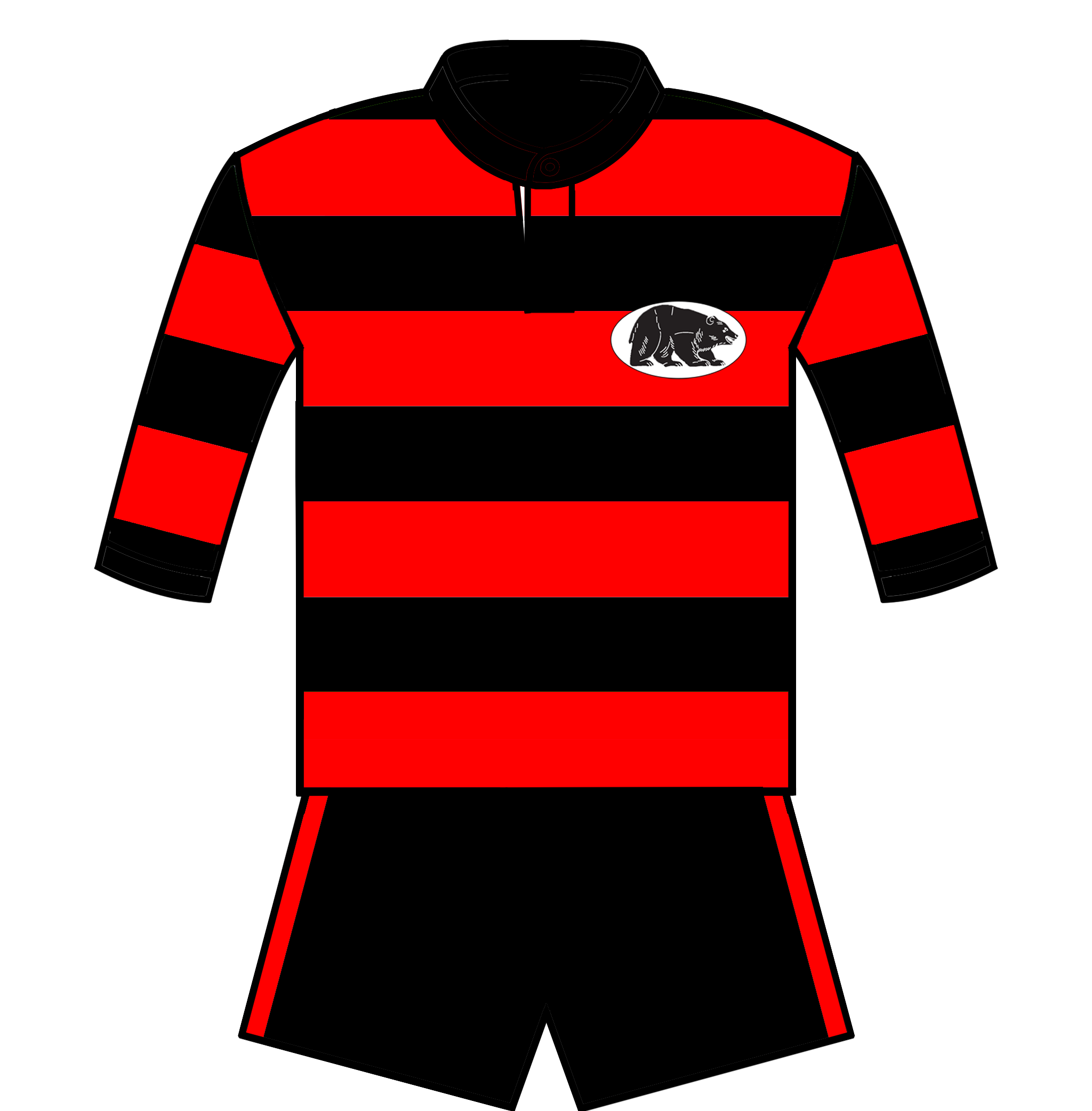
North Sydney

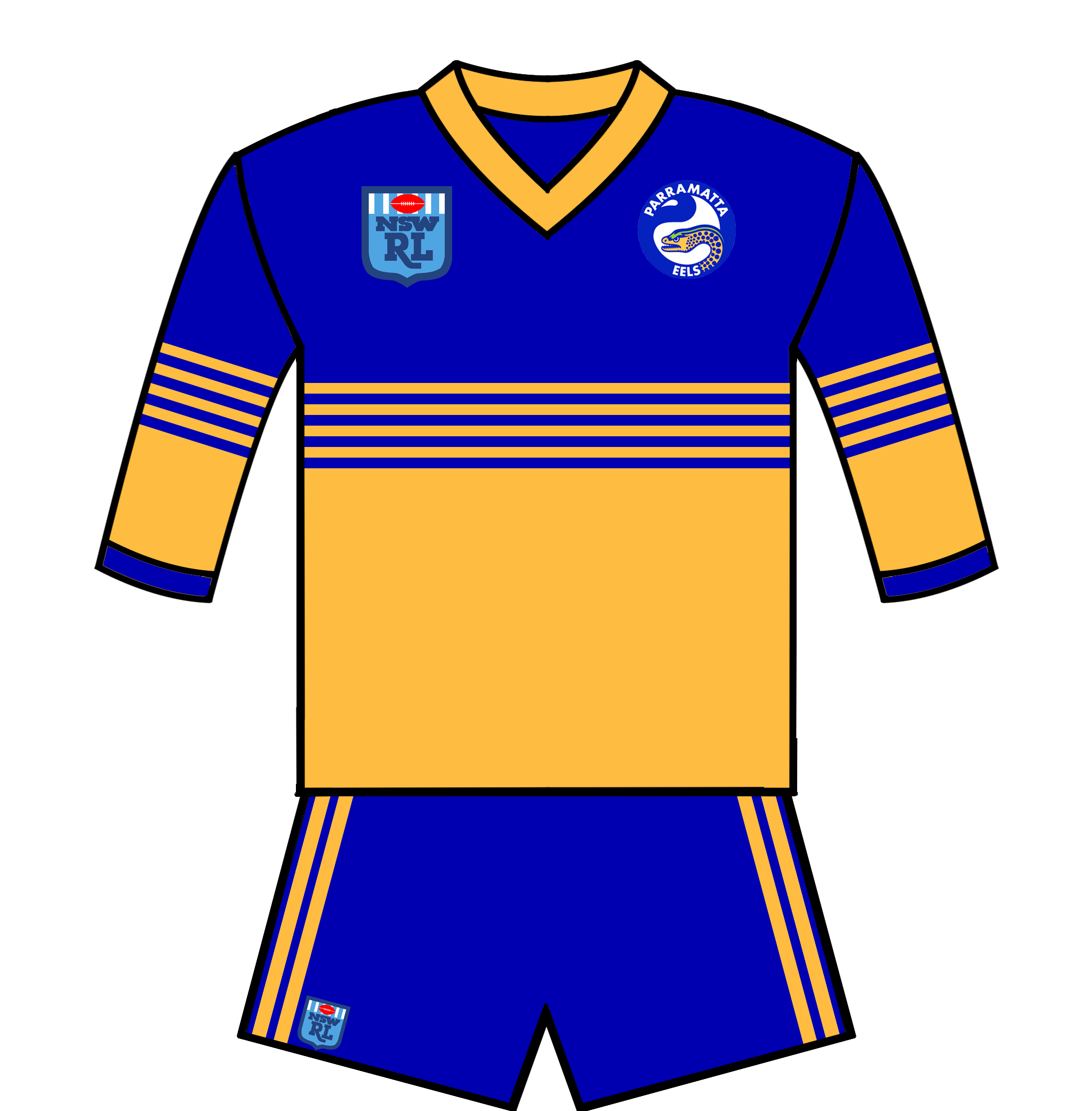
Parramatta

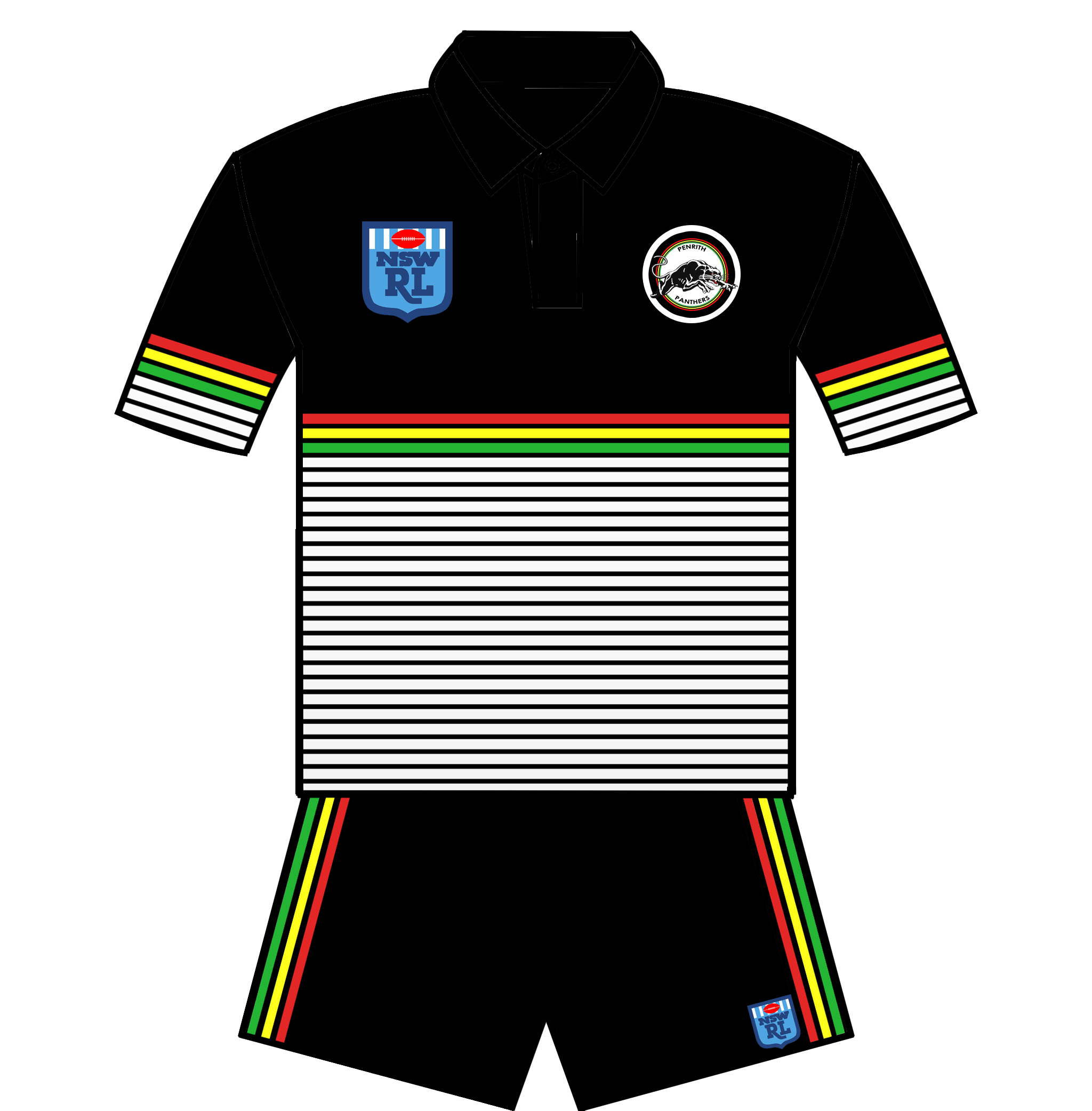
Penrith

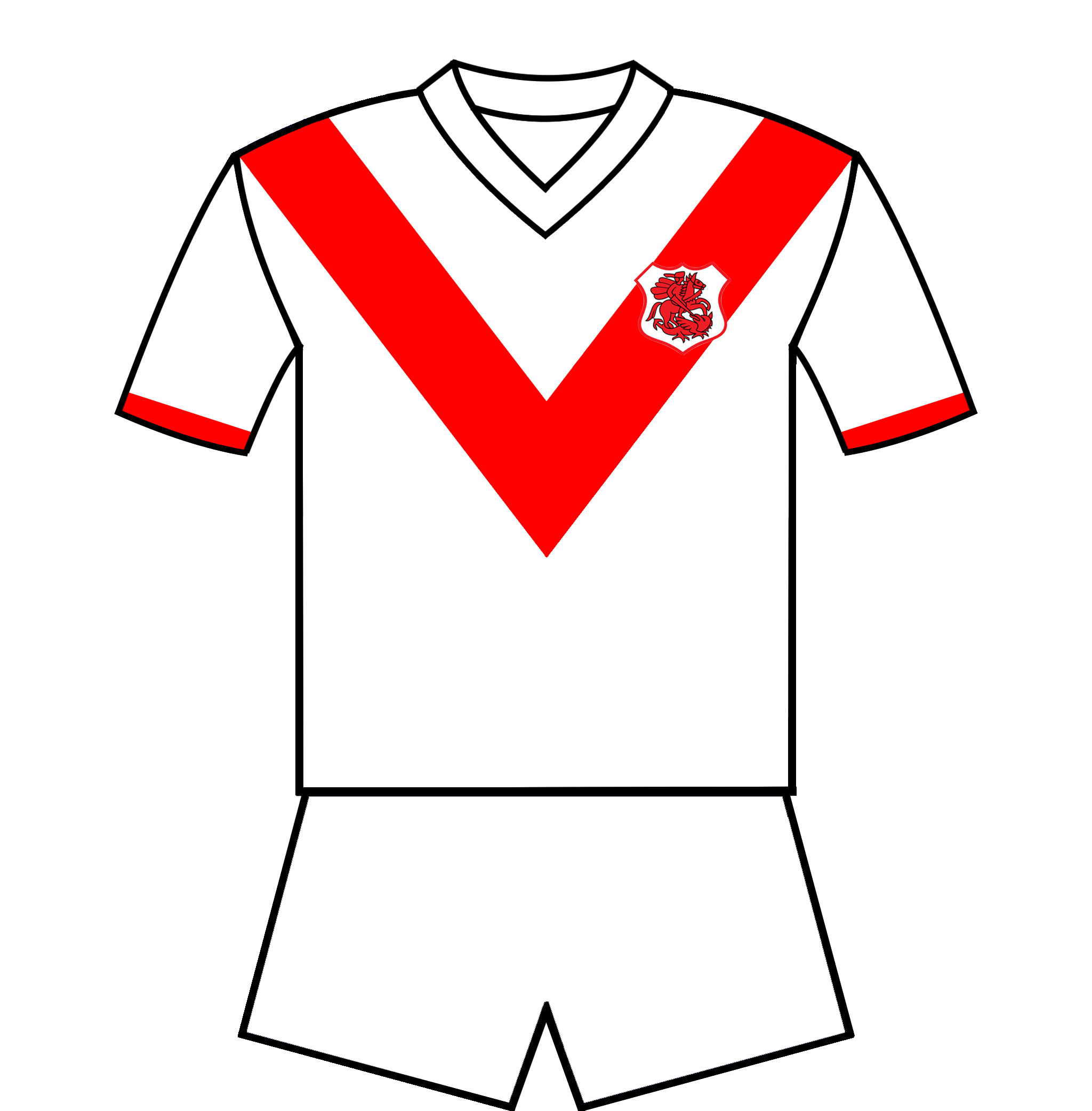
St. George Illawarra

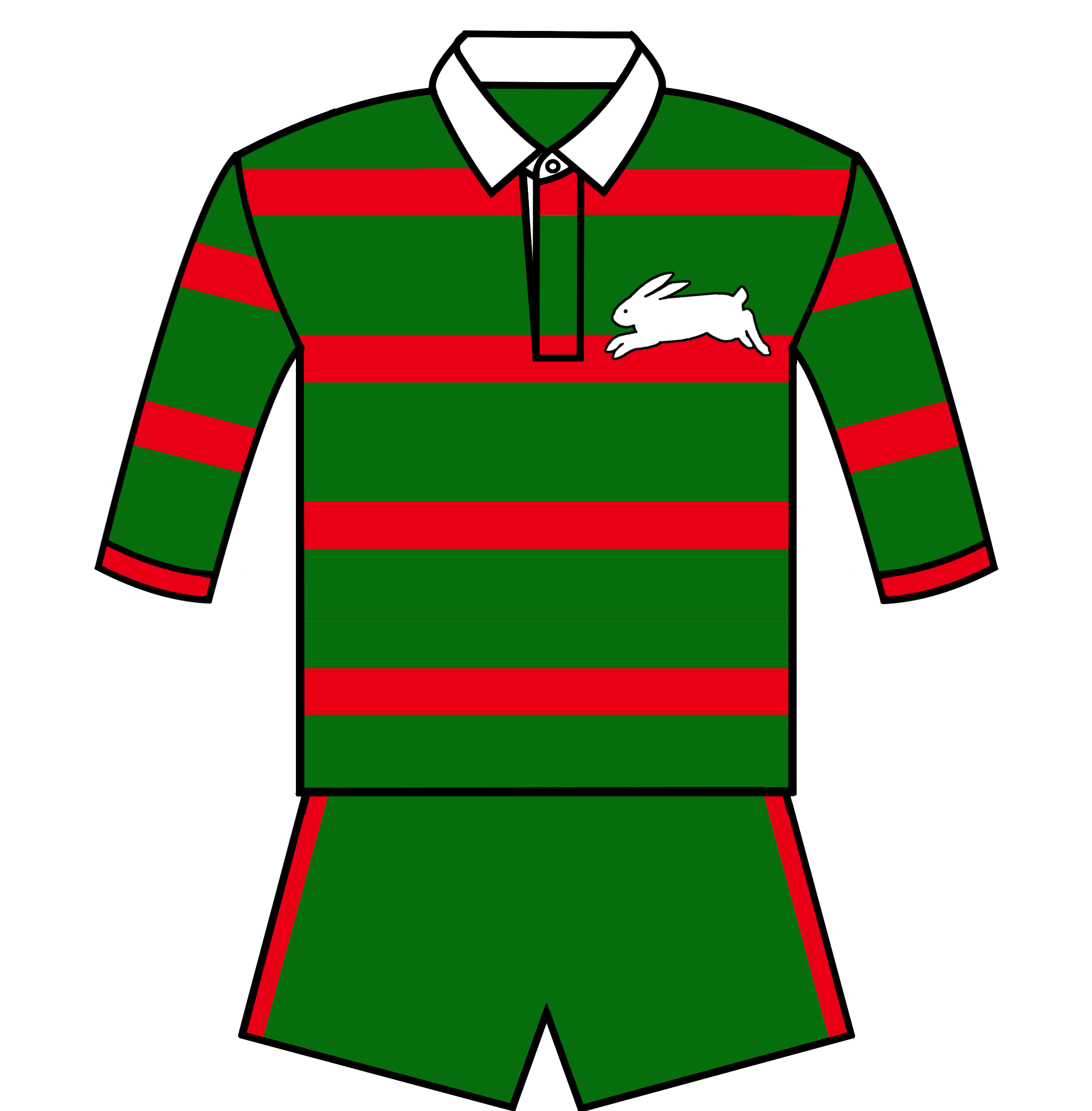
South Sydney

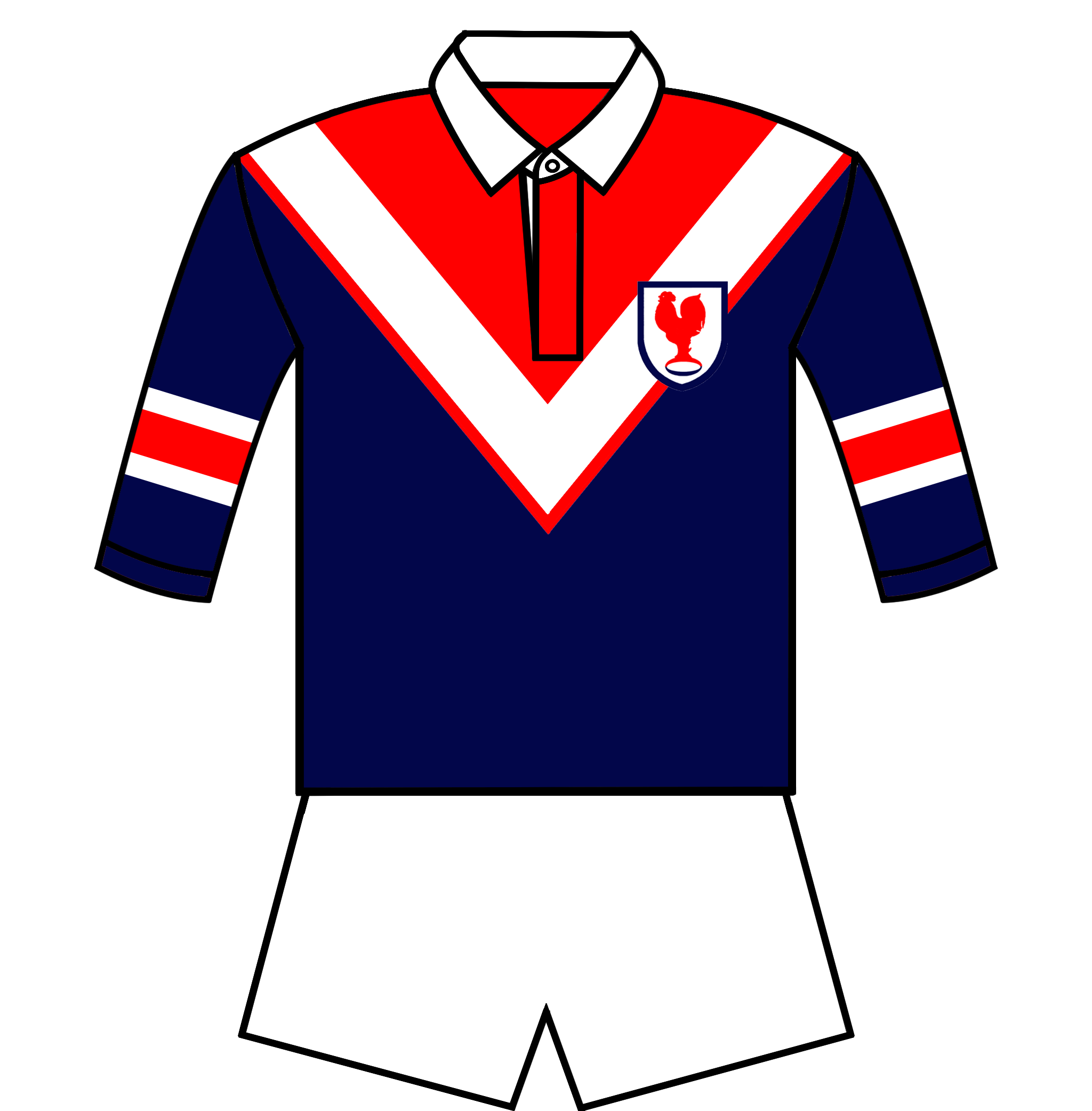
Sydney

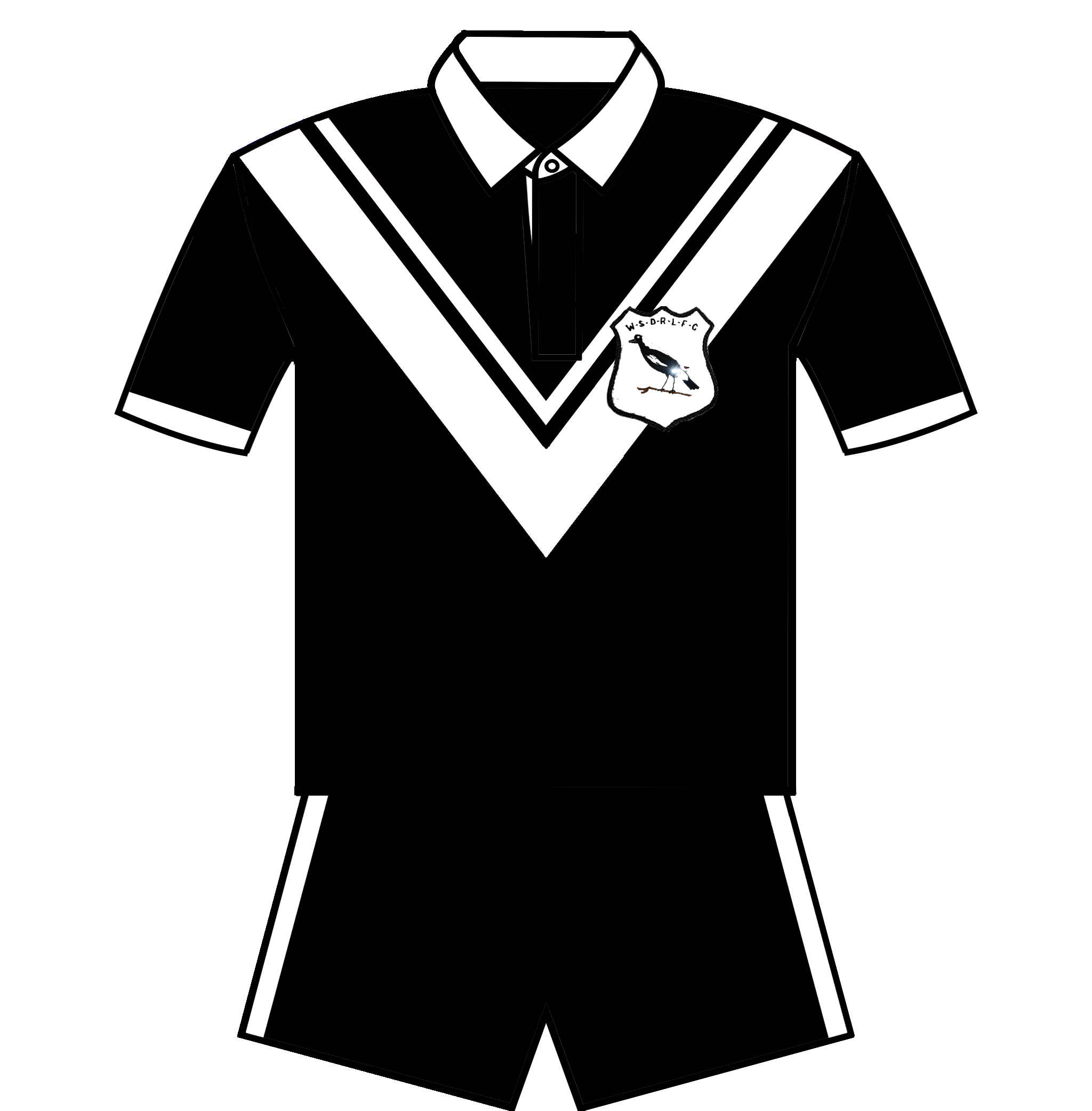
Western Suburbs

=== Former teams – NSW Cup ===
Of the 26 former clubs in the 21st century, 1 was each based in Australian Capital Territory, Queensland and Victoria, 2 were based in Auckland Region and the other 23 former clubs were based in New South Wales.

**New South Wales Cup**
Colors	Club	Est.	First	Last	City/ Cities	Titles	Last	Fate
	**Auckland Vulcans**		2008	2013	Auckland			Departed
	**Balmain Ryde**; **Eastwood Tigers**		2005	2012	Leichhardt			Departed
	**Bankstown City Bulls**	2008	2008	2009	Bankstown			Folded
	**Blacktown Workers**	2016	2017	2024	Sydney			Departed*
	**Central Coast Centurions**		2010	2011	Central Coast			Departed
	**Central Newcastle Rebels**	2008	2008	2008	Newcastle			Departed
	**Cronulla Cobras**	2008	2008	2008	Cronulla			Folded
	**Illawarra Cutters**	2012	2012	2017	Wollongong			Folded
	**Melbourne Storm**	1997	2010	2010	Melbourne			Departed*
	**Mount Pritchard Mounties**	1927	2012	2022	Sydney			Departed
	**New Zealand Warriors**	1994	2014	2020	Auckland			Departed*
	**Shellharbour City Dragons**		2009	2010	Shellharbour			Departed
	**Wentworthville Magpies**		2013	2018	Wentworthville			Departed
	**Windsor Wolves**		2008	2013	Windsor			Departed
	**Wyong Roos**		2005	2018	Wyong			Departed
Central Coast Bears returned to North Sydney after the failure of the Northern Eagles joint-venture; Manly Sea Eagles ended its partnership with Blacktown Workers at the end of the 2024 season, and re-entered their own NSW Cup Team for the 2025 season.; Melbourne Storm returned to the NSW Cup in 2026.; New Zealand Warriors returned to the NSW Cup in 2023.

=== Former teams – Reserve Grade/First Division/Premier League ===
Of the 24 former clubs in the 20th century, 1 was based in Auckland Region, South Australia and Western Australia, 4 were based in Queensland and the other 20 former clubs were based in New South Wales.

**New South Wales Cup**
Colors	Club	Est.	First Season	Last Season	City/ Cities	Venue/Venues	Titles	Last	Fate
	Enfield	1908	1908	1908	Enfield				Folded
	Belmore	1910	1910	1910	Belmore				Folded
	Banksia	1911	1911	1911	Banksia				Folded
	Waverley	1912	1912	1912	Waverley				Folded
	South Sydney Federals	1908	1910	1912	South Sydney				Folded
	Western Sydney	1912	1912	1913	West. Sydney				Folded
	Mosman	1910	1910	1914	Mosman				Folded
	Redfern	1911	1911	1914	Redfern				Folded
	Grosvenor	1911	1911	1915	Sydney				Folded
	Marrickville	1911	1911	1915	Marrickville				Folded
	Sydney	1908	1908	1916	Sydney				Folded
	Randwick	1915	1915	1916	Randwick				Folded
	Surry Hills	1912	1912/15	1912/16	Surry Hills				Folded
	Annandale Dales	1910	1910	1920	Annandale				Folded
	Glebe Dirty Reds	1908	1908	1929	Sydney	Wentworth Park	5	1921	Folded
	Sydney University Students	1920	1920	1937	Sydney				Departed
	Brisbane Broncos	1988	1988	1996†	Brisbane	Lang Park, QEII Stadium*			Departed
	Western/Perth Reds	1992	1995	1996	Perth	WACA Ground			Folded
	South Queensland Crushers	1992	1995	1997	Brisbane	Lang Park			Folded
	Adelaide Rams	1996	1997	1998†	Adelaide	Adelaide Oval Hindmarsh Stadium			Folded
	Auckland Warriors	1992	1995	1998†	Auckland	Mt Smart Stadium			Departed*
	Gold Coast-Tweed Giants	1988	1988	1998	Gold Coast	Seagulls Stadium*			Folded
	Gold Coast Seagulls	1988	1988	1998	Gold Coast	Seagulls Stadium*			Folded
	Gold Coast Chargers	1988	1988	1998	Gold Coast	Seagulls Stadium*			Folded
	Illawarra Steelers	1982	1982	1998	Wollongong	Wollongong Showground*			Merger
	St George Dragons	1921	1921	2000	Kogarah	Kogarah Oval*			Merger
	Balmain Tigers	1908	1908	1999	Leichhardt	Leichhardt Oval*			Merger
	North Queensland Cowboys	1992	1992	2001	Townsville	Willows Sports Complex*			Departed
	Central Coast Bears	2000	2000	2001	Central Coast	Central Coast Stadium			Departed²
	Central Coast Storm	1992	1992	2001	Central Coast	Morrie Breen Oval			Departed
	St Marys-Penrith Cougars		2003	2005	Penrith, St Marys	St Marys Stadium*			Departed
	Penrith Pumas		2007	2007	Penrith	Panthers Stadium*			Departed

- Gold Coast-Tweed Giants from 1988 to 1989, Gold Coast Seagulls from 1990 to 1995, Gold Coast Chargers from 1996 to 1999.

† The club also competed in the second grade/reserve grade of the 1997 Super League competition

*= First grade club ground/ largest ground in the area

== History ==
NSW Cup Logo until 2012

The NSW Cup was known as the Reserve Grade/Presidents Cup/First Division from 1908 until 2002, and the NSWRL Premier League from 2003 to 2007, the NSW Cup from 2008 to 2015, the Intrust Super Premiership NSW from 2016 to 2018, the Canterbury Cup NSW from 2019 to 2020. The competition's lineage follows that of the NSWRL Reserve Grade from 1908 onwards.

=== 20th century ===
The New South Wales Cup, run by the NSWRL, has been known by a variety of names and operated in several different ways since the inception of the NSWRL Premiership in 1908. Between 1908 and 1996, the competition was known as Reserve Grade and was competed for almost exclusively by reserve squads of each of the NSWRL Premiership Clubs, competing with that Club's name and colours. With the advent of the Super League war, and the resultant split competition in 1997, the NSWRL reconfigured the competition as the Presidents Cup. From 2002 until 2007, the competition was known as the NSWRL Premier League until it was reorganised into its present form as the New South Wales Cup in 2008.

=== 'Stand-alone' clubs ===
With the competitions having merged back together, and with six NSWRL Premiership clubs having merged or became joint-ventures into three new NRL clubs (St. George Dragons and Illawarra Steelers; North Sydney and Manly; Balmain Tigers and Western Suburbs) the competition became known as the First Division and included these sides competing under their original name and colours.

The inclusion of these non-NRL clubs (along with the return of the Newtown Jets in 2000) in the competition signalled a move away from the 'reserve squad' competition it had become and became increasingly differentiated from the NRL competition with games played at non-NRL venues such as North Sydney Oval, Marrickville's Henson Park and Western Weekender Stadium at St Marys.

Another trend that began during this period was the phenomenon of NRL clubs outsourcing competing teams, with several NRL clubs choosing not to field sides in this competition and rather field either merged entities (as in the St Marys Penrith Cougars and Balmain Ryde Eastwood Tigers, both formed with NSWRL Jim Beam Cup sides) or form agreements with another club to take their place in the competition, those players being eligible for NRL selection, such as the agreement between Newtown Jets and Sydney Roosters for the 2006 season.

=== NSW Cup Era ===
==== 2007–09 Expansion ====
In 2007, Bartercard Cup club Auckland Lions joined the competition.

In 2008 and 2009, Jersey Flegg Cup club Central Coast Storm fielded a team in the competition. The team was based on the NSW Central Coast but acted as a feeder club to the Melbourne Storm. In addition, the Panthers were replaced by the Windsor Wolves and the Sharks were replaced by the Cronulla-Sutherland Cobras. The Canberra Raiders withdrew from the competition on 1 August 2007. The Newcastle Knights also announced a joint venture with the Central Charlestown. The team used the original Central Newcastle Rebels Name. The Parramatta Eels also formed a joint-venture with the Wentworthville Magpies to act as their Feeder Club in the competition from 2008 onwards. The Saints decided to no longer run a Reserve Grade Side, but would use the St George District Rugby League & the Illawarra District Rugby League competitions instead as their Feeder Team/s.

Two new teams have been added to the competition. These two new teams will have both previously played in the Jim Beam Cup. The Shellharbour City Dragons, previously known as the Shellharbour Marlins, will be the St George-Illawarra Dragons feeder side. The Bankstown Bulls, who were known as the Sydney Bulls, will act as the Canterbury Bulldogs feeder side. Bankstown will still field a team in the Jim Beam Cup. The Manly Sea Eagles have withdrawn from the competition and will have a feeder team in the Queensland Cup. Newcastle had also withdrawn from the competition, discontinuing the link with the Central Newcastle Rebels.

==== 2010–12 Seasons ====
Season 2012 saw the return of feeder clubs for NRL teams St George Illawarra and Canberra. The Illawarra Steelers, in partnership with Illawarra Coal and the Illawarra Leagues Club re-entered a team into the league, the Illawarra Cutters. They previously acted as a feeder club to the Dragons. A Mounties Rugby League Club also entered the NSW Cup this season and is the Raiders' feeder club.

==== 2013–15 Expansion ====
The 2013 season saw Wyong Roos enter a team in the NSW Cup for the first time. It will not be a feeder team to any NRL team. 2013 was also the first time in Rugby League history that teams with the names Western Suburbs and Balmain would not field a team in the cup, they played as the Wests Tigers. There is a current state of ambiguity surrounding this joint venture, and it is suggested that both Wests and Balmain will return as two separate clubs once financial requirements are met.

In 2014 the Auckland Vulcans were replaced by a side from the New Zealand Warriors. The Penrith Panthers will also be returning to the competition in 2014, replacing Windsor, who remain in the Ron Massey Cup.

==== 2016–18: Intrust Super Premiership ====
Intrust Super Premiership Logo from 2016 to 2018

On 29 January 2016, it was announced that Intrust Super had secured naming rights for the competition for a three-year agreement The name would have been decided not to be confused with the Queensland-based competition the Intrust Super Cup.

On 5 July 2016, it was announced that starting the following season, the Blacktown Workers would become the feeder club for the Manly-Warringah Sea Eagles in a joint-venture agreement. The Blacktown Workers Sea Eagles made their NSW Cup debut in Round 1 of the 2017 Season with a defeat to the Newtown Jets, before finishing 10th in the regular season and subsequently missing a post-season berth.

In September, Intrust Super extended its naming rights partnership with the New South Wales State Cup through to the end of the 2018 season.

On 27 October 2017, it was announced that Illawarra would be replaced by The St George Illawarra Dragons for The 2018 Intrust Super Premiership NSW season as part of a restructure in the competition.

In late November 2017 it was announced that as part of a re-brand, the Western Suburbs Magpies would enter the competition from the following season acting as a feeder club to the Wests Tigers, who had previously competed under their own brand.

==== 2019–2020: Canterbury Cup NSW ====
On 2 March 2018, it was reported that the board of the Wyong Roos, feeder to Sydney Roosters since 2014, voted to cut all ties with the club at end of the 2018 season. As a result, the Wyong Roos did not take part in the 2019 Intrust Super Premiership. On 5 September 2018, it was announced that the North Sydney Bears would assume the status as the official feeder club to the Roosters NRL side until at least the end of the 2023 season, with Jason Taylor, a former North Sydney player and assistant coach to the Roosters, appointed head coach. Taylor, after leading the Bears to a third-place finish at the end of the regular season, was announced to have signed a two-year extension on 5 November 2019.

On 7 March 2019, it was announced that apparel company Canterbury of New Zealand won the rights to be the new naming partner of the NSW Cup competition which was renamed the Canterbury Cup NSW. The deal was announced to run to the end of the 2024 season. The NSWRL also announced that the new Western Sydney Stadium would host the grand final in each of those seasons under the deal.

South Sydney, having had a previous feeder relationship with North Sydney, would then field their own team in the Intrust Super Premiership, keeping the number of competing teams at 12.

On 10 October 2018, it was reported that the Parramatta Eels would field a team in the Intrust Super Premiership starting 2020, thus ending their relationship with the Wentworthville Magpies at this time. It was announced that former Wyong Roos coach, Rip Taylor, would coach the Magpies in their final season.

On Friday, 27 March 2020, after round one of the season was completed, the 2020 Canterbury Cup NSW competition was suspended, and subsequently cancelled due to the COVID-19 pandemic, with no premiers being crowned.

==== 2021–present: Knock-on Effect NSW Cup ====
On 8 June 2020, the New Zealand Warriors and Redcliffe Dolphins announced a partnership agreement, effectively withdrawing the Warriors from the Canterbury Cup competition. Through this initiative a number of players from outside the Warriors’ NRL squad will appear for the Dolphins in the Intrust Super Cup each week.

On 28 August 2020, the Canterbury-Bankstown Bulldogs announced a joint venture with the Mount Pritchard Mounties for two years. As part of the joint venture, the Mounties will represent Canterbury-Bankstown in the Canterbury Cup, ending their nine-year relationship with the Canberra Raiders. At the time the Canberra Raiders were set to go it alone in 2021 rather than form an affiliation with a NSW Cup side

On 10 November 2020, the NSWRL confirmed that the NSW Cup would return in 2021 with a 10-team competition, however Canterbury would no longer hold naming rights. A new naming rights partner was revealed prior to the season launch on 3 March 2021.

On 28 January 2021, it was announced that the Canberra Raiders would be returning to the competition, fielding their own team or the first time since the 2007 season, thus increasing the number of competing teams to 11 in 2021. The competition commenced on 13 March 2021.

On 3 March 2021, a new naming rights sponsor, The Knock-On Effect, was named at the launch of the 2021 season. The new partnership will be in place for the next three years replacing the previous sponsor, Canterbury NZ.

For the second consecutive year, the competition was cancelled on 10 August 2021, after completion of 15 out of 24 scheduled rounds, due to the ongoing COVID-19 pandemic.

On 29 October 2021, it was announced that the Canterbury-Bankstown Bulldogs would be running their own team in the NSW Cup in 2022, in addition to continuing their partnership with Mounties for a further season due to contractual obligations

The draw for the 2022 season was released on 17 December 2021, and announced a revision to the finals-system to a top five, a decrease from the previous top eight.

On 17 August 2022, the New Zealand Warriors announced they would be re-joining the NSW Cup after a three-year absence, ending their partnership with the Redcliffe Dolphins.

On 9 November 2022, the Sydney Roosters announced they would field their own team in the NSW Cup commencing in the 2023 season, ending their partnership with the North Sydney Bears from 2024 onwards.

On 20 September 2024, the Manly-Warringah Sea Eagles announced they would field their own team in the NSW Cup, commencing in the 2025 season. This ended their 9-year partnership with the Blacktown Workers that was established in 2016.

== Broadcast & Media ==
=== Television ===
The 2025 season broadcast deal features:

- One game per week on Fox League/Kayo Sports at either Saturday or Sunday 12:30pm or 11:45am
- Every Game Live on BarTV Sports.
- The Grand Final Live on Nine Now.

=== Radio ===
Hawkesbury Radio broadcast matches of the Penrith Panthers online during the season when played on non-NRL game days, selected other matches and all the finals matches.

Triple H Radio broadcast selected matches of the North Sydney Bears during the year plus selected finals matches.

There is also additional radio coverage of the finals series on 2GB Radio and 702 ABC Sydney.

=== Online ===
The NSWRL website upload highlights of every game of the NSW Cup. It also gives half time and full-time scores of the other games.

All NSW Cup matches are shown LIVE on NSWRL TV via BarTV Sports.

== Premiership Winners ==
- Reserve Grade/First Division
  (1908–2002)
- NSWRL Premier League
  (2003–2007)
- New South Wales Cup
  (2008–2015)
- Intrust Super Premiership NSW
  (2016–2018)
- Canterbury Cup NSW
  (2019–2020)
- The Knock-on Effect NSW Cup
  (2021–present)

Season	Grand Finals
Season	Premiers	Score	Runners-up	Decider	Report/s
1908	Eastern Suburbs	N/A	South Sydney	No Decider
1909	Eastern Suburbs	11–7	Glebe	Final	TSS
1910	Eastern Suburbs	5–2	Newtown	Final	EN
1911	Eastern Suburbs	12–0	Glebe	Final	ST
1912	Glebe	30–0	Redfern	Final	SMH
1913	South Sydney	10–3	Grosvenor	Final	Sun
1914	South Sydney	6–5	Eastern Suburbs	Final	Sun
1915	Balmain	9–3	Glebe	Final	Sun
1916	Balmain	6–4	Eastern Suburbs	Final	Sun
1917	South Sydney	N/A	Balmain	No Decider
1918	Glebe	N/A	South Sydney	No Decider
1919	Glebe	N/A	Western Suburbs	No Decider
1920	Glebe	N/A	South Sydney	No Decider	SMH
1921	Glebe	N/A	North Sydney	No Decider
1922	Newtown	10–2	Glebe	Final	Sun
1923	South Sydney	13–6	Balmain	Final	SMH
1924	South Sydney	N/A	Western Suburbs	No Decider
1925	South Sydney	14–2	Balmain	Final	TR
1926	South Sydney	25–13	North Sydney	Final	Sun
1927	South Sydney	16–5	St. George	Final	SGC
1928	Balmain	7–5	Eastern Suburbs	Final	Sun
1929	South Sydney	26–3	Western Suburbs	Final	Sun
1930	Balmain	5–0	South Sydney	Grand Final	Truth
1931	South Sydney	24–5	St. George	Final	Sun
1932	South Sydney	5–2	Newtown	Grand Final	Sun
1933	Balmain	15–12	South Sydney	Grand Final	Sun
1934	South Sydney	13–10	Balmain	Grand Final	Sun
1935	Eastern Suburbs	16–2	Balmain	Grand Final	Sun
1936	Western Suburbs	15–5	North Sydney	Final	Truth
1937	Eastern Suburbs	N/A	Newtown	No Decider
1938	St. George	9–4	Balmain	Grand Final	Sun
1939	Canterbury-Bankstown	13–0	North Sydney	Grand Final	Sun
1940	North Sydney	10–5	St. George	Grand Final	SGC
1941	Balmain	13–4	St. George	Grand Final	Sun
1942	North Sydney	15–5	St. George	Grand Final	Sun
1943	South Sydney	15–9	Balmain	Grand Final	Sun
1944	Balmain	11–9	North Sydney	Final	Sun
1945	South Sydney	11–7	Canterbury-Bankstown	Grand Final	Sun
1946	Balmain	8–5	Eastern Suburbs	Grand Final	Sun
1947	Newtown	6–2	Balmain	Grand Final	Sun
1948	Newtown	7–4	Western Suburbs	Grand Final	Sun
1949	Eastern Suburbs	30–7	Newtown	Grand Final	DT
1950	Balmain	10–6	St. George	Final	DT
1951	Newtown	10–6	St. George	Grand Final	SMH
1952	South Sydney	19–0	Canterbury-Bankstown	Grand Final	Sun
1953	South Sydney	17–11	Manly-Warringah	Grand Final	Sun
1954	Manly-Warringah	9–4	South Sydney	Grand Final	SH
1955	North Sydney	9–2	St. George	Grand Final
1956	South Sydney	10–6	Manly-Warringah	Grand Final
1957	Balmain	16–7	North Sydney	Grand Final
1958	Balmain	20–10	St. George	Grand Final	RLN
1959	North Sydney	19–10	St. George	Grand Final	RLN
1960	Manly-Warringah	17–6	Balmain	Grand Final	RLN
1961	Western Suburbs	9–3	Manly-Warringah	Grand Final	RLN
1962	St. George	19–0	Western Suburbs	Grand Final	RLN
1963	St. George	5–4	South Sydney	Grand Final
1964	St. George	7–2	South Sydney	Grand Final	RLN
1965	Balmain	9–7	St. George	Grand Final	RLN
1966	South Sydney	12–5	Balmain	Grand Final	RLN
1967	Balmain	11–7	South Sydney	Grand Final
1968	South Sydney	17–7	Manly-Warringah	Grand Final
1969	Manly-Warringah	10–6	Balmain	Grand Final
1970	Newtown	6–0	Eastern Suburbs	Grand Final
1971	Canterbury-Bankstown	11–5	St. George	Grand Final
1972	Canterbury-Bankstown	14–3	St. George	Grand Final
1973	Manly-Warringah	22–14	St. George	Grand Final
1974	Newtown	6–5	Eastern Suburbs	Grand Final
1975	Parramatta	21–13	Cronulla-Sutherland	Grand Final
1976	St. George	17–12	Cronulla-Sutherland	Grand Final
1977	Parramatta	11–9	Manly-Warringah	Grand Final
1978	Balmain	10–5	St. George	Grand Final
1979	Parramatta	22–2	Canterbury-Bankstown	Grand Final
1980	Canterbury-Bankstown	18–16	Parramatta	Grand Final
1981	Western Suburbs	19–2	Parramatta	Grand Final	CT
1982	Balmain	17–12	Eastern Suburbs	Grand Final	CT
1983	South Sydney	12–6	Manly-Warringah	Grand Final	CT
1984	Balmain	10–8	St. George	Grand Final
1985	St. George	22–16	Canberra Raiders	Grand Final	CT
1986	Eastern Suburbs	10–2	Parramatta	Grand Final
1987	Penrith	11–0	Manly-Warringah	Grand Final
1988	Manly-Warringah	22–2	Eastern Suburbs	Grand Final
1989	North Sydney	11–6	Parramatta	Grand Final	CT
1990	Brisbane	14–6	Canberra	Grand Final	CT VH
1991	North Sydney	12–6	Canberra	Grand Final	CT
1992	North Sydney	28–14	Balmain	Grand Final	CT
1993	North Sydney	5–4	Newcastle	Grand Final	CT
1994	Cronulla-Sutherland	14–4	Newcastle	Grand Final
1995	Newcastle	22–10	Cronulla-Sutherland	Grand Final
1996	Cronulla-Sutherland	14–12	Auckland	Grand Final
1997 (Note: Split competitions. This competition was known as Presidents Cup for this season, while the Super League competition was known as Reserve Grade (won by Canterbury Bulldogs). This competition was a merger of Reserve Grade and Third Grade (usually known as the Presidents Cup).)	Parramatta	26–16	Balmain	Grand Final
1998	Canterbury-Bankstown	26–22	Parramatta	Grand Final
1999	Parramatta	44–8	Balmain	Grand Final
2000	Canterbury-Bankstown	30–26	Penrith	Grand Final
2001	St George Illawarra	34–10	Parramatta	Grand Final
2002	Canterbury-Bankstown	24–22	St George Illawarra	Grand Final
2003	Canberra	31–6	St Marys-Penrith	Grand Final
2004	Sydney Roosters	30–8	St George Illawarra	Grand Final
2005	Parramatta	31–12	Sydney Roosters	Grand Final
2006	Parramatta	20–19	Newtown	Grand Final
2007	Parramatta	20–15	North Sydney	Grand Final
2008	Wentworthville	12–8	Newtown	Grand Final
2009	Bankstown City	32–0	Balmain	Grand Final
2010	Canterbury-Bankstown	24–12	Windsor	Grand Final
2011	Canterbury-Bankstown	30–28	Auckland	Grand Final	DT
2012	Newtown	22–18	Balmain	Grand Final	LU
2013	Cronulla-Sutherland	36–8	Windsor	Grand Final	SMH NMG
2014	Penrith	48–12	Newcastle	Grand Final	NSW ABC
2015	Newcastle	20–10	Wyong	Grand Final	NRL
2016	Illawarra	21–20	Mount Pritchard	Grand Final	NSW VH SSL
2017	Penrith	22–6	Wyong	Grand Final	VH NSW
2018	Canterbury-Bankstown	18–12	Newtown	Grand Final	NRL
2019	Newtown	20–15	Wentworthville	Grand Final	VH NSWRL
2020	Season was initially suspended after round 1 and was then cancelled due to the COVID-19 pandemic in Australia.
2021	Season was suspended Mid Season and then cancelled due to the ongoing COVID-19 pandemic in Australia.
2022	Penrith	29–22	Canterbury-Bankstown	Grand Final
2023	South Sydney	22–18	North Sydney	Grand Final
2024	Newtown	28–22	North Sydney	Grand Final	NSWRL
2025	NZ Warriors	30–12	St George Illawarra	Grand Final

Year	Premiers	Score	Runners-up	Match Information
Year	Premiers	Score	Runners-up	Date	Venue	Referee	Video
NSWRFL Reserve Grade Premiership (1908–83)
1908	Eastern Suburbs (R)	N/A	South Sydney (R)	No Grand Final
1909	(2) Eastern Suburbs (R)	11 – 7	Glebe (R)	4 September 1909	RAS Showground, Sydney	B. Finegan
1910	(3) Eastern Suburbs (R)	5 – 2	Newtown (R)	17 September 1910	RAS Showground, Sydney	L. Kearney
1911	(4) Eastern Suburbs (R)	12 – 0	Glebe (R)	16 September 1911	RAS Showground, Sydney	A. Ballerum
1912	Glebe (R)	30 – 0	Redfern United	17 August 1912	Wentworth Park, Sydney	A. Finegan
1913	South Sydney (R)	10 – 3	Grosvenor	16 August 1913	RAS Showground, Sydney	T. McMahon Snr
1914	(2) South Sydney (R)	6 – 5	Eastern Suburbs (R)	29 August 1914	RAS Showground, Sydney	J. Buchanan
1915	Balmain (R)	9 – 3	Glebe (R)	21 August 1915	RAS Showground, Sydney
1916	(2) Balmain (R)	6 – 4	Eastern Suburbs (R)	22 July 1916	RAS Showground, Sydney
1917	(3) South Sydney (R)	N/A	Balmain (R)	No Grand Final
1918	(2) Glebe (R)	N/A	South Sydney (R)	No Grand Final
1919	(3) Glebe (R)	N/A	Western Suburbs (R)	No Grand Final
1920	(4) Glebe (R)	N/A	South Sydney (R)	No Grand Final
1921	(5) Glebe (R)	N/A	South Sydney (R)	No Grand Final
1922	Newtown (R)	10 – 2	Glebe (R)	6 September 1922	Sydney Cricket Ground, Sydney	W. Neill
1923	(4) South Sydney (R)	13 – 6	Balmain (R)	12 September 1923	Sydney Cricket Ground, Sydney	A. Thornton
1924	(5) South Sydney (R)	N/A	Western Suburbs (R)	No Grand Final
1925	(6) South Sydney (R)	14 – 2	Balmain (R)	15 August 1925	Sydney Cricket Ground, Sydney	E. Kerr
1926	(7) South Sydney (R)	25 – 13	North Sydney (R)	18 September 1926	RAS Showground, Sydney	L. Dolan
1927	(8) South Sydney (R)	16 – 5	St George (R)	17 September 1927	RAS Showground, Sydney	L. Deane
1928	(3) Balmain (R)	7 – 5	Eastern Suburbs (R)	21 September 1928	RAS Showground, Sydney	B. Wales
1929	(9) South Sydney (R)	26 – 3	Western Suburbs (R)	14 September 1929	Sydney Sports Ground, Sydney	W. Fry
1930	(4) Balmain (R)	5 – 0	South Sydney (R)	4 October 1930	Sydney Sports Ground, Sydney	W. Fry
1931	(10) South Sydney (R)	24 – 5	St George (R)	5 September 1931	Sydney Sports Ground, Sydney	W. Neill
1932	(11) South Sydney (R)	5 – 2	Newtown (R)	24 September 1932	Sydney Sports Ground, Sydney	W. Fry
1933	(5) Balmain (R)	15 – 12	South Sydney (R)	16 September 1933	Sydney Sports Ground, Sydney	W. Fry
1934	(12) South Sydney (R)	7 – 2	Balmain (R)	15 September 1934	Sydney Sports Ground, Sydney	J. Murphy
1935	(5) Eastern Suburbs (R)	16 – 2	Balmain (R)	21 September 1935	Sydney Sports Ground, Sydney	T. McMahon Jnr
1936	Western Suburbs (R)	15 – 5	North Sydney (R)	12 September 1936	Sydney Cricket Ground, Sydney	T. McMahon Jnr
1937	(6) Eastern Suburbs (R)	N/A	Newtown (R)	No Grand Final
1938	St George (R)	9 – 4	Balmain (R)	10 September 1938	Sydney Sports Ground, Sydney	A. Davis
1939	Canterbury-Bankstown (R)	13 – 0	North Sydney (R)	9 September 1939	Sydney Sports Ground, Sydney	J. McGaulay
1940	North Sydney (R)	10 – 5	St George (R)	7 September 1940	Sydney Cricket Ground, Sydney	J. O'Brien
1941	(6) Balmain (R)	13 – 4	St George (R)	6 September 1941	Sydney Cricket Ground, Sydney	P. Lee
1942	(2) North Sydney (R)	15 – 5	St George (R)	12 September 1942	Sydney Cricket Ground, Sydney	A. Oxford
1943	(13) South Sydney (R)	15 – 9	Balmain (R)	4 September 1943	Sydney Cricket Ground, Sydney	G. Bishop
1944	(7) Balmain (R)	11 – 9	Newtown (R)	9 September 1944	Sydney Cricket Ground, Sydney	J. O'Brien
1945	(14) South Sydney (R)	11 – 7	Canterbury-Bankstown (R)	8 September 1945	Sydney Cricket Ground, Sydney	A. Oxford
1946	(8) Balmain (R)	8 – 5	Eastern Suburbs (R)	14 September 1946	Sydney Cricket Ground, Sydney	J. O'Brien
1947	(2) Newtown (R)	6 – 2	Balmain (R)	20 September 1947	Sydney Cricket Ground, Sydney	L. Williams
1948	(3) Newtown (R)	7 – 4	Western Suburbs (R)	18 September 1948	Sydney Cricket Ground, Sydney	C. Pearce
1949	(7) Eastern Suburbs (R)	30 – 7	Newtown (R)	10 September 1949	Sydney Cricket Ground, Sydney	A. Oxford
1950	(9) Balmain (R)	10 – 6	St George (R)	16 September 1950	Sydney Sports Ground, Sydney	G. Bishop
1951	(4) Newtown (R)	10 – 6	St George (R)	23 September 1951	Sydney Sports Ground, Sydney	A. Oxford
1952	(15) South Sydney (R)	19 – 0	Canterbury-Bankstown (R)	20 September 1952	Sydney Cricket Ground, Sydney	J. O'Brien
1953	(16) South Sydney (R)	17 – 11	Manly Warringah (R)	19 September 1953	Sydney Cricket Ground, Sydney	A. Oxford
1954	Manly Warringah (R)	9 – 4	South Sydney (R)	18 September 1954	Sydney Cricket Ground, Sydney	D. Lawler
1955	(3) North Sydney Bears (R)	9 – 2	St George (R)	17 September 1955	Sydney Cricket Ground, Sydney	J. O'Brien
1956	(17) South Sydney (R)	10 – 6	Manly Warringah Sea Eagles (R)	8 September 1956	Sydney Cricket Ground, Sydney	C. Pearce
1957	(10) Balmain Tigers (R)	16 – 7	North Sydney Bears (R)	21 September 1957	Sydney Cricket Ground, Sydney	C. Pearce
1958	(11) Balmain Tigers (R)	20 – 10	St George Dragons (R)	13 September 1958	Sydney Cricket Ground, Sydney	C. Pearce
1959	(4) North Sydney Bears (R)	19 – 10	St George Dragons (R)	15 August 1959	Sydney Cricket Ground, Sydney	C. Pearce
1960	(2) Manly Warringah Sea Eagles (R)	17 – 6	Balmain Tigers (R)	3 September 1960	Sydney Cricket Ground, Sydney	C. Pearce
1961	(2) Western Suburbs Magpies (R)	9 – 3	Manly Warringah Sea Eagles (R)	2 September 1961	Henson Park, Sydney	D. Lawler
1962	(2) St George Dragons (R)	19 – 0	Western Suburbs Magpies (R)	15 September 1962	Sydney Cricket Ground, Sydney	A. Neville
1963	(3) St George Dragons (R)	5 – 4	South Sydney Rabbitohs (R)	23 August 1963	Sydney Cricket Ground, Sydney	C. Pearce
1964	(4) St George Dragons (R)	7 – 2	South Sydney Rabbitohs (R)	19 September 1964	Sydney Cricket Ground, Sydney	F. Erickson
1965	(12) Balmain Tigers (R)	9 – 7	St George Dragons (R)	18 September 1965	Sydney Cricket Ground, Sydney	J. Harris
1966	(18) South Sydney Rabbitohs (R)	12 – 5	Balmain Tigers (R)	17 September 1966	Sydney Cricket Ground, Sydney	J. Bradley
1967	(13) Balmain Tigers (R)	11 – 7	South Sydney Rabbitohs (R)	16 September 1967	Sydney Cricket Ground, Sydney	L. Bruyeres
1968	(19) South Sydney Rabbitohs (R)	17 – 7	Manly Warringah Sea Eagles (R)	21 September 1968	Sydney Cricket Ground, Sydney	S. Samuelson
1969	(3) Manly Warringah Sea Eagles (R)	10 – 6	Balmain Tigers (R)	20 September 1969	Sydney Cricket Ground, Sydney	K. Holman
1970	(5) Newtown (R)	6 – 0	Eastern Suburbs Roosters (R)	19 September 1970	Sydney Cricket Ground, Sydney	K. Holman
1971	(2) Canterbury-Bankstown (R)	11 – 5	St George Dragons (R)	18 September 1971	Sydney Cricket Ground, Sydney	K. Page
1972	(3) Canterbury-Bankstown (R)	14 – 3	St George Dragons (R)	16 September 1972	Sydney Cricket Ground, Sydney	L. Bruyeres
1973	(4) Manly Warringah Sea Eagles (R)	22 – 14	St George Dragons (R)	15 September 1973	Sydney Cricket Ground, Sydney	L. Bruyeres
1974	(6) Newtown (R)	6 – 5	Eastern Suburbs Roosters (R)	21 September 1974	Sydney Cricket Ground, Sydney	K. Page
1975	Parramatta (R)	21 – 13	Cronulla-Sutherland Sharks (R)	20 September 1975	Sydney Cricket Ground, Sydney	K. Page
1976	(5) St George Dragons (R)	20 – 12	Cronulla-Sutherland Sharks (R)	18 September 1976	Sydney Cricket Ground, Sydney	G. Hartley
1977	(2) Parramatta (R)	11 – 9	Manly Warringah Sea Eagles (R)	17 September 1977	Sydney Cricket Ground, Sydney	J. Danzey
1978	(14) Balmain Tigers (R)	10 – 5	St George Dragons (R)	16 September 1978	Sydney Cricket Ground, Sydney	J. Danzey
1979	(3) Parramatta Eels (R)	22 – 2	Canterbury-Bankstown Bulldogs (R)	22 September 1979	Sydney Cricket Ground, Sydney	J. Danzey
1980	(4) Canterbury-Bankstown Bulldogs (R)	18 – 16	Parramatta Eels (R)	27 September 1980	Sydney Cricket Ground, Sydney	J. Danzey
1981	(3) Western Suburbs Magpies (R)	19 – 2	Parramatta Eels (R)	27 September 1981	Sydney Cricket Ground, Sydney	J. Gocher
1982	(15) Balmain Tigers (R)	17 – 12	Eastern Suburbs Roosters (R)	26 September 1982	Sydney Cricket Ground, Sydney	J. Danzey
1983	(20) South Sydney Rabbitohs (R)	12 – 6	Manly Warringah Sea Eagles (R)	25 September 1983	Sydney Cricket Ground, Sydney	B. Barnes
NSWRL Reserve Grade Premiership (1984–94)
1984	(16) Balmain Tigers (R)	10 – 8	St George Dragons (R)	23 September 1984	Sydney Cricket Ground, Sydney	C. Ward
1985	(6) St George Dragons (R)	22 – 16	Canberra Raiders (R)	29 September 1985	Sydney Cricket Ground, Sydney	M. Stone
1986	(8) Eastern Suburbs Roosters (R)	10 – 2	Parramatta Eels (R)	28 September 1986	Sydney Cricket Ground, Sydney	K. Roberts
1987	Penrith Panthers (R)	11 – 0	Manly Warringah Sea Eagles (R)	27 September 1987	Sydney Cricket Ground, Sydney	G. McCallum
1988	(5) Manly Warringah Sea Eagles (R)	22 – 2	Eastern Suburbs Roosters (R)	11 September 1988	Sydney Football Stadium, Sydney	G. Annesley
1989	(5) North Sydney Bears (R)	11 – 6	Parramatta Eels (R)	24 September 1989	Sydney Football Stadium, Sydney	M. Stone
1990	Brisbane Broncos (R)	14 – 6	Canberra Raiders (R)	23 September 1990	Sydney Football Stadium, Sydney	G. McCallum
1991	(6) North Sydney Bears (R)	12 – 6	Canberra Raiders (R)	22 September 1991	Sydney Football Stadium, Sydney	E. Ward
1992	(7) North Sydney Bears (R)	28 – 14	Balmain Tigers (R)	27 September 1992	Sydney Football Stadium, Sydney	G. Annesley
1993	(8) North Sydney Bears (R)	5 – 4	Newcastle Knights (R)	26 September 1993	Sydney Football Stadium, Sydney	B. Harrigan
1994	Cronulla-Sutherland Sharks (R)	14 – 4	Newcastle Knights (R)	25 September 1994	Sydney Football Stadium, Sydney	B. Harrigan
ARL Reserve Grade Premiership (1995–97)
1995	Newcastle Knights (R)	22 – 10	Cronulla-Sutherland Sharks (R)	24 September 1995	Sydney Football Stadium, Sydney	D. Manson
1996	(2) Cronulla-Sutherland Sharks (R)	14 – 12	Auckland Warriors (R)	24 September 1996	Sydney Football Stadium, Sydney	K. Jeffes
1997	(4) Parramatta Eels (R)	26 – 16	Balmain Tigers (R)	28 September 1997	Sydney Football Stadium, Sydney	K. Jeffes
NSWRL First Division (1998–02)
1998	(5) Canterbury-Bankstown Bulldogs (R)	26 – 22	Parramatta Eels (R)	27 September 1998	Sydney Football Stadium, Sydney	M. Oaten
1999	(5) Parramatta Eels (R)	44 – 8	Balmain Tigers (R)	26 September 1999	Stadium Australia, Sydney	K. Jeffes
2000	(6) Bulldogs (R)	30 – 26	Penrith Panthers (R)	27 August 2000	Stadium Australia, Sydney	T. Archer
2001	St George Illawarra Dragons (R)	34 – 10	Parramatta Eels (R)	30 September 2001	Stadium Australia, Sydney	R. Lawrence
2002	(7) Bulldogs (R)	24 – 22	St George Illawarra Dragons (R)	6 October 2002	Telstra Stadium, Sydney	T. Archer
NSWRL Premier League (2003–07)
2003	Canberra Raiders (R)	31 – 6	St Marys-Penrith Cougars	5 October 2003	Telstra Stadium, Sydney	T. Archer
2004	(9) Sydney Roosters (R)	30 – 4	St George Illawarra Dragons (R)	3 October 2004	Telstra Stadium, Sydney	G. Badger
2005	(6) Parramatta Eels (R)	31 – 12	Sydney Roosters (R)	2 October 2005	Telstra Stadium, Sydney	B. Cummins
2006	(7) Parramatta Eels (R)	20 – 19	Newtown Jets	1 October 2006	Telstra Stadium, Sydney	S. Hayne
2007	(8) Parramatta Eels (R)	20 – 15	North Sydney Bears	30 September 2007	Telstra Stadium, Sydney	J. Maxwell
New South Wales Cup (2008–Present)
2008	Wentworthville Magpies	12 – 8	Newtown Jets	5 October 2008	ANZ Stadium, Sydney	G. Sutton
2009	Bankstown City Bulls	32 – 0	Balmain-Ryde Eastwood Tigers	4 October 2009	ANZ Stadium, Sydney	A. Gee
2010	(8) Canterbury-Banktown Bulldogs (R)	20 – 12	Windsor Wolves	3 October 2010	ANZ Stadium, Sydney	D. Munro
2011	(9) Canterbury-Banktown Bulldogs (R)	30 – 28	Auckland Vulcans	2 October 2011	ANZ Stadium, Sydney	J. Stone
2012	(7) Newtown Jets	22 – 18	Balmain-Ryde Eastwood Tigers	30 September 2012	ANZ Stadium, Sydney	M. Noyen
2013	(3) Cronulla-Sutherland Sharks (R)	36 – 8	Windsor Wolves	6 October 2013	ANZ Stadium, Sydney	Z. Przeklasa-Adamski
2014	(2) Penrith Panthers (R)	48 – 12	Newcastle Knights (R)	28 September 2014	Allianz Stadium, Sydney	L. Nicholls
2015	(2) Newcastle Knights (R)	20 – 10	Wyong Roos	27 September 2015	Pirtek Stadium, Sydney	L. Nicholls
2016	Illawarra Cutters	21 – 20	Mount Pritchard Mounties	25 September 2016	Pirtek Stadium, Sydney	J. Stone
2017	(3) Penrith Panthers (R)	20 – 12	Wyong Roos	24 September 2017	Leichhardt Oval, Sydney	C. Treneman
2018	(10) Canterbury-Banktown Bulldogs (R)	18 – 12	Newtown Jets	23 September 2018	Leichhardt Oval, Sydney	A. Cassidy, D Oultram
2019	(8) Newtown Jets	20 – 15	Wentworthville Magpies	29 September 2019	Bankwest Stadium, Sydney	T. Smith, D. Oultram
2020	Competition Cancelled Due to Covid-19
2021	Competition Cancelled Due to Covid-19
2022	(4) Penrith Panthers (R)	29 – 22	Canterbury-Banktown Bulldogs (R)	25 September 2022	CommBank Stadium, Sydney	D. Furner
2023	(21) South Sydney Rabbitohs (R)	22 – 18	North Sydney Bears	24 September 2023	CommBank Stadium, Sydney	C. Paddy
2024	(9) Newtown Jets	28 – 22	North Sydney Bears	29 September 2024	CommBank Stadium, Sydney	K. Irons
2025	New Zealand Warriors (R)	30 – 12	St George Illawarra Dragons (R)	28 September 2025	CommBank Stadium, Sydney	D. Brady

=== Team Performance ===
Team	Winners	Runners-up	Years won	Years runner-up
South Sydney Rabbitohs (R)	21	10	1913, 1914, 1917, 1923, 1924, 1925, 1926, 1927, 1929, 1931, 1932, 1934, 1943, 1945, 1952, 1953, 1956, 1966, 1968, 1983, 2023	1908, 1918, 1920, 1921, 1930, 1933, 1954, 1963, 1964, 1967
Balmain Tigers (R)	15	14	1915, 1916, 1928, 1930, 1933, 1941, 1944, 1946, 1957, 1958, 1965, 1967, 1978, 1982, 1984	1917, 1923, 1925, 1934, 1935, 1938, 1943, 1947, 1960, 1966, 1969, 1992, 1997, 1999
Sydney Roosters (R)	8	8	1908, 1909, 1910, 1911, 1935, 1937, 1949, 1986	1914, 1916, 1928, 1946, 1970, 1974, 1982, 1988
North Sydney Bears (R)	8	4	1940, 1942, 1955, 1959, 1989, 1991, 1992, 1993	1926, 1936, 1939, 1957
Canterbury-Bankstown Bulldogs (R)	7	3	1939, 1971, 1972, 1980, 1998, 2000, 2002	1945, 1952, 1979
St George Dragons (R)	6	16	1938, 1962, 1963, 1964, 1976, 1985	1927, 1931, 1940, 1941, 1942, 1950, 1951, 1955, 1958, 1959, 1965, 1971, 1972, 1973, 1978, 1984
Manly Warringah Sea Eagles (R)	5	7	1954, 1960, 1969, 1973, 1988	1953, 1956, 1961, 1968, 1977, 1983, 1987
Parramatta Eels (R)	5	6	1975, 1977, 1979, 1997, 1999	1980, 1981, 1986, 1989, 1998, 2001
Glebe Dirty Reds (R)	5	4	1912, 1918, 1919, 1920, 1921	1909, 1911, 1915, 1922
Newtown Jets (R)	6	5	1922, 1947, 1948, 1951, 1970, 1974	1910, 1932, 1937, 1944, 1949
Western Suburbs Magpies (R)	2	5	1961, 1981	1919, 1924, 1929, 1948, 1962
Cronulla-Sutherland Sharks (R)	2	3	1994, 1996	1975, 1976, 1995
Newcastle Knights (R)	1	2	1995	1993, 1994
Penrith Panthers (R)	4	1	1987, 2014, 2017, 2022	2000
St George Illawarra Dragons (R)	1	1	2001	2002
Brisbane Broncos (R)	1	0	1990	—
Canberra Raiders (R)	0	3	—	1985, 1990, 1991
Redfern United	0	1	—	1912
Grosvenor	0	1	—	1913
Auckland Warriors (R)	0	1	—	1996

== Participating clubs by season ==
NSWRL First Division
1998	Canberra Raiders		Canterbury-Bankstown Bulldogs	Cronulla-Sutherland Sharks	Manly-Warringah Sea Eagles	Newcastle Knights		North Sydney	Parramatta Eels	Penrith Panthers	South Sydney	Sydney City Roosters	Balmain Tigers	Western Suburbs	Illawarra Steelers	St. George Dragons		
1999	Canberra Raiders		Canterbury-Bankstown Bulldogs	Cronulla-Sutherland Sharks	Manly-Warringah Sea Eagles	Newcastle Knights		North Sydney	Parramatta Eels	Penrith Panthers	South Sydney	Sydney City Roosters	Balmain Tigers	Western Suburbs	Illawarra Steelers	St. George Dragons		
2000	Canberra Raiders		Canterbury-Bankstown Bulldogs	Cronulla-Sutherland Sharks	Manly-Warringah Sea Eagles	Newcastle Knights	Newtown Jets	North Sydney	Parramatta Eels	Penrith Panthers	South Sydney	Sydney Roosters	Balmain Tigers	Western Suburbs	St. George-Illawarra Dragons			
2001	Canberra Raiders		Canterbury-Bankstown Bulldogs	Cronulla-Sutherland Sharks	Manly-Warringah Sea Eagles	Newcastle Knights	Newtown Jets	North Sydney	Parramatta Eels	Penrith Panthers	South Sydney	Sydney Roosters	Balmain Tigers	Western Suburbs	St. George-Illawarra Dragons			
2002	Canberra Raiders		Canterbury-Bankstown Bulldogs	Cronulla-Sutherland Sharks	Manly-Warringah Sea Eagles	Newcastle Knights	Newtown Jets	North Sydney	Parramatta Eels	Penrith Panthers	South Sydney	Sydney Roosters	Balmain Tigers	Western Suburbs	St. George-Illawarra Dragons			
NSWRL Premier League
2003	Canberra Raiders		Canterbury-Bankstown Bulldogs	Cronulla Sharks	Manly-Warringah Sea Eagles	Newcastle Knights	Newtown Jets	North Sydney	Parramatta Eels	St Mary's-Penrith Cougars	South Sydney	Sydney Roosters	Balmain Tigers	Western Suburbs	St. George-Illawarra Dragons			
2004	Canberra Raiders		Canterbury-Bankstown Bulldogs	Cronulla Sharks	Manly-Warringah Sea Eagles	Newcastle Knights	Newtown Jets	North Sydney	Parramatta Eels	St Mary's-Penrith Cougars	South Sydney	Sydney Roosters	Balmain Tigers	Western Suburbs	St. George-Illawarra Dragons			
2005	Canberra Raiders		Canterbury-Bankstown Bulldogs		Manly-Warringah Sea Eagles	Newcastle Knights	Newtown Jets	North Sydney	Parramatta Eels	St Mary's-Penrith Cougars	South Sydney	Sydney Roosters	Balmain Ryde Eastwood Tigers	Western Suburbs	St. George-Illawarra Dragons			
2006	Canberra Raiders		Canterbury-Bankstown Bulldogs	Cronulla-Sutherland Sharks	Manly-Warringah Sea Eagles	Newcastle Knights	Newtown Jets	North Sydney	Parramatta Eels	St Mary's-Penrith Cougars	South Sydney		Balmain Ryde Eastwood Tigers	Western Suburbs	St. George-Illawarra Dragons			
2007	Canberra Raiders		Canterbury-Bankstown Bulldogs	Cronulla-Sutherland Sharks	Manly-Warringah Sea Eagles	Newcastle Knights	Newtown Jets	North Sydney	Parramatta Eels	Penrith Pumas			Balmain Ryde Eastwood Tigers	Western Suburbs	St. George-Illawarra Dragons		Auckland Lions	
NSW Cup
2008			Canterbury-Bankstown Bulldogs	Cronulla Cobras	Manly-Warringah Sea Eagles	Central Newcastle Rebels	Newtown Jets	North Sydney	Wentworthville Magpies	Windsor Wolves			Balmain Ryde Eastwood Tigers	Western Suburbs			Auckland Vulcans	Central Coast Storm
2009			Bankstown City Bulls	Cronulla-Sutherland Sharks			Newtown Jets	North Sydney	Wentworthville Magpies	Windsor Wolves			Balmain Ryde Eastwood Tigers	Western Suburbs	Shellharbour City Dragons		Auckland Vulcans	Central Coast Storm
2010				Cronulla-Sutherland Sharks		Central Coast Centurions	Newtown Jets	North Sydney	Wentworthville Magpies	Windsor Wolves			Balmain Ryde Eastwood Tigers	Western Suburbs	Shellharbour City Dragons		Auckland Vulcans	Melbourne Storm
2011			Canterbury-Bankstown Bulldogs	Cronulla-Sutherland Sharks	Manly-Warringah Sea Eagles	Central Coast Centurions	Newtown Jets	North Sydney	Wentworthville Magpies	Windsor Wolves			Balmain Ryde Eastwood Tigers	Western Suburbs			Auckland Vulcans	
2012	Mount Pritchard Mounties		Canterbury-Bankstown Bulldogs	Cronulla-Sutherland Sharks	Manly-Warringah Sea Eagles	Newcastle Knights	Newtown Jets	North Sydney	Wentworthville Magpies	Windsor Wolves			Balmain Ryde Eastwood Tigers	Western Suburbs	Illawarra Cutters		Auckland Vulcans	
2013	Mount Pritchard Mounties		Canterbury-Bankstown Bulldogs	Cronulla-Sutherland Sharks	Manly-Warringah Sea Eagles	Newcastle Knights	Newtown Jets	North Sydney	Wentworthville Magpies	Windsor Wolves		Wyong Roos	Wests Tigers		Illawarra Cutters		Auckland Vulcans	
2014	Mount Pritchard Mounties		Canterbury-Bankstown Bulldogs	Cronulla-Sutherland Sharks	Manly-Warringah Sea Eagles	Newcastle Knights	Newtown Jets	North Sydney	Wentworthville Magpies	Penrith Panthers		Wyong Roos	Wests Tigers		Illawarra Cutters		New Zealand Warriors	
2015	Mount Pritchard Mounties		Canterbury-Bankstown Bulldogs		Manly-Warringah Sea Eagles	Newcastle Knights	Newtown Jets	North Sydney	Wentworthville Magpies	Penrith Panthers		Wyong Roos	Wests Tigers		Illawarra Cutters		New Zealand Warriors	
Intrust Super Premiership NSW
2016	Mount Pritchard Mounties		Canterbury-Bankstown Bulldogs		Manly-Warringah Sea Eagles	Newcastle Knights	Newtown Jets	North Sydney	Wentworthville Magpies	Penrith Panthers		Wyong Roos	Wests Tigers		Illawarra Cutters		New Zealand Warriors	
2017	Mount Pritchard Mounties		Canterbury-Bankstown Bulldogs		Blacktown Workers	Newcastle Knights	Newtown Jets	North Sydney	Wentworthville Magpies	Penrith Panthers		Wyong Roos	Wests Tigers		Illawarra Cutters		New Zealand Warriors	
2018	Mount Pritchard Mounties		Canterbury-Bankstown Bulldogs		Blacktown Workers	Newcastle Knights	Newtown Jets	North Sydney	Wentworthville Magpies	Penrith Panthers		Wyong Roos	Western Suburbs		St. George Illawarra Dragons		New Zealand Warriors	
Canterbury Cup NSW
2019	Mount Pritchard Mounties		Canterbury-Bankstown Bulldogs		Blacktown Workers	Newcastle Knights	Newtown Jets	North Sydney	Wentworthville Magpies	Penrith Panthers	South Sydney		Western Suburbs		St. George Illawarra Dragons		New Zealand Warriors	
2020	Mount Pritchard Mounties		Canterbury-Bankstown Bulldogs		Blacktown Workers	Newcastle Knights	Newtown Jets	North Sydney	Parramatta Eels	Penrith Panthers	South Sydney		Western Suburbs		St. George Illawarra Dragons		New Zealand Warriors	
The Knock-on Effect NSW Cup
2021	Canberra Raiders	Mount Pritchard Mounties			Blacktown Workers	Newcastle Knights	Newtown Jets	North Sydney	Parramatta Eels	Penrith Panthers	South Sydney		Western Suburbs		St. George Illawarra Dragons			
2022	Canberra Raiders	Mount Pritchard Mounties	Canterbury-Bankstown Bulldogs		Blacktown Workers	Newcastle Knights	Newtown Jets	North Sydney	Parramatta Eels	Penrith Panthers	South Sydney		Western Suburbs		St. George Illawarra Dragons			
2023	Canberra Raiders		Canterbury-Bankstown Bulldogs		Blacktown Workers	Newcastle Knights	Newtown Jets	North Sydney	Parramatta Eels	Penrith Panthers	South Sydney	Sydney Roosters	Western Suburbs		St. George Illawarra Dragons		New Zealand Warriors	
2024	Canberra Raiders		Canterbury-Bankstown Bulldogs		Blacktown Workers	Newcastle Knights	Newtown Jets	North Sydney	Parramatta Eels	Penrith Panthers	South Sydney	Sydney Roosters	Western Suburbs		St. George Illawarra Dragons		New Zealand Warriors	
2025	Canberra Raiders		Canterbury-Bankstown Bulldogs		Manly-Warringah Sea Eagles	Newcastle Knights	Newtown Jets	North Sydney	Parramatta Eels	Penrith Panthers	South Sydney	Sydney Roosters	Western Suburbs		St. George Illawarra Dragons		New Zealand Warriors	
2026	Canberra Raiders		Canterbury-Bankstown Bulldogs		Manly-Warringah Sea Eagles	Newcastle Knights	Newtown Jets	North Sydney	Parramatta Eels	Penrith Panthers	South Sydney	Sydney Roosters	Western Suburbs		St. George Illawarra Dragons		New Zealand Warriors	Melbourne Storm

== NRL State Championship ==
Since 2014, The NSW Cup Grand Final has been played on the same weekend as the Queensland Cup Grand Final, the weekend prior to the NRL Grand Final, allowing for the creation of the NRL State Championship which saw the NSW Cup premiers face off against the Queensland Cup Premiers as a curtain raiser to the NRL Grand Final, originally following the National Youth Competition Grand Final from 2014 to 2017 and following the NRL Women's Grand Final in their inaugural premiership year in 2018.

In 2019 the NRL State Championship was played prior the NRL Women's Grand Final. Newtown Jets became the fourth NSWRL team to win in as many years after the first two championships were won by the QRL.

The 2020 State Championship was cancelled due to the Queensland and New South Wales competitions being cancelled after Round 1 due to the COVID-19 pandemic, and the 2021 State Championship was cancelled due to the COVID-19 lockdown in Sydney

=== Champions: New South Wales Cup ===
- Illawarra Cutters (2016)
- Penrith Panthers (2017)
- Canterbury-Bankstown Bulldogs (2018)
- Newtown Jets (2019)
- Penrith Panthers (2022)
- South Sydney Rabbitohs (2023)
- Newtown Jets (2024)
- NZ Warriors (2025)

=== Matches ===
NRL Season	NRL State Championship				Player of the Match
NRL Season	Winners	Score	Runners-up	Venue	Player of the Match
2014	Northern Pride	32–28	Penrith Panthers	Stadium Australia	Javid Bowen
2015	Ipswich Jets	26–12	Newcastle Knights	Stadium Australia	Matt Parcell
2016	Illawarra Cutters	54–12	Burleigh Bears	Stadium Australia	Drew Hutchison
2017	Penrith Panthers	42–18	PNG Hunters	Stadium Australia	Kaide Ellis
2018	Canterbury-Bankstown Bulldogs	42–18	Redcliffe Dolphins	Stadium Australia	Josh Cleeland
2019	Newtown Jets	20–16	Burleigh Bears	Stadium Australia	Toby Rudolf
2020	Match was cancelled due to the COVID-19 pandemic lockdown in Australia.
2021	Match was cancelled due to the COVID-19 pandemic lockdown in New South Wales.
2022	Penrith Panthers	44–10	Norths Devils	Stadium Australia	J'maine Hopgood
2023	South Sydney Rabbitohs	42–22	Brisbane Tigers (Easts Tigers)	Stadium Australia	Tyrone Munro
2024	Norths Devils	20–18	Newtown Jets	Stadium Australia	Oryn Keeley
2025	NZ Warriors	50–20	Burleigh Bears	Stadium Australia

== See also ==
- NRL State Championship
- Queensland Cup
- Ron Massey Cup
- Sydney Shield
- Presidents Cup
- NSW Challenge Cup
- Rugby League Competitions in Australia
- Rugby league in New South Wales
