= 2018 NSW Cup season =

2018 Intrust Super Premiership NSW
- League: NSW Cup
- Duration: 24 Rounds + Finals (March-September 2018)
- Teams: 12
- Broadcast partners: Fox League, Nine Network

2018 season
- Premiership winners: Canterbury-Bankstown Bulldogs

The 2018 Intrust Super Premiership NSW season was the tenth season of the New South Wales Cup, the top rugby league competition administered by the New South Wales Rugby League. The competition acts as a second-tier league to the ten New South Wales-based National Rugby League clubs, as well the Canberra Raiders and New Zealand Warriors. The winner of the Premiership, the Canterbury-Bankstown Bulldogs, competed against the winner of the 2018 Queensland Cup, the Redcliffe Dolphins in the 2018 NRL State Championship, which they won 42-18. The Penrith Panthers were the defending champions, following their 20-12 victory against the Wyong Roos in the 2017 Grand Final.

== Teams ==
In 2018, 12 clubs fielded teams in the Intrust Super Premiership. Illawarra RLFC were renamed to the St George Illawarra Dragons to bring the club in line with the NRL’s ‘whole of game’ strategy, that will also see top-grade squads increased from 25 players to 30.

An under-20s competition will be run in parallel to the New South Wales Cup.

Colours	Team	NRL Feeder Club
	Blacktown Workers Sea Eagles	Manly warringah Sea Eagles
	Canterbury-Bankstown Bulldogs	Canterbury-Bankstown Bulldogs
	Mount Pritchard Mounties	Canberra Raiders
	New Zealand Warriors	New Zealand Warriors
	Newcastle Knights	Newcastle Knights
	Newtown Jets	Cronulla-Sutherland Sharks
	North Sydney Bears	South Sydney Rabbitohs
	Penrith Panthers	Penrith Panthers
	St George Illawarra Dragons	St George Illawarra Dragons
	Wentworthville Magpies	Parramatta Eels
	Western Suburbs Magpies	Wests Tigers
	Wyong Roos	Sydney Roosters

== Ladder ==
Pos	Team	Pld	W	D	L	B	PF	PA	PD	Pts
1	Penrith Panthers	24	16	2	4	2	550	410	140	38
2	St George Illawarra Dragons	24	14	0	8	2	494	414	80	32
3	Newtown Jets	24	12	2	8	2	607	419	188	30
4	Canterbury-Bankstown Bulldogs	24	13	0	9	2	537	452	85	30
5	Western Suburbs Magpies	24	12	0	10	2	477	473	4	28
6	Mount Pritchard Mounties	24	11	0	11	2	532	461	71	26
7	New Zealand Warriors	24	10	0	12	2	429	489	-60	24
8	Wyong Roos	24	9	2	11	2	501	579	-78	24
9	Blacktown Workers Sea Eagles	24	8	2	12	2	476	496	-20	22
10	Wentworthville Magpies	24	9	0	13	2	436	583	-147	22
11	North Sydney Bears	24	7	2	13	2	479	532	-53	20
12	Newcastle Knights	24	5	2	15	2	379	589	-210	16

- Teams highlighted in green have qualified for the finals
- The team highlighted in blue has clinched the minor premiership
- The team highlighted in red has clinched the wooden spoon

== Finals ==
Home	Score	Away	Match Information			
Home	Score	Away	Date and Time	Venue	Referee(s)	Crowd
QUALIFYING AND ELIMINATION FINALS
Penrith Panthers	28 – 18	Canterbury-Bankstown Bulldogs	Saturday 1 September	Penrith Stadium		1,000
Mount Pritchard Mounties	21 – 20	New Zealand Warriors	Saturday 1 September	Penrith Stadium		1,000
Western Suburbs Magpies	14 – 18	Wyong Roos	Sunday 2 September	Penrith Stadium		1,000
St George Illawarra Dragons	28 – 26	Newtown Jets	Sunday 2 September	Penrith Stadium		1,000
SEMI-FINALS
Newtown Jets	34 – 16	Mount Pritchard Mounties	Saturday 8 September	Netstrata Jubilee Stadium		1,000
Canterbury-Bankstown Bulldogs	34 – 24	Wyong Roos	Sunday 9 September	Netstrata Jubilee Stadium		1,000
PRELIMINARY FINALS
Penrith Panthers	24 – 28	Newtown Jets	Saturday 15 September	Leichhardt Oval		2,000
St George Illawarra Dragons	26 – 28	Canterbury-Bankstown Bulldogs	Sunday 16 September	Leichhardt Oval		1,000
GRAND FINAL
Newtown Jets	12 – 18	Canterbury-Bankstown Bulldogs	Sunday 22 September	Leichhardt Oval		6,000

== NRL State Championship ==
As premiers of the NSW Cup, the Cannterbury-Bankstown Bulldogs faced Queensland Cup premiers Redcliffe Dolphins in the NRL State Championship match.

Sunday, 30 September
3:40pm (AEST)

Canterbury-Bankstown Bulldogs	42 – 18	Redcliffe Dolphins
Tries: Josh Cleeland (36', 38') 2 Rhyse Martin (6') 1 Chris Smith (47') 1 Renouf To'omaga (52') 1 Jayden Okunbor (72') 1 Fa'amanu Brown (77') 1 Goals: Rhyse Martin 5/6 (8', 37', 48', 54', 58' pen); Greg Eastwood 1/1 (74'); Josh Cleeland 1/1 (78')	1st: 16 – 6; 2nd: 26 – 12; NRL Stats; Report	Tries: 2 (30', 60') Kotoni Staggs; 1 (74') James Taylor; Goals: 2/2 Bryce Donovan (61', 75'); 1/1 Kotoni Staggs (31')

ANZ Stadium, Sydney
Referee: Adam Cassidy, Liam Kennedy

== Television Broadcast ==
Fox League will continue to broadcast a game per round, however Channel 9 will also be broadcasting a game per round starting with the 2018 for the first time.
