= Shellharbour City Dragons =

Australian rugby league club, based in Shellharbour, NSW

Club information
- Full name: Shellharbour City Dragons Rugby League Club
- Nickname(s): Dragons
- Short name: Shellharbour
- Colours: White, red-vee, yellow piping
- Founded: 2007; 18 years ago (as Shellharbour City Marlins)
- Exited: 2010; 15 years ago

Former details
- Ground(s): Ron Costello Oval
- Coach: Terry Gilogley
- Competition: New South Wales Cup

The Shellharbour City Dragons are an Australian rugby league football club based in the Shellharbour, New South Wales. They currently are not competing in any competitions and formerly competed in the New South Wales Cup in 2009 and 2010 and acted as a feeder club to the NRL club St. George Illawarra Dragons.

== History ==
The Shellharbour City Dragons were formed from current Illwarra Carlton League and former Group 7 Rugby League member, the Shellharbour Sharks. The Sharks administration still run this version of Shellharbour City representation as well as the other Sharks sides. The Dragons were established in 2007 as the Shellharbour City Marlins to act as a feeder club to the St George Illawarra Dragons, initially entering the NSWRL Jim Beam Cup with the thought in mind to gain entry into the NSW Cup, a feat achieved in 2009. When this occurred, the name was converted from Marlins to Dragons to further enhance the association between the two clubs. In 2011, the Dragons failed to come up with money to field a team in the NSW Cup, so currently the club is taking a hiatus from this competition with an aim to return in 2012.
