= Cronulla-Sutherland Cobras =

Club information
- Full name: Cronulla-Sutherland Cobras
- Founded: 2008
- Website: sharks.com.au

Current details
- Competition: New South Wales Cup

The Cronulla-Sutherland Cobras were an NSWRL rugby league joint venture between the Cronulla-Sutherland Sharks and The Cobras Junior Rugby League Club. In 2008 they competed in the New South Wales Cup , a new state premier competition to replace The NSWRL Premier League. The Premier League is a second-tier rugby league competition played in New South Wales, administered by the NSWRL and run concurrently with the National Rugby League (NRL). The Cobras were a feeder team to the NRL side the Cronulla-Sutherland Sharks.

In 2009 they were replaced by the Cronulla-Sutherland Sharks, currently a reserve team for the Cronulla-Sutherland Sharks and the Melbourne Storm NRL teams.

== See also ==
- Rugby league in New South Wales
