= 2011 New South Wales Cup =

- League: New South Wales Cup
- Teams: 11
- Premiers: Canterbury-Bankstown Bulldogs
- Runners-up: Auckland Vulcans
- Minor Premiers: Canterbury-Bankstown Bulldogs

The 2011 New South Wales Cup was the 104th season of New South Wales's top-level statewide rugby league competition. The competition was contested by eleven teams over a 30-week season (including Finals), which concluded with the 2011 Grand Final at ANZ Stadium in Sydney.

== Competition changes ==
Melbourne Storm exited the competition after the 2010 season, reducing the number of teams to 11.

== Season summary ==
Reigning premiers Canterbury-Bankstown Bulldogs won the minor premiership, three points clear of the Auckland Vulcans. This was Canterbury's second successive minor premiership.

== Ladder ==
2011 New South Wales Cup
Pos	Team	Pld	W	D	L	B	PF	PA	PD	Pts
1	Canterbury-Bankstown Bulldogs (P)	22	17	0	5	3	666	440	+226	40
2	Auckland Vulcans	23	16	1	6	2	810	527	+283	37
3	Cronulla Sharks	23	16	1	6	2	656	447	+209	37
4	Newtown Jets	23	15	1	7	2	578	464	+114	35
5	Wentworthville Magpies	23	12	1	10	2	519	602	-83	29
6	North Sydney Bears	22	9	1	12	3	539	477	+62	25
7	Central Coast Centurions	23	10	1	12	2	575	651	-76	25
8	Balmain Ryde-Eastwood Tigers	22	6	2	14	3	427	520	-93	20
9	Western Suburbs Magpies	23	7	1	15	2	442	624	-182	19
10	Windsor Wolves	23	6	1	16	2	459	702	-243	17
11	Manly-Warringah Sea Eagles	23	6	0	17	2	452	669	-217	16

== Finals series ==
Home	Score	Away	Match information
Home	Score	Away	Date and time	Venue
Semi-finals
Canterbury-Bankstown Bulldogs	24 – 22	Balmain Ryde-Eastwood Tigers	10 September 2011, 2:00pm	Belmore Sports Ground
Newtown Jets	34 – 29	Wentworthville Magpies	10 September 2011, 3:00pm	Henson Park
Auckland Vulcans	28 – 14	Central Coast Centurions	11 September 2011, 1:00pm	Mt Smart Stadium
Cronulla Sharks	28 – 20	North Sydney Bears	11 September 2011, 3:00pm	Toyota Stadium
Semi-finals
Cronulla Sharks	36 – 34	Wentworthville Magpies	18 September 2011, 1:00pm	Leichhardt Oval
Newtown Jets	16 – 17	North Sydney Bears	18 September 2011, 3:00pm	Leichhardt Oval
Preliminary Finals
Auckland Vulcans	30 – 26	Cronulla Sharks	25 September 2011, 1:00pm	Leichhardt Oval
Canterbury-Bankstown Bulldogs	28 – 10	North Sydney Bears	25 September 2011, 3:00pm	Leichhardt Oval
Grand Final
Canterbury-Bankstown Bulldogs	30 – 28	Auckland Vulcans	2 October 2011, 12:05pm	ANZ Stadium

== Grand final ==
A try on the siren by Jonathan Wright secured the Canterbury-Bankstown Bulldogs their third straight NSW Cup title, triumphing 30–28 over the Auckland Vulcans in the Grand Final at ANZ Stadium. The Bulldogs led by 8 points twice in the second half only to surrender both leads, with a Vulcans try in the 75th minute to Ivan Penehe seeing them take the lead 28–26. With their backs to the wall the Bulldogs secured a turnover 25 metres from the Vulcans line with 60 seconds on the clock, and after sending the ball from side to side Josh Reynolds passed the ball to Wright, who evaded the defence to score the match winner as the siren sounded.

2011 New South Wales Cup Grand Final

Sunday, 2 October
12:05 pm

Canterbury-Bankstown Bulldogs	30 – 28	Auckland Vulcans
Tries: 6 Wright; Lett; Cutler; Romelo; Goals: 3 Goodwin (3/5); Morrin (0/1)	1st: 10–12; 2nd: 20–16; Report:	Tries: 5 Peace; Fisiiahi; Godinet; Pehehe; Goals: 4 Brett Seymour (4/5)

ANZ Stadium
Referee: Jon Stone

== See also ==
- 2011 NRL season
- 2011 Queensland Cup
