= 2025 NSWRL Major Competitions =

Rugby league season in New South Wales

The New South Wales Rugby League administered several Major Competitions during the 2025 season. This included six men's competitions, two women's competitions and an under 21s competition. Along with the Queensland Rugby League, these competitions feed into the National Rugby League.

== Tier 1 Competitions ==
=== New South Wales Cup ===
2025 Knock-On Effect NSW Cup
- Duration: TBA
- Teams: 13
- Broadcast partners: Bar TV Sports

The New South Wales Cup (named the Knock-On Effect NSW Cup for sponsorship reasons) is the premier men's Rugby League competition in New South Wales. Nationally, along with the Queensland Cup, the New South Wales Cup is a Tier 2 competition and feeds into the Tier 1 National Rugby League.

==== Teams ====
There will be 13 teams in the 2025 competition, the same number as 2024.

The competition features 10 reserve teams from the NRL competition and 3 standalone clubs who have feeder arrangements with NRL teams.

In April 2023, the Papua New Guinea based Port Moresby Vipers submitted a bid to join the NSW Cup. As of November 2024, that bid is still ongoing.

In September 2024, Manly Warringah announced they were ending their affiliation with Blacktown Workers so they could field their own reserves team in the 2025 NSW Cup.

Colours	Club	NRL Affiliate	Home ground(s)	Head coach
	Canberra Raiders (R)		GIO Stadium, Raiders Belconnen	Chris Lewis
	Canterbury-Bankstown Bulldogs (R)		Accor Stadium, Belmore Sports Ground	Michael Potter
	Manly Warringah Sea Eagles (R)		4 Pines Park	Guy Williams
	New Zealand Warriors (R)		Go Media Stadium, North Harbour Stadium, Waitakere Stadium	David Tangata-Toa
	Newcastle Knights (R)		McDonald Jones Stadium	Michael Dobson
	Newtown Jets	Cronulla-Sutherland Sharks	Henson Park	George Ndaira
	North Sydney Bears	Melbourne Storm	North Sydney Oval	Tony Barnes
	Parramatta Eels (R)		CommBank Stadium, Eric Tweedale Stadium	Nathan Cayless
	Penrith Panthers (R)		CommBank Stadium, St Marys Leagues Stadium	Ben Harden
	South Sydney Rabbitohs (R)		Accor Stadium, Redfern Oval	Wayne Collins
	St George Illawarra Dragons (R)		Collegians Sporting Complex, WIN Stadium, Jubilee Stadium	Willie Talau
	Sydney Roosters (R)		Wentworth Park, Allianz Stadium	Brett Morris
	Western Suburbs Magpies	Wests Tigers	Lidcombe Oval, Campbelltown Sports Stadium, Leichhardt Oval	Aaron Payne

State Map	Sydney Map
Home Venues	Home Venues

==== Ladder ====
Pos	Team	Pld	W	D	L	B	PF	PA	PD	Pts	Qualification
1	New Zealand Warriors (R)	24	21	1	2	2	797	386	+411	47	Minor Premiers & Major Semi-Final
2	St George Illawarra Dragons (R)	24	15	2	7	2	673	574	+109	36	Qualifying Final
3	Parramatta Eels (R)	24	15	1	8	2	641	631	+10	35	Qualifying Final
4	Newtown Jets	24	13	1	10	2	633	522	+111	31	Elimination Final
5	Canberra Raiders (R)	24	13	0	11	2	696	574	+122	30	Elimination Final
6	Penrith Panthers (R)	24	13	0	11	2	616	539	+77	30	
7	Sydney Roosters (R)	24	13	0	11	2	558	623	–65	30	
8	Canterbury-Bankstown Bulldogs (R)	24	10	2	12	2	690	647	+43	26	
9	Western Suburbs Magpies	24	9	1	14	2	544	716	-172	23	
10	North Sydney Bears	24	9	0	15	2	588	624	–36	22	
11	Manly Warringah Sea Eagles (R)	24	9	0	15	2	566	711	-145	22	
12	Newcastle Knights (R)	24	7	0	17	2	518	645	-127	18	
13	South Sydney Rabbitohs (R)	24	5	0	19	2	444	780	-338	14	

Updated to match(es) played on 1 September. Source:
Rules for classification: 1) points; 2) point difference; 3) points scored

===== Ladder progression =====
- Numbers highlighted in green indicate that the team finished the round inside the top 5.
- Numbers highlighted in blue indicates the team finished first on the ladder in that round.
- Numbers highlighted in red indicates the team finished last place on the ladder in that round.
- Underlined numbers indicate that the team had a bye during that round.

Pos	Team	1	2	3	4	5	6	7	8	9	10	11	12	13	14	15	16	17	18	19	20	21	22	23	24	25	26
1	New Zealand Warriors (R)	2	4	6	8	10	10	12	14	16	18	20	22	24	26	28	30	32	34	36	38	40	41	43	43	45	47
2	St George Illawarra Dragons (R)	2	4	6	6	7	9	9	11	13	15	17	19	21	23	25	27	27	29	31	33	33	34	34	34	36	36
3	Parramatta Eels (R)	2	4	6	6	7	9	11	13	15	15	17	19	19	21	21	23	25	25	27	27	29	31	33	35	35	35
4	Newtown Jets	2	4	6	8	8	10	12	14	14	14	14	16	16	16	18	20	22	24	26	26	28	29	29	29	31	31
5	Canberra Raiders (R)	0	2	2	2	4	4	6	8	10	10	12	12	12	12	12	12	14	14	16	18	20	22	24	26	28	30
6	Penrith Panthers (R)	0	2	4	6	6	8	10	10	10	12	14	14	16	18	18	18	20	22	22	24	24	26	28	30	30	30
7	Sydney Roosters (R)	2	2	2	4	6	6	6	8	10	12	12	12	14	14	16	18	18	20	20	22	22	24	26	28	28	30
8	Canterbury-Bankstown Bulldogs (R)	0	2	2	2	4	6	8	10	10	12	12	12	14	15	15	17	17	17	17	19	21	22	22	22	24	26
9	Western Suburbs Magpies	0	0	2	2	2	4	4	4	4	4	6	8	10	11	13	13	15	17	17	17	19	19	21	23	23	23
10	North Sydney Bears	0	0	0	2	4	6	8	8	8	10	10	10	12	12	14	14	16	16	18	18	18	20	20	20	20	22
11	Manly Warringah Sea Eagles (R)	0	0	2	4	6	6	6	6	8	8	10	10	10	12	12	12	12	12	12	12	14	14	16	18	20	22
12	Newcastle Knights (R)	2	2	2	4	4	4	4	4	6	6	6	8	8	8	8	8	8	10	12	14	14	14	14	16	18	18
13	South Sydney Rabbitohs (R)	2	2	2	2	2	2	2	2	2	4	4	6	6	8	10	12	12	12	12	12	12	12	12	12	12	14

Season Results:

Home	Score	Away	Match Information
Home	Score	Away	Date and Time	Venue	Referee	Video
Round 1
Penrith Panthers (R)	12 – 26	Newtown Jets	Saturday, 8 March, 2:00pm	Parker Street Reserve	Jake Sutherland
Canberra Raiders (R)	16 – 18	New Zealand Warriors (R)	Saturday, 8 March, 2:00pm	Leichhardt Oval	Chris Sutton
Western Suburbs Magpies	10 – 36	Newcastle Knights (R)	Saturday, 8 March, 2:15pm	Lidcombe Oval	Michael Ford
St George Illawarra Dragons (R)	34 – 26	Canterbury-Bankstown Bulldogs (R)	Saturday, 8 March, 3:05pm	Jubilee Stadium	Damian Brady
Manly Warringah Sea Eagles (R)	20 – 22	South Sydney Rabbitohs (R)	Saturday, 8 March, 5:15pm	4 Pines Park	Daniel Luttringer
Sydney Roosters (R)	12 – 10	North Sydney Bears	Sunday, 9 March, 3:00pm	Wentworth Park	Luke Saldern
Parramatta Eels (R)		BYE
Round 2
New Zealand Warriors (R)	31 – 20	Manly Warringah Sea Eagles (R)	Friday, 14 March, 5:15pm	Go Media Stadium	Paki Parkinson
St George Illawarra Dragons (R)	30 – 18	South Sydney Rabbitohs (R)	Saturday, 15 March, 12:40pm	WIN Stadium	Daniel Luttringer
Penrith Panthers (R)	38 – 10	Sydney Roosters (R)	Saturday, 15 March, 2:00pm	Parker Street Reserve	Jake Sutherland
Newtown Jets	23 – 22	Newcastle Knights (R)	Saturday, 15 March, 3:00pm	Henson Park	Chris Sutton
Parramatta Eels (R)	20 – 10	Western Suburbs Magpies	Sunday, 16 March, 1:00pm	Ringrose Park	Michael Ford
Canterbury-Bankstown Bulldogs (R)	46 – 28	North Sydney Bears	Sunday, 16 March, 3:55pm	Belmore Sports Ground	Luke Saldern
Canberra Raiders (R)		BYE
Round 3
New Zealand Warriors (R)	46 – 12	Sydney Roosters (R)	Friday, 21 March, 5:15pm	Go Media Stadium	Paki Parkinson
Newtown Jets	40 – 10	South Sydney Rabbitohs (R)	Saturday, 22 March, 12:40pm	Sharks Stadium	Damian Brady
Western Suburbs Magpies	32 – 24	North Sydney Bears	Saturday, 22 March, 2:00pm	Lidcombe Oval	Kasey Badger
Newcastle Knights (R)	12 – 26	Penrith Panthers (R)	Saturday, 22 March, 4:15pm	Lakeside Sporting Complex	Daniel Luttringer
Parramatta Eels (R)	23 – 16	Canterbury-Bankstown Bulldogs (R)	Sunday, 23 March, 1:30pm	CommBank Stadium	Michael Ford
Manly Warringah Sea Eagles (R)	28 – 26	Canberra Raiders (R)	Sunday, 23 March, 3:50pm	4 Pines Park	Kieren Irons
St George Illawarra Dragons (R)		BYE
Round 4
St George Illawarra Dragons (R)	24 – 28	North Sydney Bears	Saturday, 29 March, 12:40pm	Jubilee Stadium	Daniel Luttringer
Newtown Jets	28 – 18	Canterbury-Bankstown Bulldogs (R)	Saturday, 29 March, 3:00pm	Henson Park	Jake Sutherland
South Sydney Rabbitohs (R)	22 – 26	Penrith Panthers (R)	Saturday, 29 March, 3:00pm	Redfern Oval	Ziggy Przeklasa-Adamski
Canberra Raiders (R)	26 – 34	Sydney Roosters (R)	Saturday, 29 March, 3:30pm	Raiders Belconnen	Luke Saldern
Manly Warringah Sea Eagles (R)	32 – 22	Parramatta Eels (R)	Sunday, 30 March, 1:45pm	4 Pines Park	Mitchell Currie
Western Suburbs Magpies	20 – 34	New Zealand Warriors (R)	Sunday, 30 March, 3:55pm	Campbelltown Sports Stadium	Kasey Badger
Newcastle Knights (R)		BYE
Round 5
Penrith Panthers (R)	24 – 26	North Sydney Bears	Saturday, 5 April, 12:00pm	Parker Street Reserve	Luke Saldern
Parramatta Eels (R)	28 – 28	St George Illawarra Dragons (R)	Saturday, 5 April, 12:40pm	CommBank Stadium	Kieren Irons
Canberra Raiders (R)	42 – 14	Newtown Jets	Saturday, 5 April, 3:00pm	Raiders Belconnen	Jake Sutherland
Manly Warringah Sea Eagles (R)	52 – 26	Western Suburbs Magpies	Sunday, 6 April, 1:50pm	4 Pines Park	Damian Brady
South Sydney Rabbitohs (R)	10 – 24	Sydney Roosters (R)	Sunday, 6 April, 3:00pm	Redfern Oval	Ziggy Przeklasa-Adamski
Canterbury-Bankstown Bulldogs (R)	26 – 24	Newcastle Knights (R)	Sunday, 6 April, 3:55pm	Accor Stadium	Mitchell Currie
New Zealand Warriors (R)		BYE
Round 6
Manly Warringah Sea Eagles (R)	0 – 56	Penrith Panthers (R)	Friday, 11 April, 8:00pm	Parker Street Reserve	Mitchell Currie
New Zealand Warriors (R)	20 – 28	Newtown Jets	Saturday, 12 April, 11:00am	Waitakere Stadium	Luke Saldern
St George Illawarra Dragons (R)	44 – 12	Sydney Roosters (R)	Saturday, 12 April, 1:00pm	Collegians Sporting Complex	Damian Brady
Parramatta Eels (R)	28 – 20	Canberra Raiders (R)	Saturday, 12 April, 5:00pm	Lidcombe Oval	Kasey Badger
Newcastle Knights (R)	24 – 40	Western Suburbs Magpies	Sunday, 13 April, 1:40pm	McDonald Jones Stadium	Jake Sutherland
North Sydney Bears	30 – 12	South Sydney Rabbitohs (R)	Sunday, 13 April, 3:00pm	Industree Group Stadium	Daniel Luttringer
Canterbury-Bankstown Bulldogs (R)		BYE
Round 7 (Easter Round)
Canterbury-Bankstown Bulldogs (R)	62 – 18	South Sydney Rabbitohs (R)	Friday, 18 April, 1:45pm	Accor Stadium	Tom Stindl
Sydney Roosters (R)	6 – 32	Penrith Panthers (R)	Friday, 18 April, 2:30pm	Mascot Oval	Ziggy Przeklasa-Adamski
New Zealand Warriors (R)	40 – 12	St George Illawarra Dragons (R)	Saturday, 19 April, 5:05pm	Go Media Stadium	Mitchell Currie
Newcastle Knights (R)	12 – 40	Newtown Jets	Sunday, 20 April, 1:40pm	McDonald Jones Stadium	Damian Brady
Canberra Raiders (R)	46 – 12	Manly Warringah Sea Eagles (R)	Sunday, 20 April, 3:00pm	Raiders Belconnen	Chris Sutton
Western Suburbs Magpies	10 – 22	Parramatta Eels (R)	Monday, 21 April, 12:00pm	Lidcombe Oval	Kieren Irons
North Sydney Bears		BYE
Round 8 (ANZAC Round)
St George Illawarra Dragons (R)	36 – 6	Manly Warringah Sea Eagles (R)	Saturday, 26 April, 1:00pm	Collegians Sporting Complex	Damian Brady
New Zealand Warriors (R)	30 – 18	Newcastle Knights (R)	Saturday, 26 April, 2:00pm	Waitakere Stadium	Tom Stindl
South Sydney Rabbitohs (R)	20 – 50	Parramatta Eels (R)	Saturday, 26 April, 2:00pm	Redfern Oval	Dillan Wells
Western Suburbs Magpies	6 – 18	Newtown Jets	Saturday, 26 April, 2:00pm	Lidcombe Oval	Mitchell Currie
Canterbury-Bankstown Bulldogs (R)	34 – 18	Penrith Panthers (R)	Saturday, 26 April, 3:00pm	Belmore Sports Ground	Jake Sutherland
Canberra Raiders (R)	36 – 26	North Sydney Bears	Sunday, 27 April, 4:15pm	GIO Stadium	Ziggy Przeklasa-Adamski
Sydney Roosters (R)		BYE
Round 9
Newtown Jets	18 – 28	Parramatta Eels (R)	Saturday, 3 May, 3:00pm	Henson Park	Daniel Luttringer
North Sydney Bears	14 – 56	New Zealand Warriors (R)	Sunday, 4 May, 1:00pm	North Sydney Oval	Luke Saldern
South Sydney Rabbitohs (R)	24 – 26	Newcastle Knights (R)	Sunday, 4 May, 1:00pm	Redfern Oval	Clayton Wills
Penrith Panthers (R)	10 – 16	Canberra Raiders (R)	Sunday, 4 May, 2:15pm	Blacktown International Sports Park	Damian Brady
Western Suburbs Magpies	26 – 60	St George Illawarra Dragons (R)	Sunday, 4 May, 2:15pm	Lidcombe Oval	Dillan Wells
Sydney Roosters (R)	38 – 31	Canterbury-Bankstown Bulldogs (R)	Sunday, 4 May, 3:00pm	Wentworth Park	Tom Stindl
Manly Warringah Sea Eagles (R)		BYE
Round 10 (Regional Magic Round)
Penrith Panthers (R)	40 – 16	Western Suburbs Magpies	Saturday, 10 May, 11:00am	Scully Park	Tom Stindl
New Zealand Warriors (R)	46 – 30	Canberra Raiders (R)	Saturday, 10 May, 2:00pm	Collegians Sporting Complex	Kasey Badger
Newcastle Knights (R)	24 – 26	North Sydney Bears	Saturday, 10 May, 3:00pm	Scully Park	Dillan Wells
Newtown Jets	4 – 34	St George Illawarra Dragons (R)	Sunday, 11 May, 11:00am	Scully Park	Damian Brady
Manly Warringah Sea Eagles (R)	20 – 36	Sydney Roosters (R)	Sunday, 11 May, 1:00pm	Scully Park	Daniel Luttringer
Parramatta Eels (R)	28 – 41	Canterbury-Bankstown Bulldogs (R)	Sunday, 11 May, 3:00pm	Scully Park	Clayton Wills
South Sydney Rabbitohs (R)		BYE
Round 11
Newcastle Knights (R)	10 – 30	Parramatta Eels (R)	Friday, 16 May, 3:30pm	McDonald Jones Stadium	Chris Sutton
Manly Warringah Sea Eagles (R)	18 – 16	Canterbury-Bankstown Bulldogs (R)	Saturday, 17 May, 2:00pm	4 Pines Park	Clayton Wills
Newtown Jets	18 – 30	Canberra Raiders (R)	Saturday, 17 May, 3:00pm	Henson Park	Mitchell Currie
Sydney Roosters (R)	14 – 24	New Zealand Warriors (R)	Sunday, 18 May, 1:00pm	Wentworth Park	Ziggy Przeklasa-Adamski
North Sydney Bears	18 – 28	St George Illawarra Dragons (R)	Sunday, 18 May, 3:00pm	North Sydney Oval	Luke Saldern
Western Suburbs Magpies	24 – 6	South Sydney Rabbitohs (R)	Sunday, 18 May, 3:55pm	Campbelltown Sports Stadium	Damian Brady
Penrith Panthers (R)		BYE
Round 12
Parramatta Eels (R)	36 – 26	Manly Warringah Sea Eagles (R)	Saturday, 24 May, 11:30am	Kellyville Park	Kasey Badger
South Sydney Rabbitohs (R)	18 – 2	North Sydney Bears	Saturday, 24 May, 2:00pm	Redfern Oval	Clayton Wills
Sydney Roosters (R)	0 – 54	Newtown Jets	Saturday, 24 May, 5:05pm	Industree Group Stadium	Chris Sutton
Penrith Panthers (R)	16 – 36	Newcastle Knights (R)	Sunday, 25 May, 2:00pm	Blacktown International Sports Park	Damian Brady
Canberra Raiders (R)	28 – 36	St George Illawarra Dragons (R)	Sunday, 25 May, 3:00pm	Seiffert Oval	Kieren Irons
New Zealand Warriors (R)	40 – 24	Canterbury-Bankstown Bulldogs (R)	Sunday, 25 May, 3:20pm	Go Media Stadium	Daniel Luttringer
Western Suburbs Magpies		BYE
Round 13
St George Illawarra Dragons (R)	28 – 24	Newcastle Knights (R)	Friday, 30 May, 5:40pm	Jubilee Stadium	Mitchell Currie
South Sydney Rabbitohs (R)	6 – 24	New Zealand Warriors (R)	Saturday, 31 May, 1:30pm	Redfern Oval	Ethan Klein
Newtown Jets	22 – 32	Western Suburbs Magpies	Saturday, 31 May, 3:00pm	Henson Park	Dillan Wells
Manly Warringah Sea Eagles (R)	20 – 24	North Sydney Bears	Saturday, 31 May, 5:15pm	4 Pines Park	Luke Saldern
Penrith Panthers (R)	42 – 28	Parramatta Eels (R)	Sunday, 1 June, 1:45pm	CommBank Stadium	Daniel Luttringer
Sydney Roosters (R)	48 – 24	Canberra Raiders (R)	Sunday, 1 June, 2:00pm	Wentworth Park	Clayton Wills
Canterbury-Bankstown Bulldogs (R)		BYE
Round 14
Newcastle Knights (R)	24 – 48	Manly Warringah Sea Eagles (R)	Thursday, 5 June, 5:20pm	McDonald Jones Stadium	Liam Kennedy
Newtown Jets	16 – 22	New Zealand Warriors (R)	Saturday, 7 June, 3:00pm	Henson Park	Damian Brady
Parramatta Eels (R)	28 – 16	Sydney Roosters (R)	Sunday, 8 June, 3:00pm	Kellyville Park	Dillan Wells
Canberra Raiders (R)	14 – 24	South Sydney Rabbitohs (R)	Sunday, 8 June, 4:15pm	GIO Stadium	Ethan Klein
North Sydney Bears	16 – 26	Penrith Panthers (R)	Sunday, 8 June, 5:00pm	North Sydney Oval	Clayton Wills
Canterbury-Bankstown Bulldogs (R)	34 – 34	Western Suburbs Magpies	Monday, 9 June, 1:40pm	Accor Stadium	Daniel Luttringer
St George Illawarra Dragons (R)		BYE
Round 15
St George Illawarra Dragons (R)	38 – 6	Penrith Panthers (R)	Saturday, 14 June, 1:00pm	Collegians Sporting Complex	Daniel Luttringer
Parramatta Eels (R)	22 – 46	New Zealand Warriors (R)	Saturday, 14 June, 1:00pm	Kellyville Park	Clayton Wills
Western Suburbs Magpies	32 – 10	Manly Warringah Sea Eagles (R)	Saturday, 14 June, 2:15pm	Lidcombe Oval	Ethan Klein
Newcastle Knights (R)	6 – 28	Sydney Roosters (R)	Saturday, 14 June, 3:05pm	McDonald Jones Stadium	Luke Saldern
South Sydney Rabbitohs (R)	36 – 22	Canterbury-Bankstown Bulldogs (R)	Sunday, 15 June, 1:45pm	Accor Stadium	Damian Brady
North Sydney Bears	34 – 28	Canberra Raiders (R)	Sunday, 15 June, 3:00pm	North Sydney Oval	Kieren Irons
Newtown Jets		BYE
Round 16
St George Illawarra Dragons (R)	38 – 18	Western Suburbs Magpies	Saturday, 21 June, 1:00pm	Collegians Sporting Complex	Damian Brady
New Zealand Warriors (R)	32 – 12	Penrith Panthers (R)	Saturday, 21 June, 2:40pm	Go Media Stadium	Paki Parkinson
Canterbury-Bankstown Bulldogs (R)	30 – 18	Canberra Raiders (R)	Saturday, 21 June, 4:00pm	Belmore Sports Ground	Jake Sutherland
South Sydney Rabbitohs (R)	24 – 22	Manly Warringah Sea Eagles (R)	Saturday, 21 June, 5:15pm	Accor Stadium	Dillan Wells
North Sydney Bears	12 – 24	Newtown Jets	Sunday, 22 June, 3:00pm	North Sydney Oval	Kasey Badger
Parramatta Eels (R)	28 – 24	Newcastle Knights (R)	Sunday, 22 June, 3:45pm	CommBank Stadium	Luke Saldern
Sydney Roosters (R)		BYE
Round 17
Penrith Panthers (R)	36 – 6	Canterbury-Bankstown Bulldogs (R)	Friday, 27 June, 4:30pm	Parker Street Reserve	Clayton Wills
Newcastle Knights (R)	26 – 40	Canberra Raiders (R)	Friday, 27 June, 5:30pm	McDonald Jones Stadium	Mitchell Currie
Western Suburbs Magpies	28 – 14	Sydney Roosters (R)	Saturday, 28 June, 2:15pm	Lidcombe Oval	Damian Brady
Manly Warringah Sea Eagles (R)	4 – 26	New Zealand Warriors (R)	Saturday, 28 June, 3:00pm	4 Pines Park	Luke Saldern
St George Illawarra Dragons (R)	22 – 36	Parramatta Eels (R)	Saturday, 28 June, 3:10pm	WIN Stadium	Daniel Luttringer
South Sydney Rabbitohs (R)	18 – 42	Newtown Jets	Sunday, 29 June, 3:00pm	Coogee Oval	Chris Sutton
North Sydney Bears		BYE
Round 18 (First Nations Round)
Penrith Panthers (R)	30 – 26	South Sydney Rabbitohs (R)	Friday, 4 June, 7:00pm	Parker Street Reserve	Kieren Irons
Canberra Raiders (R)	18 – 22	Western Suburbs Magpies	Saturday, 5 July, 12:30pm	GIO Stadium	Daniel Luttringer
Newcastle Knights (R)	26 – 18	Canterbury-Bankstown Bulldogs (R)	Saturday, 5 July, 2:15pm	Newcastle Centre of Excellence	Luke Saldern
Newtown Jets	36 – 22	North Sydney Bears	Saturday, 5 July, 3:00pm	Henson Park	Dillan Wells
Sydney Roosters (R)	38 – 18	Parramatta Eels (R)	Sunday, 6 July, 11:00am	Wentworth Park	Damian Brady
Manly Warringah Sea Eagles (R)	22 – 30	St George Illawarra Dragons (R)	Sunday, 6 July, 1:45pm	4 Pines Park	Clayton Wills
New Zealand Warriors (R)		BYE
Round 19
Newcastle Knights (R)	36 – 24	South Sydney Rabbitohs (R)	Saturday, 12 July, 12:30pm	McDonald Jones Stadium	Martin Jones
Newtown Jets	26 – 24	Manly Warringah Sea Eagles (R)	Saturday, 12 July, 3:00pm	Henson Park	Clayton Wills
New Zealand Warriors (R)	22 – 14	Western Suburbs Magpies	Sunday, 13 July, 11:40am	Go Media Stadium	Luke Saldern
Parramatta Eels (R)	26 – 20	Penrith Panthers (R)	Sunday, 13 July, 1:30pm	CommBank Stadium	Mitchell Currie
North Sydney Bears	50 – 0	Canterbury-Bankstown Bulldogs (R)	Sunday, 13 July, 3:00pm	North Sydney Oval	Ethan Klein
Sydney Roosters (R)	18 – 28	St George Illawarra Dragons (R)	Sunday, 13 July, 3:00pm	Wentworth Park	Dillan Wells
Canberra Raiders (R)		BYE
Round 20
New Zealand Warriors (R)	32 – 18	North Sydney Bears	Saturday, 19 July, 12:00pm	North Harbour Stadium	Paki Parkinson
Canterbury-Bankstown Bulldogs (R)	58 – 20	Manly Warringah Sea Eagles (R)	Saturday, 19 July, 1:15pm	Belmore Sports Ground	Martin Jones
South Sydney Rabbitohs (R)	22 – 32	St George Illawarra Dragons (R)	Saturday, 19 July, 2:00pm	Redfern Oval	Billy Greatbatch
Western Suburbs Magpies	24 – 28	Penrith Panthers (R)	Saturday, 19 July, 2:15pm	Lidcombe Oval	Jake Sutherland
Newtown Jets	24 – 26	Sydney Roosters (R)	Saturday, 19 July, 3:00pm	Henson Park	Damian Brady
Canberra Raiders (R)	22 – 16	Parramatta Eels (R)	Saturday, 19 July, 5:15pm	GIO Stadium	Michael Ford
Newcastle Knights (R)		BYE
Round 21
North Sydney Bears	22 – 24	Western Suburbs Magpies	Friday, 25 July, 6:00pm	North Sydney Oval	Daniel Luttringer
New Zealand Warriors (R)	68 – 6	South Sydney Rabbitohs (R)	Saturday, 26 July, 12:35pm	Go Media Stadium	Martin Jones
Penrith Panthers (R)	34 – 40	Manly Warringah Sea Eagles (R)	Saturday, 26 July, 3:00pm	CommBank Stadium	Ethan Klein
Newtown Jets	40 – 16	St George Illawarra Dragons (R)	Saturday, 26 July, 3:30pm	Henson Park	Jake Sutherland
Canberra Raiders (R)	28 – 16	Newcastle Knights (R)	Sunday, 27 July, 11:40am	GIO Stadium	Billy Greatbatch
Canterbury-Bankstown Bulldogs (R)	26 – 24	Sydney Roosters (R)	Sunday, 27 July, 12:00pm	Belmore Sports Ground	Damian Brady
Parramatta Eels (R)		BYE
Round 22
Western Suburbs Magpies	18 – 58	Canberra Raiders (R)	Saturday, 2 August, 2:15pm	Lidcombe Oval	Tom Stindl
Parramatta Eels (R)	52 – 4	South Sydney Rabbitohs (R)	Saturday, 2 August, 3:00pm	Kellyville Park	Billy Greatbatch
St George Illawarra Dragons (R)	14 – 14	New Zealand Warriors (R)	Saturday, 2 August, 3:10pm	WIN Stadium	Daniel Luttringer
Manly Warringah Sea Eagles (R)	12 – 20	Sydney Roosters (R)	Saturday, 2 August, 5:15pm	4 Pines Park	Luke Saldern
Canterbury-Bankstown Bulldogs (R)	18 – 18	Newtown Jets	Sunday, 3 August, 1:40pm	Sharks Stadium	Chris Butler
North Sydney Bears	26 – 18	Newcastle Knights (R)	Sunday, 3 August, 3:00pm	North Sydney Oval	Ethan Klein
Penrith Panthers (R)		BYE
Round 23
St George Illawarra Dragons (R)	14 – 32	Canberra Raiders (R)	Saturday, 9 August, 1:00pm	Collegians Sporting Complex	Tom Stindl
Canterbury-Bankstown Bulldogs (R)	30 – 34	New Zealand Warriors (R)	Saturday, 9 August, 1:30pm	Leichhardt Oval	Ethan Klein
Manly Warringah Sea Eagles (R)	30 – 12	Newcastle Knights (R)	Saturday, 9 August, 2:00pm	4 Pines Park	Billy Greatbatch
Newtown Jets	16 – 26	Penrith Panthers (R)	Saturday, 9 August, 3:00pm	Henson Park	Dillan Wells
Parramatta Eels (R)	32 – 30	North Sydney Bears	Sunday, 10 August, 12:00pm	Kellyville Park	Luke Saldern
Sydney Roosters (R)	26 – 24	South Sydney Rabbitohs (R)	Sunday, 10 August, 2:15pm	Wentworth Park	Daniel Luttringer
Western Suburbs Magpies		BYE
Round 24
Penrith Panthers (R)	20 – 18	New Zealand Warriors (R)	Saturday, 16 August, 1:00pm	St Marys Leagues Stadium	Mitchell Currie
South Sydney Rabbitohs (R)	24 – 42	Western Suburbs Magpies	Saturday, 16 August, 2:00pm	Redfern Oval	Luke Saldern
Parramatta Eels (R)	30 – 28	Newtown Jets	Saturday, 16 August, 3:00pm	Kellyville Park	Daniel Luttringer
Canberra Raiders (R)	26 – 22	Canterbury-Bankstown Bulldogs (R)	Saturday, 16 August, 3:00pm	Raiders Belconnen	Tom Stindl
Newcastle Knights (R)	22 – 6	St George Illawarra Dragons (R)	Saturday, 16 August, 3:15pm	Newcastle Centre of Excellence	Ethan Klein
North Sydney Bears	24 – 28	Sydney Roosters (R)	Sunday, 17 August, 3:00pm	North Sydney Oval	Billy Greatbatch
Manly Warringah Sea Eagles (R)		BYE
Round 25
New Zealand Warriors (R)	54 – 4	Parramatta Eels (R)	Saturday, 23 August, 12:00pm	Waitakere Stadium	Jake Sutherland
Penrith Panthers (R)	30 – 31	St George Illawarra Dragons (R)	Saturday, 23 August, 2:00pm	St Marys Leagues Stadium	Kieren Irons
Western Suburbs Magpies	18 – 40	Canterbury-Bankstown Bulldogs (R)	Saturday, 23 August, 2:15pm	Lidcombe Oval	Martin Jones
South Sydney Rabbitohs (R)	26 – 38	Canberra Raiders (R)	Saturday, 23 August, 3:00pm	Redfern Oval	Billy Greatbatch
Sydney Roosters (R)	24 – 28	Newcastle Knights (R)	Sunday, 24 August, 2:30pm	Wentworth Park	Damian Brady
North Sydney Bears	18 – 38	Manly Warringah Sea Eagles (R)	Sunday, 24 August, 3:00pm	North Sydney Oval	Daniel Luttringer
Newtown Jets		BYE
Round 26
Newcastle Knights (R)	12 – 20	New Zealand Warriors (R)	Saturday, 30 August, 1:30pm	Newcastle Centre of Excellence	Billy Greatbatch
Canberra Raiders (R)	34 – 8	Penrith Panthers (R)	Saturday, 30 August, 5:30pm	GIO Stadium	Damian Brady
Canterbury-Bankstown Bulldogs (R)	46 – 10	St George Illawarra Dragons (R)	Saturday, 30 August, 6:45pm	McCredie Park	Louis Matheson
North Sydney Bears	54 – 6	Parramatta Eels (R)	Saturday, 30 August, 7:30pm	North Sydney Oval	Martin Jones
Manly Warringah Sea Eagles (R)	42 – 30	Newtown Jets	Sunday, 31 August, 2:00pm	4 Pines Park	Daniel Luttringer
Sydney Roosters (R)	50 – 18	Western Suburbs Magpies	Sunday, 31 August, 2:30pm	Wentworth Park	Jake Sutherland
South Sydney Rabbitohs (R)		BYE
Finals Series
Qualifying & Elimination Finals
Newtown Jets	20 – 24	Canberra Raiders (R)	Saturday, 6 September, 2:00pm	Jubilee Stadium	Daniel Luttringer
St George Illawarra Dragons (R)	24 – 18	Parramatta Eels (R)	Saturday, 6 September, 6:00pm	Jubilee Stadium	Damian Brady
Major & Minor Semi-Finals
New Zealand Warriors (R)	10 – 24	St George Illawarra Dragons (R)	Sunday, 14 September, 1:00pm	Leichhardt Oval	Damian Brady
Parramatta Eels (R)	36 – 30	Canberra Raiders (R)	Sunday, 14 September, 5:00pm	Leichhardt Oval	Daniel Luttringer
Preliminary Final
New Zealand Warriors (R)	42 – 14	Parramatta Eels (R)	Saturday, 20 September, 5:15pm	Jubilee Stadium	Damian Brady
Grand Final
St George Illawarra Dragons (R)	V	New Zealand Warriors (R)	Sunday, 28 September, 3:15pm	CommBank Stadium	TBA

==== Grand Final ====
Qualifying & Elimination Finals
2	St George Illawarra	24
3	Parramatta	18
4	Newtown	20
5	Canberra	24

Major Semi-Final
1	New Zealand	10
2	St George Illawarra	24
Minor Semi-Final
3	Parramatta	36
5	Canberra	30

Preliminary Final
1	New Zealand	42
3	Parramatta	14

Grand Final
2	St George Illawarra	12
1	New Zealand	30

2025 New South Wales Cup Grand Final

Sunday, 28 September 2025
3:15pm

St George Illawarra Dragons (R)	12–30	New Zealand Warriors (R)
Tries: Buchanan 15'; Finau 44'; Goals: Glover 2/2 16', 46'; Sin bin: Ilias (yellow card) 48' to 58'	1st: 6–16; 2nd: 6–14; Report	Tries: Graham-Taufa 11'; Tu 31', 52'; Healey 34'; Ieremia-Toeava 52'; Goals: Boyd 5/6 32', 35', 48 pen.', 54', 60'

CommBank Stadium, Sydney

=== New South Wales Women's Premiership ===
The New South Wales Women's Premiership (named the Harvey Norman Women's Premiership for sponsorship reasons) is the premier women's Rugby League competition in New South Wales. Nationally, Along with the QRL Women's Premiership, the New South Wales Women's Premiership is a Tier 2 competition and feeds into the Tier 1 National Rugby League Women's Premiership.

==== Teams ====
There will be 12 teams in the 2025 competition, the same number as 2024.

The competition features 5 reserve teams from the NRLW competition, 5 standalone clubs who have feeder arrangements with NRLW teams and 2 standalone clubs.

Canterbury-Bankstown were accepted into the NRLW for the 2025 season meaning their women's premiership team will act as a reserves team.

Penrith announced they were joining the Women's Premiership for 2025 as a pathway towards future inclusion into the NRLW competition.

Manly Warringah pulled out of the 2025 competition.

Colours	Club	NRLW Affiliate	Home ground(s)	Head coach
	Canterbury-Bankstown Bulldogs (WR)		Belmore Sports Ground	TBA
	Central Coast Roosters (W)	Sydney Roosters	Woy Woy Oval	TBA
	Cronulla-Sutherland Sharks (WR)		Sharks Stadium	TBA
	Illawarra Steelers (W)	St George Illawarra Dragons	Collegians Sporting Complex	TBA
	Mount Pritchard Mounties (W)	Canberra Raiders	Aubrey Keech Reserve	Sa Patiole
	Newcastle Knights (WR)		McDonald Jones Stadium, Newcastle Centre of Excellence	TBA
	Parramatta Eels (WR)		Eric Tweedale Stadium	TBA
	Penrith Panthers (W)	N/A	St Marys Leagues Stadium	Karen Stuart
	South Sydney Rabbitohs (W)	N/A	Redfern Oval	TBA
	St George Dragons (W)	St George Illawarra Dragons	Netstrada Jubilee Stadium	TBA
	Wentworthville Magpies (W)	Parramatta Eels	Ringrose Park	TBA
	Wests Tigers (WR)		Lidcombe Oval	TBA

State Map	Sydney Venues
Home Venues	Home Venues

==== Ladder ====
Pos	Team	Pld	W	D	L	B	PF	PA	PD	Pts	Qualification
1	Newcastle Knights (WR)	11	10	0	1	0	274	106	+168	20	Minor Premiers & Semi-Finals
2	Mount Pritchard Mounties (W)	11	8	0	3	0	288	158	+130	16	Semi-Finals
3	Cronulla-Sutherland Sharks (WR)	11	8	0	3	0	282	190	+92	16	Semi-Finals
4	Illawarra Steelers (W)	11	8	0	3	0	228	160	+68	16	Semi-Finals
5	Parramatta Eels (WR)	11	8	0	3	0	228	168	+60	16	
6	South Sydney Rabbitohs (W)	11	5	1	5	0	190	222	–32	11	
7	Canterbury-Bankstown Bulldogs (WR)	11	5	0	6	0	192	206	–14	10	
8	Wests Tigers (WR)	11	5	0	6	0	186	242	–56	10	
9	Penrith Panthers (W)	11	3	2	6	0	158	226	–68	8	
10	Central Coast Roosters (W)	11	3	0	8	0	174	232	–58	6	
11	Wentworthville Magpies (W)	11	1	1	9	0	161	298	-137	3	
12	St George Dragons (W)	11	0	0	11	0	112	265	-153	0	

Updated to match(es) played on 15 September. Source:
Rules for classification: 1) points; 2) point difference; 3) points scored

===== Ladder progression =====
- Numbers highlighted in green indicate that the team finished the round inside the top 4.
- Numbers highlighted in blue indicates the team finished first on the ladder in that round.
- Numbers highlighted in red indicates the team finished last place on the ladder in that round.

Pos	Team	1	2	3	4	5	6	7	8	9	10	11
1	Newcastle Knights (WR)	2	4	6	6	8	10	12	14	16	18	20
2	Mount Pritchard Mounties (W)	2	4	4	6	6	8	8	10	12	14	16
3	Cronulla-Sutherland Sharks (WR)	2	2	4	6	8	10	12	14	14	14	16
4	Illawarra Steelers (W)	2	4	6	8	10	10	12	12	12	14	16
5	Parramatta Eels (WR)	0	0	2	4	6	8	10	12	14	16	16
6	South Sydney Rabbitohs (W)	2	3	3	5	7	9	9	9	11	11	11
7	Canterbury-Bankstown Bulldogs (WR)	0	2	4	6	6	8	8	8	8	10	10
8	Wests Tigers (WR)	0	0	2	2	2	2	4	6	6	8	10
9	Penrith Panthers (W)	2	3	3	3	3	3	4	4	6	6	8
10	Central Coast Roosters (W)	0	2	2	2	4	4	4	4	6	6	6
11	Wentworthville Magpies (W)	0	0	0	0	0	0	1	3	3	3	3
12	St George Dragons (W)	0	0	0	0	0	0	0	0	0	0	0

Season Results:

Home	Score	Away	Match Information
Home	Score	Away	Date and Time	Venue	Referee	Video
Round 1 (First Nations Round)
Cronulla-Sutherland Sharks (WR)	26 – 18	Parramatta Eels (WR)	Thursday, 3 July, 5:30pm	Sharks Stadium	Balunn Simon
Canterbury-Bankstown Bulldogs (WR)	14 – 20	Newcastle Knights (WR)	Saturday, 5 July, 12:00pm	Belmore Sports Ground	Bailey Warren
Mount Pritchard Mounties (W)	30 – 16	St George Dragons (W)	Saturday, 5 July, 1:00pm	Aubrey Keech Reserve	Liam Richardson
Illawarra Steelers (W)	32 – 14	Wests Tigers (WR)	Saturday, 5 July, 3:00pm	Ziems Park	Ryan Micallef
Central Coast Roosters (W)	14 – 22	Penrith Panthers (W)	Sunday, 6 July, 12:15pm	Berkeley Vale Oval	Jake Walsh
Wentworthville Magpies (W)	20 – 22	South Sydney Rabbitohs (W)	Monday, 7 July, 7:00pm	NSWRL Centre of Excellence	Harrison Baysarri
Round 2
Wests Tigers (WR)	10 – 12	Canterbury-Bankstown Bulldogs (WR)	Saturday, 12 July, 12:00pm	Lidcombe Oval	Jake Walsh
Mount Pritchard Mounties (W)	46 – 22	Cronulla-Sutherland Sharks (WR)	Saturday, 12 July, 2:20pm	GIO Stadium	Aidan Richardson
Illawarra Steelers (W)	22 – 12	Parramatta Eels (WR)	Saturday, 12 July, 3:00pm	Ziems Park	Matt Galvin
Wentworthville Magpies (W)	6 – 40	Newcastle Knights (WR)	Sunday, 13 July, 11:15am	Ringrose Park	Jayden Kastelan
St George Dragons (W)	12 – 22	Central Coast Roosters (W)	Sunday, 13 July, 12:00pm	Jubilee Stadium	Bailey Warren
Penrith Panthers (W)	22 – 22	South Sydney Rabbitohs (W)	Sunday, 13 July, 3:00pm	Blacktown International Sports Park	Jabril Daizli
Round 3
Wests Tigers (WR)	34 – 14	Wentworthville Magpies (W)	Saturday, 19 July, 10:00am	Lidcombe Oval	Liam O'Brien
Newcastle Knights (WR)	38 – 12	South Sydney Rabbitohs (W)	Saturday, 19 July, 11:30am	Cessnock Sportsground	Brayden Silvester
Illawarra Steelers (W)	28 – 6	Central Coast Roosters (W)	Saturday, 19 July, 3:00pm	Ziems Park	Balunn Simon
Cronulla-Sutherland Sharks (WR)	32 – 10	Penrith Panthers (W)	Saturday, 19 July, 3:00pm	Sharks Stadium	Jayden Kastelan
Mount Pritchard Mounties (W)	20 – 24	Parramatta Eels (WR)	Saturday, 19 July, 5:00pm	Aubrey Keech Reserve	Matthew Gomes
Canterbury-Bankstown Bulldogs (WR)	10 – 6	St George Dragons (W)	Monday, 21 July, 7:00pm	NSWRL Centre of Excellence	Bailey Clark
Round 4
Penrith Panthers (W)	6 – 16	Illawarra Steelers (W)	Friday, 25 July, 7:00pm	Blacktown International Sports Park	Salvatore Marigliano
Wentworthville Magpies (W)	6 – 28	Mount Pritchard Mounties (W)	Sunday, 27 July, 11:00am	Ringrose Park	Ryan Micallef
St George Dragons (W)	4 – 26	South Sydney Rabbitohs (W)	Sunday, 27 July, 11:45am	WIN Stadium	Liam Richardson
Central Coast Roosters (W)	18 – 30	Canterbury-Bankstown Bulldogs (WR)	Sunday, 27 July, 12:00pm	Woy Woy Oval	Jake Walsh
Parramatta Eels (WR)	16 – 12	Newcastle Knights (WR)	Sunday, 27 July, 2:30pm	Eric Tweedale Stadium	Matt Galvin
Cronulla-Sutherland Sharks (WR)	38 – 6	Wests Tigers (WR)	Monday, 28 July, 7:00pm	NSWRL Centre of Excellence	Jabril Daizli
Round 5
South Sydney Rabbitohs (W)	20 – 14	Canterbury-Bankstown Bulldogs (WR)	Saturday, 2 August, 10:30am	Redfern Oval	Matthew Gomes
Newcastle Knights (WR)	14 – 4	Mount Pritchard Mounties (W)	Saturday, 2 August, 3:00pm	Newcastle Centre of Excellence	Brayden Silvester
Wests Tigers (WR)	6 – 26	Central Coast Roosters (W)	Saturday, 2 August, 4:00pm	Lidcombe Oval	Stuart Halsey
Wentworthville Magpies (W)	12 – 26	Cronulla-Sutherland Sharks (WR)	Sunday, 3 August, 11:00am	Ringrose Park	Jayden Kastelan
Parramatta Eels (WR)	32 – 4	Penrith Panthers (W)	Sunday, 3 August, 12:00pm	Kellyville Park	Bailey Clark
St George Dragons (W)	6 – 26	Illawarra Steelers (W)	Tuesday, 5 August, 7:00pm	Jubilee Stadium	Balunn Simon
Round 6
South Sydney Rabbitohs (W)	26 – 18	Central Coast Roosters (W)	Saturday, 9 August, 10:30am	Redfern Oval	Balunn Simon
Newcastle Knights (WR)	26 – 6	Wests Tigers (WR)	Saturday, 9 August, 12:45pm	Newcastle Centre of Excellence	Brayden Silvester
Mount Pritchard Mounties (W)	20 – 0	Penrith Panthers (W)	Saturday, 9 August, 1:00pm	Aubrey Keech Reserve	Jabril Daizli
St George Dragons (W)	8 – 20	Cronulla-Sutherland Sharks (WR)	Sunday, 10 August, 10:30am	Jubilee Stadium	Liam O'Brien
Canterbury-Bankstown Bulldogs (WR)	26 – 0	Illawarra Steelers (W)	Sunday, 10 August, 12:15pm	Belmore Sports Ground	Matt Galvin
Parramatta Eels (WR)	20 – 18	Wentworthville Magpies (W)	Monday, 11 August, 7:00pm	Eric Tweedale Stadium	Bailey Clark
Round 7
South Sydney Rabbitohs (W)	8 – 26	Parramatta Eels (WR)	Saturday, 16 August, 11:30am	Redfern Oval	Bailey Clark
Wests Tigers (WR)	34 – 10	St George Dragons (W)	Saturday, 16 August, 12:00pm	Lidcombe Oval	Liam O'Brien
Mount Pritchard Mounties (W)	16 – 30	Illawarra Steelers (W)	Saturday, 16 August, 5:00pm	Aubrey Keech Reserve	Matt Galvin
Cronulla-Sutherland Sharks (WR)	48 – 16	Canterbury-Bankstown Bulldogs (WR)	Sunday, 17 August, 12:00pm	Sharks Stadium	Rami Abu-Mansour
Penrith Panthers (W)	22 – 22	Wentworthville Magpies (W)	Sunday, 17 August, 2:00pm	Blacktown International Sports Park	Liam Richardson
Newcastle Knights (WR)	20 – 0	Central Coast Roosters (W)	Monday, 18 August, 7:00pm	Newcastle Centre of Excellence	Callum Richardson
Round 8
Wests Tigers (WR)	18 – 10	Penrith Panthers (W)	Saturday, 23 August, 10:00am	Lidcombe Oval	Salvatore Marigliano
South Sydney Rabbitohs (W)	12 – 18	Cronulla-Sutherland Sharks (WR)	Saturday, 23 August, 10:30am	Redfern Oval	Harrison Baysarri
Newcastle Knights (WR)	28 – 10	Illawarra Steelers (W)	Saturday, 23 August, 1:00pm	Newcastle Centre of Excellence	Brayden Silvester
Wentworthville Magpies (W)	19 – 18	St George Dragons (W)	Saturday, 23 August, 4:00pm	Ringrose Park	Liam Richardson
Central Coast Roosters (W)	14 – 16	Parramatta Eels (WR)	Sunday, 24 August, 12:00pm	Eric Tweedale Stadium	Liam O'Brien
Canterbury-Bankstown Bulldogs (WR)	10 – 24	Mount Pritchard Mounties (W)	Sunday, 24 August, 3:00pm	Kirkham Oval	Jake Walsh
Round 9
Mount Pritchard Mounties (W)	36 – 10	Wests Tigers (WR)	Saturday, 30 August, 1:00pm	Aubrey Keech Reserve	Jayden Kastelan
Wentworthville Magpies (W)	16 – 30	Central Coast Roosters (W)	Saturday, 30 August, 4:00pm	Ringrose Park	Stuart Halsey
Illawarra Steelers (W)	14 – 18	South Sydney Rabbitohs (W)	Sunday, 31 August, 1:00pm	Collegians Sporting Complex	Bailey Warren
St George Dragons (W)	18 – 24	Penrith Panthers (W)	Sunday, 31 August, 4:00pm	Jubilee Stadium	Matthew Gomes
Cronulla-Sutherland Sharks (WR)	16 – 28	Newcastle Knights (WR)	Sunday, 31 August, 6:30pm	Sharks Stadium	Matt Galvin
Parramatta Eels (WR)	18 – 12	Canterbury-Bankstown Bulldogs (WR)	Monday, 1 September, 7:00pm	Kellyville Park	Harrison Baysarri
Round 10
South Sydney Rabbitohs (W)	14 – 20	Wests Tigers (WR)	Saturday, 6 September, 10:30am	Redfern Oval	Ryan Micallef
Penrith Panthers (W)	12 – 16	Newcastle Knights (WR)	Saturday, 6 September, 12:00pm	Blacktown International Sports Park	Harrison Baysarri
Illawarra Steelers (W)	24 – 16	Cronulla-Sutherland Sharks (WR)	Saturday, 6 September, 5:00pm	Collegians Sporting Complex	Salvatore Marigliano
Central Coast Roosters (W)	16 – 36	Mount Pritchard Mounties (W)	Sunday, 7 September, 11:00am	Woy Woy Oval	Adam Sirianni
Parramatta Eels (WR)	22 – 4	St George Dragons (W)	Sunday, 7 September, 12:00pm	Kellyville Park	Blake Williams
Canterbury-Bankstown Bulldogs (WR)	32 – 16	Wentworthville Magpies (W)	Sunday, 7 September, 1:00pm	Hammondville Oval	Brandan Mani
Round 11
Central Coast Roosters (W)	10 – 20	Cronulla-Sutherland Sharks (WR)	Thursday, 11 September, 5:20pm	Polytec Stadium	Harrison Baysarri
Illawarra Steelers (W)	26 – 12	Wentworthville Magpies (W)	Saturday, 13 September, 11:00am	WIN Stadium	Brandan Mani
Penrith Panthers (W)	26 – 16	Canterbury-Bankstown Bulldogs (WR)	Saturday, 13 September, 11:00am	Blacktown International Sports Park	Liam Richardson
South Sydney Rabbitohs (W)	10 – 28	Mount Pritchard Mounties (W)	Saturday, 13 September, 11:30am	Redfern Oval	Adam Sirianni
Wests Tigers (WR)	28 – 24	Parramatta Eels (WR)	Saturday, 13 September, 12:00pm	Lidcombe Oval	Blake Williams
Newcastle Knights (WR)	32 – 10	St George Dragons (W)	Saturday, 13 September, 3:30pm	Newcastle Centre of Excellence	Salvatore Marigliano
Finals Series
Semi-Finals
Mount Pritchard Mounties (W)	26 – 30	Cronulla-Sutherland Sharks (WR)	Saturday, 20 September, 11:00am	Jubilee Stadium	Blake Williams
Newcastle Knights (WR)	34 – 22	Illawarra Steelers (W)	Saturday, 20 September, 3:00pm	Jubilee Stadium	Brendan Mani
Grand Final
Newcastle Knights (WR)	V	Cronulla-Sutherland Sharks (WR)	Sunday, 28 September, 1:00pm	CommBank Stadium	TBA

==== Grand Final ====
Semi-Finals
1	Newcastle	34
4	Illawarra	22
2	Mount Pritchard	26
3	Cronulla-Sutherland	30

Grand Final
1	Newcastle
3	Cronulla-Sutherland

2025 NSWRL Women's Premiership Grand Final

Sunday, 28 September 2025
1:00pm

Newcastle Knights (WR)	v	Cronulla-Sutherland Sharks (WR)

CommBank Stadium, Sydney

== Tier 2 Competitions ==
=== Ron Massey Cup ===
The Ron Massey Cup (named the Leagues Club Australia Ron Massey Cup for sponsorship reasons) is a second tier men's Rugby League competition in New South Wales. It is the top semi-professional competition in Sydney and acts as a feeder competition into the New South Wales Cup.

==== Teams ====
As of November 2024, there will be 10 teams in the competition, up 2 from 2024. There is also a yet to be approved bid from an 11th team.

After pulling out of the Ron Massey Cup in 2021, Cabramatta announced they would be returning in 2025.

Following their split from Manly Warringah, Blacktown Workers dropped the Sea Eagles moniker and pulled out of the NSW Cup. They will field their own standalone club in 2025. This is the first time Blacktown Workers will field their own standalone side since the inception of the Ron Massey Cup.

Following Round 2, Cabramatta Leagues Club announced that it was pulling funding from the Two Blues, forcing the Two Blues to exit the competition.

Colours	Club	NSW Cup Affiliate	Home ground(s)	Head coach
	Blacktown Workers	South Sydney Rabbitohs	HE Laybutt Sporting Complex	John Toby
	Cabramatta Two Blues	Parramatta Eels	New Era Stadium	Chris Yates
	Canterbury-Bankstown Bulldogs (C)		Hammondville Oval	Dave Swann
	Glebe Dirty Reds	Sydney Roosters	Wentworth Park	Brad Vaughan & Aaron Zammit
	Hills District Bulls	North Sydney Bears	Crestwood Reserve	TBA
	Mount Pritchard Mounties	North Sydney Bears	Aubrey Keech Reserve	Dane Dorahy
	Penrith Brothers	Penrith Panthers	Parker Street Reserve	TBA
	Ryde-Eastwood Hawks	Western Suburbs Magpies	TG Milner Field	TBA
	St Marys Saints	Penrith Panthers	St Marys Leagues Stadium	TBA
	Wentworthville Magpies	Parramatta Eels	Ringrose Park	TBA

State Map	Sydney Map
Home Venues	Home Venues

==== Ladder ====
Pos	Team	Pld	W	D	L	B	PF	PA	PD	Pts	Qualification
1	St Marys Saints	16	14	1	1	4	555	238	+317	37	Minor Premiers & Major Semi-Final
2	Ryde-Eastwood Hawks	16	11	1	4	4	472	312	+160	31	Qualifying Final
3	Mount Pritchard Mounties	16	10	2	4	4	504	281	+223	30	Qualifying Final
4	Wentworthville Magpies	16	10	1	5	4	458	330	+128	29	Elimination Final
5	Glebe Dirty Reds	16	9	1	6	4	504	354	+150	27	Elimination Final
6	Penrith Brothers	16	6	0	10	4	268	386	-118	20	
7	Hills District Bulls	16	5	0	11	4	365	428	–63	18	
8	Canterbury-Bankstown Bulldogs (C)	16	3	0	13	4	322	567	-245	14	
9	Blacktown Workers	16	1	0	15	4	172	724	-552	10	

Updated to match(es) played on 1 September. Source:
Rules for classification: 1) points; 2) point difference; 3) points scored

===== Ladder progression =====
- Numbers highlighted in green indicate that the team finished the round inside the top 5.
- Numbers highlighted in blue indicates the team finished first on the ladder in that round.
- Numbers highlighted in red indicates the team finished last place on the ladder in that round.
- Underlined numbers indicate that the team had a bye during that round.

Pos	Team	1	2	4	5	6	7	8	9	10	3	11	12	13	14	15	16	17	18	19	20
1	St Marys Saints	2	3	7	9	11	13	15	17	19	19	21	23	25	25	27	29	31	33	35	37
2	Ryde-Eastwood Hawks	2	4	4	6	8	10	10	12	12	14	15	17	19	21	23	25	27	29	29	31
3	Mount Pritchard Mounties	2	3	5	7	11	13	15	17	19	19	21	21	23	24	24	26	26	28	28	30
4	Wentworthville Magpies	0	2	4	4	6	6	8	10	12	12	13	13	15	17	19	21	23	25	27	29
5	Glebe Dirty Reds	2	2	4	6	6	8	10	12	12	12	14	16	18	19	21	21	23	25	27	27
6	Penrith Brothers	2	2	4	4	6	6	6	6	6	6	8	8	10	12	12	14	16	18	20	20
7	Hills District Bulls	0	2	2	4	4	4	6	6	8	8	8	8	10	12	12	12	12	14	16	18
8	Canterbury Bankstown Bulldogs (C)	0	2	4	4	4	4	4	4	6	6	6	8	8	10	12	12	12	12	14	14
9	Blacktown Workers	0	0	2	2	2	4	4	4	4	4	4	6	6	8	8	8	8	8	10	10

- Following Round 7, the standings were amended to officially remove Cabramatta and award their matches as byes.

Season Results:

Home	Score	Away	Match Information
Home	Score	Away	Date and Time	Venue	Referee	Video
Round 1
Mount Pritchard Mounties	26 – 36*	Cabramatta Two Blues	Saturday, 15 March, 3:00pm	Aubrey Keech Reserve	Ethan Klein
Canterbury-Bankstown Bulldogs (C)	18 – 28	Penrith Brothers	Saturday, 15 March, 3:45pm	Hammondville Oval	Tom Stindl
Wentworthville Magpies	16 – 24	Ryde-Eastwood Hawks	Saturday, 15 March, 4:00pm	Ringrose Park	Dillan Wells
Blacktown Workers	12 – 62	St Marys Saints	Sunday, 16 March, 11:30am	HE Laybutt Sporting Complex	Mitchell Currie
Glebe Dirty Reds	38 – 32	Hills District Bulls	Sunday, 16 March, 2:00pm	Wentworth Park	Karra-Lee Nolan
Mount Pritchard Mounties		BYE
Round 2
Mount Pritchard Mounties	10 – 10	St Marys Saints	Saturday, 22 March, 3:00pm	Aubrey Keech Reserve	Tom Stindl
Ryde-Eastwood Hawks	24 – 6	Glebe Dirty Reds	Saturday, 22 March, 3:00pm	TG Milner Field	Jake Sutherland
Wentworthville Magpies	30 – 10	Penrith Brothers	Saturday, 22 March, 4:00pm	Ringrose Park	Mitchell Currie
Cabramatta Two Blues	44* – 24	Canterbury Bankstown Bulldogs (C)	Saturday, 22 March, 5:00pm	New Era Stadium	Luke Saldern
Blacktown Workers	6 – 40	Hills District Bulls	Sunday, 23 March, 3:00pm	HE Laybutt Sporting Complex	Dillan Wells
Canterbury-Bankstown Bulldogs (C)		BYE
Round 3
Glebe Dirty Reds	14 – 32	St Marys Saints	Sunday, 30 March, 2:00pm	Wentworth Park	Dillan Wells
Blacktown Workers	10 – 34	Penrith Brothers	Sunday, 30 March, 3:00pm	HE Laybutt Sporting Complex	Michael Ford
Canterbury-Bankstown Bulldogs (C)	20 – 32	Mount Pritchard Mounties	Thursday, 17 April, 7:45pm	Hammondville Oval	Dillan Wells
Ryde-Eastwood Hawks	42 – 16	Hills District Bulls	Saturday, 7 June, 2:00pm	TG Milner Field	Mitchell Currie
Wentworthville Magpies		BYE
Round 4
Canterbury-Bankstown Bulldogs (C)	32 – 26	Hills District Bulls	Saturday, 5 April, 2:45pm	Hammondville Oval	Dillan Wells
Mount Pritchard Mounties	30 – 16	Ryde-Eastwood Hawks	Saturday, 5 April, 3:00pm	Aubrey Keech Reserve	Michael Ford
Penrith Brothers	8 – 38	St Marys Saints	Saturday, 5 April, 6:00pm	Parker Street Reserve	Ethan Klein
Glebe Dirty Reds	40 – 20	Wentworthville Magpies	Sunday, 6 April, 2:00pm	Wentworth Park	Tom Stindl
Blacktown Workers		BYE
Round 5
Wentworthville Magpies	22 – 38	St Marys Saints	Saturday, 12 April, 1:00pm	Lidcombe Oval	Dillan Wells
Penrith Brothers	4 – 40	Glebe Dirty Reds	Saturday, 12 April, 5:00pm	Parker Street Reserve	Tom Stindl
Ryde-Eastwood Hawks	38 – 34	Canterbury Bankstown Bulldogs (C)	Sunday, 13 April, 3:00pm	TG Milner Field	Ethan Klein
Blacktown Workers	4 – 40	Mount Pritchard Mounties	Sunday, 13 April, 3:00pm	HE Laybutt Sporting Complex	Michael Ford
Hills District Bulls		BYE
Round 6 (ANZAC Round)
Mount Pritchard Mounties	24 – 20	Glebe Dirty Reds	Thursday, 24 April, 7:45pm	Aubrey Keech Reserve	Ethan Klein
Canterbury-Bankstown Bulldogs (C)	22 – 42	St Marys Saints	Saturday, 26 April, 5:45pm	Hammondville Oval	Michael Ford
Hills District Bulls	18 – 28	Wentworthville Magpies	Sunday, 27 April, 3:00pm	Crestwood Reserve	Martin Jones
Blacktown Workers	10 – 54	Ryde-Eastwood Hawks	Sunday, 27 April, 3:00pm	HE Laybutt Sporting Complex	Karra-Lee Nolan
Penrith Brothers		BYE
Round 7
Mount Pritchard Mounties	32 – 12	Wentworthville Magpies	Saturday, 3 May, 3:00pm	Aubrey Keech Reserve	Mitchell Currie
St Marys Saints	38 – 4	Hills District Bulls	Saturday, 3 May, 4:00pm	St Marys Leagues Stadium	Ethan Klein
Penrith Brothers	0 – 10	Ryde-Eastwood Hawks	Saturday, 3 May, 5:00pm	Parker Street Reserve	Jake Sutherland
Blacktown Workers	36 – 16	Canterbury Bankstown Bulldogs (C)	Sunday, 4 May, 3:00pm	HE Laybutt Sporting Complex	Michael Ford
Glebe Dirty Reds		BYE
Round 8
St Marys Saints	30 – 20	Ryde-Eastwood Hawks	Saturday, 3 May, 4:00pm	St Marys Leagues Stadium	Mitchell Currie
Glebe Dirty Reds	32 – 24	Blacktown Workers	Sunday, 11 May, 1:00pm	Wentworth Park	Jake Sutherland
Wentworthville Magpies	22 – 14	Canterbury Bankstown Bulldogs (C)	Sunday, 11 May, 2:00pm	Ringrose Park	Billy Greatbatch
Hills District Bulls	12 – 6	Penrith Brothers	Sunday, 11 May, 3:00pm	Crestwood Reserve	Luke Saldern
Mount Pritchard Mounties		BYE
Round 9
Penrith Brothers	14 – 38	Wentworthville Magpies	Saturday, 24 May, 3:00pm	Ringrose Park	Ethan Klein
Glebe Dirty Reds	42 – 18	Canterbury Bankstown Bulldogs (C)	Sunday, 25 May, 2:00pm	Wentworth Park	Tom Stindl
Mount Pritchard Mounties	30 – 24	Hills District Bulls	Sunday, 25 May, 3:00pm	Aubrey Keech Reserve	Luke Saldern
St Marys Saints	46 – 8	Blacktown Workers	Sunday, 25 May, 3:00pm	St Marys Leagues Stadium	Jake Sutherland
Ryde-Eastwood Hawks		BYE
Round 10
St Marys Saints	34 – 12	Glebe Dirty Reds	Saturday, 31 May, 4:00pm	St Marys Leagues Stadium	Karra-Lee Nolan
Penrith Brothers	6 – 40	Mount Pritchard Mounties	Saturday, 31 May, 5:00pm	Aubrey Keech Reserve	Martin Jones
Blacktown Workers	0 – 58	Wentworthville Magpies	Saturday, 31 May, 6:30pm	HE Laybutt Sporting Complex	Michael Ford
Hills District Bulls	24 – 6	Ryde-Eastwood Hawks	Sunday, 1 June, 3:00pm	Crestwood Reserve	Tom Stindl
Canterbury-Bankstown Bulldogs (C)		BYE
Round 11
Penrith Brothers	44 – 0	Blacktown Workers	Saturday, 14 June, 5:00pm	Parker Street Reserve	Michael Ford
Mount Pritchard Mounties	58 – 22	Canterbury Bankstown Bulldogs (C)	Sunday, 15 June, 1:00pm	North Sydney Oval	Mitchell Currie
Ryde-Eastwood Hawks	30 – 30	Wentworthville Magpies	Sunday, 15 June, 2:30pm	TG Milner Field	Tom Stindl
Hills District Bulls	6 – 34	Glebe Dirty Reds	Sunday, 15 June, 3:00pm	Crestwood Reserve	Jake Sutherland
St Marys Saints		BYE
Round 12
St Marys Saints	32 – 8	Penrith Brothers	Saturday, 21 June, 3:00pm	St Marys Leagues Stadium	Ethan Klein
Ryde-Eastwood Hawks	28 – 24	Mount Pritchard Mounties	Sunday, 22 June, 2:30pm	TG Milner Field	Martin Jones
Wentworthville Magpies	24 – 50	Glebe Dirty Reds	Sunday, 22 June, 3:00pm	Ringrose Park	Billy Greatbatch
Hills District Bulls	28 – 34	Canterbury Bankstown Bulldogs (C)	Sunday, 22 June, 3:00pm	Crestwood Reserve	Gage Miles
Blacktown Workers		BYE
Round 13
Ryde-Eastwood Hawks	48 – 16	Blacktown Workers	Saturday, 28 June, 2:00pm	TG Milner Field	Jake Sutherland
Penrith Brothers	24 – 14	Canterbury Bankstown Bulldogs (C)	Saturday, 28 June, 5:00pm	Parker Street Reserve	Michael Ford
Glebe Dirty Reds	BYE	Mount Pritchard Mounties
St Marys Saints	BYE	Wentworthville Magpies
Hills District Bulls	BYE
Round 14
St Marys Saints	16 – 38	Wentworthville Magpies	Saturday, 5 July, 3:00pm	St Marys Leagues Stadium	Martin Jones
Glebe Dirty Reds	26 – 26	Mount Pritchard Mounties	Sunday, 6 July, 2:50pm	Wentworth Park	Jake Sutherland
Penrith Brothers	BYE	Hills District Bulls
Ryde-Eastwood Hawks	BYE	Canterbury Bankstown Bulldogs (C)
Blacktown Workers	BYE
Round 15
St Marys Saints	36 – 24	Mount Pritchard Mounties	Saturday, 12 July, 3:00pm	St Marys Leagues Stadium	Jake Sutherland
Canterbury-Bankstown Bulldogs (C)	38 – 24	Blacktown Workers	Saturday, 12 July, 5:45pm	Hammondville Oval	Billy Greatbatch
Ryde-Eastwood Hawks	42 – 14	Penrith Brothers	Sunday, 13 July, 2:30pm	TG Milner Field	Brayden Hunt
Wentworthville Magpies	42 – 22	Hills District Bulls	Sunday, 13 July, 3:00pm	Ringrose Park	Louis Matheson
Glebe Dirty Reds		BYE
Round 16
Mount Pritchard Mounties	80 – 0	Blacktown Workers	Saturday, 19 July, 3:00pm	Aubrey Keech Reserve	Brendan Mani
Canterbury-Bankstown Bulldogs (C)	16 – 28	Ryde-Eastwood Hawks	Sunday, 20 July, 12:45pm	Hammondville Oval	Brayden Hunt
Glebe Dirty Reds	16 – 26	Penrith Brothers	Sunday, 20 July, 2:00pm	Wentworth Park	Karra-Lee Nolan
Hills District Bulls	14 – 22	St Marys Saints	Sunday, 20 July, 3:00pm	Crestwood Reserve	Louis Matheson
Wentworthville Magpies		BYE
Round 17 (Leagues Club Australia Magic Round)
Blacktown Workers	6 – 62	Glebe Dirty Reds	Saturday, 26 July, 11:00am	St Marys Leagues Stadium	Michael Ford
Penrith Brothers	32 – 26	Hills District Bulls	Saturday, 26 July, 1:00pm	St Marys Leagues Stadium	Brendan Mani
Wentworthville Magpies	18 – 12	Mount Pritchard Mounties	Saturday, 26 July, 3:00pm	St Marys Leagues Stadium	Louis Matheson
St Marys Saints	57 – 4	Canterbury Bankstown Bulldogs (C)	Saturday, 26 July, 5:00pm	St Marys Leagues Stadium	Gage Miles
Ryde-Eastwood Hawks		BYE
Round 18
Wentworthville Magpies	26 – 0	Blacktown Workers	Saturday, 2 August, 6:00pm	Ringrose Park	Louis Matheson
Canterbury-Bankstown Bulldogs (C)	10 – 48	Glebe Dirty Reds	Wednesday, 6 August, 7:00pm	McCredie Park	Brendan Mani
Penrith Brothers	BYE	Mount Pritchard Mounties
Hills District Bulls	BYE	St Marys Saints
Ryde-Eastwood Hawks	BYE
Round 19
Ryde-Eastwood Hawks	18 – 22	St Marys Saints	Sunday, 10 August, 2:00pm	TG Milner Field	Louis Matheson
Hills District Bulls	29 – 22	Mount Pritchard Mounties	Sunday, 10 August, 3:00pm	Crestwood Reserve	Jake Sutherland
Glebe Dirty Reds	BYE	Wentworthville Magpies
Canterbury-Bankstown Bulldogs (C)	BYE	Blacktown Workers
Penrith Brothers	BYE
Round 20
Mount Pritchard Mounties	20 – 10	Penrith Brothers	Saturday, 16 August, 3:00pm	Aubrey Keech Reserve	Brendan Mani
Canterbury-Bankstown Bulldogs (C)	10 – 34	Wentworthville Magpies	Saturday, 16 August, 5:45pm	Hammondville Oval	Louis Matheson
Glebe Dirty Reds	24 – 44	Ryde-Eastwood Hawks	Sunday, 17 August, 2:00pm	Wentworth Park	Blake Williams
Hills District Bulls	44 – 16	Blacktown Workers	Sunday, 17 August, 3:00pm	Crestwood Reserve	Karra-Lee Nolan
St Marys Saints		BYE
Finals Series
Qualifying & Elimination Finals
Wentworthville Magpies	26 – 8	Glebe Dirty Reds	Saturday, 23 August, 3:00pm	Ringrose Park	Luke Saldern
Ryde-Eastwood Hawks	36 – 22	Mount Pritchard Mounties	Saturday, 23 August, 5:00pm	HE Laybutt Sporting Complex	Mitchell Currie
Major & Minor Semi-Finals
Mount Pritchard Mounties	18 – 32	Wentworthville Magpies	Saturday, 30 August, 1:00pm	St Marys Leagues Stadium	Luke Saldern
St Marys Saints	52 – 16	Ryde-Eastwood Hawks	Saturday, 30 August, 5:00pm	St Marys Leagues Stadium	Mitchell Currie
Preliminary Final
Ryde-Eastwood Hawks	10 – 26	Wentworthville Magpies	Saturday, 6 September, 3:00pm	Leichhardt Oval	Mitchell Currie
Grand Final
St Marys Saints	34 – 22	Wentworthville Magpies	Saturday, 13 September, 3:00pm	Leichhardt Oval	Mitchell Currie

==== Grand Final ====
Qualifying & Elimination Finals
2	Ryde-Eastwood	36
3	Mount Pritchard	22
4	Wentworthville	26
5	Glebe	8

Major Semi-Final
1	St Marys	52
2	Ryde-Eastwood	16
Minor Semi-Final
3	Mount Pritchard	18
4	Wentworthville	32

Preliminary Final
2	Ryde-Eastwood	10
4	Wentworthville	26

Grand Final
1	St Marys	34
4	Wentworthville	22

2025 Ron Massey Cup Grand Final

Saturday, 13 September 2025
3:00pm

St Marys Saints	34 – 22	Wentworthville Magpies
Tries: Christian Crichton (8', 48') 2 Bryce Cartwright (23') 1 Steve Tavita (30') 1 Michael Jennings (36') 1 Zac Greene (74') 1 Goals: Zac Greene 5/6 (25', 32', 38', 50', 75'); Sin bin: Anthony Layoun (73'); Sent off: Brad Keighran (65')	1st: 22 – 6; 2nd: 12 – 16	Tries: 1 (12') Josh Bergamin; 1 (56') Chris Tupou; 1 (77') Austin Quast; 1 (80') Beau Newlands; Goals: 3/4 Dylan White (14', 58', 78'); Sin bin: (47') Shalom O'Ofou; Sent off: (65') Raymond Maroun

Leichhardt Oval, Sydney
Referee: Mitchell Currie
Touch judges: Patrick Mackey & Mitchell Stone
In Goal judges: Ethan Murray & Jack Bird
Player of the Match: Zac Greene

Team details
St Marys		Position	Wentworthville
Name	Number	Position	Number	Name
Todd Sapienza	1	Fullback	1	Josh Bergamin
Christian Crichton	2	Wing	2	Austin Quast
Michael Jennings	3	Centre	3	Joshuah Minhinnick
Ioane Seiuli	4	Centre	11	Chris Tupou
Samuel Curtain	5	Wing	5	Beau Newlands
Anthony Layoun	6	Five eighth	6	Raymond Maroun
Zac Greene	7	Half back	7	Dylan White
Aden Perry	8	Prop forward	8	Reece Alderton
Brad Keighran	9	Hooker	9	Ryan Pritchard
Mitchell Butfield	10	Prop forward	24	Beni Valu
Steve Tavita	11	Second row	10	Leo Nasio
Bryce Cartwright	12	Second row	12	Felix Niutili-Schmidt
Jake Rafferty-Butfield	13	Lock forward	13	Blake Cook
Connor Mason	14	Interchange	15	Adam Spicer
Cayne Nicholas	16	Interchange	16	Shalom O'Ofou
Leroy Magalogo	17	Interchange	21	Mason McCarthy
Anton Iaria	19	Interchange	23	Epeli Sukanaivalu
Jhett Sydir	21	Reserve	20	Liam Scolari
Darren Baker		Coach		Brett Cook
https://www.nswrl.com.au/draw/ron-massey-cup/2025/grand-final/game-1/teamlist/

=== Newcastle Premiership ===
The Newcastle Premiership (named the Denton Engineering Cup for sponsorship reasons) is a second tier men's Rugby League competition in New South Wales. It is the top semi-professional competition in Newcastle and is often regarded as the most competitive regional competition in the state.

==== Teams ====
All 11 teams that featured in 2024 will once again feature.

Colours	Club	NSW Cup Affiliate	Home ground(s)	Head coach
	Central Newcastle Butcher Boys	Newcastle Knights	St John Oval	TBA
	Cessnock Goannas	Newcastle Knights	Cessnock Sportsground	TBA
	Kurri Kurri Bulldogs	Newcastle Knights	Kurri Kurri Sportsground	TBA
	Lakes United Seagulls	Newcastle Knights	Cahill Oval	TBA
	Macquarie Scorpions	Newcastle Knights	Lyall Peacock Field	TBA
	Maitland Pickers	Newcastle Knights	Maitland Sportsground	TBA
	Northern Hawks	Newcastle Knights	Tomaree Sportsground	TBA
	South Newcastle Lions	Newcastle Knights	Townson Oval	TBA
	The Entrance Tigers	Newcastle Knights	EDSAAC Oval	TBA
	Western Suburbs Rosellas	Newcastle Knights	Harker Oval	TBA
	Wyong Roos	Newcastle Knights	Morry Breen Oval	TBA

State Map	Newcastle Map
Home Venues	Home Venues

==== Ladder ====
Pos	Team	Pld	W	D	L	B	PF	PA	PD	Pts	Qualification
1	Maitland Pickers	16	12	1	3	2	382	198	+184	29	Minor Premiers & Major Semi-Final
2	Cessnock Goannas	16	11	0	5	2	332	245	+87	26	Qualifying Final
3	Wyong Roos	16	10	1	5	2	355	250	+105	25	Qualifying Final
4	Western Suburbs Rosellas	16	10	0	6	2	404	239	+165	24	Elimination Final
5	The Entrance Tigers	16	10	0	6	2	284	273	+11	24	Elimination Final
6	Central Newcastle Butcher Boys	16	9	0	7	2	311	290	+21	22	
7	Kurri Kurri Bulldogs	16	9	0	7	2	274	342	–68	22	
8	South Newcastle Lions	16	7	0	9	2	338	350	–12	18	
9	Macquarie Scorpions	16	5	0	11	2	313	462	-149	14	
10	Lakes United Seagulls	16	4	0	12	2	310	357	–47	12	
11	Northern Hawks	16	0	0	16	2	198	495	-297	4	

Updated to match(es) played on 1 September. Source:
Rules for classification: 1) points; 2) point difference; 3) points scored

===== Ladder progression =====
- Numbers highlighted in green indicate that the team finished the round inside the top 5.
- Numbers highlighted in blue indicates the team finished first on the ladder in that round.
- Numbers highlighted in red indicates the team finished last place on the ladder in that round.
- Underlined numbers indicate that the team had a bye during that round.

Pos	Team	1	3	5	7	8	9	10	11	12	13	2	14	15	6	4	17	16	18
1	Maitland Pickers	2	6	8	9	11	13	13	15	17	19	19	21	23	23	27	29	29	29
2	Cessnock Goannas	2	6	6	10	10	10	10	12	14	16	16	18	20	20	22	24	24	26
3	Wyong Roos	0	2	2	7	9	11	13	15	17	19	19	21	21	21	21	23	23	25
4	Western Suburbs Rosellas	2	6	8	10	10	12	12	14	14	16	16	16	18	20	20	20	22	24
5	Central Newcastle Butcher Boys	0	0	0	2	4	6	8	10	12	14	16	16	18	18	20	22	22	22
6	The Entrance Tigers	2	2	4	6	8	10	12	12	14	16	16	18	18	20	22	22	22	24
7	Kurri Kurri Bulldogs	2	4	6	8	8	8	10	10	12	14	14	14	16	16	18	20	20	22
8	South Newcastle Lions	2	4	6	8	10	12	14	14	14	14	14	16	18	18	18	18	18	18
9	Macquarie Scorpions	0	0	2	6	6	8	10	10	10	10	10	12	12	12	12	14	14	14
10	Lakes United Seagulls	0	4	4	8	8	8	8	10	10	10	10	10	10	10	10	10	10	12
11	Northern Hawks	0	0	0	0	2	2	2	2	2	2	2	2	2	2	4	4	4	4

Season Results:

Home	Score	Away	Match Information
Home	Score	Away	Date and Time	Venue	Referee	Video
Round 1 (Magic Round)
Northern Hawks	20 – 38	Kurri Kurri Bulldogs	Saturday, 12 April, 12:00pm	Newcastle No.1 Sportsground	Jack Fisher
The Entrance Tigers	22 – 18	Central Newcastle Butcher Boys	Saturday, 12 April, 1:40pm	Newcastle No.1 Sportsground	Kurt Grogan
Cessnock Goannas	20 – 10	Wyong Roos	Saturday, 12 April, 3:20pm	Newcastle No.1 Sportsground	Brett Eyb
Lakes United Seagulls	6 – 22	Western Suburbs Rosellas	Saturday, 12 April, 5:00pm	Newcastle No.1 Sportsground	Tom Taylor
South Newcastle Lions	34 – 12	Macquarie Scorpions	Saturday, 12 April, 6:40pm	Newcastle No.1 Sportsground	Cameron Smith
Maitland Pickers		BYE
Round 2 (Easter Round)
Kurri Kurri Bulldogs	6 – 34	Lakes United Seagulls	Thursday, 17 April, 8:30pm	Kurri Kurri Sportsground	Kurt Grogan
Western Suburbs Rosellas	22 – 0	The Entrance Tigers	Friday, 18 April, 3:00pm	Harker Oval	Brett Eyb
Macquarie Scorpions	20 – 22	Maitland Pickers	Friday, 18 April, 3:00pm	Lyall Peacock Field	Tom Taylor
Northern Hawks	18 – 36	South Newcastle Lions	Friday, 18 April, 3:00pm	Tomaree Sportsground	Cameron Smith
Central Newcastle Butcher Boys	16 – 6	Wyong Roos	Wednesday, 16 July, 7:45pm	St John Oval	Tom Taylor
Cessnock Goannas		BYE
Round 3 (ANZAC Round)
Wyong Roos	24 – 12	Northern Hawks	Thursday, 24 April, 7:45pm	Morry Breen Oval	Tom Taylor
Lakes United Seagulls	32 – 10	The Entrance Tigers	Friday, 25 April, 1:00pm	Cahill Oval	Cameron Smith
Central Newcastle Butcher Boys	12 – 28	Western Suburbs Rosellas	Friday, 25 April, 3:00pm	St John Oval	Joey Butler
Cessnock Goannas	40 – 22	Macquarie Scorpions	Friday, 25 April, 5:00pm	Cessnock Sportsground	Jackson James Walsh
Maitland Pickers	20 – 18	South Newcastle Lions	Saturday, 26 April, 3:15pm	Maitland Sportsground	Kurt Grogan
Kurri Kurri Bulldogs		BYE
Round 4
South Newcastle Lions	34 – 18	Kurri Kurri Bulldogs	Saturday, 17 May, 3:00pm	Kurri Kurri Sportsground	Kurt Grogan
Western Suburbs Rosellas	8 – 12	Macquarie Scorpions	Saturday, 17 May, 3:00pm	Harker Oval	Jack Fisher
The Entrance Tigers	18 – 22	Cessnock Goannas	Sunday, 18 May, 3:00pm	EDSAAC Oval	Joey Butler
Northern Hawks	4 – 46	Maitland Pickers	Wednesday, 6 August, 7:45pm	Mallabula Sporting Complex	Cameron Smith
Lakes United Seagulls	12 – 14	Central Newcastle Butcher Boys	Wednesday, 13 August, 7:45pm	Cahill Oval	Kurt Grogan
Wyong Roos		BYE
Round 5
Macquarie Scorpions	22 – 20	Lakes United Seagulls	Saturday, 10 May, 3:00pm	Lyall Peacock Field	Joey Butler
Cessnock Goannas	0 – 38	Maitland Pickers	Saturday, 10 May, 3:00pm	Cessnock Sportsground	Tom Taylor
Central Newcastle Butcher Boys	18 – 20	Kurri Kurri Bulldogs	Saturday, 10 May, 6:00pm	St John Oval	Jackson James Walsh
South Newcastle Lions	30 – 10	Northern Hawks	Sunday, 11 May, 3:00pm	Townson Oval	Cameron Smith
The Entrance Tigers	12 – 6	Wyong Roos	Sunday, 11 May, 3:00pm	EDSAAC Oval	Kurt Grogan
Western Suburbs Rosellas		BYE
Round 6
Wyong Roos	30 – 12	South Newcastle Lions	Sunday, 25 May, 3:00pm	Morry Breen Oval	Jack Fisher
Cessnock Goannas	18 – 10	Northern Hawks	Sunday, 25 May, 3:00pm	Cessnock Sportsground	Joey Butler
Maitland Pickers	18 – 22	Central Newcastle Butcher Boys	Sunday, 25 May, 3:15pm	Maitland Sportsground	Sam Daley
Macquarie Scorpions	12 – 30	The Entrance Tigers	Saturday, 2 August, 12:00pm	Pirtek Park	Tom Taylor
Kurri Kurri Bulldogs	12 – 30	Western Suburbs Rosellas	Wednesday, 6 August, 8:00pm	Kurri Kurri Sportsground	Joey Butler
Lakes United Seagulls		BYE
Round 7
The Entrance Tigers	24 – 4	Northern Hawks	Saturday, 31 May, 2:30pm	EDSAAC Oval	Sam Daley
Cessnock Goannas	14 – 18	Kurri Kurri Bulldogs	Saturday, 31 May, 3:00pm	Cessnock Sportsground	Cameron Mitchell
Lakes United Seagulls	46 – 12	South Newcastle Lions	Saturday, 31 May, 3:00pm	Cahill Oval	Jack Fisher
Maitland Pickers	18 – 18	Wyong Roos	Saturday, 31 May, 3:00pm	Maitland Sportsground	Joey Butler
Western Suburbs Rosellas	24 – 18	Central Newcastle Butcher Boys	Saturday, 31 May, 3:00pm	Harker Oval	Tom Taylor
Macquarie Scorpions		BYE
Round 8
Kurri Kurri Bulldogs	18 – 30	Central Newcastle Butcher Boys	Saturday, 7 June, 3:00pm	Kurri Kurri Sportsground	Sam Daley
Wyong Roos	34 – 22	Macquarie Scorpions	Saturday, 7 June, 3:00pm	Morry Breen Oval	Cameron Mitchell
Lakes United Seagulls	20 – 31	Maitland Pickers	Saturday, 7 June, 3:00pm	Cahill Oval	Kurt Grogan
South Newcastle Lions	22 – 20	Cessnock Goannas	Saturday, 7 June, 3:00pm	Townson Oval	Joey Butler
The Entrance Tigers	25 – 24	Western Suburbs Rosellas	Sunday, 8 June, 3:00pm	EDSAAC Oval	Tom Taylor
Northern Hawks		BYE
Round 9
Lakes United Seagulls	6 – 22	Wyong Roos	Saturday, 14 June, 3:00pm	Cahill Oval	Tom Taylor
Macquarie Scorpions	12 – 10	Northern Hawks	Saturday, 14 June, 3:00pm	Lyall Peacock Field	Sam Daley
Maitland Pickers	12 – 10	Cessnock Goannas	Saturday, 14 June, 3:00pm	Maitland Sportsground	Kurt Grogan
Western Suburbs Rosellas	26 – 0	Kurri Kurri Bulldogs	Sunday, 15 June, 3:00pm	Harker Oval	Joey Butler
Central Newcastle Butcher Boys	BYE	South Newcastle Lions
The Entrance Tigers	BYE
Round 10
Kurri Kurri Bulldogs	16 – 14	Cessnock Goannas	Saturday, 21 June, 3:00pm	Kurri Kurri Sportsground	Tom Taylor
Western Suburbs Rosellas	18 – 20	Wyong Roos	Saturday, 21 June, 3:00pm	Harker Oval	Jack Fisher
Central Newcastle Butcher Boys	22 – 14	Maitland Pickers	Saturday, 21 June, 6:00pm	St John Oval	Cameron Mitchell
Northern Hawks	16 – 23	The Entrance Tigers	Sunday, 22 June, 3:00pm	Tomaree Sportsground	Kurt Grogan
South Newcastle Lions	32 – 20	Lakes United Seagulls	Sunday, 22 June, 3:00pm	Townson Oval	Joey Butler
Macquarie Scorpions		BYE
Round 11
Maitland Pickers	24 – 10	Kurri Kurri Bulldogs	Saturday, 28 June, 3:00pm	Maitland Sportsground	Joey Butler
Wyong Roos	26 – 6	The Entrance Tigers	Sunday, 29 June, 3:00pm	Morry Breen Oval	Tom Taylor
Northern Hawks	14 – 28	Lakes United Seagulls	Sunday, 29 June, 3:00pm	Lakeside Sporting Complex	Jack Fisher
Western Suburbs Rosellas	36 – 14	South Newcastle Lions	Sunday, 29 June, 3:00pm	Harker Oval	Louis Matheson
Central Newcastle Butcher Boys	24 – 22	Macquarie Scorpions	Sunday, 29 June, 3:15pm	St John Oval	Kurt Grogan
Cessnock Goannas		BYE
Round 12 (Indigenous Round)
Cessnock Goannas	28 – 20	Western Suburbs Rosellas	Saturday, 5 July, 3:00pm	Cessnock Sportsground	Kurt Grogan
Kurri Kurri Bulldogs	16 – 12	South Newcastle Lions	Saturday, 5 July, 3:00pm	Kurri Kurri Sportsground	Joey Butler
Maitland Pickers	38 – 4	Northern Hawks	Saturday, 5 July, 3:00pm	Maitland Sportsground	Jack Fisher
Central Newcastle Butcher Boys	30 – 12	Lakes United Seagulls	Sunday, 6 July, 3:00pm	St John Oval	Tom Taylor
The Entrance Tigers	36 – 32	Macquarie Scorpions	Sunday, 6 July, 3:00pm	EDSAAC Oval	Cameron Smith
Wyong Roos		BYE
Round 13 (Indigenous Round)
Lakes United Seagulls	14 – 22	Kurri Kurri Bulldogs	Saturday, 12 July, 3:00pm	Cahill Oval	Cameron Smith
Macquarie Scorpions	12 – 28	Cessnock Goannas	Saturday, 12 July, 3:00pm	Lyall Peacock Field	Joey Butler
Northern Hawks	14 – 26	Wyong Roos	Saturday, 12 July, 5:00pm	Lakeside Sporting Complex	Kurt Grogan
South Newcastle Lions	12 – 28	Central Newcastle Butcher Boys	Sunday, 13 July, 3:00pm	Townson Oval	Tom Taylor
Maitland Pickers	BYE	The Entrance Tigers
Western Suburbs Rosellas	BYE
Round 14
Kurri Kurri Bulldogs	10 – 34	The Entrance Tigers	Saturday, 19 July, 3:00pm	Kurri Kurri Sportsground	Jack Fisher
Western Suburbs Rosellas	6 – 40	Maitland Pickers	Saturday, 19 July, 3:00pm	Harker Oval	Joey Butler
Wyong Roos	31 – 22	Lakes United Seagulls	Sunday, 20 July, 3:00pm	Morry Breen Oval	Cameron Smith
Northern Hawks	26 – 36	Macquarie Scorpions	Sunday, 20 July, 3:00pm	Lakeside Sporting Complex	Tom Taylor
Central Newcastle Butcher Boys	8 – 36	Cessnock Goannas	Sunday, 20 July, 3:00pm	St John Oval	Kurt Grogan
South Newcastle Lions		BYE
Round 15
Cessnock Goannas	30 – 6	Lakes United Seagulls	Saturday, 26 July, 3:00pm	Cessnock Sportsground	Tom Taylor
Maitland Pickers	7 – 6	The Entrance Tigers	Saturday, 26 July, 3:00pm	Maitland Sportsground	Kurt Grogan
Wyong Roos	18 – 24	Kurri Kurri Bulldogs	Saturday, 26 July, 3:00pm	Morry Breen Oval	Jack Fisher
Northern Hawks	20 – 40	Western Suburbs Rosellas	Saturday, 26 July, 3:00pm	Lakeside Sporting Complex	Cameron Smith
South Newcastle Lions	40 – 18	Macquarie Scorpions	Sunday, 27 July, 3:00pm	Townson Oval	Joey Butler
Central Newcastle Butcher Boys		BYE
Round 16 (Sleapy's Day)
South Newcastle Lions	10 – 24	Maitland Pickers	Saturday, 9 August, 3:00pm	Townson Oval	Tom Taylor
Macquarie Scorpions	8 – 32	Kurri Kurri Bulldogs	Sunday, 10 August, 3:00pm	Lyall Peacock Field	Jackson James Walsh
The Entrance Tigers	20 – 16	Central Newcastle Butcher Boys	Sunday, 10 August, 3:00pm	EDSAAC Oval	Joey Butler
Wyong Roos	12 – 16	Cessnock Goannas	Sunday, 10 August, 3:00pm	Morry Breen Oval	Kurt Grogan
Lakes United Seagulls	4 – 30	Western Suburbs Rosellas	Tuesday, 19 August, 7:30pm	Newcastle Centre of Excellence	Kurt Grogan
Northern Hawks		BYE
Round 17
Cessnock Goannas	16 – 6	The Entrance Tigers	Saturday, 16 August, 3:00pm	Cessnock Sportsground	Kurt Grogan
Lakes United Seagulls	28 – 29	Macquarie Scorpions	Saturday, 16 August, 3:00pm	Cahill Oval	Jack Fisher
Maitland Pickers	18 – 14	Western Suburbs Rosellas	Saturday, 16 August, 3:00pm	Maitland Sportsground	Tom Taylor
South Newcastle Lions	10 – 22	Wyong Roos	Saturday, 16 August, 3:00pm	Townson Oval	Joey Butler
Central Newcastle Butcher Boys	20 – 6	Northern Hawks	Saturday, 16 August, 3:00pm	St John Oval	Jackson James Walsh
Kurri Kurri Bulldogs		BYE
Round 18
Cessnock Goannas	20 – 15	Central Newcastle Butcher Boys	Saturday, 23 August, 3:00pm	Cessnock Sportsground	Joey Butler
Kurri Kurri Bulldogs	14 – 12	Maitland Pickers	Saturday, 23 August, 3:00pm	Kurri Kurri Sportsground	Jackson James Walsh
Western Suburbs Rosellas	56 – 10	Northern Hawks	Saturday, 23 August, 3:00pm	Harker Oval	Tom Taylor
Macquarie Scorpions	22 – 50	Wyong Roos	Saturday, 23 August, 3:00pm	Lyall Peacock Field	Jack Fisher
The Entrance Tigers	12 – 10	South Newcastle Lions	Sunday, 24 August, 3:00pm	EDSAAC Oval	Kurt Grogan
Lakes United Seagulls		BYE
Finals Series
Qualifying & Elimination Finals
Cessnock Goannas	26 – 12	Wyong Roos	Saturday, 30 August, 3:00pm	Cessnock Sportsground	Kurt Grogan
Western Suburbs Rosellas	16 – 14	The Entrance Tigers	Sunday, 31 August, 3:00pm	Harker Oval	Joey Butler
Major & Minor Semi-Finals
Maitland Pickers	36 – 8	Cessnock Goannas	Saturday, 6 September, 3:00pm	Maitland Sportsground	Joey Butler
Wyong Roos	16 – 30	Western Suburbs Rosellas	Sunday, 7 September, 3:00pm	Morry Breen Oval	Kurt Grogan
Preliminary Final
Cessnock Goannas	26 – 24	Western Suburbs Rosellas	Sunday, 14 September, 3:00pm	Kurri Kurri Sportsground	Kurt Grogan
Grand Final
Maitland Pickers	V	Cessnock Goannas	Sunday, 21 September, 3:00pm	McDonald Jones Stadium	Kurt Grogan

==== Grand Final ====
Qualifying & Elimination Finals
2	Cessnock	26
3	Wyong	12
4	Western Suburbs	16
5	The Entrance	14

Major Semi-Final
1	Maitland	36
2	Cessnock	8
Minor Semi-Final
3	Wyong	16
4	Western Suburbs	30

Preliminary Final
2	Cessnock	26
4	Western Suburbs	24

Grand Final
1	Maitland
2	Cessnock

2025 Newcastle Premiership Grand Final

Sunday, 21 September
3:30pm

Maitland Pickers	v	Cessnock Goannas

McDonald Jones Stadium, Newcastle

=== Illawarra Premiership ===
The Illawarra Premiership (named the Harrigan Premiership for sponsorship reasons) is a second tier men's Rugby League competition in New South Wales. It is the top semi-professional competition in Wollongong and is regarded as one of the most competitive regional competitions in the state. In December 2024, the Illawarra League announced they'd be returning to Major Competition status for 2025. Previously, the Illawarra Premiership was a part of the Major Competitions between 2021 and 2023, but due to issues over costs, the League dropped to the Premiership Division for 2024.

==== Teams ====
The same 6 teams that competed in 2024 will once again compete in 2024

In October 2024, De La Salle announced they would leaving the Illawarra competition and attempting to join the Ron Massey Cup. Upon Illawarra returning to Major Competition status, it was announced that De La Salle would remain in the competition for 2025.

Colours	Club	NSW Cup Affiliate	Home ground(s)	Head coach
	Collegians Collie Dogs	St George Illawarra Dragons	Collegians Sports Stadium	TBA
	Corrimal Cougars	St George Illawarra Dragons	Ziems Park	TBA
	Dapto Canaries	St George Illawarra Dragons	Dapto Showground	TBA
	De La Salle Caringbah	Newtown Jets	Captain Cook Oval	TBA
	Thirroul Butchers	St George Illawarra Dragons	Thomas Gibson Park	TBA
	Western Suburbs Red Devils	St George Illawarra Dragons	Sid Parish Park	TBA

State Map	Wollongong Map
Home Venues	Home Venues

==== Ladder ====
Pos	Team	Pld	W	D	L	B	PF	PA	PD	Pts	Qualification
1	Collegians Collie Dogs	15	13	0	2	0	477	198	+279	26	Minor Premiers & Major Semi-Final
2	Western Suburbs Red Devils	15	9	0	6	0	316	212	+104	18	Qualifying Final
3	Dapto Canaries	15	8	0	7	0	322	324	–2	16	Qualifying Final
4	De La Salle Caringbah	15	6	0	9	0	245	353	-108	12	Elimination Final
5	Corrimal Cougars	15	5	0	10	0	254	436	-182	10	Elimination Final
6	Thirroul Butchers	15	4	0	11	0	258	349	–91	8	

Updated to match(es) played on 1 September. Source:
Rules for classification: 1) points; 2) point difference; 3) points scored

===== Ladder progression =====
- Numbers highlighted in green indicate that the team finished the round inside the top 5.
- Numbers highlighted in blue indicates the team finished first on the ladder in that round.
- Numbers highlighted in red indicates the team finished last place on the ladder in that round.
- Underlined numbers indicate that the team had a bye during that round.

Pos	Team	1	2	3	4	6	7	8	9	10	5	11	12	13	14	15
1	Collegians Collie Dogs	2	4	6	8	8	10	12	14	14	16	18	20	22	24	26
2	Western Suburbs Red Devils	0	2	4	6	8	10	10	10	10	12	12	14	14	16	18
3	Dapto Canaries	2	2	2	2	4	6	8	8	10	10	12	14	16	16	16
4	De La Salle Caringbah	2	4	4	4	6	6	6	8	10	10	12	12	12	12	12
5	Corrimal Cougars	0	0	0	0	0	0	2	4	4	6	6	6	8	8	10
6	Thirroul Butchers	0	0	2	4	4	4	4	4	6	6	6	6	6	8	8

Season Results:

Home	Score	Away	Match Information
Home	Score	Away	Date and Time	Venue	Referee	Video
Round 1 (ANZAC Round)
Collegians Collie Dogs	28 – 26	Western Suburbs Red Devils	Thursday, 24 April, 6:30pm	Collegians Sports Stadium	William Damato
De La Salle Caringbah	30 – 12	Thirroul Butchers	Saturday, 26 April, 3:00pm	Captain Cook Oval	William Damato
Corrimal Cougars	22 – 36	Dapto Canaries	Saturday, 26 April, 3:00pm	Ziems Park	Taylor Cleveland
Round 2
Collegians Collie Dogs	68 – 0	Corrimal Cougars	Saturday, 3 May, 3:00pm	Collegians Sports Stadium	William Damato
Western Suburbs Red Devils	30 – 10	Thirroul Butchers	Saturday, 3 May, 3:00pm	Mount Kembla Park	Michael Chin
Dapto Canaries	16 – 36	De La Salle Caringbah	Sunday, 4 May, 3:00pm	Dapto Showground	Luke Mungovan
Round 3
De La Salle Caringbah	16 – 20	Collegians Collie Dogs	Saturday, 10 May, 3:00pm	Captain Cook Oval	Salvatore Marigliano
Thirroul Butchers	32 – 24	Dapto Canaries	Saturday, 10 May, 3:00pm	Thomas Gibson Park	Taylor Cleveland
Corrimal Cougars	10 – 54	Western Suburbs Red Devils	Saturday, 10 May, 3:00pm	Ziems Park	Michael Chin
Round 4
Dapto Canaries	14 – 46	Collegians Collie Dogs	Saturday, 17 May, 3:00pm	Dapto Showground	Luke Mungovan
Thirroul Butchers	18 – 12	Corrimal Cougars	Saturday, 17 May, 3:00pm	Thomas Gibson Park	Tyler Hindle
De La Salle Caringbah	0 – 12	Western Suburbs Red Devils	Saturday, 17 May, 5:10pm	Sharks Stadium	Cameron Hutchinson
Round 5
De La Salle Caringbah	0 – 36	Corrimal Cougars	Saturday, 12 July, 3:00pm	Captain Cook Oval	TBA
Collegians Collie Dogs	40 – 12	Thirroul Butchers	Saturday, 12 July, 3:00pm	Collegians Sports Stadium	Taylor Cleveland
Western Suburbs Red Devils	22 – 6	Dapto Canaries	Saturday, 12 July, 3:00pm	Sid Parish Park	Michael Chin
Round 6
Dapto Canaries	38 – 10	Corrimal Cougars	Saturday, 31 May, 3:00pm	Dapto Showground	Michael Chin
Western Suburbs Red Devils	14 – 10	Collegians Collie Dogs	Saturday, 31 May, 3:00pm	Sid Parish Park	Luke Mungovan
Thirroul Butchers	18 – 22	De La Salle Caringbah	Saturday, 31 May, 3:00pm	Thomas Gibson Park	Taylor Cleveland
Round 7
Dapto Canaries	46 – 18	De La Salle Caringbah	Saturday, 14 June, 3:00pm	Dapto Showground	Michael Chin
Thirroul Butchers	10 – 20	Western Suburbs Red Devils	Saturday, 14 June, 3:00pm	Thomas Gibson Park	William Damato
Corrimal Cougars	12 – 38	Collegians Collie Dogs	Saturday, 14 June, 3:00pm	Ziems Park	Taylor Cleveland
Round 8
Dapto Canaries	26 – 18	Thirroul Butchers	Saturday, 21 June, 3:00pm	Dapto Showground	Luke Mungovan
Western Suburbs Red Devils	14 – 26	Corrimal Cougars	Saturday, 21 June, 3:00pm	Sid Parish Park	Michael Chin
Collegians Collie Dogs	15* – 0	De La Salle Caringbah	N/A
Round 9
Collegians Collie Dogs	42 – 10	Dapto Canaries	Saturday, 28 June, 3:00pm	Collegians Sports Stadium	William Damato
Western Suburbs Red Devils	18 – 24	De La Salle Caringbah	Saturday, 28 June, 3:00pm	Sid Parish Park	Taylor Cleveland
Corrimal Cougars	24 – 22	Thirroul Butchers	Sunday, 29 June, 3:00pm	Ziems Park	Luke Mungovan
Round 10
Western Suburbs Red Devils	14 – 24	Dapto Canaries	Saturday, 5 July, 3:00pm	Sid Parish Park	Taylor Cleveland
Thirroul Butchers	38 – 24	Collegians Collie Dogs	Saturday, 5 July, 3:00pm	Thomas Gibson Park	William Damato
Corrimal Cougars	20 – 54	De La Salle Caringbah	Sunday, 6 July, 3:00pm	Ziems Park	Luke Mungovan
Round 11
De La Salle Caringbah	17 – 16	Thirroul Butchers	Saturday, 19 July, 3:00pm	Captain Cook Oval	Alexander Pruscino
Collegians Collie Dogs	34 – 16	Western Suburbs Red Devils	Saturday, 19 July, 3:00pm	Collegians Sports Stadium	William Damato
Corrimal Cougars	12 – 32	Dapto Canaries	Sunday, 20 July, 3:00pm	Ziems Park	Luke Mungovan
Round 12
De La Salle Caringbah	4 – 18	Dapto Canaries	Saturday, 26 July, 12:30pm	Henson Park	Cameron Hutchinson
Collegians Collie Dogs	34 – 8	Corrimal Cougars	Saturday, 26 July, 3:00pm	Collegians Sports Stadium	Taylor Cleveland
Western Suburbs Red Devils	28 – 12	Thirroul Butchers	Sunday, 27 July, 3:00pm	Sid Parish Park	Luke Mungovan
Round 13
Corrimal Cougars	8 – 0	Western Suburbs Red Devils	Saturday, 2 August, 3:00pm	Mount Kembla Park	William Damato
De La Salle Caringbah	6 – 32	Collegians Collie Dogs	Sunday, 3 August, 2:30pm	Noel Mulligan Oval	TBA
Thirroul Butchers	12 – 14	Dapto Canaries	Sunday, 3 August, 3:00pm	Reed Park	Michael Chin
Round 14
Western Suburbs Red Devils	34 – 6	De La Salle Caringbah	Saturday, 9 August, 3:00pm	Sid Parish Park	Taylor Cleveland
Thirroul Butchers	16 – 14	Corrimal Cougars	Saturday, 9 August, 3:00pm	Thomas Gibson Park	Michael Chin
Dapto Canaries	14 – 22	Collegians Collie Dogs	Sunday, 10 August, 3:00pm	Dapto Showground	William Damato
Round 15
De La Salle Caringbah	12 – 40	Corrimal Cougars	Saturday, 16 August, 3:00pm	Captain Cook Oval	William Damato
Collegians Collie Dogs	24 – 12	Thirroul Butchers	Saturday, 16 August, 3:00pm	Collegians Sports Stadium	Luke Mungovan
Dapto Canaries	4 – 14	Western Suburbs Red Devils	Saturday, 16 August, 3:00pm	Dapto Showground	Taylor Cleveland
Finals Series
Qualifying & Elimination Finals
De La Salle Caringbah	34 – 22	Corrimal Cougars	Saturday, 23 August, 11:00am	HE Laybutt Sporting Complex	William Damato
Western Suburbs Red Devils	24 – 22	Dapto Canaries	Saturday, 23 August, 1:00pm	HE Laybutt Sporting Complex	Taylor Cleveland
Major & Minor Semi-Finals
Dapto Canaries	44 – 10	De La Salle Caringbah	Saturday, 30 August, 1:00pm	Collegians Sports Stadium	Luke Mungovan
Collegians Collie Dogs	0 – 32	Western Suburbs Red Devils	Saturday, 30 August, 3:00pm	Collegians Sports Stadium	Taylor Cleveland
Preliminary Final
Collegians Collie Dogs	40 – 10	Dapto Canaries	Saturday, 6 September, 3:00pm	Collegians Sports Stadium	Taylor Cleveland
Grand Final
Western Suburbs Red Devils	14 – 8	Collegians Collie Dogs	Saturday, 13 September, 3:00pm	WIN Stadium	Taylor Cleveland

==== Grand Final ====
Qualifying & Elimination Finals
2	Western Suburbs	24
3	Dapto	22
4	De La Salle	34
5	Corrimal	22

Major Semi-Final
1	Collegians	0
2	Western Suburbs	32
Minor Semi-Final
3	Dapto	44
4	De La Salle	10

Preliminary Final
1	Collegians	40
3	Dapto	10

Grand Final
2	Western Suburbs	14
1	Collegians	8

2025 Harrigan Cup Grand Final

Saturday, 13 September 2025
3:00pm

Western Suburbs Red Devils	14 – 8	Collegians Collie Dogs
Tries: Joseph Dixon (21') 1 Dane Chisholm (83') 1 Goals: Clay Baldock 3/3 (23', 37'p, 85')	1st: 8 – 0; 2nd: 0 – 8 ET: 6 – 0	Tries: 1 (70') Nic Hall; Goals: 1/1 Callum Gromek (71'); 1/1 Blair Grant (80'p)

WIN Stadium, Wollongong
Referee: Taylor Cleveland
Touch judges: Amelia Sheppard & Darren Van de Moosdyk
Player of the Match: Dane Chisholm

Team details
Western Suburbs		Position	Collegians
Name	Number	Position	Number	Name
Clay Baldock	1	Fullback	1	Callum Gromek
Lachlan Hurst	2	Wing	2	James Lee
George Jennings	3	Centre	3	Nic Hall
Tautau Moga (c)	4	Centre	4	Dane Nelson
Colby Pellow	5	Wing	5	Jay Watling
Justin Rodrigues	6	Five eighth	6	Zach Herring
Dane Chisholm (c)	7	Half back	7	Blair Grant
Luke Chalker	8	Prop forward	8	Joshua Dowel
Joseph Dickson	9	Hooker	9	Dextar Grant
CJ MeafoU	16	Prop forward	10	Blake Dowel
Levi Pascoe	11	Second row	11	Charly Runciman
Phoenix Vetenibua-Finnerty	12	Second row	12	Duke Grant
Tristan Alvarado	17	Lock forward	13	Blake Phillips (c)
Tepai Moeroa	10	Interchange	14	Declan Purcell
Dylan Palmer-Quigg	13	Interchange	15	Tex Anderson
Dylan Lauri	15	Interchange	16	Clive Brett
Jy Hitchcox	19	Interchange	17	Dilan Asanoski
		Reserve	18	Kane Watling
Dane Chisholm		Coach		Jimmy Grehan

== Tier 3 Competitions ==
=== Sydney Shield ===
The Sydney Shield is a third tier men's Rugby League competition in New South Wales. It is the reserve semi-professional competition in Sydney and acts as a feeder competition into the Ron Massey Cup.

==== Teams ====
There are 10 teams confirmed for the 2025 competition. 9 of them are reserve sides of Ron Massey Cup clubs, with the remaining team being an affiliated standalone club.

The only change from 2024 is due to Cabramatta joining the Ron Massey Cup, their reserve side will play in the Shield.

Following Round 2, Cabramatta Leagues Club announced that it was pulling funding from the Two Blues, forcing the Two Blues to exit the competition.

Colours	Club	NSW Cup/RMC Affiliate	Home ground(s)	Head coach
	Cabramatta Two Blues (R)		New Era Stadium	TBA
	Glebe Dirty Reds (R)		Wentworth Park	Mick Golden
	Hills District Bulls (R)		Crestwood Reserve	TBA
	Manly Warringah Sea Eagles (C)		Sydney Academy of Sport, 4 Pines Park	TBA
	Moorebank Rams	Canterbury-Bankstown Bulldogs	Hammondville Oval	TBA
	Mount Pritchard Mounties (R)		Aubrey Keech Reserve	Grant Mitchell
	Penrith Brothers (R)		Parker Street Reserve	TBA
	Ryde-Eastwood Hawks (R)		TG Milner Field	TBA
	St Marys Saints (R)		St Marys Leagues Stadium	TBA
	Wentworthville Magpies (R)		Ringrose Park	TBA

State Map	Local Area
Home Venues	Home Venues

==== Ladder ====
Pos	Team	Pld	W	D	L	B	PF	PA	PD	Pts	Qualification
1	Wentworthville Magpies (R)	16	12	1	3	4	508	300	+208	33	Minor Premiers & Major Semi-Final
2	Manly Warringah Sea Eagles (C)	16	10	0	6	4	446	380	+66	28	Qualifying Final
3	St Marys Saints (R)	16	9	0	7	4	539	383	+156	26	Qualifying Final
4	Mount Pritchard Mounties (R)	16	9	0	7	4	528	373	+155	26	Elimination Final
5	Hills District Bulls (R)	16	8	1	7	4	434	376	+58	25	Elimination Final
6	Penrith Brothers (R)	16	7	0	9	4	362	388	–26	22	
7	Ryde-Eastwood Hawks (R)	16	7	0	9	4	407	478	–71	22	
8	Glebe Dirty Reds (R)	16	7	0	9	4	346	466	-120	22	
9	Moorebank Rams	16	2	0	14	4	306	732	-426	12	

Updated to match(es) played on 1 September. Source:
Rules for classification: 1) points; 2) point difference; 3) points scored

===== Ladder progression =====
- Numbers highlighted in green indicate that the team finished the round inside the top 5.
- Numbers highlighted in blue indicates the team finished first on the ladder in that round.
- Numbers highlighted in red indicates the team finished last place on the ladder in that round.
- Underlined numbers indicate that the team had a bye during that round.

Pos	Team	1	2	4	5	7	8	9	10	3	11	12	13	6	14	15	16	17	18	19	20
1	Wentworthville Magpies (R)	2	4	6	8	13	15	17	17	17	17	17	19	19	21	23	25	27	29	31	33
2	Manly Warringah Sea Eagles (C)	0	2	4	6	8	10	12	14	14	16	18	18	20	22	22	22	24	24	26	28
3	St Marys Saints (R)	2	4	6	6	10	10	12	12	12	14	14	16	16	16	16	18	20	22	24	26
4	Mount Pritchard Mounties (R)	2	2	4	4	6	8	10	12	12	14	16	18	18	20	22	24	24	26	26	26
5	Hills District Bulls (R)	2	2	4	6	9	11	11	13	15	15	17	19	19	21	21	21	21	23	25	25
6	Penrith Brothers (R)	2	2	2	2	4	4	4	4	4	4	6	8	8	10	12	14	16	18	20	22
7	Ryde-Eastwood Hawks (R)	0	0	0	2	4	6	8	8	8	10	10	12	12	14	14	16	18	20	20	22
8	Glebe Dirty Reds (R)	0	2	2	4	8	8	10	12	12	14	16	18	18	18	20	20	20	20	22	22
9	Moorebank Rams	0	2	2	2	2	2	2	4	4	4	4	4	4	6	8	8	8	10	12	12

- Following Round 7, the standings were amended to officially remove Cabramatta and award their matches as byes.

Season Results:

Home	Score	Away	Match Information
Home	Score	Away	Date and Time	Venue	Referee	Video
Round 1
Manly Warringah Sea Eagles (C)	32 – 34	St Marys Saints (R)	Saturday, 15 March, 12:00pm	St Marys Leagues Stadium	Billy Greatbatch
Mount Pritchard Mounties (R)	12 – 38*	Cabramatta Two Blues (R)	Saturday, 15 March, 1:00pm	Aubrey Keech Reserve	Louis Matheson
Wentworthville Magpies (R)	43 – 10	Ryde-Eastwood Hawks (R)	Saturday, 15 March, 2:00pm	Ringrose Park	Gage Miles
Moorebank Rams	6 – 50	Penrith Brothers (R)	Saturday, 15 March, 5:30pm	Hammondville Oval	Cameron Turner
Glebe Dirty Reds (R)	28 – 30	Hills District Bulls (R)	Sunday, 16 March, 12:00pm	Wentworth Park	Blake Williams
Mount Pritchard Mounties (R)		BYE
Round 2
Mount Pritchard Mounties (R)	18 – 32	St Marys Saints (R)	Saturday, 22 March, 1:00pm	Aubrey Keech Reserve	Blake Williams
Ryde-Eastwood Hawks (R)	14 – 22	Glebe Dirty Reds (R)	Saturday, 22 March, 1:00pm	TG Milner Field	Karra-Lee Nolan
Wentworthville Magpies (R)	24 – 14	Penrith Brothers (R)	Saturday, 22 March, 2:00pm	Ringrose Park	Billy Greatbatch
Cabramatta Two Blues (R)	46* – 8	Moorebank Rams	Saturday, 22 March, 3:00pm	New Era Stadium	Gage Miles
Manly Warringah Sea Eagles (C)	24 – 18	Hills District Bulls (R)	Saturday, 22 March, 3:00pm	Sydney Academy of Sport	Louis Matheson
Moorebank Rams		BYE
Round 3
Glebe Dirty Reds (R)	12 – 54	St Marys Saints (R)	Sunday, 30 March, 12:00pm	Wentworth Park	Cameron Turner
Moorebank Rams	10 – 48	Mount Pritchard Mounties (R)	Thursday, 17 April, 6:00pm	Hammondville Oval	Billy Greatbatch
Manly Warringah Sea Eagles (C)	46 – 28	Penrith Brothers (R)	Friday, 16 May, 8:00pm	4 Pines Park	Nathan Loveday
Ryde-Eastwood Hawks (R)	24 – 30	Hills District Bulls (R)	Saturday, 7 June, 12:00pm	TG Milner Field	Brendan Mani
Wentworthville Magpies (R)		BYE
Round 4
Mount Pritchard Mounties (R)	40 – 24	Ryde-Eastwood Hawks (R)	Saturday, 5 April, 1:00pm	Aubrey Keech Reserve	Martin Jones
Penrith Brothers (R)	22 – 26	St Marys Saints (R)	Saturday, 5 April, 4:00pm	Parker Street Reserve	Billy Greatbatch
Moorebank Rams	14 – 70	Hills District Bulls (R)	Saturday, 5 April, 4:30pm	Hammondville Oval	Karra-Lee Nolan
Glebe Dirty Reds (R)	0 – 60	Wentworthville Magpies (R)	Sunday, 6 April, 12:00pm	Wentworth Park	Louis Matheson
Manly Warringah Sea Eagles (C)		BYE
Round 5
Manly Warringah Sea Eagles (C)	30 – 28	Mount Pritchard Mounties (R)	Friday, 11 April, 6:30pm	Sydney Academy of Sport	Billy Greatbatch
Wentworthville Magpies (R)	28 – 26	St Marys Saints (R)	Saturday, 12 April, 11:00am	Lidcombe Oval	Martin Jones
Penrith Brothers (R)	14 – 34	Glebe Dirty Reds (R)	Saturday, 12 April, 3:00pm	Parker Street Reserve	Karra-Lee Nolan
Ryde-Eastwood Hawks (R)	44 – 16	Moorebank Rams	Sunday, 13 April, 1:00pm	TG Milner Field	Louis Matheson
Hills District Bulls (R)		BYE
Round 6 (ANZAC Round)
Mount Pritchard Mounties (R)	14 – 16	Glebe Dirty Reds (R)	Thursday, 24 April, 6:00pm	Aubrey Keech Reserve	Gage Miles
Moorebank Rams	14 – 48	St Marys Saints (R)	Saturday, 26 April, 4:00pm	Hammondville Oval	Louis Matheson
Hills District Bulls (R)	22 – 22	Wentworthville Magpies (R)	Sunday, 27 April, 1:00pm	Crestwood Reserve	Billy Greatbatch
Manly Warringah Sea Eagles (C)	22 – 12	Ryde-Eastwood Hawks (R)	Saturday, 5 July, 1:45pm	Sydney Academy of Sport	Adam Sirianni
Penrith Brothers (R)		BYE
Round 7
Mount Pritchard Mounties (R)	18 – 27	Wentworthville Magpies (R)	Saturday, 3 May, 1:00pm	Aubrey Keech Reserve	Karra-Lee Nolan
St Marys Saints (R)	18 – 22	Hills District Bulls (R)	Saturday, 3 May, 2:00pm	St Marys Leagues Stadium	Martin Jones
Penrith Brothers (R)	18 – 38	Ryde-Eastwood Hawks (R)	Saturday, 3 May, 3:00pm	Parker Street Reserve	Gage Miles
Manly Warringah Sea Eagles (C)	52 – 6	Moorebank Rams	Sunday, 4 May, 1:45pm	Sydney Academy of Sport	Billy Greatbatch
Glebe Dirty Reds (R)		BYE
Round 8
St Marys Saints (R)	36 – 37	Ryde-Eastwood Hawks (R)	Saturday, 10 May, 1:00pm	St Marys Leagues Stadium	Martin Jones
Glebe Dirty Reds (R)	20 – 22	Manly Warringah Sea Eagles (C)	Sunday, 11 May, 11:00am	Wentworth Park	Ethan Klein
Wentworthville Magpies (R)	60 – 6	Moorebank Rams	Sunday, 11 May, 12:00pm	Ringrose Park	Blake Williams
Hills District Bulls (R)	22 – 8	Penrith Brothers (R)	Sunday, 11 May, 1:00pm	Crestwood Reserve	Louis Matheson
Mount Pritchard Mounties (R)		BYE
Round 9
Penrith Brothers (R)	10 – 28	Wentworthville Magpies (R)	Saturday, 24 May, 1:00pm	Ringrose Park	Martin Jones
Glebe Dirty Reds (R)	50 – 28	Moorebank Rams	Sunday, 25 May, 12:00pm	Wentworth Park	Billy Greatbatch
Mount Pritchard Mounties (R)	58 – 16	Hills District Bulls (R)	Sunday, 25 May, 1:00pm	Aubrey Keech Reserve	Louis Matheson
St Marys Saints (R)	24 – 16	Manly Warringah Sea Eagles (C)	Sunday, 25 May, 1:00pm	St Marys Leagues Stadium	Karra-Lee Nolan
Ryde-Eastwood Hawks (R)		BYE
Round 10
St Marys Saints (R)	30 – 36	Glebe Dirty Reds (R)	Saturday, 31 May, 2:00pm	St Marys Leagues Stadium	Brayden Hunt
Penrith Brothers (R)	24 – 46	Mount Pritchard Mounties (R)	Saturday, 31 May, 3:00pm	Aubrey Keech Reserve	Louis Matheson
Hills District Bulls (R)	48 – 20	Ryde-Eastwood Hawks (R)	Sunday, 1 June, 1:00pm	Crestwood Reserve	Gage Miles
Manly Warringah Sea Eagles (C)	34 – 24	Wentworthville Magpies (R)	Sunday, 1 June, 1:40pm	4 Pines Park	Blake Williams
Moorebank Rams		BYE
Round 11
Penrith Brothers (R)	8 – 22	Manly Warringah Sea Eagles (C)	Saturday, 14 June, 3:00pm	Parker Street Reserve	Martin Jones
Mount Pritchard Mounties (R)	50 – 20	Moorebank Rams	Sunday, 15 June, 11:00am	North Sydney Oval	Billy Greatbatch
Ryde-Eastwood Hawks (R)	42 – 24	Wentworthville Magpies (R)	Sunday, 15 June, 12:30pm	TG Milner Field	Karra-Lee Nolan
Hills District Bulls (R)	12 – 26	Glebe Dirty Reds (R)	Sunday, 15 June, 1:00pm	Crestwood Reserve	Brendan Mani
St Marys Saints (R)		BYE
Round 12
St Marys Saints (R)	22 – 26	Penrith Brothers (R)	Saturday, 21 June, 1:00pm	St Marys Leagues Stadium	Tom Stindl
Ryde-Eastwood Hawks (R)	18 – 48	Mount Pritchard Mounties (R)	Sunday, 22 June, 12:30pm	TG Milner Field	Adam Sirianni
Wentworthville Magpies (R)	12 – 26	Glebe Dirty Reds (R)	Sunday, 22 June, 1:00pm	Ringrose Park	Blake Williams
Hills District Bulls (R)	36 – 34	Moorebank Rams	Sunday, 22 June, 1:00pm	Crestwood Reserve	Louis Matheson
Manly Warringah Sea Eagles (C)		BYE
Round 13
Ryde-Eastwood Hawks (R)	32 – 28	Manly Warringah Sea Eagles (C)	Saturday, 28 June, 12:00pm	TG Milner Field	Billy Greatbatch
Penrith Brothers (R)	38 – 28	Moorebank Rams	Saturday, 28 June, 3:00pm	Parker Street Reserve	Gage Miles
Glebe Dirty Reds (R)	BYE	Mount Pritchard Mounties (R)
St Marys Saints (R)	BYE	Wentworthville Magpies (R)
Hills District Bulls (R)	BYE
Round 14
St Marys Saints (R)	30 – 38	Wentworthville Magpies (R)	Saturday, 5 July, 1:00pm	St Marys Leagues Stadium	Louis Matheson
Glebe Dirty Reds (R)	14 – 48	Mount Pritchard Mounties (R)	Saturday, 5 July, 3:00pm	Aubrey Keech Reserve	Billy Greatbatch
Penrith Brothers (R)	BYE	Hills District Bulls (R)
Ryde-Eastwood Hawks (R)	BYE	Moorebank Rams
Manly Warringah Sea Eagles (C)	BYE
Round 15
St Marys Saints (R)	22 – 26	Mount Pritchard Mounties (R)	Saturday, 12 July, 1:00pm	St Marys Leagues Stadium	Brandan Mani
Moorebank Rams	40 – 32	Manly Warringah Sea Eagles (C)	Saturday, 12 July, 4:00pm	Hammondville Oval	Nathan Loveday
Ryde-Eastwood Hawks (R)	12 – 19	Penrith Brothers (R)	Sunday, 13 July, 12:30pm	TG Milner Field	Adam Sirianni
Wentworthville Magpies (R)	26 – 12	Hills District Bulls (R)	Sunday, 13 July, 1:00pm	Ringrose Park	Blake Williams
Glebe Dirty Reds (R)		BYE
Round 16
Mount Pritchard Mounties (R)	48 – 22	Manly Warringah Sea Eagles (C)	Saturday, 19 July, 1:00pm	Aubrey Keech Reserve	Mitchell Pitscheider
Moorebank Rams	26 – 30	Ryde-Eastwood Hawks (R)	Sunday, 20 July, 11:00am	Hammondville Oval	Blake Williams
Glebe Dirty Reds (R)	12 – 36	Penrith Brothers (R)	Sunday, 20 July, 12:00pm	Wentworth Park	Adam Sirianni
Hills District Bulls (R)	28 – 29	St Marys Saints (R)	Sunday, 20 July, 1:00pm	Crestwood Reserve	Gage Miles
Wentworthville Magpies (R)		BYE
Round 17
St Marys Saints (R)	64 – 18	Moorebank Rams	Friday, 25 July, 6:30pm	St Marys Leagues Stadium	Blake Williams
Penrith Brothers (R)	17 – 10	Hills District Bulls (R)	Saturday, 26 July, 3:00pm	Parker Street Reserve	Mitchell Pitscheider
Manly Warringah Sea Eagles (C)	30 – 16	Glebe Dirty Reds (R)	Sunday, 27 July, 11:30am	Sydney Academy of Sport	Adam Sirianni
Wentworthville Magpies (R)	30 – 22	Mount Pritchard Mounties (R)	Sunday, 27 July, 1:00pm	Ringrose Park	Tom Stindl
Ryde-Eastwood Hawks (R)		BYE
Round 18
Wentworthville Magpies (R)	22 – 10	Manly Warringah Sea Eagles (C)	Saturday, 2 August, 4:00pm	Ringrose Park	Gage Miles
Moorebank Rams	22 – 20	Glebe Dirty Reds (R)	Saturday, 9 August, 4:30pm	Hammondville Oval	Blake Williams
Penrith Brothers (R)	BYE	Mount Pritchard Mounties (R)
Hills District Bulls (R)	BYE	St Marys Saints (R)
Ryde-Eastwood Hawks (R)	BYE
Round 19
Ryde-Eastwood Hawks (R)	10 – 44	St Marys Saints (R)	Sunday, 10 August, 12:00pm	St Marys Leagues Stadium	Gage Miles
Hills District Bulls (R)	38 – 4	Mount Pritchard Mounties (R)	Sunday, 10 August, 1:00pm	Crestwood Reserve	Brayden Hunt
Glebe Dirty Reds (R)	BYE	Wentworthville Magpies (R)
Moorebank Rams	BYE	Manly Warringah Sea Eagles (C)
Penrith Brothers (R)	BYE
Round 20
Mount Pritchard Mounties (R)	12 – 30	Penrith Brothers (R)	Saturday, 16 August, 1:00pm	Aubrey Keech Reserve	Brayden Hunt
Moorebank Rams	18 – 40	Wentworthville Magpies (R)	Saturday, 16 August, 4:00pm	Hammondville Oval	Lachlan Greenfield
Glebe Dirty Reds (R)	14 – 40	Ryde-Eastwood Hawks (R)	Sunday, 17 August, 12:00pm	Wentworth Park	Mitchell Pitscheider
Hills District Bulls (R)	20 – 24	Manly Warringah Sea Eagles (C)	Sunday, 17 August, 1:00pm	Crestwood Reserve	Gage Miles
St Marys Saints (R)		BYE
Finals Series
Qualifying & Elimination Finals
Manly Warringah Sea Eagles (C)	10 – 44	St Marys Saints (R)	Saturday, 23 August, 1:00pm	Ringrose Park	Tom Stindl
Mount Pritchard Mounties (R)	34 – 14	Hills District Bulls (R)	Saturday, 23 August, 3:00pm	HE Laybutt Sporting Complex	Ethan Klein
Major & Minor Semi-Finals
Manly Warringah Sea Eagles (C)	52 – 18	Mount Pritchard Mounties (R)	Saturday, 30 August, 11:00am	St Marys Leagues Stadium	Ethan Klein
Wentworthville Magpies (R)	22 – 18	St Marys Saints (R)	Saturday, 30 August, 3:00pm	St Marys Leagues Stadium	Tom Stindl
Preliminary Final
St Marys Saints (R)	18 – 30	Manly Warringah Sea Eagles (C)	Saturday, 6 September, 1:00pm	Leichhardt Oval	Luke Saldern
Grand Final
Wentworthville Magpies (R)	24 – 25	Manly Warringah Sea Eagles (C)	Saturday, 13 September, 1:00pm	Leichhardt Oval	Luke Saldern

==== Grand Final ====
Qualifying & Elimination Finals
2	Manly Warringah	10
3	St Marys	44
4	Mount Pritchard	34
5	Hills District	14

Major Semi-Final
1	Wentworthville	22
3	St Marys	18
Minor Semi-Final
2	Manly Warringah	52
4	Mount Pritchard	18

Preliminary Final
3	St Marys	18
2	Manly Warringah	30

Grand Final
1	Wentworthville	24
2	Manly Warringah	25

2025 Sydney Shield Grand Final

Saturday, 13 September 2025
1:00pm

Wentworthville Magpies (R)	24 – 25	Manly Warringah Sea Eagles (C)
Tries: Elias Abou-Mrad (46', 53') 2 Dermot McKeever-King (8') 1 Denzal Tonise (70') 1 Goals: Darcy Brettle 3/5 (55', 58'p, 72'); Field goals: Darcy Brettle (79' 2p) 1 Sin bin: Liam Davidson (67')	1st: 4 – 16; 2nd: 20 – 8 ET: 0 – 0 GP: 0 – 1	Tries: 3 (14', 27', 76') Max Lehmann; 1 (33') Lachlan Burt; 1 (40') Witika Rees-Hatu; Goals: 1/6 Lachlan Burt (77'); 1/1 Tamoko Berryman-Duff (80'p); Field goals: 1 (96') Tamoko Berryman-Duff

Leichhardt Oval, Sydney
Referee: Luke Saldern
Touch judges: Charlie Suters & Benjamin Teague
In Goal judges: John Woods & Liam Nicholls

Team details
Wentworthville		Position	Manly Warringah
Name	Number	Position	Number	Name
Liam Davidson	1	Fullback	1	Max Lehmann
Elias Abou-Mrad	2	Wing	2	Lachlan Burt
Emosi Alamoti	3	Centre	3	Benjamin Keene-O'Keefe
Jabriel Kalache	4	Centre	4	Justin Burt
Dermot McKeever-King	5	Wing	5	Max Davies
Zachary Hunter	6	Five eighth	6	Witika Rees-Hatu
Darcy Brettle	7	Half back	7	Braith Alexander
Will Epere	8	Prop forward	8	Nicholas Bilsborough
Ayden Carling	9	Hooker	9	Jermayne Cook
Atoa Markis	10	Prop forward	10	Samson Mairi
Michael Geddes	11	Second row	11	Khan Symonds-Magee
Benjamin Dooley	12	Second row	12	Lachoneus Paki
Denzal Tonise	13	Lock forward	13	Heath Turner
Robbie Graham	14	Interchange	15	Beau McKee
Daniel Readon	18	Interchange	17	Lachlan Armstrong
Oliver Scott	20	Interchange	20	Tamoko Berryman-Duff
Kye Simsic	22	Interchange	21	Beniel Qereqeretabua
Joshua Hey	21	Reserve	14	Wiremu Tibbutt
Jason Pettit-Young		Coach		Frank McKee
https://www.nswrl.com.au/draw/sydney-shield/2025/grand-final/game-1/teamlist/

== Under 21s ==
=== Jersey Flegg Cup ===
The Jersey Flegg Cup is the premier under 21's Rugby League competition in New South Wales. It feeds into the New South Wales Cup.

==== Teams ====
The 14 teams that competed in 2024 will again compete in 2025.

Colours	Club	NSW Cup Affiliate	Home ground(s)	Head coach
	Canberra Raiders (U21s)		GIO Stadium, Raiders Belconnen	Jordan Macey
	Canterbury-Bankstown Bulldogs (U21s)		Belmore Sports Ground, Hammondville Oval	Josh Jackson
	Cronulla-Sutherland Sharks (U21s)		Sharks Stadium	Andrew Dallalana
	Kaiviti Silktails (U21s)	Sydney Roosters	Churchill Park, King Charles Park	Timoce Duve
	Manly Warringah Sea Eagles (U21s)		4 Pines Park	Anthony Watmough
	Melbourne Storm (U21s)		Seabrook Reserve, AAMI Park	Mark Russell
	New Zealand Warriors (U21s)		Go Media Stadium, North Harbour Stadium	Grant Pocklington
	Newcastle Knights (U21s)		McDonald Jones Stadium	Alex Moore
	Parramatta Eels (U21s)		Eric Tweedale Stadium, New Era Stadium, Kellyville Park	Jordan Rankin
	Penrith Panthers (U21s)		St Marys Leagues Stadium, Parker Street Reserve	Jono Rolfe
	South Sydney Rabbitohs (U21s)		Redfern Oval	Scott Kenna
	St George Illawarra Dragons (U21s)		Collegians Sporting Complex, WIN Stadium, OKI Jubilee Stadium	Shane Millard
	Sydney Roosters (U21s)		Wentworth Park	Dean Feeney
	Wests Tigers (U21s)		Lidcombe Oval, Campbelltown Sports Stadium, Leichhardt Oval	Leon Latulipe

State Map	Sydney Map
Home Venues	Home Venues

==== Ladder ====
Pos	Team	Pld	W	D	L	B	PF	PA	PD	Pts	Qualification
1	Melbourne Storm (U21s)	24	17	1	6	2	824	480	+344	39	Minor Premiers & Major Semi-Final
2	Cronulla-Sutherland Sharks (U21s)	24	17	0	7	2	674	542	+132	38	Qualifying Final
3	Canberra Raiders (U21s)	24	16	1	7	2	742	549	+195	37	Qualifying Final
4	Penrith Panthers (U21s)	24	16	0	8	2	809	538	+271	36	Elimination Final
5	Parramatta Eels (U21s)	24	16	0	8	2	702	570	+132	36	Elimination Final
6	Canterbury-Bankstown Bulldogs (U21s)	24	13	1	10	2	646	563	+83	31	
7	Wests Tigers (U21s)	24	12	2	10	2	699	670	+29	30	
8	New Zealand Warriors (U21s)	24	10	3	11	2	574	698	-124	27	
9	Sydney Roosters (U21s)	24	11	0	13	2	610	646	–36	26	
10	Newcastle Knights (U21s)	24	9	3	12	2	604	590	+14	25	
11	St George Illawarra Dragons (U21s)	24	8	4	12	2	650	641	+9	24	
12	South Sydney Rabbitohs (U21s)	24	5	1	18	2	454	718	-264	15	
13	Manly Warringah Sea Eagles (U21s)	24	5	1	18	2	448	840	-392	15	
14	Kaiviti Silktails (U21s)	24	4	1	19	2	383	762	-379	13	

Updated to match(es) played on 1 September. Source:
Rules for classification: 1) points; 2) point difference; 3) points scored

===== Ladder progression =====
- Numbers highlighted in green indicate that the team finished the round inside the top 5.
- Numbers highlighted in blue indicates the team finished first on the ladder in that round.
- Numbers highlighted in red indicates the team finished last place on the ladder in that round.
- Underlined numbers indicate that the team had a bye during that round.

Pos	Team	1	2	3	5	6	7	8	9	10	4	11	12	13	14	15	16	17	18	19	20	21	23	24	25	22	26
1	Melbourne Storm (U21s)	2	4	6	9	11	11	13	15	15	15	17	19	21	23	23	25	27	29	31	33	35	35	37	39	39	39
2	Cronulla-Sutherland Sharks (U21s)	0	2	4	6	8	10	12	14	16	16	18	20	20	22	24	24	26	26	28	28	30	34	34	36	36	38
3	Canberra Raiders (U21s)	2	4	6	8	8	10	10	12	14	14	16	18	20	22	24	26	27	27	29	29	31	31	33	35	35	37
4	Penrith Panthers (U21s)	2	4	6	8	10	12	14	14	16	16	18	18	18	18	20	22	24	26	28	28	30	32	34	36	36	36
5	Parramatta Eels (U21s)	2	2	4	6	8	10	12	12	12	14	16	18	20	22	22	22	22	24	24	26	28	32	34	34	34	36
6	Canterbury-Bankstown Bulldogs (U21s)	2	2	2	6	8	8	8	10	12	12	14	14	16	18	20	20	20	21	21	23	25	27	27	29	29	31
7	Wests Tigers (U21s)	0	2	2	5	7	7	7	7	7	7	9	11	13	13	15	16	16	18	18	20	22	26	28	28	28	30
8	New Zealand Warriors (U21s)	0	0	0	3	3	5	6	6	6	6	8	10	12	12	14	14	16	18	20	20	22	22	22	24	25	27
9	Sydney Roosters (U21s)	0	0	2	2	4	4	6	6	8	8	10	10	10	10	12	14	16	16	18	20	22	24	24	26	26	26
10	Newcastle Knights (U21s)	2	2	2	2	2	2	3	5	7	7	9	11	11	11	11	13	14	15	15	17	19	23	25	25	25	25
11	St George Illawarra Dragons (U21s)	0	2	2	3	3	3	5	7	7	7	9	9	11	13	13	14	16	17	17	19	21	23	23	23	24	24
12	South Sydney Rabbitohs (U21s)	0	0	0	2	2	4	4	4	6	6	8	8	8	8	8	10	10	10	12	12	14	14	14	14	14	15
13	Manly Warringah Sea Eagles (U21s)	2	4	4	4	4	4	4	6	6	6	8	8	8	10	10	10	10	11	11	11	13	15	15	15	15	15
14	Kaiviti Silktails (U21s)	0	0	2	4	4	6	6	6	6	6	8	8	8	8	8	8	8	8	8	8	10	10	12	12	12	13

Season Results:

Home	Score	Away	Match Information
Home	Score	Away	Date and Time	Venue	Referee	Video
Round 1
St George Illawarra Dragons (U21s)	22 – 34	Canterbury-Bankstown Bulldogs (U21s)	Saturday, 8 March, 11:00am	Ziems Park	Adam Sirianni
Penrith Panthers (U21s)	30 – 0	Cronulla-Sutherland Sharks (U21s)	Saturday, 8 March, 12:00pm	Parker Street Reserve	Brandan Mani
Wests Tigers (U21s)	26 – 34	Newcastle Knights (U21s)	Saturday, 8 March, 12:00pm	Lidcombe Oval	Cameron Turner
Canberra Raiders (U21s)	50 – 4	New Zealand Warriors (U21s)	Saturday, 8 March, 12:00pm	Leichhardt Oval	Paul Eden
Kaiviti Silktails (U21s)	6 – 26	Parramatta Eels (U21s)	Saturday, 8 March, 1:00pm	Hammondville Oval	Ethan Klein
Manly Warringah Sea Eagles (U21s)	38 – 8	South Sydney Rabbitohs (U21s)	Saturday, 8 March, 3:45pm	4 Pines Park	Mitchell Pitscheider
Sydney Roosters (U21s)	20 – 28	Melbourne Storm (U21s)	Sunday, 9 March, 1:15pm	Wentworth Park	Dillan Wells
Round 2
Penrith Panthers (U21s)	46 – 16	Sydney Roosters (U21s)	Saturday, 15 March, 10:30am	Parker Street Reserve	Mitchell Pitscheider
St George Illawarra Dragons (U21s)	22 – 18	South Sydney Rabbitohs (U21s)	Saturday, 15 March, 10:30am	Collegians Sporting Complex	Paul Eden
New Zealand Warriors (U21s)	28 – 32	Manly Warringah Sea Eagles (U21s)	Saturday, 15 March, 12:00pm	Navigation Homes Stadium	Jack Feavers
Cronulla-Sutherland Sharks (U21s)	38 – 22	Newcastle Knights (U21s)	Saturday, 15 March, 12:50pm	Henson Park	Harrison Baysarri
Parramatta Eels (U21s)	22 – 26	Wests Tigers (U21s)	Saturday, 15 March, 1:00pm	New Era Stadium	Adam Sirianni
Canterbury-Bankstown Bulldogs (U21s)	20 – 30	Melbourne Storm (U21s)	Saturday, 15 March, 2:00pm	Hammondville Oval	Nathan Loveday
Canberra Raiders (U21s)	40 – 22	Kaiviti Silktails (U21s)	Saturday, 15 March, 5:10pm	GIO Stadium	Brendan Mani
Round 3
Cronulla-Sutherland Sharks (U21s)	28 – 16	South Sydney Rabbitohs (U21s)	Saturday, 22 March, 10:50am	Sharks Stadium	Ryan Micallef
Kaiviti Silktails (U21s)	23 – 22	St George Illawarra Dragons (U21s)	Saturday, 22 March, 12:00pm	King Charles Park	Adam Sirianni
New Zealand Warriors (U21s)	22 – 34	Sydney Roosters (U21s)	Saturday, 22 March, 12:00pm	Navigation Homes Stadium	Jack Feavers
Parramatta Eels (U21s)	20 – 6	Canterbury-Bankstown Bulldogs (U21s)	Saturday, 22 March, 1:00pm	New Era Stadium	Brendan Mani
Newcastle Knights (U21s)	18 – 50	Penrith Panthers (U21s)	Saturday, 22 March, 2:30pm	Lakeside Sporting Complex	Martin Jones
Melbourne Storm (U21s)	44 – 18	Wests Tigers (U21s)	Saturday, 22 March, 4:00pm	Seabrook Reserve	Paul Eden
Manly Warringah Sea Eagles (U21s)	18 – 44	Canberra Raiders (U21s)	Sunday, 23 March, 2:20pm	4 Pines Park	Nathan Loveday
Round 4
Kaiviti Silktails (U21s)	24 – 22	Newcastle Knights (U21s)	Saturday, 29 March, 12:00pm	Lawaqa Park	Brendan Mani
South Sydney Rabbitohs (U21s)	26 – 30	Penrith Panthers (U21s)	Saturday, 29 March, 1:00pm	Redfern Oval	Adam Sirianni
Canberra Raiders (U21s)	30 – 24	Sydney Roosters (U21s)	Saturday, 29 March, 1:45pm	Raiders Belconnen	Gage Miles
St George Illawarra Dragons (U21s)	26 – 26	Melbourne Storm (U21s)	Saturday, 29 March, 2:00pm	Collegians Sporting Complex	Blake Williams
Cronulla-Sutherland Sharks (U21s)	16 – 18	Canterbury-Bankstown Bulldogs (U21s)	Saturday, 29 March, 5:10pm	Sharks Stadium	Paul Eden
Wests Tigers (U21s)	20 – 20	New Zealand Warriors (U21s)	Sunday, 30 March, 1:30pm	Campbelltown Sports Stadium	Martin Jones
Manly Warringah Sea Eagles (U21s)	16 – 24	Parramatta Eels (U21s)	Friday, 16 May, 6:00pm	4 Pines Park	Lachlan Greenfield
Round 5
Parramatta Eels (U21s)	28 – 16	St George Illawarra Dragons (U21s)	Saturday, 5 April, 11:45am	Eric Tweedale Stadium	Paul Eden
Kaiviti Silktails (U21s)	18 – 28	New Zealand Warriors (U21s)	Saturday, 5 April, 12:00pm	Churchill Park	Gage Miles
Canterbury-Bankstown Bulldogs (U21s)	32 – 28	Newcastle Knights (U21s)	Saturday, 5 April, 1:00pm	Hammondville Oval	Blake Williams
Canberra Raiders (U21s)	18 – 32	Cronulla-Sutherland Sharks (U21s)	Saturday, 5 April, 1:15pm	Raiders Belconnen	Mitchell Pitscheider
Penrith Panthers (U21s)	20 – 30	Melbourne Storm (U21s)	Saturday, 5 April, 2:00pm	Parker Street Reserve	Brendan Mani
Manly Warringah Sea Eagles (U21s)	14 – 38	Wests Tigers (U21s)	Sunday, 6 April, 12:05pm	4 Pines Park	Adam Sirianni
South Sydney Rabbitohs (U21s)	38 – 10	Sydney Roosters (U21s)	Sunday, 6 April, 1:00pm	Redfern Oval	Nathan Loveday
Round 6
Manly Warringah Sea Eagles (U21s)	14 – 46	Penrith Panthers (U21s)	Friday, 11 April, 6:00pm	Parker Street Reserve	Adam Sirianni
New Zealand Warriors (U21s)	22 – 28	Cronulla-Sutherland Sharks (U21s)	Saturday, 12 April, 10:00am	Waitakere Stadium	Jack Feavers
St George Illawarra Dragons (U21s)	16 – 48	Sydney Roosters (U21s)	Saturday, 12 April, 11:15am	Collegians Sporting Complex	Brendan Mani
Canterbury-Bankstown Bulldogs (U21s)	44 – 14	Kaiviti Silktails (U21s)	Saturday, 12 April, 12:30pm	Belmore Sports Ground	Cameron Turner
Parramatta Eels (U21s)	44 – 6	Canberra Raiders (U21s)	Saturday, 12 April, 3:00pm	Lidcombe Oval	Gage Miles
Melbourne Storm (U21s)	40 – 8	South Sydney Rabbitohs (U21s)	Sunday, 13 April, 11:30am	AAMI Park	Mitchell Pitscheider
Newcastle Knights (U21s)	16 – 30	Wests Tigers (U21s)	Sunday, 13 April, 11:40am	McDonald Jones Stadium	Blake Williams
Round 7 (Easter Round)
Canterbury-Bankstown Bulldogs (U21s)	6 – 30	South Sydney Rabbitohs (U21s)	Friday, 18 April, 11:00am	Belmore Sports Ground	Mitchell Pitscheider
Sydney Roosters (U21s)	12 – 40	Penrith Panthers (U21s)	Friday, 18 April, 12:00pm	Mascot Oval	Brendan Mani
Wests Tigers (U21s)	26 – 34	Parramatta Eels (U21s)	Saturday, 19 April, 12:00pm	Lidcombe Oval	Cameron Turner
Melbourne Storm (U21s)	26 – 34	Kaiviti Silktails (U21s)	Saturday, 19 April, 2:00pm	Seabrook Reserve	Blake Williams
New Zealand Warriors (U21s)	36 – 30	St George Illawarra Dragons (U21s)	Saturday, 19 April, 2:50pm	Go Media Stadium	Paki Parkinson
Newcastle Knights (U21s)	28 – 34	Cronulla-Sutherland Sharks (U21s)	Sunday, 20 April, 11:40am	McDonald Jones Stadium	Brayden Hunt
Canberra Raiders (U21s)	56 – 24	Manly Warringah Sea Eagles (U21s)	Sunday, 20 April, 1:00pm	Raiders Belconnen	Gage Miles
Round 8 (ANZAC Round)
Sydney Roosters (U21s)	32 – 10	Kaiviti Silktails (U21s)	Saturday, 26 April, 11:00am	NSWRL Centre of Excellence	Mitchell Pitscheider
St George Illawarra Dragons (U21s)	20 – 14	Manly Warringah Sea Eagles (U21s)	Saturday, 26 April, 11:15am	Collegians Sporting Complex	Adam Sirianni
New Zealand Warriors (U21s)	18 – 18	Newcastle Knights (U21s)	Saturday, 26 April, 11:45am	Waitakere Stadium	Jack Feavers
South Sydney Rabbitohs (U21s)	22 – 32	Parramatta Eels (U21s)	Saturday, 26 April, 12:00pm	Redfern Oval	Blake Williams
Wests Tigers (U21s)	20 – 46	Cronulla-Sutherland Sharks (U21s)	Saturday, 26 April, 12:00pm	Lidcombe Oval	Brendan Mani
Canterbury-Bankstown Bulldogs (U21s)	24 – 25	Penrith Panthers (U21s)	Saturday, 26 April, 12:00pm	Belmore Sports Ground	Clayton Wills
Canberra Raiders (U21s)	14 – 52	Melbourne Storm (U21s)	Saturday, 26 April, 12:15pm	Raiders Belconnen	Cameron Turner
Round 9
Cronulla-Sutherland Sharks (U21s)	30 – 26	Parramatta Eels (U21s)	Saturday, 3 May, 12:50pm	Henson Park	Cameron Turner
Melbourne Storm (U21s)	38 – 12	New Zealand Warriors (U21s)	Saturday, 3 May, 1:30pm	Seabrook Reserve	Adam Sirianni
South Sydney Rabbitohs (U21s)	6 – 42	Newcastle Knights (U21s)	Sunday, 4 May, 10:45am	Redfern Oval	Lachlan Greenfield
Wests Tigers (U21s)	18 – 56	St George Illawarra Dragons (U21s)	Sunday, 4 May, 12:00pm	Lidcombe Oval	Blake Williams
Penrith Panthers (U21s)	12 – 34	Canberra Raiders (U21s)	Sunday, 4 May, 12:00pm	Blacktown International Sports Park	Mitchell Pitscheider
Manly Warringah Sea Eagles (U21s)	24 – 4	Kaiviti Silktails (U21s)	Sunday, 4 May, 12:00pm	Sydney Academy of Sport	Brendan Mani
Sydney Roosters (U21s)	18 – 42	Canterbury-Bankstown Bulldogs (U21s)	Sunday, 4 May, 1:30pm	Wentworth Park	Brayden Hunt
Round 10
Penrith Panthers (U21s)	40 – 20	Wests Tigers (U21s)	Friday, 9 May, 7:00pm	Parker Street Reserve	Ryan Micallef
New Zealand Warriors (U21s)	28 – 32	Canberra Raiders (U21s)	Saturday, 10 May, 12:00pm	Collegians Sporting Complex	Nathan Loveday
Canterbury-Bankstown Bulldogs (U21s)	36 – 10	Parramatta Eels (U21s)	Saturday, 10 May, 12:30pm	Hammondville Oval	Brendan Mani
South Sydney Rabbitohs (U21s)	14 – 6	Kaiviti Silktails (U21s)	Saturday, 10 May, 1:00pm	Redfern Oval	Adam Sirianni
St George Illawarra Dragons (U21s)	18 – 30	Cronulla-Sutherland Sharks (U21s)	Saturday, 10 May, 3:10pm	WIN Stadium	Mitchell Pitscheider
Melbourne Storm (U21s)	26 – 28	Newcastle Knights (U21s)	Sunday, 11 May, 11:30am	AAMI Park	Gage Miles
Sydney Roosters (U21s)	24 – 10	Manly Warringah Sea Eagles (U21s)	Sunday, 11 May, 3:00pm	Wentworth Park	Lachlan Greenfield
Round 11
St George Illawarra Dragons (U21s)	BYE	Newcastle Knights (U21s)
South Sydney Rabbitohs (U21s)	BYE	Sydney Roosters (U21s)
Cronulla-Sutherland Sharks (U21s)	BYE	Melbourne Storm (U21s)
Wests Tigers (U21s)	BYE	Canterbury-Bankstown Bulldogs (U21s)
Parramatta Eels (U21s)	BYE	Penrith Panthers (U21s)
Canberra Raiders (U21s)	BYE	Manly Warringah Sea Eagles (U21s)
Kaiviti Silktails (U21s)	BYE	New Zealand Warriors (U21s)
Round 12
South Sydney Rabbitohs (U21s)	18 – 34	Melbourne Storm (U21s)	Saturday, 24 May, 11:45am	Redfern Oval	Brendan Mani
Kaiviti Silktails (U21s)	18 – 34	Wests Tigers (U21s)	Saturday, 24 May, 12:00pm	Churchill Park	Blake Williams
Parramatta Eels (U21s)	40 – 24	Manly Warringah Sea Eagles (U21s)	Saturday, 24 May, 1:30pm	Kellyville Park	Adam Sirianni
Sydney Roosters (U21s)	18 – 30	Cronulla-Sutherland Sharks (U21s)	Saturday, 24 May, 3:00pm	Industree Group Stadium	Brayden Hunt
New Zealand Warriors (U21s)	40 – 28	Canterbury-Bankstown Bulldogs (U21s)	Sunday, 25 May, 11:00am	Navigation Homes Stadium	Jack Feavers
Penrith Panthers (U21s)	22 – 24	Newcastle Knights (U21s)	Sunday, 25 May, 12:00pm	Blacktown International Sports Park	Nathan Loveday
Canberra Raiders (U21s)	38 – 28	St George Illawarra Dragons (U21s)	Sunday, 25 May, 1:00pm	Seiffert Oval	Gage Miles
Round 13
South Sydney Rabbitohs (U21s)	26 – 30	New Zealand Warriors (U21s)	Saturday, 31 May, 11:15am	Redfern Oval	Salvatore Marigliano
Kaiviti Silktails (U21s)	14 – 18	Canterbury-Bankstown Bulldogs (U21s)	Saturday, 31 May, 12:00pm	Churchill Park	Nathan Loveday
Penrith Panthers (U21s)	16 – 36	Parramatta Eels (U21s)	Saturday, 31 May, 12:00pm	St Marys Leagues Stadium	Mitchell Pitscheider
Cronulla-Sutherland Sharks (U21s)	18 – 30	Wests Tigers (U21s)	Saturday, 31 May, 12:50pm	Henson Park	Lachlan Greenfield
St George Illawarra Dragons (U21s)	36 – 26	Newcastle Knights (U21s)	Saturday, 31 May, 1:00pm	Collegians Sporting Complex	Brendan Mani
Manly Warringah Sea Eagles (U21s)	12 – 52	Melbourne Storm (U21s)	Sunday, 1 June, 12:00pm	4 Pines Park	Harrison Baysarri
Sydney Roosters (U21s)	28 – 30	Canberra Raiders (U21s)	Sunday, 1 June, 12:00pm	Wentworth Park	Adam Sirianni
Round 14
Melbourne Storm (U21s)	32 – 16	Penrith Panthers (U21s)	Friday, 6 June, 3:30pm	AAMI Park	Mitchell Pitscheider
Canterbury-Bankstown Bulldogs (U21s)	38 – 10	Wests Tigers (U21s)	Friday, 6 June, 7:00pm	Belmore Sports Ground	Blake Williams
Newcastle Knights (U21s)	18 – 24	Manly Warringah Sea Eagles (U21s)	Saturday, 7 June, 1:00pm	Newcastle Centre of Excellence	Louis Matheson
Canberra Raiders (U21s)	38 – 22	South Sydney Rabbitohs (U21s)	Saturday, 7 June, 2:00pm	Raiders Belconnen	Liam Richardson
St George Illawarra Dragons (U21s)	46 – 10	Kaiviti Silktails (U21s)	Saturday, 7 June, 2:00pm	Collegians Sporting Complex	Salvatore Marigliano
Cronulla-Sutherland Sharks (U21s)	38 – 28	New Zealand Warriors (U21s)	Saturday, 7 June, 3:05pm	Sharks Stadium	Adam Sirianni
Parramatta Eels (U21s)	44 – 36	Sydney Roosters (U21s)	Sunday, 8 June, 1:00pm	Kellyville Park	Michael Ford
Round 15
Cronulla-Sutherland Sharks (U21s)	46 – 10	Kaiviti Silktails (U21s)	Thursday, 12 June, 5:35pm	Sharks Stadium	Adam Sirianni
Parramatta Eels (U21s)	20 – 32	New Zealand Warriors (U21s)	Saturday, 14 June, 11:00am	Kellyville Park	Salvatore Marigliano
St George Illawarra Dragons (U21s)	30 – 40	Penrith Panthers (U21s)	Saturday, 14 June, 11:15am	Collegians Sporting Complex	Blake Williams
Melbourne Storm (U21s)	4 – 46	Canberra Raiders (U21s)	Saturday, 14 June, 11:30am	Seabrook Reserve	Gage Miles
Wests Tigers (U21s)	58 – 10	Manly Warringah Sea Eagles (U21s)	Saturday, 14 June, 12:00pm	Lidcombe Oval	Mitchell Pitscheider
Newcastle Knights (U21s)	28 – 30	Sydney Roosters (U21s)	Saturday, 14 June, 1:15pm	McDonald Jones Stadium	Louis Matheson
South Sydney Rabbitohs (U21s)	30 – 34	Canterbury-Bankstown Bulldogs (U21s)	Saturday, 14 June, 2:30pm	Redfern Oval	Liam Richardson
Round 16
St George Illawarra Dragons (U21s)	34 – 34	Wests Tigers (U21s)	Saturday, 21 June, 11:15am	Collegians Sporting Complex	Ryan Micallef
Kaiviti Silktails (U21s)	22 – 28	Sydney Roosters (U21s)	Saturday, 21 June, 12:00pm	Churchill Park	Salvatore Marigliano
New Zealand Warriors (U21s)	14 – 40	Penrith Panthers (U21s)	Saturday, 21 June, 12:20pm	Go Media Stadium	Jack Feavers
Parramatta Eels (U21s)	22 – 26	Newcastle Knights (U21s)	Saturday, 21 June, 1:00pm	Kellyville Park	Brendan Mani
Canterbury-Bankstown Bulldogs (U21s)	16 – 24	Canberra Raiders (U21s)	Saturday, 21 June, 1:45pm	Belmore Sports Ground	Liam Richardson
Melbourne Storm (U21s)	42 – 18	Cronulla-Sutherland Sharks (U21s)	Saturday, 21 June, 2:00pm	Seabrook Reserve	Mitchell Pitscheider
South Sydney Rabbitohs (U21s)	24 – 4	Manly Warringah Sea Eagles (U21s)	Saturday, 21 June, 3:25pm	Accor Stadium	Harrison Baysarri
Round 17
Kaiviti Silktails (U21s)	14 – 36	Melbourne Storm (U21s)	Friday, 27 June, 3:00pm	Lawaqa Park	Nathan Loveday
Penrith Panthers (U21s)	42 – 26	Canterbury-Bankstown Bulldogs (U21s)	Friday, 27 June, 6:30pm	Parker Street Reserve	Mitchell Pitscheider
Newcastle Knights (U21s)	20 – 20	Canberra Raiders (U21s)	Saturday, 28 June, 11:00am	Newcastle Centre of Excellence	Brayden Hunt
St George Illawarra Dragons (U21s)	64 – 6	Parramatta Eels (U21s)	Saturday, 28 June, 11:00am	Croome Road Sporting Complex	Blake Williams
Wests Tigers (U21s)	22 – 28	Sydney Roosters (U21s)	Saturday, 28 June, 12:00pm	Lidcombe Oval	Adam Sirianni
Manly Warringah Sea Eagles (U21s)	22 – 26	New Zealand Warriors (U21s)	Saturday, 28 June, 1:15pm	4 Pines Park	Brandan Mani
South Sydney Rabbitohs (U21s)	14 – 40	Cronulla-Sutherland Sharks (U21s)	Sunday, 29 June, 1:00pm	Coogee Oval	Salvatore Marigliano
Round 18 (First Nations Round)
Penrith Panthers (U21s)	46 – 18	South Sydney Rabbitohs (U21s)	Friday, 4 July, 5:00pm	Parker Street Reserve	Mitchell Pitscheider
New Zealand Warriors (U21s)	40 – 18	Kaiviti Silktails (U21s)	Saturday, 5 July, 12:00pm	North Harbour Stadium	Jack Feavers
Newcastle Knights (U21s)	30 – 30	Canterbury-Bankstown Bulldogs (U21s)	Saturday, 5 July, 12:30pm	Newcastle Centre of Excellence	Blake Williams
Cronulla-Sutherland Sharks (U21s)	6 – 34	Melbourne Storm (U21s)	Saturday, 5 July, 12:50pm	Henson Park	Salvatore Marigliano
Manly Warringah Sea Eagles (U21s)	36 – 36	St George Illawarra Dragons (U21s)	Sunday, 6 July, 12:00pm	Sydney Academy of Sport	Brandan Mani
Sydney Roosters (U21s)	14 – 40	Parramatta Eels (U21s)	Sunday, 6 July, 12:45pm	Wentworth Park	Brayden Hunt
Canberra Raiders (U21s)	24 – 26	Wests Tigers (U21s)	Sunday, 6 July, 2:00pm	Raiders Belconnen	Gage Miles
Round 19
Cronulla-Sutherland Sharks (U21s)	48 – 18	Manly Warringah Sea Eagles (U21s)	Friday, 11 July, 5:35pm	Sharks Stadium	Gage Miles
Kaiviti Silktails (U21s)	6 – 34	Canberra Raiders (U21s)	Saturday, 12 July, 11:00am	King Charles Park	Harrison Baysarri
New Zealand Warriors (U21s)	44 – 42	Wests Tigers (U21s)	Saturday, 12 July, 12:00pm	North Harbour Stadium	Jack Feavers
Parramatta Eels (U21s)	16 – 40	Penrith Panthers (U21s)	Saturday, 12 July, 1:00pm	Kellyville Park	Ryan Micallef
Melbourne Storm (U21s)	34 – 26	Canterbury-Bankstown Bulldogs (U21s)	Saturday, 12 July, 2:00pm	Gosch's Paddock	Salvatore Marigliano
Newcastle Knights (U21s)	10 – 18	South Sydney Rabbitohs (U21s)	Sunday, 13 July, 12:30pm	Newcastle Centre of Excellence	Mitchell Pitscheider
Sydney Roosters (U21s)	38 – 12	St George Illawarra Dragons (U21s)	Sunday, 13 July, 1:00pm	Wentworth Park	Liam Richardson
Round 20
Cronulla-Sutherland Sharks (U21s)	18 – 20	Sydney Roosters (U21s)	Friday, 18 July, 3:35pm	Sharks Stadium	Kieren Irons
New Zealand Warriors (U21s)	12 – 48	Melbourne Storm (U21s)	Saturday, 19 July, 10:15am	North Harbour Stadium	Joseph Green
Canberra Raiders (U21s)	30 – 36	Parramatta Eels (U21s)	Saturday, 19 July, 11:45am	Raiders Belconnen	Bailey Warren
South Sydney Rabbitohs (U21s)	28 – 30	St George Illawarra Dragons (U21s)	Saturday, 19 July, 11:45am	Redfern Oval	Jabril Daizli
Canterbury-Bankstown Bulldogs (U21s)	36 – 16	Manly Warringah Sea Eagles (U21s)	Saturday, 19 July, 11:45am	Belmore Sports Ground	Salvatore Marigliano
Wests Tigers (U21s)	32 – 20	Penrith Panthers (U21s)	Saturday, 19 July, 12:00pm	Lidcombe Oval	Ryan Micallef
Newcastle Knights (U21s)	58 – 14	Kaiviti Silktails (U21s)	Sunday, 20 July, 11:30am	Cessnock Sportsground	Harrison Baysarri
Round 21
St George Illawarra Dragons (U21s)	BYE	Newcastle Knights (U21s)
South Sydney Rabbitohs (U21s)	BYE	Sydney Roosters (U21s)
Cronulla-Sutherland Sharks (U21s)	BYE	Melbourne Storm (U21s)
Wests Tigers (U21s)	BYE	Canterbury-Bankstown Bulldogs (U21s)
Parramatta Eels (U21s)	BYE	Penrith Panthers (U21s)
Canberra Raiders (U21s)	BYE	Manly Warringah Sea Eagles (U21s)
Kaiviti Silktails (U21s)	BYE	New Zealand Warriors (U21s)
Round 22
Wests Tigers (U21s)	25 – 14	Canberra Raiders (U21s)	Saturday, 2 August, 12:00pm	Lidcombe Oval	Adam Sirianni
Parramatta Eels (U21s)	44 – 18	South Sydney Rabbitohs (U21s)	Saturday, 2 August, 1:00pm	Kellyville Park	Ryan Micallef
Newcastle Knights (U21s)	20 – 18	Melbourne Storm (U21s)	Saturday, 2 August, 1:30pm	Newcastle Centre of Excellence	Salvatore Marigliano
Penrith Panthers (U21s)	50 – 0	Kaiviti Silktails (U21s)	Saturday, 2 August, 3:00pm	Panthers Centre of Excellence	Liam Richardson
Canterbury-Bankstown Bulldogs (U21s)	8 – 18	Cronulla-Sutherland Sharks (U21s)	Monday, 4 August, 7:00pm	Onslow Oval	Mitchell Pitscheider
Manly Warringah Sea Eagles (U21s)	18 – 16	Sydney Roosters (U21s)	Tuesday, 5 August, 7:00pm	NSWRL Centre of Excellence	Harrison Baysarri
St George Illawarra Dragons (U21s)	0 – 0*	New Zealand Warriors (U21s)	N/A
Round 23
St George Illawarra Dragons (U21s)	26 – 10	Canberra Raiders (U21s)	Saturday, 9 August, 11:15am	Collegians Sporting Complex	Ryan Micallef
Canterbury-Bankstown Bulldogs (U21s)	26 – 14	New Zealand Warriors (U21s)	Saturday, 9 August, 11:30am	Leichhardt Oval	Lachlan Greenfield
Manly Warringah Sea Eagles (U21s)	16 – 44	Newcastle Knights (U21s)	Saturday, 9 August, 11:45am	4 Pines Park	Jake Walsh
Cronulla-Sutherland Sharks (U21s)	24 – 16	Penrith Panthers (U21s)	Saturday, 9 August, 12:50pm	Henson Park	Mitchell Pitscheider
Parramatta Eels (U21s)	24 – 18	Melbourne Storm (U21s)	Saturday, 9 August, 1:00pm	Kellyville Park	Adam Sirianni
Wests Tigers (U21s)	34 – 22	Kaiviti Silktails (U21s)	Saturday, 9 August, 2:00pm	Lidcombe Oval	Bailey Warren
Sydney Roosters (U21s)	44 – 12	South Sydney Rabbitohs (U21s)	Sunday, 10 August, 12:00pm	Wentworth Park	Harrison Baysarri
Round 24
Penrith Panthers (U21s)	60 – 22	New Zealand Warriors (U21s)	Saturday, 16 August, 11:00am	St Marys Leagues Stadium	Jabril Daizli
Kaiviti Silktails (U21s)	36 – 16	Manly Warringah Sea Eagles (U21s)	Saturday, 16 August, 12:00pm	Churchill Park	Ryan Micallef
Parramatta Eels (U21s)	46 – 16	Cronulla-Sutherland Sharks (U21s)	Saturday, 16 August, 1:00pm	Kellyville Park	Bailey Warren
Canberra Raiders (U21s)	24 – 22	Canterbury-Bankstown Bulldogs (U21s)	Saturday, 16 August, 1:15pm	Raiders Belconnen	Harrison Baysarri
Newcastle Knights (U21s)	18 – 8	St George Illawarra Dragons (U21s)	Saturday, 16 August, 1:30pm	Newcastle Centre of Excellence	Jake Walsh
Melbourne Storm (U21s)	46 – 12	Sydney Roosters (U21s)	Saturday, 16 August, 2:00pm	Seabrook Reserve	Salvatore Marigliano
Wests Tigers (U21s)	42 – 6	South Sydney Rabbitohs (U21s)	Saturday, 16 August, 2:00pm	Lidcombe Oval	Adam Sirianni
Round 25
Kaiviti Silktails (U21s)	16 – 22	Cronulla-Sutherland Sharks (U21s)	Saturday, 23 August, 11:00am	King Charles Park	Blake Williams
Penrith Panthers (U21s)	44 – 30	St George Illawarra Dragons (U21s)	Saturday, 23 August, 12:00pm	St Marys Leagues Stadium	Louis Matheson
Wests Tigers (U21s)	32 – 38	Canterbury-Bankstown Bulldogs (U21s)	Saturday, 23 August, 12:00pm	Lidcombe Oval	Brendan Mani
South Sydney Rabbitohs (U21s)	12 – 46	Canberra Raiders (U21s)	Saturday, 23 August, 12:45pm	Redfern Oval	Adam Sirianni
Melbourne Storm (U21s)	64 – 4	Manly Warringah Sea Eagles (U21s)	Saturday, 23 August, 2:00pm	Gosch's Paddock	Mitchell Pitscheider
Sydney Roosters (U21s)	30 – 6	Newcastle Knights (U21s)	Saturday, 23 August, 3:15pm	Newcastle Centre of Excellence	Lachlan Greenfield
New Zealand Warriors (U21s)	26 – 10	Parramatta Eels (U21s)	Sunday, 24 August, 11:45am	FMG Stadium	Joseph Green
Round 26
Kaiviti Silktails (U21s)	22 – 22	South Sydney Rabbitohs (U21s)	Saturday, 30 August, 11:00am	Churchill Park	Adam Sirianni
Newcastle Knights (U21s)	20 – 28	New Zealand Warriors (U21s)	Saturday, 30 August, 11:45am	Newcastle Centre of Excellence	Salvatore Marigliano
Canberra Raiders (U21s)	40 – 18	Penrith Panthers (U21s)	Saturday, 30 August, 12:00pm	NSWRL HQ Bruce	Gage Miles
Melbourne Storm (U21s)	22 – 52	Parramatta Eels (U21s)	Saturday, 30 August, 2:00pm	Seabrook Reserve	Ryan Micallef
Canterbury-Bankstown Bulldogs (U21s)	38 – 22	St George Illawarra Dragons (U21s)	Saturday, 30 August, 5:00pm	McCredie Park	Blake Williams
Manly Warringah Sea Eagles (U21s)	24 – 50	Cronulla-Sutherland Sharks (U21s)	Sunday, 31 August, 12:00pm	4 Pines Park	Brendan Mani
Sydney Roosters (U21s)	30 – 36	Wests Tigers (U21s)	Sunday, 31 August, 12:30pm	Wentworth Park	Mitchell Pitscheider
Finals Series
Qualifying & Elimination Finals
Cronulla-Sutherland Sharks (U21s)	16 – 12	Canberra Raiders (U21s)	Saturday, 6 September, 12:00pm	Jubilee Stadium	Dillan Wells
Penrith Panthers (U21s)	32 – 12	Parramatta Eels (U21s)	Saturday, 6 September, 4:00pm	Jubilee Stadium	Ethan Klein
Major & Minor Semi-Finals
Melbourne Storm (U21s)	38 – 10	Cronulla-Sutherland Sharks (U21s)	Sunday, 14 September, 11:00am	Leichhardt Oval	Ethan Klein
Canberra Raiders (U21s)	18 – 32	Penrith Panthers (U21s)	Sunday, 14 September, 3:00pm	Leichhardt Oval	Dillan Wells
Preliminary Final
Cronulla-Sutherland Sharks (U21s)	36 – 40	Penrith Panthers (U21s)	Saturday, 20 September, 1:00pm	Jubilee Stadium	Daniel Luttringer
Grand Final
Melbourne Storm (U21s)	V	Penrith Panthers (U21s)	Sunday, 28 September, 11:00am	CommBank Stadium	TBA

==== Grand Final ====
Qualifying & Elimination Finals
2	Cronulla-Sutherland	16
3	Canberra	12
4	Penrith	32
5	Parramatta	12

Major Semi-Final
1	Melbourne	38
2	Cronulla-Sutherland	10
Minor Semi-Final
3	Canberra	18
4	Penrith	32

Preliminary Final
2	Cronulla-Sutherland	36
4	Penrith	40

Grand Final
1	Melbourne
4	Penrith

2025 Jersey Flegg Cup Grand Final

Sunday, 28 September 2025
11:00am

Melbourne Storm (U21s)	v	Penrith Panthers (U21s)

CommBank Stadium, Sydney

== Country Championships ==
=== Men's Country Championships ===
The Men's Country Championships is a statewide men's competition that features regional representative teams. This competition was previously run by the Country Rugby League until the CRL merged with the NSWRL in 2019.

==== Teams ====
Colours	Club	Home ground(s)	Head coach
Northern Conference
	Central Coast Roosters	Various	Anthony Clarke
	Greater Northern Tigers	Various	Brad McManus
	Newcastle Rebels	Various	Garth Brennan
	North Coast Bulldogs	Various	Justin Laurie
	Northern Rivers Titans	Various	Wayne Forbes
Southern Conference
	Illawarra-South Coast Dragons	Various	Jarrod Costello
	Macarthur-Wests Tigers	Various	Luke Deller
	Monaro Colts	Various	Jason Kelly
	Riverina Bulls	Various	Aaron Gorrell
	Western Rams	Various	Kurt Hancock

Season Results:

Home	Score	Away	Match Information
Home	Score	Away	Date and Time	Venue	Referee	Video
Round 1
Macarthur-Wests Tigers	6 – 48	Illawarra-South Coast Dragons	Saturday, 22 February, 1:00pm	Kirkham Oval	Paul Eden
Central Coast Roosters	54 – 12	North Coast Bulldogs	Saturday, 22 February, 2:30pm	Woy Woy Oval	Louis Matheson
Round 2
Newcastle Rebels	38 – 12	Central Coast Roosters	Saturday, 8 March, 4:00pm	Lakeside Sporting Complex	Louis Matheson
Monaro Colts	36 – 30	Illawarra-South Coast Dragons	Sunday, 9 March, 2:50pm	NSWRL HQ Bruce	Blake Williams
Riverina Bulls	18 – 28	Western Rams	Sunday, 9 March, 3:30pm	Paramore Park	Gage Miles
Northern Rivers Titans	58 – 16	Greater Northern Tigers	Sunday, 16 March, 11:30am	Jack Woolaston Oval	Brayden Hunt
Semi-Finals
Newcastle Rebels	20 – 0	Western Rams	Sunday, 23 March, 11:20am	Cessnock Sportsground	Brayden Hunt
Monaro Colts	12 – 56	Northern Rivers Titans	Sunday, 23 March, 1:00pm	Collegians Sporting Complex	Ethan Klein
Grand Final
Newcastle Rebels	32 – 28	Northern Rivers Titans	Saturday, 29 March, 3:00pm	GIO Stadium	Brayden Hunt

==== Grand Final ====
2025 Men's Country Championships Grand Final

Saturday, 29 March 2025
3:00pm

Newcastle Rebels	32 – 28	Northern Rivers Titans
Tries: Matthew Soper-Lawler (22', 42', 75') 3 Liam Wiscombe (8', 50') 2 Liam Wilkinson (40') 1 Goals: Chad O'Donnell 4/6 (10', 24', 44', 52')	1st: 16 – 12; 2nd: 16 – 16	Tries: 2 (3', 67') Jett Forbes; 1 (28') Jacob Kernick; 1 (62') Zacharia Roberts; 1 (72') Toby Marks; Goals: 4/6 Elliott Speed (5', 35'p, 68', 73')

GIO Stadium, Canberra
Referee: Brayden Hunt
Touch judges: Balunn Simon & William Damato

Team details
Newcastle		Position	Northern Rivers
Name	Number	Position	Number	Name
Cameron Anderson	1	Fullback	1	Hezekiah McKenzie
James Bradley	2	Wing	2	Zacharia Roberts
Matthew Soper-Lawler	3	Centre	3	Adam Walker
Logan Radzievic	4	Centre	4	Caleb Nicholls
Timanu Alexander	5	Wing	5	Jett Forbes
Chad O'Donnell (c)	6	Five eighth	6	Toby Marks
Isaiah Olsen	7	Half back	7	Elliott Speed
Jake Goodwin	8	Prop forward	8	Daniel Ross (c)
Liam Wilkinson	9	Hooker	9	Michael Dwane
James Taylor	10	Prop forward	10	Parker Bryant
Lachlan Williams	22	Second row	11	Jacob Kernick
Liam Wiscombe	12	Second row	12	Jyde Dwyer
Lachlan O'Brien	13	Lock forward	13	Caleb Ziebell
Matthew Moon	14	Interchange	14	William Baker
Luke Higgins	15	Interchange	15	Connor Ziebell
Justin Afflick	16	Interchange	16	Henry Lee
Reeve Howard	17	Interchange	17	Ethan Schultz
William Nieuwenhuise	18	Reserve
Garth Brennan		Coach		Wayne Forbes

=== Women's Country Championships ===
The Women's Country Championships is a statewide women's competition that features regional representative teams. This competition was previously run by the Country Rugby League until the CRL merged with the NSWRL in 2019.

==== Teams ====
Colours	Club	Home ground(s)	Head coach
Northern Conference
	Greater Northern Tigers (W)	Various	Mick Schmiedel
	North Coast Bulldogs (W)	Various	Whitney McCabe
	Northern Rivers Titans (W)	Various	Chris Binge
Southern Conference
	Monaro Colts (W)	Various	David Small
	Riverina Bulls (W)	Various	Bernard Delaney
	Western Rams (W)	Various	Kevin Grimshaw

==== Ladder ====
Northern Conference

Pos	Team	Pld	W	D	L	B	PF	PA	PD	Pts	Qualification
1	Northern Rivers Titans (W)	2	2	0	0	1	58	14	+44	6	Grand Final
2	North Coast Bulldogs (W)	2	1	0	1	1	38	26	+12	4	
3	Greater Northern Tigers (W)	2	0	0	2	1	14	70	–56	2	

Updated to match(es) played on 1 September. Source:
Rules for classification: 1) points; 2) point difference; 3) points scored

Southern Conference

Pos	Team	Pld	W	D	L	B	PF	PA	PD	Pts	Qualification
1	Western Rams (W)	2	2	0	0	1	86	8	+78	6	Grand Final
2	Monaro Colts (W)	2	1	0	1	0	62	20	+42	2	
3	Riverina Bulls (W)	2	0	0	2	1	0	120	-120	2	

Updated to match(es) played on 1 September. Source:
Rules for classification: 1) points; 2) point difference; 3) points scored

===== Ladder Progression =====
- Numbers highlighted in green indicates the team finished first place on the ladder in that round.
- Numbers highlighted in red indicates the team finished last place on the ladder in that round.
- Underlined numbers indicate that the team had a bye during that round.

Pos	Team	1	2	3
Northern Conference
1	Northern Rivers Titans (W)	2	4	6
2	North Coast Bulldogs (W)	0	2	4
3	Greater Northern Tigers (W)	2	2	2
Southern Conference
1	Western Rams (W)	2	4	6
2	Monaro Colts (W)	0	2	4
3	Riverina Bulls (W)	2	2	2

Season Results:

Home	Score	Away	Match Information
Home	Score	Away	Date and Time	Venue	Referee	Video
Round 1
North Coast Bulldogs (W)	8 – 18	Northern Rivers Titans (W)	Saturday, 15 February, 2:20pm	Geoff King Motors Oval	Jack Fisher
Western Rams (W)	20 – 8	Monaro Colts (W)	Sunday, 23 February, 1:30pm	Tom Clyburn Oval	Sonny Eastwood
Greater Northern Tigers (W)	BYE	Riverina Bulls (W)
Round 2
Greater Northern Tigers (W)	8 – 30	North Coast Bulldogs (W)	Saturday, 1 March, 11:20am	Scone Park	Lachlan Smith
Monaro Colts (W)	54 – 0	Riverina Bulls (W)	Sunday, 2 March, 2:10pm	NSWRL HQ Bruce	Billy Perrott
Northern Rivers Titans (W)	BYE	Western Rams (W)
Round 3
Riverina Bulls (W)	0 – 66	Western Rams (W)	Sunday, 9 March, 11:20am	Paramore Park	Callum Rigby
Northern Rivers Titans (W)	40 – 6	Greater Northern Tigers (W)	Sunday, 16 March, 10:15am	Jack Woolaston Oval	Oscar Perkins
North Coast Bulldogs (W)	BYE	Monaro Colts (W)
Finals Series
Grand Final
Western Rams (W)	46 – 6	Northern Rivers Titans (W)	Saturday, 29 March, 4:45pm	GIO Stadium	Callum Richardson

==== Grand Final ====
2025 Women's Country Championships Grand Final

Saturday, 29 March 2025
4:45pm

Western Rams (W)	46 – 6	Northern Rivers Titans (W)
Tries: Tiana Anderson (2', 18') 2 Xanthe Booth (12', 41') 2 Grace Blackmore (24', 44') 2 Rebecca Trethowan (16') 1 Alahna Ryan (52') 1 Lilly Baker (60') 1 Goals: Sarah Colman 5/9 (13', 25', 43', 45', 60')	1st: 24 – 0; 2nd: 22 – 6	Tries: 1 (47') Taharni Robers; Goals: 1/1 Karri Williams (48')

GIO Stadium, Canberra
Referee: Callum Richardson
Touch judges: Billy Perrott & Amelia Sheppard

Team details
Western		Position	Northern Rivers
Name	Number	Position	Number	Name
Tiana Anderson	1	Fullback	1	Keniesha Hall
Sophie Tilburg	2	Wing	2	Krystal McMahon
Meredith Jones	3	Centre	3	Yuri Fuller
Alahna Ryan	5	Centre	4	Sharyn Blundell
Lara Edwards	15	Wing	5	Tanisha Martin
Carly Abbott	6	Five eighth	6	Karri Williams (c)
Sarah Colman	7	Half back	7	Chloe Saddler
Kate Gullifer	4	Prop forward	22	Teearn Parker
Xanthe Booth	9	Hooker	9	Shaniquea Roberts-Welsh
Danielle Plummer	16	Prop forward	18	Isabelle Zammit
Rebecca Trethowan (c)	17	Second row	11	Tamar McHugh
Cheynoah Amone	12	Second row	10	Japirra Torrens
Lilly Baker	13	Lock forward	13	Raeyah Kapeen (c)
Maggie Townsend	11	Interchange	8	Summer Renolds
Grace Blackmore	18	Interchange	14	Chelsea Apps
Chloe Patrick	20	Interchange	17	Taharni Robers
Nicole Schneider	21	Interchange	20	Tykia Donovan
Meelah Lawton-Rei	19	Reserve	19	Jordan Diehm
Kevin Grimshaw		Coach		Christopher Binge

== See also ==
- 2025 NSWRL Feeder Competitions
- 2025 QRL Major Competitions
- 2025 QRL Feeder Competitions
