= 2024 NSWRL Major Competitions =

The New South Wales Rugby League will administer several Major Competitions during the 2024 season. This will include five men's competitions, two women's competitions and an under 21s competition.

== Tier 1 ==
=== Knock-On Effect NSW Cup ===
2024 Knock-On Effect NSW Cup
- Duration: 7 March – 29 September 2024
- Teams: 13
- Premiers: Newtown (9th title)
- Minor premiers: North Sydney
- Wooden spoon: Western Suburbs
- Broadcast partners: NSWRL TV
- Player of the year: Adam Cook

The New South Wales Cup is the statewide premier men's competition. It feeds directly into the National Rugby League.

==== Teams ====
Colours	Club	Home ground(s)	Head coach
	Blacktown Workers Sea Eagles	4 Pines Park, HE Laybutt Field	Wayne Lambkin
	Canberra Raiders	GIO Stadium	Brock Sheppard
	Canterbury-Bankstown Bulldogs	Accor Stadium, Belmore Sports Ground	Michael Potter
	New Zealand Warriors	Go Media Stadium, North Harbour Stadium	David Tangata-Toa
	Newcastle Knights	McDonald Jones Stadium	Ron Griffiths
	Newtown Jets	Henson Park	George Ndaira
	North Sydney Bears	North Sydney Oval	Pat Weisner
	Parramatta Eels	CommBank Stadium, Eric Tweedale Stadium	Nathan Cayless
	Penrith Panthers	BlueBet Stadium	Ben Harden
	South Sydney Rabbitohs	Accor Stadium, Redfern Oval	Joe O'Callaghan
	St George Illawarra Dragons	Collegians Sporting Complex	Bronx Goodwin
	Sydney Roosters	Wentworth Park	Brett Morris
	Western Suburbs Magpies	Lidcombe Oval, Campbelltown Sports Stadium	Aaron Payne

==== Ladder ====
Pos	Team	Pld	W	D	L	B	PF	PA	PD	Pts
1	North Sydney Bears	24	15	2	7	2	560	479	+81	36
2	Newtown Jets	24	15	1	8	2	654	492	+162	35
3	Canberra Raiders (B)	24	14	2	8	2	713	456	+257	34
4	New Zealand Warriors (B)	24	14	1	9	2	590	506	+84	33
5	Penrith Panthers (B)	24	13	3	8	2	602	520	+82	33
6	St George Illawarra Dragons (B)	24	14	0	10	2	580	447	+133	32
7	Canterbury-Bankstown Bulldogs (B)	24	14	0	10	2	622	547	+75	32
8	Newcastle Knights (B)	24	11	0	13	2	595	650	–55	26
9	Blacktown Workers Sea Eagles	24	10	0	14	2	566	704	-138	24
10	Sydney Roosters (B)	24	9	1	14	2	540	583	–41	23
11	Parramatta Eels (B)	24	9	1	14	2	535	678	-143	23
12	South Sydney Rabbitohs (B)	24	6	1	17	2	482	658	-176	17
13	Western Suburbs Magpies	24	6	0	18	2	454	773	-319	16

Updated to match(es) played on 1 September. Source:
Rules for classification: 1) points; 2) point difference; 3) points scored

===== Ladder progression =====
- Numbers highlighted in green indicate that the team finished the round inside the top 5.
- Numbers highlighted in blue indicates the team finished first on the ladder in that round.
- Numbers highlighted in red indicates the team finished last place on the ladder in that round.
- Underlined numbers indicate that the team had a bye during that round.

Pos	Team	1	2	3	4	5	6	7	8	9	10	11	12	13	14	15	16	17	18	19	20	21	22	23	24	25	26
1	North Sydney Bears	2	4	4	6	8	8	10	12	13	13	15	17	19	21	23	25	27	29	31	33	33	33	33	34	34	36
2	Newtown Jets	0	2	4	5	7	7	7	7	9	11	13	15	17	19	19	21	21	23	25	25	27	29	31	33	33	35
3	Canberra Raiders (B)	2	4	6	7	9	9	9	11	13	15	15	17	19	21	22	24	24	26	28	28	30	30	32	34	34	34
4	New Zealand Warriors (B)	2	2	2	4	4	4	6	7	9	11	13	13	15	17	19	21	23	23	25	27	27	29	31	31	33	33
5	Penrith Panthers (B)	2	4	6	8	10	12	14	15	17	17	17	17	17	17	17	17	19	21	21	23	25	27	28	29	31	33
6	St George Illawarra Dragons (B)	0	2	4	6	6	8	8	8	8	10	12	14	16	16	16	16	18	20	22	24	24	26	28	28	30	32
7	Canterbury-Bankstown Bulldogs (B)	2	2	2	4	6	8	10	12	14	16	16	16	16	18	20	22	22	24	24	26	28	30	30	30	30	32
8	Newcastle Knights (B)	0	0	2	2	4	6	6	8	8	8	8	10	12	12	14	16	16	16	18	20	22	22	22	24	26	26
9	Blacktown Workers Sea Eagles	2	2	4	4	4	6	8	8	8	8	10	12	12	14	16	18	20	20	20	20	20	22	22	24	24	24
10	Sydney Roosters (B)	0	2	2	2	2	2	4	6	7	7	9	9	9	9	9	9	11	11	11	11	13	15	17	19	21	23
11	Parramatta Eels (B)	0	0	0	0	0	2	2	4	6	8	10	12	12	14	16	16	18	20	20	20	20	20	21	21	23	23
12	South Sydney Rabbitohs (B)	0	2	4	4	6	8	10	10	10	10	10	10	12	12	13	13	13	13	13	15	15	15	15	17	17	17
13	Western Suburbs Magpies	2	2	2	4	4	4	4	4	4	6	6	6	6	6	6	6	6	6	8	8	10	10	12	12	14	16

Season Results:

Round 1

Home	Score	Away	Match Information
Home	Score	Away	Date and Time	Venue	Referee	Video
Newcastle Knights (B)	22 – 38	Canberra Raiders (B)	Thursday, 7 March, 5:30pm	McDonald Jones Stadium	Martin Jones
New Zealand Warriors (B)	28 – 24	Newtown Jets	Friday, 8 March, 5:15pm	Go Media Stadium	Jake Sutherland
Blacktown Workers Sea Eagles	24 – 20	South Sydney Rabbitohs (B)	Saturday, 9 March, 3:00pm	4 Pines Park	Mitch Currie
Penrith Panthers (B)	28 – 22	Sydney Roosters (B)	Saturday, 9 March, 3:00pm	St Marys Leagues Stadium	Daniel Luttringer
Parramatta Eels (B)	36 – 38	Canterbury-Bankstown Bulldogs (B)	Saturday, 9 March, 3:05pm	CommBank Stadium	Kieren Irons
St George Illawarra Dragons (B)	4 – 28	North Sydney Bears	Sunday, 10 March, 12:15pm	Collegians Sporting Complex	Clayton Wills
Western Suburbs Magpies		BYE

Round 2

Home	Score	Away	Match Information
Home	Score	Away	Date and Time	Venue	Referee	Video
Newtown Jets	28 – 16	Canterbury-Bankstown Bulldogs (B)	Friday, 15 March, 3:45pm	PointsBet Stadium	Kieren Irons
Penrith Panthers (B)	24 – 4	Parramatta Eels (B)	Friday, 15 March, 5:45pm	BlueBet Stadium	Daniel Luttringer
Canberra Raiders (B)	50 – 12	Western Suburbs Magpies	Saturday, 16 March, 12:40pm	GIO Stadium	Martin Jones
St George Illawarra Dragons (B)	30 – 16	Newcastle Knights (B)	Saturday, 16 March, 2:00pm	Sid Parrish Park	Clayton Wills
New Zealand Warriors (B)	18 – 38	North Sydney Bears	Sunday, 17 March, 1:00pm	Navigation Home Stadium	Mitch Currie
Blacktown Workers Sea Eagles	12 – 34	Sydney Roosters (B)	Sunday, 17 March, 1:45pm	4 Pines Park	Jake Sutherland
South Sydney Rabbitohs (B)		BYE

Round 3

Home	Score	Away	Match Information
Home	Score	Away	Date and Time	Venue	Referee	Video
Sydney Roosters (B)	12 – 28	South Sydney Rabbitohs (B)	Friday, 22 March, 5:30pm	Allianz Stadium	Mitch Currie
Canterbury-Bankstown Bulldogs (B)	10 – 34	Penrith Panthers (B)	Saturday, 23 March, 12:40pm	Belmore Sports Ground	Damian Brady
Canberra Raiders (B)	42 – 4	New Zealand Warriors (B)	Saturday, 23 March, 2:00pm	Seiffert Oval	Daniel Luttringer
Parramatta Eels (B)	20 – 40	Blacktown Workers Sea Eagles	Sunday, 24 March, 1:35pm	CommBank Stadium	Kasey Badger
Western Suburbs Magpies	24 – 25	Newtown Jets	Sunday, 24 March, 2:00pm	Lidcombe Oval	Martin Jones
Newcastle Knights (B)	50 – 24	North Sydney Bears	Sunday, 24 March, 3:45pm	McDonald Jones Stadium	Jake Sutherland
St George Illawarra Dragons (B)		BYE

Round 4

Home	Score	Away	Match Information
Home	Score	Away	Date and Time	Venue	Referee	Video
South Sydney Rabbitohs (B)	20 – 22	Canterbury-Bankstown Bulldogs (B)	Friday, 29 March, 1:40pm	Accor Stadium	Ziggy Prezeklasa-Adamski
Newtown Jets	28 – 28	Canberra Raiders (B)	Saturday, 30 March, 3:00pm	Henson Park	Cameron Turner
St George Illawarra Dragons (B)	38 – 10	Blacktown Workers Sea Eagles	Saturday, 30 March, 3:10pm	WIN Stadium	Mitch Currie
New Zealand Warriors (B)	26 – 12	Newcastle Knights (B)	Sunday, 31 March, 3:20pm	Go Media Stadium	Paki Parkinson
Sydney Roosters (B)	14 – 30	Penrith Panthers (B)	Sunday, 31 March, 3:00pm	Wentworth Park	Damian Brady
Parramatta Eels (B)	26 – 32	Western Suburbs Magpies	Monday, 1 April, 1:40pm	CommBank Stadium	Chris Sutton
North Sydney Bears		BYE

Round 5

Home	Score	Away	Match Information
Home	Score	Away	Date and Time	Venue	Referee	Video
Newcastle Knights (B)	30 – 24	St George Illawarra Dragons (B)	Friday, 5 April, 5:45pm	McDonald Jones Stadium	Jake Sutherland
South Sydney Rabbitohs (B)	26 – 20	New Zealand Warriors (B)	Saturday, 6 April, 12:40pm	Accor Stadium	Daniel Luttringer
Blacktown Workers Sea Eagles	20 – 26	Penrith Panthers (B)	Saturday, 6 April, 3:00pm	4 Pines Park	Chris Sutton
Canterbury-Bankstown Bulldogs (B)	20 – 14	Sydney Roosters (B)	Saturday, 6 April, 5:00pm	Belmore Sports Ground	Karra-Lee Nolan
North Sydney Bears	42 – 16	Western Suburbs Magpies	Sunday, 7 April, 3:00pm	North Sydney Oval	Damian Brady
Canberra Raiders (B)	30 – 6	Parramatta Eels (B)	Sunday, 7 April, 4:00pm	GIO Stadium	Mitch Currie
Newtown Jets		BYE

Round 6

Home	Score	Away	Match Information
Home	Score	Away	Date and Time	Venue	Referee	Video
Newcastle Knights (B)	30 – 26	Sydney Roosters (B)	Thursday, 11 April, 5:20pm	McDonald Jones Stadium	Chris Sutton
Western Suburbs Magpies	18 – 24	St George Illawarra Dragons (B)	Saturday, 13 April, 2:00pm	Lidcombe Oval	Jake Sutherland
New Zealand Warriors (B)	18 – 24	Blacktown Workers Sea Eagles	Saturday, 13 April, 2:40pm	Go Media Stadium	Karra-Lee Nolan
Parramatta Eels (B)	30 – 28	North Sydney Bears	Saturday, 13 April, 3:00pm	CommBank Stadium	Cameron Turner
South Sydney Rabbitohs (B)	24 – 12	Newtown Jets	Saturday, 13 April, 5:10pm	Accor Stadium	Daniel Luttringer
Canberra Raiders (B)	20 – 26	Canterbury-Bankstown Bulldogs (B)	Sunday, 14 April, 4:00pm	GIO Stadium	Clayton Wills
Penrith Panthers (B)		BYE

Round 7

Home	Score	Away	Match Information
Home	Score	Away	Date and Time	Venue	Referee	Video
Penrith Panthers (B)	40 – 14	Western Suburbs Magpies	Saturday, 20 April, 1:00pm	BlueBet Stadium	Karra-Lee Nolan
St George Illawarra Dragons (B)	24 – 26	New Zealand Warriors (B)	Saturday, 20 April, 1:00pm	Collegians Sporting Complex	Jake Sutherland
Newtown Jets	10 – 14	Blacktown Workers Sea Eagles	Saturday, 20 April, 3:00pm	Henson Park	Daniel Luttringer
Canterbury-Bankstown Bulldogs (B)	52 – 6	Newcastle Knights (B)	Sunday, 21 April, 11:30am	Accor Stadium	Damian Brady
North Sydney Bears	20 – 12	Canberra Raiders (B)	Sunday, 21 April, 3:00pm	North Sydney Oval	Kieren Irons
Sydney Roosters (B)	24 – 20	Parramatta Eels (B)	Sunday, 21 April, 3:00pm	Wentworth Park	Cameron Turner
South Sydney Rabbitohs (B)		BYE

Round 8

Home	Score	Away	Match Information
Home	Score	Away	Date and Time	Venue	Referee	Video
New Zealand Warriors (B)	22 – 22	Penrith Panthers (B)	Saturday, 27 April, 12:00pm	North Harbour Stadium	Daniel Luttringer
St George Illawarra Dragons (B)	18 – 19	Sydney Roosters (B)	Saturday, 27 April, 1:00pm	Collegians Sporting Complex	Chris Sutton
Western Suburbs Magpies	16 – 28	North Sydney Bears	Saturday, 27 April, 3:05pm	Campbelltown Sports Stadium	Karra-Lee Nolan
Canberra Raiders (B)	42 – 12	Newtown Jets	Sunday, 28 April, 1:50pm	GIO Stadium	Damian Brady
Newcastle Knights (B)	34 – 12	South Sydney Rabbitohs (B)	Sunday, 28 April, 2:30pm	Newcastle Centre of Excellence	Mitch Currie
Blacktown Workers Sea Eagles	22 – 36	Parramatta Eels (B)	Sunday, 28 April, 3:00pm	HE Laybutt Field	Clayton Wills
Canterbury-Bankstown Bulldogs (B)		BYE

Round 9

Home	Score	Away	Match Information
Home	Score	Away	Date and Time	Venue	Referee	Video
South Sydney Rabbitohs (B)	10 – 30	Penrith Panthers (B)	Thursday, 2 May, 5:25pm	Accor Stadium	Clayton Wills
Canterbury-Bankstown Bulldogs (B)	42 – 12	Western Suburbs Magpies	Saturday, 4 May, 12:40pm	Accor Stadium	Kieren Irons
Blacktown Workers Sea Eagles	22 – 42	Canberra Raiders (B)	Saturday, 4 May, 1:45pm	4 Pines Park	Mitch Currie
Newtown Jets	26 – 10	St George Illawarra Dragons (B)	Saturday, 4 May, 3:00pm	Henson Park	Damian Brady
Newcastle Knights (B)	7 – 12	New Zealand Warriors (B)	Sunday, 5 May, 11:30am	McDonald Jones Stadium	Martin Jones
North Sydney Bears	10 – 10	Sydney Roosters (B)	Sunday, 5 May, 3:00pm	North Sydney Oval	Jake Sutherland
Parramatta Eels (B)		BYE

Round 10

Home	Score	Away	Match Information
Home	Score	Away	Date and Time	Venue	Referee	Video
Penrith Panthers (B)	12 – 30	Canterbury-Bankstown Bulldogs (B)	Friday, 10 May, 3:45pm	BlueBet Stadium	Clayton Wills
St George Illawarra Dragons (B)	26 – 6	South Sydney Rabbitohs (B)	Saturday, 11 May, 12:40pm	Netstrada Jubilee Stadium	Kieren Irons
New Zealand Warriors (B)	26 – 20	Sydney Roosters (B)	Sunday, 12 May, 12:00pm	North Harbour Stadium	Paki Parkinson
Western Suburbs Magpies	24 – 10	Newcastle Knights (B)	Sunday, 12 May, 2:00pm	Lidcombe Oval	Daniel Luttringer
Blacktown Workers Sea Eagles	16 – 22	Newtown Jets	Sunday, 12 May, 3:00pm	HE Laybutt Field	Jake Sutherland
North Sydney Bears	24 – 31	Parramatta Eels (B)	Sunday, 12 May, 3:00pm	North Sydney Oval	Martin Jones
Canberra Raiders (B)		BYE

Round 11

Home	Score	Away	Match Information
Home	Score	Away	Date and Time	Venue	Referee	Video
Penrith Panthers (B)	10 – 22	New Zealand Warriors (B)	Saturday, 18 May, 1:00pm	North Sydney Oval	Kieren Irons
Canberra Raiders (B)	16 – 24	St George Illawarra Dragons (B)	Saturday, 18 May, 3:00pm	North Sydney Oval	Clayton Wills
North Sydney Bears	30 – 20	South Sydney Rabbitohs (B)	Saturday, 18 May, 5:00pm	North Sydney Oval	Damian Brady
Western Suburbs Magpies	14 – 36	Parramatta Eels (B)	Sunday, 19 May, 11:00am	North Sydney Oval	Martin Jones
Newtown Jets	52 – 12	Newcastle Knights (B)	Sunday, 19 May, 1:00pm	North Sydney Oval	Daniel Luttringer
Blacktown Workers Sea Eagles	32 – 16	Canterbury-Bankstown Bulldogs (B)	Sunday, 19 May, 3:00pm	North Sydney Oval	Jake Sutherland
Sydney Roosters (B)		BYE

Round 12

Home	Score	Away	Match Information
Home	Score	Away	Date and Time	Venue	Referee	Video
Canterbury-Bankstown Bulldogs (B)	12 – 28	St George Illawarra Dragons (B)	Thursday, 23 May, 5:30pm	Accor Stadium	Damian Brady
Canberra Raiders (B)	36 – 28	Sydney Roosters (B)	Saturday, 25 May, 12:40pm	GIO Stadium	Kieren Irons
Newtown Jets	44 – 6	Penrith Panthers (B)	Saturday, 25 May, 3:00pm	Henson Park	Daniel Luttringer
South Sydney Rabbitohs (B)	24 – 32	Parramatta Eels (B)	Saturday, 25 May, 5:05pm	Accor Stadium	Mitch Currie
North Sydney Bears	22 – 16	New Zealand Warriors (B)	Sunday, 26 May, 1:00pm	North Sydney Oval	Chris Sutton
Blacktown Workers Sea Eagles	50 – 30	Western Suburbs Magpies	Sunday, 26 May, 3:00pm	HE Laybutt Field	Martin Jones
Newcastle Knights (B)		BYE

Round 13

Home	Score	Away	Match Information
Home	Score	Away	Date and Time	Venue	Referee	Video
Parramatta Eels (B)	18 – 34	Newtown Jets	Thursday, 30 May, 5:20pm	CommBank Stadium	Mitch Currie
Newcastle Knights (B)	38 – 16	Canterbury-Bankstown Bulldogs (B)	Friday, 31 May, 5:30pm	McDonald Jones Stadium	Jake Sutherland
South Sydney Rabbitohs (B)	30 – 8	Western Suburbs Magpies	Saturday, 1 June, 3:00pm	Redfern Oval	Martin Jones
Penrith Panthers (B)	10 – 26	St George Illawarra Dragons (B)	Saturday, 1 June, 3:15pm	BlueBet Stadium	Damian Brady
Blacktown Workers Sea Eagles	22 – 28	North Sydney Bears	Sunday, 2 June, 3:00pm	HE Laybutt Field	Kieren Irons
Sydney Roosters (B)	16 – 24	New Zealand Warriors (B)	Sunday, 2 June, 3:00pm	Wentworth Park	Daniel Luttringer
Canberra Raiders (B)		BYE

Round 14

Home	Score	Away	Match Information
Home	Score	Away	Date and Time	Venue	Referee	Video
St George Illawarra Dragons (B)	14 – 18	Parramatta Eels (B)	Friday, 7 June, 5:40pm	WIN Stadium	Daniel Luttringer
Western Suburbs Magpies	20 – 22	Canberra Raiders (B)	Saturday, 8 June, 2:00pm	Lidcombe Oval	Karra-Lee Nolan
Newtown Jets	38 – 4	Sydney Roosters (B)	Saturday, 8 June, 3:00pm	Henson Park	Jake Sutherland
Penrith Panthers (B)	16 – 22	North Sydney Bears	Sunday, 9 June, 1:40pm	BlueBet Stadium	Kieren Irons
Newcastle Knights (B)	16 – 36	Blacktown Workers Sea Eagles	Sunday, 9 June, 2:30pm	Newcastle Centre of Excellence	Martin Jones
Canterbury-Bankstown Bulldogs (B)	46 – 4	South Sydney Rabbitohs (B)	Monday, 10 June, 1:40pm	Accor Stadium	Damian Brady
New Zealand Warriors (B)		BYE

Round 15

Home	Score	Away	Match Information
Home	Score	Away	Date and Time	Venue	Referee	Video
Western Suburbs Magpies	6 – 36	New Zealand Warriors (B)	Saturday, 15 June, 12:40pm	Leichhardt Oval	Kieren Irons
South Sydney Rabbitohs (B)	18 – 18	Canberra Raiders (B)	Saturday, 15 June, 2:00pm	Redfern Oval	Martin Jones
Newtown Jets	12 – 16	North Sydney Bears	Saturday, 15 June, 3:00pm	Henson Park	Jake Sutherland
Parramatta Eels (B)	28 – 20	Sydney Roosters (B)	Saturday, 15 June, 5:05pm	CommBank Stadium	Karra-Lee Nolan
Newcastle Knights (B)	42 – 22	Penrith Panthers (B)	Sunday, 16 June, 1:40pm	McDonald Jones Stadium	Ziggy Prezeklasa-Adamski
Blacktown Workers Sea Eagles	26 – 14	St George Illawarra Dragons (B)	Sunday, 16 June, 3:00pm	HE Laybutt Field	Clayton Wills
Canterbury-Bankstown Bulldogs (B)		BYE

Round 16

Home	Score	Away	Match Information
Home	Score	Away	Date and Time	Venue	Referee	Video
New Zealand Warriors (B)	18 – 4	St George Illawarra Dragons (B)	Saturday, 22 June, 12:00pm	North Harbour Stadium	Paki Parkinson
Penrith Panthers (B)	16 – 20	Newtown Jets	Saturday, 22 June, 2:00pm	BlueBet Stadium	Damian Brady
Parramatta Eels (B)	0 – 30	Canberra Raiders (B)	Saturday, 22 June, 3:00pm	Eric Tweedale Stadium	Kieren Irons
Sydney Roosters (B)	0 – 36	Newcastle Knights (B)	Saturday, 22 June, 3:00pm	Industree Group Stadium	Jake Sutherland
South Sydney Rabbitohs (B)	20 – 42	Blacktown Workers Sea Eagles	Saturday, 22 June, 5:10pm	Accor Stadium	Cameron Turner
Western Suburbs Magpies	16 – 38	Canterbury-Bankstown Bulldogs (B)	Sunday, 23 June, 1:35pm	Campbelltown Sports Stadium	Daniel Luttringer
North Sydney Bears		BYE

Round 17

Home	Score	Away	Match Information
Home	Score	Away	Date and Time	Venue	Referee	Video
New Zealand Warriors (B)	24 – 18	Canberra Raiders (B)	Saturday, 29 June, 12:40pm	Go Media Stadium	Clayton Wills
Western Suburbs Magpies	6 – 30	Penrith Panthers (B)	Saturday, 29 June, 2:00pm	Lidcombe Oval	Daniel Luttringer
Sydney Roosters (B)	32 – 18	Newtown Jets	Saturday, 29 June, 2:30pm	Wentworth Park	Martin Jones
Newcastle Knights (B)	8 – 30	Parramatta Eels (B)	Saturday, 29 June, 3:00pm	McDonald Jones Stadium	Cameron Turner
South Sydney Rabbitohs (B)	18 – 32	St George Illawarra Dragons (B)	Saturday, 29 June, 3:00pm	Redfern Oval	Jake Sutherland
North Sydney Bears	18 – 10	Canterbury-Bankstown Bulldogs (B)	Sunday, 30 June, 3:00pm	North Sydney Oval	Karra-Lee Nolan
Blacktown Workers Sea Eagles		BYE

Round 18

Home	Score	Away	Match Information
Home	Score	Away	Date and Time	Venue	Referee	Video
Parramatta Eels (B)	20 – 16	South Sydney Rabbitohs (B)	Thursday, 4 July, 5:20pm	CommBank Stadium	Wyatt Raymond
Canterbury-Bankstown Bulldogs (B)	46 – 16	New Zealand Warriors (B)	Saturday, 6 July, 12:40pm	Accor Stadium	Damian Brady
Newtown Jets	32 – 24	Western Suburbs Magpies	Saturday, 6 July, 3:00pm	Henson Park	Jake Sutherland
Sydney Roosters (B)	14 – 18	St George Illawarra Dragons (B)	Sunday, 7 July, 11:30am	Allianz Stadium	Clayton Wills
Canberra Raiders (B)	38 – 24	Newcastle Knights (B)	Sunday, 7 July, 1:40pm	GIO Stadium	Cameron Turner
North Sydney Bears	28 – 10	Blacktown Workers Sea Eagles	Sunday, 7 July, 3:00pm	North Sydney Oval	Kieren Irons
Penrith Panthers (B)		BYE

Round 19

Home	Score	Away	Match Information
Home	Score	Away	Date and Time	Venue	Referee	Video
Penrith Panthers (B)	24 – 26	Canberra Raiders (B)	Saturday, 13 July, 2:00pm	BlueBet Stadium	Clayton Wills
Newtown Jets	44 – 18	Canterbury-Bankstown Bulldogs (B)	Saturday, 13 July, 3:00pm	Henson Park	Kieren Irons
Parramatta Eels (B)	28 – 46	New Zealand Warriors (B)	Saturday, 13 July, 3:00pm	Lidcombe Oval	Jake Sutherland
Blacktown Workers Sea Eagles	14 – 26	Newcastle Knights (B)	Sunday, 14 July, 1:45pm	4 Pines Park	Daniel Luttringer
South Sydney Rabbitohs (B)	20 – 22	North Sydney Bears	Sunday, 14 July, 3:00pm	Coogee Oval	Cameron Turner
Sydney Roosters (B)	4 – 44	Western Suburbs Magpies	Sunday, 14 July, 3:00pm	Wentworth Park	Luke Saldern
St George Illawarra Dragons (B)		BYE

Round 20

Home	Score	Away	Match Information
Home	Score	Away	Date and Time	Venue	Referee
Canterbury-Bankstown Bulldogs (B)	32 – 22	Parramatta Eels (B)	Friday, 19 July, 8:00pm	Belmore Sports Ground	Damian Brady
South Sydney Rabbitohs (B)	44 – 24	Sydney Roosters (B)	Saturday, 20 July, 12:40pm	Industree Group Stadium	Jake Sutherland
Canberra Raiders (B)	12 – 20	North Sydney Bears	Saturday, 20 July, 2:00pm	Raiders Belconnen	Cameron Turner
Newcastle Knights (B)	34 – 24	Newtown Jets	Saturday, 20 July, 3:00pm	McDonald Jones Stadium	Luke Saldern
Penrith Panthers (B)	48 – 18	Blacktown Workers Sea Eagles	Sunday, 21 July, 11:45am	BlueBet Stadium	Kieren Irons
St George Illawarra Dragons (B)	52 – 16	Western Suburbs Magpies	Sunday, 21 July, 1:00pm	Collegians Sporting Complex	Daniel Luttringer
New Zealand Warriors (B)		BYE

Round 21

Home	Score	Away	Match Information
Home	Score	Away	Date and Time	Venue	Referee	Video
New Zealand Warriors (B)	14 – 20	Western Suburbs Magpies	Friday, 26 July, 3:15pm	Go Media Stadium	Cameron Turner
Canterbury-Bankstown Bulldogs (B)	32 – 10	North Sydney Bears	Saturday, 27 July, 12:00pm	Belmore Sports Ground	Kieren Irons
St George Illawarra Dragons (B)	24 – 30	Penrith Panthers (B)	Saturday, 27 July, 12:00pm	Collegians Sporting Complex	Jake Sutherland
Newtown Jets	30 – 16	Parramatta Eels (B)	Saturday, 27 July, 3:00pm	Henson Park	Martin Jones
Sydney Roosters (B)	58 – 6	Blacktown Workers Sea Eagles	Sunday, 28 July, 3:00pm	Wentworth Park	Chris Sutton
Canberra Raiders (B)	56 – 16	South Sydney Rabbitohs (B)	Sunday, 28 July, 3:50pm	GIO Stadium	Mitch Currie
Newcastle Knights (B)		BYE

Round 22

Home	Score	Away	Match Information
Home	Score	Away	Date and Time	Venue	Referee	Video
New Zealand Warriors (B)	46 – 10	Parramatta Eels (B)	Friday, 2 August, 3:15pm	Go Media Stadium	Paki Parkinson
Western Suburbs Magpies	6 – 64	Sydney Roosters (B)	Saturday, 3 August, 2:00pm	Lidcombe Oval	Mitch Currie
Newtown Jets	38 – 16	South Sydney Rabbitohs (B)	Saturday, 3 August, 3:00pm	Henson Park	Martin Jones
Penrith Panthers (B)	40 – 26	Newcastle Knights (B)	Sunday, 4 August, 11:35am	BlueBet Stadium	Clayton Wills
Canterbury-Bankstown Bulldogs (B)	22 – 12	Canberra Raiders (B)	Sunday, 4 August, 1:45pm	Belmore Sports Ground	Kieren Irons
North Sydney Bears	20 – 32	St George Illawarra Dragons (B)	Sunday, 4 August, 3:00pm	North Sydney Oval	Damian Brady
Blacktown Workers Sea Eagles		BYE

Round 23

Home	Score	Away	Match Information
Home	Score	Away	Date and Time	Venue	Referee	Video
Parramatta Eels (B)	22 – 22	Penrith Panthers (B)	Friday, 9 August, 5:30pm	CommBank Stadium	Daniel Luttringer
Canberra Raiders (B)	52 – 12	Blacktown Workers Sea Eagles	Saturday, 10 August, 5:15pm	GIO Stadium	Clayton Wills
St George Illawarra Dragons (B)	30 – 6	Canterbury-Bankstown Bulldogs (B)	Saturday, 10 August, 5:15pm	Netstrada Jubilee Stadium	Mitch Currie
New Zealand Warriors (B)	28 – 10	South Sydney Rabbitohs (B)	Sunday, 11 August, 10:00am	North Harbour Stadium	Paki Parkinson
Newcastle Knights (B)	14 – 22	Western Suburbs Magpies	Sunday, 11 August, 1:30pm	McDonald Jones Stadium	Martin Jones
North Sydney Bears	8 – 18	Newtown Jets	Sunday, 11 August, 3:00pm	North Sydney Oval	Damian Brady
Sydney Roosters (B)		BYE

Round 24

Home	Score	Away	Match Information
Home	Score	Away	Date and Time	Venue	Referee	Video
Blacktown Workers Sea Eagles	28 – 22	New Zealand Warriors (B)	Saturday, 17 August, 12:30pm	4 Pines Park	Ziggy Prezeklasa-Adamski
Parramatta Eels (B)	34 – 42	Newcastle Knights (B)	Saturday, 17 August, 5:00pm	Eric Tweedale Stadium	Kasey Badger
Western Suburbs Magpies	14 – 28	South Sydney Rabbitohs (B)	Saturday, 17 August, 5:15pm	Campbelltown Sports Stadium	Kieren Irons
St George Illawarra Dragons (B)	12 – 28	Canberra Raiders (B)	Sunday, 18 August, 1:00pm	Collegians Sporting Complex	Clayton Wills
North Sydney Bears	24 – 24	Penrith Panthers (B)	Sunday, 18 August, 3:00pm	North Sydney Oval	Martin Jones
Sydney Roosters (B)	23 – 22	Canterbury-Bankstown Bulldogs (B)	Sunday, 18 August, 3:00pm	Wentworth Park	Mitch Currie
Newtown Jets		BYE

Round 25

Home	Score	Away	Match Information
Home	Score	Away	Date and Time	Venue	Referee	Video
New Zealand Warriors (B)	42 – 10	Canterbury-Bankstown Bulldogs (B)	Friday, 23 August, 3:15pm	Go Media Stadium	Paki Parkinson
St George Illawarra Dragons (B)	34 – 24	Newtown Jets	Saturday, 24 August, 1:00pm	Collegians Sporting Complex	Cameron Turner
Western Suburbs Magpies	40 – 36	Blacktown Workers Sea Eagles	Saturday, 24 August, 2:00pm	Lidcombe Oval	Tom Stindl
South Sydney Rabbitohs (B)	24 – 36	Newcastle Knights (B)	Saturday, 24 August, 5:10pm	Accor Stadium	Michael Ford
Canberra Raiders (B)	24 – 26	Penrith Panthers (B)	Saturday, 24 August, 5:15pm	GIO Stadium	Kieren Irons
Sydney Roosters (B)	24 – 20	North Sydney Bears	Sunday, 25 August, 3:00pm	Wentworth Park	Mitch Currie
Parramatta Eels (B)		BYE

Round 26

Home	Score	Away	Match Information
Home	Score	Away	Date and Time	Venue	Referee	Video
Penrith Panthers (B)	32 – 28	South Sydney Rabbitohs (B)	Friday, 30 August, 5:45pm	BlueBet Stadium	Damian Brady
Parramatta Eels (B)	12 – 38	St George Illawarra Dragons (B)	Saturday, 31 August, 10:45am	CommBank Stadium	Tom Stindl
Canterbury-Bankstown Bulldogs (B)	40 – 30	Blacktown Workers Sea Eagles	Saturday, 31 August, 2:15pm	Belmore Sports Ground	Michael Ford
Newtown Jets	39 – 36	New Zealand Warriors (B)	Saturday, 31 August, 3:00pm	Henson Park	Luke Saldern
North Sydney Bears	30 – 24	Newcastle Knights (B)	Saturday, 31 August, 7:30pm	North Sydney Oval	Kieren Irons
Sydney Roosters (B)	34 – 21	Canberra Raiders (B)	Sunday, 1 September, 12:00pm	Wentworth Park	Cameron Turner
Western Suburbs Magpies		BYE

==== Finals Series ====
Qualifying Final
2	Newtown	38
3	Canberra	16
4	New Zealand	12
5	Penrith	24

Major Semi-Final
1	North Sydney	18
2	Newtown	16
Minor Semi-Final
3	Canberra	30
5	Penrith	14

Preliminary Final
2	Newtown	18
3	Canberra	16

Grand Final
1	North Sydney
2	Newtown

Home	Score	Away	Match Information
Home	Score	Away	Date and Time	Venue	Referee	Video
Qualifying & Elimination Finals
New Zealand Warriors (B)	12 – 24	Penrith Panthers (B)	Saturday, 7 September, 1:00pm	Leichhardt Oval	Kieren Irons
Newtown Jets	38 – 16	Canberra Raiders (B)	Saturday, 7 September, 5:00pm	Leichhardt Oval	Damian Brady
Major & Minor Semi-Finals
Canberra Raiders (B)	30 – 14	Penrith Panthers (B)	Sunday, 15 September, 1:00pm	Leichhardt Oval	Damian Brady
North Sydney Bears	18 – 16	Newtown Jets	Sunday, 15 September, 5:00pm	Leichhardt Oval	Kieren Irons
Preliminary Final
Newtown Jets	18 – 16	Canberra Raiders (B)	Saturday, 21 September, 1:00pm	Leichhardt Oval	Kieren Irons
Grand Final
North Sydney Bears	22 – 28	Newtown Jets	Sunday, 29 September, 3:00pm	CommBank Stadium	Kieren Irons

=== Harvey Norman NSW Women's Premiership ===
The New South Wales Women's Premiership is the statewide premier women's competition. It feeds directly into the National Rugby League Women's Premiership.

==== Teams ====
Colours	Club	Home ground(s)	Head coach
	Canterbury-Bankstown Bulldogs	Belmore Sports Ground	Blake Cavallaro
	Central Coast Roosters	Morry Breen Oval, Woy Woy Oval	Nathan Anderson
	Cronulla-Sutherland Sharks	PointsBet Stadium	Robert Capizzi
	Illawarra Steelers	Collegians Sporting Complex	Jamie Szczerbanik
	Manly Warringah Sea Eagles	HE Laybutt Field, 4 Pines Park	Keith Hanley
	Mount Pritchard Mounties	Aubrey Keech Reserve	Sa Patiole
	Newcastle Knights	Newcastle Centre of Excellence	Rob Taylor
	Parramatta Eels	Eric Tweedale Stadium	Scott Fava
	South Sydney Rabbitohs	Redfern Oval	Jason Dorahy
	St George Dragons	Netstrada Jubilee Stadium, Hurstville Oval	Steve Kelly
	Wentworthville Magpies	Ringrose Park	Lino Salafai
	Wests Tigers	Concord Oval	Scott Clark

Note:

- Wentworthville Magpies, as well as the Parramatta, have a feeder club arrangement with the Parramatta Eels NRLW team.
- Manly Warringah Sea Eagles have a feeder club arrangement with the Gold Coast Titans NRLW team.

==== Ladder ====
Pos	Team	Pld	W	D	L	B	PF	PA	PD	Pts
1	Wentworthville Magpies (W)	11	10	0	1	0	302	106	+196	20
2	Illawarra Steelers (W)	11	9	0	2	0	344	108	+236	18
3	Mount Pritchard Mounties (W)	11	7	1	3	0	185	204	–19	15
4	Newcastle Knights (WB)	11	7	0	4	0	284	168	+116	14
5	Canterbury-Bankstown Bulldogs (W)	11	6	0	5	0	214	214	+0	12
6	Parramatta Eels (WB)	11	4	0	7	0	172	224	–52	8
7	Cronulla-Sutherland Sharks (WB)	11	4	0	7	0	178	262	–84	8
8	St George Dragons (W)	11	4	0	7	0	134	222	–88	8
9	South Sydney Rabbitohs (W)	11	4	0	7	0	154	254	-100	8
10	Wests Tigers (WB)	11	3	1	7	0	176	225	–49	7
11	Manly Warringah Sea Eagles (W)	11	3	1	7	0	168	223	–55	7
12	Central Coast Roosters (W)	11	3	1	7	0	167	268	-101	7

Updated to match(es) played on 15 September. Source:
Rules for classification: 1) points; 2) point difference; 3) points scored

===== Ladder progression =====
- Numbers highlighted in green indicate that the team finished the round inside the top 4.
- Numbers highlighted in blue indicates the team finished first on the ladder in that round.
- Numbers highlighted in red indicates the team finished last place on the ladder in that round.

Pos	Team	1	2	3	4	5	6	7	8	9	10	11
1	Wentworthville Magpies (W)	2	4	6	8	10	12	14	16	16	18	20
2	Illawarra Steelers (W)	0	2	4	6	8	8	10	12	14	16	18
3	Mount Pritchard Mounties (W)	2	2	4	5	7	7	9	9	11	13	15
4	Newcastle Knights (WB)	0	2	2	4	6	8	8	10	12	12	14
5	Canterbury-Bankstown Bulldogs (W)	2	4	4	4	6	8	8	8	10	12	12
6	Parramatta Eels (WB)	2	2	2	4	4	4	4	4	6	6	8
7	Cronulla-Sutherland Sharks (WB)	2	2	2	2	4	4	4	4	4	6	8
8	St George Dragons (W)	0	2	4	4	4	6	8	8	8	8	8
9	South Sydney Rabbitohs (W)	2	2	4	4	4	4	4	6	8	8	8
10	Wests Tigers (WB)	0	0	0	1	1	1	3	5	5	7	7
11	Manly Warringah Sea Eagles (W)	0	1	3	5	5	7	7	7	7	7	7
12	Central Coast Roosters (W)	0	1	1	1	1	3	5	7	7	7	7

Season Results:

Round 1

Home	Score	Away	Match Information
Home	Score	Away	Date and Time	Venue	Referee	Video
Mount Pritchard Mounties (W)	8 – 4	Illawarra Steelers (W)	Saturday, 6 July, 11:00am	Aubrey Keech Reserve	Olivia Lawne
Wests Tigers (WB)	18 – 24	Cronulla-Sutherland Sharks (WB)	Saturday, 6 July, 11:00am	Henson Park	Jabril Daizli
South Sydney Rabbitohs (W)	22 – 10	Central Coast Roosters (W)	Saturday, 6 July, 3:00pm	Redfern Oval	Curtis Robinson
Manly Warringah Sea Eagles (W)	10 – 18	Parramatta Eels (WB)	Saturday, 6 July, 3:00pm	4 Pines Park	Isaac El-Hassan
Wentworthville Magpies (W)	36 – 0	St George Dragons (W)	Sunday, 7 July, 11:15am	Ringrose Park	Ryan Micallef
Canterbury-Bankstown Bulldogs (W)	34 – 12	Newcastle Knights (WB)	Sunday, 7 July, 2:00pm	Belmore Sports Ground	William Damato

Round 2

Home	Score	Away	Match Information
Home	Score	Away	Date and Time	Venue	Referee	Video
Parramatta Eels (WB)	14 – 20	St George Dragons (W)	Saturday, 13 July, 10:30am	Eric Tweedale Stadium	Curtis Robinson
Newcastle Knights (WB)	40 – 4	Mount Pritchard Mounties (W)	Saturday, 13 July, 1:00pm	Newcastle Centre of Excellence	Jack Fisher
Central Coast Roosters (W)	14 – 14	Manly Warringah Sea Eagles (W)	Sunday, 14 July, 11:00am	Woy Woy Oval	Lachlan Bryant
Cronulla-Sutherland Sharks (WB)	10 – 38	Wentworthville Magpies (W)	Sunday, 14 July, 11:00am	PointsBet Stadium	Ryan Micallef
Illawarra Steelers (W)	50 – 6	Wests Tigers (WB)	Sunday, 14 July, 2:00pm	Collegians Sporting Complex	William Damato
Canterbury-Bankstown Bulldogs (W)	30 – 8	South Sydney Rabbitohs (W)	Monday, 15 July, 7:00pm	NSWRL Centre of Excellence	Isaac El-Hassan

Round 3

Home	Score	Away	Match Information
Home	Score	Away	Date and Time	Venue	Referee	Video
Central Coast Roosters (W)	10 – 36	Wentworthville Magpies (W)	Saturday, 20 July, 11:00am	Woy Woy Oval	Harrison Bayssari
Canterbury-Bankstown Bulldogs (W)	14 – 20	St George Dragons (W)	Saturday, 20 July, 11:30am	Belmore Sports Ground	Olivia Lawne
South Sydney Rabbitohs (W)	20 – 14	Wests Tigers (WB)	Saturday, 20 July, 1:00pm	Redfern Oval	Mitchell Pitscheider
Mount Pritchard Mounties (W)	20 – 14	Cronulla-Sutherland Sharks (WB)	Saturday, 20 July, 3:00pm	Aubrey Keech Reserve	Lukas Durrant
Manly Warringah Sea Eagles (W)	24 – 20	Newcastle Knights (WB)	Sunday, 21 July, 1:45pm	4 Pines Park	Curtis Robinson
Illawarra Steelers (W)	42 – 24	Parramatta Eels (WB)	Sunday, 21 July, 3:00pm	Collegians Sporting Complex	Ryan Micallef

Round 4

Home	Score	Away	Match Information
Home	Score	Away	Date and Time	Venue	Referee	Video
St George Dragons (W)	6 – 24	Manly Warringah Sea Eagles (W)	Saturday, 27 July, 12:00pm	Netstrada Jubilee Stadium	Gage Miles
Wentworthville Magpies (W)	28 – 0	Canterbury-Bankstown Bulldogs (W)	Sunday, 28 July, 11:15am	Ringrose Park	Brayden Hunt
Wests Tigers (WB)	16 – 16	Mount Pritchard Mounties (W)	Sunday, 28 July, 11:30am	Campbelltown Sports Stadium	William Damato
Cronulla-Sutherland Sharks (WB)	12 – 40	Illawarra Steelers (W)	Sunday, 28 July, 12:00pm	Sharks Academy Fields	Adam Sirianni
Parramatta Eels (WB)	18 – 14	South Sydney Rabbitohs (W)	Sunday, 28 July, 1:00pm	Eric Tweedale Stadium	Lachlan Greenfield
Newcastle Knights (WB)	26 – 22	Central Coast Roosters (W)	Monday, 29 July, 7:00pm	NSWRL Centre of Excellence	Jack Fisher

Round 5

Home	Score	Away	Match Information
Home	Score	Away	Date and Time	Venue	Referee	Video
Central Coast Roosters (W)	0 – 36	Illawarra Steelers (W)	Saturday, 3 August, 12:00pm	EDSACC Oval	Olivia Lawne
Mount Pritchard Mounties (W)	24 – 18	South Sydney Rabbitohs (W)	Saturday, 3 August, 1:00pm	GIO Stadium	Gage Miles
St George Dragons (W)	0 – 20	Newcastle Knights (WB)	Saturday, 3 August, 3:15pm	Hurtsville Oval	Curtis Robinson
Wentworthville Magpies (W)	18 – 10	Manly Warringah Sea Eagles (W)	Saturday, 3 August, 4:00pm	Ringrose Park	Ryan Micallef
Wests Tigers (WB)	20 – 24	Canterbury-Bankstown Bulldogs (W)	Sunday, 4 August, 2:00pm	Concord Oval	Rhianna Boag
Cronulla-Sutherland Sharks (WB)	28 – 16	Parramatta Eels (WB)	Monday, 5 August, 7:00pm	NSWRL Centre of Excellence	Isaac El-Hassan

Round 6

Home	Score	Away	Match Information
Home	Score	Away	Date and Time	Venue	Referee	Video
Central Coast Roosters (W)	15 – 14	Wests Tigers (WB)	Saturday, 10 August, 12:50pm	Industree Group Stadium	Olivia Lawne
Illawarra Steelers (W)	16 – 26	Wentworthville Magpies (W)	Saturday, 10 August, 2:00pm	Sid Parrish Park	Rhianna Boag
St George Dragons (W)	24 – 12	Mount Pritchard Mounties (W)	Saturday, 10 August, 3:15pm	Hurtsville Oval	Harrison Bayssari
Newcastle Knights (WB)	44 – 14	Cronulla-Sutherland Sharks (WB)	Sunday, 11 August, 12:00pm	Newcastle Centre of Excellence	Isaac El-Hassan
Manly Warringah Sea Eagles (W)	28 – 4	South Sydney Rabbitohs (W)	Sunday, 11 August, 12:00pm	HE Laybutt Field	William Damato
Parramatta Eels (WB)	14 – 34	Canterbury-Bankstown Bulldogs (W)	Sunday, 11 August, 1:00pm	Eric Tweedale Stadium	Ryan Micallef

Round 7

Home	Score	Away	Match Information
Home	Score	Away	Date and Time	Venue	Referee	Video
Canterbury-Bankstown Bulldogs (W)	20 – 24	Central Coast Roosters (W)	Saturday, 17 August, 11:00am	Belmore Sports Ground	Olivia Lawne
South Sydney Rabbitohs (W)	6 – 40	Wentworthville Magpies (W)	Saturday, 17 August, 12:00pm	Redfern Oval	Rhianna Boag
Mount Pritchard Mounties (W)	19 – 18	Manly Warringah Sea Eagles (W)	Saturday, 17 August, 1:00pm	Aubrey Keech Reserve	Curtis Robinson
Newcastle Knights (WB)	16 – 22	Illawarra Steelers (W)	Saturday, 17 August, 1:00pm	Newcastle Centre of Excellence	Harrison Bayssari
St George Dragons (W)	22 – 4	Cronulla-Sutherland Sharks (WB)	Saturday, 17 August, 3:15pm	Hurtsville Oval	Ryan Micallef
Wests Tigers (WB)	12 – 10	Parramatta Eels (WB)	Monday, 19 August, 7:00pm	NSWRL Centre of Excellence	William Damato

Round 8

Home	Score	Away	Match Information
Home	Score	Away	Date and Time	Venue	Referee	Video
South Sydney Rabbitohs (W)	34 – 6	Cronulla-Sutherland Sharks (WB)	Saturday, 24 August, 12:00pm	Redfern Oval	Olivia Lawne
Parramatta Eels (WB)	12 – 22	Newcastle Knights (WB)	Saturday, 24 August, 1:30pm	Eric Tweedale Stadium	Rhianna Boag
Illawarra Steelers (W)	30 – 4	Canterbury-Bankstown Bulldogs (W)	Saturday, 24 August, 3:00pm	Collegians Sporting Complex	Ryan Micallef
St George Dragons (W)	20 – 26	Central Coast Roosters (W)	Saturday, 24 August, 3:15pm	Hurtsville Oval	Harrison Bayssari
Wests Tigers (WB)	44 – 20	Manly Warringah Sea Eagles (W)	Sunday, 25 August, 11:30am	Leichhardt Oval	William Damato
Wentworthville Magpies (W)	20 – 4	Mount Pritchard Mounties (W)	Monday, 26 August, 7:00pm	NSWRL Centre of Excellence	Curtis Robinson

Round 9

Home	Score	Away	Match Information
Home	Score	Away	Date and Time	Venue	Referee	Video
Canterbury-Bankstown Bulldogs (W)	18 – 10	Cronulla-Sutherland Sharks (WB)	Saturday, 31 August, 10:00am	Belmore Sports Ground	Isaac El-Hassan
Mount Pritchard Mounties (W)	28 – 24	Central Coast Roosters (W)	Saturday, 31 August, 11:00am	Aubrey Keech Reserve	Harrison Bayssari
Newcastle Knights (WB)	20 – 4	Wests Tigers (WB)	Saturday, 31 August, 1:00pm	Newcastle Centre of Excellence	Olivia Lawne
St George Dragons (W)	12 – 18	South Sydney Rabbitohs (W)	Saturday, 31 August, 3:15pm	Hurtsville Oval	Rhianna Boag
Wentworthville Magpies (W)	10 – 12	Parramatta Eels (WB)	Saturday, 31 August, 6:00pm	Ringrose Park	Matt Galvin
Manly Warringah Sea Eagles (W)	0 – 32	Illawarra Steelers (W)	Sunday, 1 September, 12:00pm	4 Pines Park	Balunn Simon

Round 10

Home	Score	Away	Match Information
Home	Score	Away	Date and Time	Venue	Referee	Video
Newcastle Knights (WB)	24 – 28	Wentworthville Magpies (W)	Saturday, 7 September, 1:00pm	Newcastle Centre of Excellence	Jack Fisher
Wests Tigers (WB)	14 – 4	St George Dragons (W)	Saturday, 7 September, 2:00pm	Lidcombe Oval	Harrison Bayssari
Illawarra Steelers (W)	32 – 6	South Sydney Rabbitohs (W)	Saturday, 7 September, 3:00pm	Ziems Park	Aidan Richardson
Canterbury-Bankstown Bulldogs (W)	22 – 14	Manly Warringah Sea Eagles (W)	Saturday, 7 September, 3:00pm	Accor Stadium	Olivia Lawne
Cronulla-Sutherland Sharks (WB)	30 – 6	Central Coast Roosters (W)	Sunday, 8 September, 12:00pm	PointsBet Stadium	Curtis Robinson
Parramatta Eels (WB)	12 – 16	Mount Pritchard Mounties (W)	Sunday, 8 September, 4:00pm	Eric Tweedale Stadium	Ryan Micallef

Round 11

Home	Score	Away	Match Information
Home	Score	Away	Date and Time	Venue	Referee	Video
South Sydney Rabbitohs (W)	4 – 40	Newcastle Knights (WB)	Friday, 13 September, 6:30pm	Accor Stadium	Olivia Lawne
Canterbury-Bankstown Bulldogs (W)	14 – 34	Mount Pritchard Mounties (W)	Saturday, 14 September, 11:00am	Belmore Sports Ground	Curtis Robinson
Wentworthville Magpies (W)	22 – 14	Wests Tigers (WB)	Saturday, 14 September, 11:00am	Ringrose Park	Rhianna Boag
Illawarra Steelers (W)	40 – 6	St George Dragons (W)	Saturday, 14 September, 4:00pm	Rex Jackson Park	Ryan Micallef
Central Coast Roosters (W)	16 – 22	Parramatta Eels (WB)	Sunday, 15 September, 9:45am	Industree Group Stadium	Jabril Daizli
Manly Warringah Sea Eagles (W)	6 – 26	Cronulla-Sutherland Sharks (WB)	Sunday, 15 September, 12:00pm	HE Laybutt Field	Harrison Bayssari

==== Finals Series ====
Semi-Finals
1	Wentworthville	18
4	Newcastle	20
2	Illawarra	30
3	Mount Pritchard	16

Grand Final
2	Illawarra
4	Newcastle

Home	Score	Away	Match Information
Home	Score	Away	Date and Time	Venue	Referee	Video
Semi-Finals
Wentworthville Magpies (W)	18 – 20	Newcastle Knights (WB)	Saturday, 21 September, 3:00pm	Leichhardt Oval	Cameron Turner
Illawarra Steelers (W)	30 – 16	Mount Pritchard Mounties (W)	Saturday, 21 September, 4:45pm	Leichhardt Oval	Mitchell Currie
Grand Final
Illawarra Steelers (W)	10 – 6	Newcastle Knights (WB)	Sunday, 29 September, 1:00pm	CommBank Stadium	Mitchell Currie

== Tier 2 ==
=== Leagues Clubs Australia Ron Massey Cup ===
The Ron Massey Cup is the State's second tier men's competition. It feeds into the New South Wales Cup.

==== Teams ====
Colours	Club	Home ground(s)	Head coach
	Canterbury-Bankstown Bulldogs	Hammondville Oval	TBA
	Glebe Dirty Reds	Wentworth Park	TBA
	Hills District Bulls	Crestwood Reserve	TBA
	Mount Pritchard Mounties	Aubrey Keech Reserve	TBA
	Penrith Brothers	Parker Street Reserve	TBA
	Ryde-Eastwood Hawks	TG Milner Field	TBA
	St Marys Saints	St Marys Leagues Stadium	TBA
	Wentworthville Magpies	Ringrose Park	TBA

==== Ladder ====
Pos	Team	Pld	W	D	L	B	PF	PA	PD	Pts
1	St Marys Saints	18	15	0	3	2	526	321	+205	34
2	Mount Pritchard Mounties	18	11	1	6	2	414	412	+2	27
3	Wentworthville Magpies	18	11	0	7	2	496	307	+189	26
4	Glebe Dirty Reds	18	11	0	7	2	561	430	+131	26
5	Ryde-Eastwood Hawks	18	8	1	9	2	396	410	–14	21
6	Penrith Brothers	18	6	1	11	2	343	533	-190	17
7	Canterbury-Bankstown Bulldogs (C)	18	5	1	12	2	390	502	-112	15
8	Hills District Bulls	18	3	0	15	2	334	545	-211	10

Updated to match(es) played on 18 August. Source:
Rules for classification: 1) points; 2) point difference; 3) points scored

===== Ladder progression =====
- Numbers highlighted in green indicate that the team finished the round inside the top 5.
- Numbers highlighted in blue indicates the team finished first on the ladder in that round.
- Numbers highlighted in red indicates the team finished last place on the ladder in that round.

Pos	Team	1	2	4	5	6	7	8	9	10	11	12	13	3	14	15	16	17	18	19	20
1	St Marys Saints	2	4	6	8	8	10	12	12	16	18	20	22	22	24	26	28	30	32	34	34
2	Mount Pritchard Mounties	0	2	4	6	8	8	9	11	11	11	13	13	15	17	19	21	21	23	25	27
3	Wentworthville Magpies	2	4	6	6	6	8	10	12	14	14	16	16	16	18	18	20	20	22	24	26
4	Glebe Dirty Reds	2	4	6	8	10	10	10	12	14	16	16	18	18	20	20	20	22	22	24	26
5	Ryde-Eastwood Hawks	2	2	6	8	10	10	11	11	11	13	15	17	17	17	17	17	19	19	19	21
6	Penrith Brothers	0	0	2	2	4	6	8	8	10	10	10	10	10	12	14	15	17	17	17	17
7	Canterbury-Bankstown Bulldogs (C)	0	0	2	2	4	4	4	6	6	6	8	10	10	10	12	13	13	15	15	15
8	Hills District Bulls	0	0	0	0	2	4	4	4	4	6	8	8	8	10	10	10	10	10	10	10

Season Results:

Round 1

Home	Score	Away	Match Information
Home	Score	Away	Date and Time	Venue	Referee	Video
Mount Pritchard Mounties	6 – 24	St Marys Saints	Saturday, 16 March, 5:00pm	Aubrey Keech Reserve	Luke Saldern
Penrith Brothers	0 – 44	Wentworthville Magpies	Saturday, 16 March, 6:00pm	Parker Street Reserve	Cameron Turner
Canterbury-Bankstown Bulldogs (C)	18 – 22	Ryde-Eastwood Hawks	Saturday, 16 March, 6:30pm	Hammondville Oval	Dillan Wells
Hills District Bulls	10 – 35	Glebe Dirty Reds	Sunday, 17 March, 3:00pm	Hills Grammar	Karra-Lee Nolan

Round 2

Home	Score	Away	Match Information
Home	Score	Away	Date and Time	Venue	Referee	Video
Mount Pritchard Mounties	30 – 22	Penrith Brothers	Saturday, 23 March, 7:00pm	New Era Stadium	Luke Saldern
Glebe Dirty Reds	30 – 22	Ryde-Eastwood Hawks	Sunday, 24 March, 1:00pm	Wentworth Park	Karra-Lee Nolan
Hills District Bulls	6 – 19	Wentworthville Magpies	Sunday, 24 March, 3:00pm	Crestwood Reserve	Michael Ford
St Marys Saints	48 – 24	Canterbury-Bankstown Bulldogs (C)	Sunday, 24 March, 3:00pm	St Marys Leagues Stadium	Cameron Turner

Round 3

Home	Score	Away	Match Information
Home	Score	Away	Date and Time	Venue	Referee	Video
Glebe Dirty Reds	44 – 42	Canterbury-Bankstown Bulldogs (C)	Sunday, 7 April, 2:00pm	Wentworth Park	Michael Ford
Ryde-Eastwood Hawks	22 – 18	Wentworthville Magpies	Sunday, 7 April, 3:00pm	TG Milner Field	Cameron Turner
Penrith Brothers	16 – 24	St Marys Saints	Saturday, 8 June, 3:00pm	St Marys Leagues Stadium	TBA
Mount Pritchard Mounties	26 – 18	Hills District Bulls	Saturday, 6 July, 1:00pm	Aubrey Keech Reserve	Dillan Wells

Round 4

Home	Score	Away	Match Information
Home	Score	Away	Date and Time	Venue	Referee	Video
Mount Pritchard Mounties	28 – 22	Glebe Dirty Reds	Saturday, 13 April, 3:00pm	Aubrey Keech Reserve	Billy Greatbatch
Penrith Brothers	24 – 14	Hills District Bulls	Saturday, 13 April, 6:00pm	Parker Street Reserve	Luke Saldern
Wentworthville Magpies	BYE	St Marys Saints
Ryde-Eastwood Hawks	BYE	Canterbury-Bankstown Bulldogs (C)

Round 5

Home	Score	Away	Match Information
Home	Score	Away	Date and Time	Venue	Referee	Video
Glebe Dirty Reds	40 – 14	Penrith Brothers	Sunday, 21 April, 10:00am	St Marys Leagues Stadium	Billy Greatbatch
Mount Pritchard Mounties	34 – 22	Canterbury-Bankstown Bulldogs (C)	Sunday, 21 April, 12:00pm	St Marys Leagues Stadium	Tom Stindl
Ryde-Eastwood Hawks	31 – 30	Hills District Bulls	Sunday, 21 April, 2:00pm	St Marys Leagues Stadium	Dillan Wells
St Marys Saints	34 – 28	Wentworthville Magpies	Sunday, 21 April, 4:00pm	St Marys Leagues Stadium	Mitch Currie

Round 6

Home	Score	Away	Match Information
Home	Score	Away	Date and Time	Venue	Referee	Video
St Marys Saints	10 – 23	Ryde-Eastwood Hawks	Saturday, 27 April, 4:00pm	St Marys Leagues Stadium	Martin Jones
Canterbury-Bankstown Bulldogs (C)	18 – 12	Wentworthville Magpies	Saturday, 27 April, 6:30pm	Hammondville Oval	Dillan Wells
Penrith Brothers	BYE	Mount Pritchard Mounties
Glebe Dirty Reds	BYE	Hills District Bulls

Round 7

Home	Score	Away	Match Information
Home	Score	Away	Date and Time	Venue	Referee	Video
Canterbury-Bankstown Bulldogs (C)	10 – 24	Hills District Bulls	Saturday, 4 May, 6:30pm	Hammondville Oval	Tom Stindl
Wentworthville Magpies	54 – 0	Mount Pritchard Mounties	Sunday, 5 May, 2:00pm	Ringrose Park	Cameron Turner
Ryde-Eastwood Hawks	6 – 24	Penrith Brothers	Sunday, 5 May, 3:00pm	TG Milner Field	Billy Greatbatch
St Marys Saints	34 – 18	Glebe Dirty Reds	Sunday, 5 May, 3:00pm	St Marys Leagues Stadium	Luke Saldern

Round 8

Home	Score	Away	Match Information
Home	Score	Away	Date and Time	Venue	Referee	Video
St Marys Saints	30 – 10	Hills District Bulls	Saturday, 11 May, 4:00pm	St Marys Leagues Stadium	Cameron Turner
Penrith Brothers	32 – 12	Canterbury-Bankstown Bulldogs (C)	Saturday, 11 May, 6:00pm	Parker Street Reserve	Luke Saldern
Wentworthville Magpies	28 – 20	Glebe Dirty Reds	Sunday, 12 May, 2:00pm	Ringrose Park	Mitch Currie
Ryde-Eastwood Hawks	20 – 20	Mount Pritchard Mounties	Sunday, 12 May, 3:00pm	TG Milner Field	Karra-Lee Nolan

Round 9

Home	Score	Away	Match Information
Home	Score	Away	Date and Time	Venue	Referee	Video
Penrith Brothers	22 – 23	Wentworthville Magpies	Saturday, 25 May, 4:00pm	Parker Street Reserve	Karra-Lee Nolan
Mount Pritchard Mounties	32 – 18	St Marys Saints	Sunday, 26 May, 1:00pm	HE Laybutt Field	Dillan Wells
Hills District Bulls	20 – 36	Glebe Dirty Reds	Sunday, 26 May, 3:00pm	Crestwood Reserve	Cameron Turner
Ryde-Eastwood Hawks	18 – 22	Canterbury-Bankstown Bulldogs (C)	Sunday, 26 May, 3:00pm	TG Milner Field	Billy Greatbatch

Round 10

Home	Score	Away	Match Information
Home	Score	Away	Date and Time	Venue	Referee	Video
Penrith Brothers	22 – 18	Mount Pritchard Mounties	Saturday, 1 June, 3:00pm	Parker Street Reserve	Dillan Wells
Canterbury-Bankstown Bulldogs (C)	16 – 32	St Marys Saints	Saturday, 1 June, 5:00pm	St Marys Leagues Stadium	Karra-Lee Nolan
Hills District Bulls	10 – 30	Wentworthville Magpies	Friday, 7 June, 7:30pm	Kellyville Park	TBA
Glebe Dirty Reds	24 – 20	Ryde-Eastwood Hawks	Monday, 10 June, 2:00pm	Wentworth Park	TBA

Round 11

Home	Score	Away	Match Information
Home	Score	Away	Date and Time	Venue	Referee	Video
St Marys Saints	38 – 22	Penrith Brothers	Saturday, 15 June, 3:00pm	St Marys Leagues Stadium	Mitch Currie
Canterbury-Bankstown Bulldogs (C)	16 – 34	Glebe Dirty Reds	Saturday, 15 June, 6:30pm	Hammondville Oval	Billy Greatbatch
Hills District Bulls	30 – 20	Mount Pritchard Mounties	Sunday, 16 June, 3:00pm	Crestwood Reserve	Cameron Turner
Ryde-Eastwood Hawks	34 – 18	Wentworthville Magpies	Sunday, 16 June, 3:00pm	TG Milner Field	Dillan Wells

Round 12

Home	Score	Away	Match Information
Home	Score	Away	Date and Time	Venue	Referee	Video
Hills District Bulls	36 – 14	Penrith Brothers	Saturday, 22 June, 3:00pm	Crestwood Reserve	Billy Greatbatch
Glebe Dirty Reds	8 – 22	Mount Pritchard Mounties	Tuesday, 25 June, 7:45pm	Wentworth Park	Dillan Wells
Wentworthville Magpies	BYE	St Marys Saints
Ryde-Eastwood Hawks	BYE	Canterbury-Bankstown Bulldogs (C)

Round 13

Home	Score	Away	Match Information
Home	Score	Away	Date and Time	Venue	Referee	Video
Glebe Dirty Reds	50 – 8	Penrith Brothers	Saturday, 29 June, 12:20pm	Wentworth Park	Dillan Wells
Canterbury-Bankstown Bulldogs (C)	14 – 12	Mount Pritchard Mounties	Saturday, 29 June, 6:30pm	Hammondville Oval	Billy Greatbatch
Hills District Bulls	20 – 24	Ryde-Eastwood Hawks	Sunday, 30 June, 3:00pm	Crestwood Reserve	Luke Saldern
Wentworthville Magpies	20 – 22	St Marys Saints	Sunday, 30 June, 3:00pm	Ringrose Park	Mitch Currie

Round 14

Home	Score	Away	Match Information
Home	Score	Away	Date and Time	Venue	Referee	Video
Wentworthville Magpies	34 – 4	Canterbury-Bankstown Bulldogs (C)	Sunday, 7 July, 3:00pm	Ringrose Park	Luke Saldern
Ryde-Eastwood Hawks	6 – 22	St Marys Saints	Sunday, 7 July, 3:00pm	TG Milner Field	Mitch Currie
Penrith Brothers	BYE	Mount Pritchard Mounties
Glebe Dirty Reds	BYE	Hills District Bulls

Round 15

Home	Score	Away	Match Information
Home	Score	Away	Date and Time	Venue	Referee	Video
Wentworthville Magpies	12 – 18	Mount Pritchard Mounties	Saturday, 13 July, 3:00pm	Ringrose Park	Martin Jones
Ryde-Eastwood Hawks	16 – 26	Penrith Brothers	Saturday, 13 July, 3:00pm	TG Milner Field	Karra-Lee Nolan
Glebe Dirty Reds	26 – 28	St Marys Saints	Sunday, 14 July, 11:45am	Wentworth Park	Damian Brady
Hills District Bulls	30 – 38	Canterbury-Bankstown Bulldogs (C)	Sunday, 14 July, 3:00pm	Crestwood Reserve	Mitch Currie

Round 16

Home	Score	Away	Match Information
Home	Score	Away	Date and Time	Venue	Referee	Video
Mount Pritchard Mounties	28 – 22	Ryde-Eastwood Hawks	Saturday, 20 July, 1:00pm	Aubrey Keech Reserve	Martin Jones
St Marys Saints	42 – 6	Hills District Bulls	Saturday, 20 July, 3:00pm	St Marys Leagues Stadium	Karra-Lee Nolan
Canterbury-Bankstown Bulldogs (C)	16 – 16	Penrith Brothers	Saturday, 20 July, 5:00pm	Hammondville Oval	Dillan Wells
Wentworthville Magpies	32 – 28	Glebe Dirty Reds	Saturday, 20 July, 6:00pm	Ringrose Park	Mitch Currie

Round 17

Home	Score	Away	Match Information
Home	Score	Away	Date and Time	Venue	Referee	Video
Hills District Bulls	22 – 36	Glebe Dirty Reds	Saturday, 27 July, 3:00pm	Crestwood Reserve	Michael Ford
St Marys Saints	30 – 22	Mount Pritchard Mounties	Saturday, 27 July, 3:00pm	St Marys Leagues Stadium	Ethan Klein
Wentworthville Magpies	22 – 27	Penrith Brothers	Sunday, 28 July, 3:00pm	Ringrose Park	Dillan Wells
Ryde-Eastwood Hawks	38 – 24	Canterbury-Bankstown Bulldogs (C)	Sunday, 28 July, 3:00pm	TG Milner Field	Tom Stindl

Round 18

Home	Score	Away	Match Information
Home	Score	Away	Date and Time	Venue	Referee	Video
Mount Pritchard Mounties	34 – 24	Hills District Bulls	Saturday, 3 August, 3:00pm	Aubrey Keech Reserve	Dillan Wells
Canterbury-Bankstown Bulldogs (C)	52 – 8	Glebe Dirty Reds	Saturday, 3 August, 5:00pm	Hammondville Oval	Jake Sutherland
Penrith Brothers	12 – 44	St Marys Saints	Sunday, 4 August, 3:00pm	Parker Street Reserve	Tom Stindl
Ryde-Eastwood Hawks	18 – 28	Wentworthville Magpies	Sunday, 4 August, 3:00pm	TG Milner Field	Cameron Turner

Round 19

Home	Score	Away	Match Information
Home	Score	Away	Date and Time	Venue	Referee	Video
Penrith Brothers	28 – 34	Mount Pritchard Mounties	Saturday, 10 August, 3:00pm	Parker Street Reserve	Michael Ford
St Marys Saints	34 – 20	Canterbury-Bankstown Bulldogs (C)	Saturday, 10 August, 3:00pm	St Marys Leagues Stadium	Cameron Turner
Wentworthville Magpies	60 – 12	Hills District Bulls	Saturday, 10 August, 4:00pm	Ringrose Park	Tom Stindl
Glebe Dirty Reds	36 – 18	Ryde-Eastwood Hawks	Sunday, 11 August, 1:00pm	Wentworth Park	Dillan Wells

Round 20

Home	Score	Away	Match Information
Home	Score	Away	Date and Time	Venue	Referee	Video
Wentworthville Magpies	14 – 12	St Marys Saints	Saturday, 17 August, 2:00pm	Ringrose Park	Karra-Lee Nolan
Canterbury-Bankstown Bulldogs (C)	22 – 30	Mount Pritchard Mounties	Saturday, 17 August, 6:30pm	Hammondville Oval	Dillan Wells
Glebe Dirty Reds	66 – 14	Penrith Brothers	Sunday, 18 August, 11:45am	Wentworth Park	Tom Stindl
Hills District Bulls	12 – 36	Ryde-Eastwood Hawks	Sunday, 18 August, 3:00pm	Crestwood Reserve	Michael Ford

==== Finals Series ====
Qualifying Final
2	Mount Pritchard	12
3	Wentworthville	22
4	Glebe	32
5	Ryde-Eastwood	16

Major Semi-Final
1	St Marys	10
3	Wentworthville	32
Minor Semi-Final
2	Mount Pritchard	18
4	Glebe	36

Preliminary Final
1	St Marys	10
4	Glebe	24

Grand Final
3	Wentworthville	6
4	Glebe	19

Home	Score	Away	Match Information
Home	Score	Away	Date and Time	Venue	Referee	Video
Qualifying & Elimination Finals
Glebe Dirty Reds	32 – 16	Ryde-Eastwood Hawks	Saturday, 24 August, 1:00pm	St Marys Leagues Stadium	Clayton Wills
Mount Pritchard Mounties	12 – 22	Wentworthville Magpies	Saturday, 24 August, 5:00pm	St Marys Leagues Stadium	Martin Jones
Major & Minor Semi-Finals
Mount Pritchard Mounties	18 – 36	Glebe Dirty Reds	Saturday, 31 August, 12:45pm	Ringrose Park	Martin Jones
St Marys Saints	10 – 32	Wentworthville Magpies	Saturday, 31 August, 4:15pm	Ringrose Park	Clayton Wills
Preliminary Final
St Marys Saints	10 – 24	Glebe Dirty Reds	Saturday, 7 September, 3:00pm	St Marys Leagues Stadium	Clayton Wills
Grand Final
Wentworthville Magpies	6 – 19	Glebe Dirty Reds	Saturday, 14 September, 5:00pm	Leichhardt Oval	Clayton Wills

==== Grand Final ====
2024 Ron Massey Cup Grand Final

Saturday, 14 September
5:00pm (AEST)

Wentworthville Magpies	6 – 19	Glebe Dirty Reds
Tries: Kyle Cassel (58') 1 Goals: Liam O'Brien 1/1 (59')	1st: 0 – 8; 2nd: 6 – 11	Tries: 2 (49', 78') David Nofoaluma; 1 (11') Vito Tevaga; Goals: 2/2 Daniel Arahu (35'p, 51'); 1/1 Joseph Whitikama Temara Taipari (13'); 0/1 Corey Ross; Field goals: 1 (80') Dean Whare

Leichhardt Oval, Sydney
Referee: Clayton Wills
Player of the Match: Jade Anderson

Team lists:

FB	1	Austin Quast
WG	5	Joshuah Minhinnick
CE	3	Liam O'Brien
CE	4	Chris Tupou
WG	18	Ethyn Martin
FE	6	Dylan White
HB	7	Kruz Niutili-Schmidt
PR	8	Adam Spicer
HK	9	Meni Luke
PR	10	Reece Alderton
SR	11	Kyle Cassel
SR	12	Felix Niutili-Schmidt
LK	13	Blake Cook (c)
Substitutes:
IC	16	James Gammidge
IC	19	Robbie Graham
IC	21	Denzal Tonise
IC	23	Beni Valu
Replacement:
RE	2	Jordan Hill
Coach:
Brett Cook

Officials:

Clayton Wills (Referee)

Mitchell Stone (Touch Judge)

Liam Nicholls (Touch Judge)

Louis Matheson (In-Goal Judge)

Charlie Suters (In-Goal Judge)

FB	1	Jade Anderson
WG	2	David Nofoaluma
CE	3	Iverson Fuatimau
CE	4	Vito Tevaga
WG	5	Adam Batty
FE	6	Joseph Whitikama Temara Taipari
HB	24	Dean Whare
PR	8	Tayson Fakaosi
HK	9	Craig Garvey (c)
PR	10	Callum Ellis
SR	11	Corey Ross
SR	12	Lachlan Poko
LK	14	Michael Coleman
Substitutes:
IC	15	Daniel Arahu
IC	16	Casey Morgan
IC	18	Mason McCarthy
IC	21	Meli Nasau
Replacement:
RE	25	Saiyasi Ikanidrodro
Coach:
Aaron Zammit

=== Denton Engineering Cup ===
The Denton Engineering Cup is the Newcastle men's first grade competition and is regarded as being on the same tier as the Ron Massey Cup.

==== Teams ====
Colours	Club	Home ground(s)	Head coach
	Central Newcastle Butcher Boys	St John Oval	Adam Bettridge
	Cessnock Goannas	Cessnock Sportsground	Harry Siejka
	Kurri Kurri Bulldogs	Kurri Kurri Sports Ground	Rip Taylor
	Lakes United Seagulls	Cahill Oval	Ian Bourke
	Macquarie Scorpions	Lyall Peacock Field	Jye Bailey
	Maitland Pickers	Maitland Sportsground	Matt Lantry
	Northern Hawks	Tomaree Sports Ground	Brad Tighe
	South Newcastle Lions	Townson Oval	TBA
	The Entrance Tigers	EDSACC Oval	Jamie Forbes
	Western Suburbs Rosellas	Harker Oval	Rick Stone
	Wyong Roos	Morry Breen Oval	Mitch Williams

==== Ladder ====
Pos	Team	Pld	W	D	L	B	PF	PA	PD	Pts
1	Maitland Pickers	16	14	1	1	2	500	190	+310	33
2	South Newcastle Lions	16	12	0	4	2	530	294	+238	28
3	Central Newcastle Butcher Boys	16	11	0	5	2	447	256	+191	26
4	The Entrance Tigers	16	10	2	4	2	484	304	+180	26
5	Cessnock Goannas	16	9	3	4	2	402	286	+116	25
6	Wyong Roos	16	9	0	7	2	371	332	+39	22
7	Western Suburbs Rosellas	16	7	1	8	2	388	344	+44	19
8	Lakes United Seagulls	16	5	1	10	2	406	383	+23	15
9	Northern Hawks	16	4	1	11	2	264	462	-198	13
10	Macquarie Scorpions	16	2	0	14	2	190	652	-462	8
11	Kurri Kurri Bulldogs	16	0	1	15	2	224	703	-479	5

Updated to match(es) played on 31 August. Source:
Rules for classification: 1) points; 2) point difference; 3) points scored

===== Ladder progression =====
- Numbers highlighted in green indicate that the team finished the round inside the top 5.
- Numbers highlighted in blue indicates the team finished first on the ladder in that round.
- Numbers highlighted in red indicates the team finished last place on the ladder in that round.
- Underlined numbers indicate that the team had a bye during that round.

Pos	Team	1	2	3	5	4	6	8	10	13	14	15	11	16	7	9	17	18	12
1	Maitland Pickers	2	4	4	7	7	9	13	19	21	23	25	25	27	27	27	29	31	33
2	South Newcastle Lions	2	4	6	8	10	12	12	18	20	22	24	24	24	24	24	26	28	28
3	Central Newcastle Butcher Boys	2	2	4	6	6	8	10	16	16	18	18	20	20	22	22	24	24	26
4	The Entrance Tigers	2	4	6	8	8	8	10	16	17	19	21	22	22	22	22	22	24	26
5	Cessnock Goannas	2	4	6	9	9	10	14	16	17	19	19	19	19	19	19	21	23	25
6	Wyong Roos	2	2	2	4	4	4	8	10	12	12	14	18	18	18	18	20	22	22
7	Western Suburbs Rosellas	0	1	3	7	7	9	11	11	13	13	15	15	15	15	15	15	17	19
8	Lakes United Seagulls	0	1	3	5	5	7	7	11	11	13	13	15	15	15	15	15	15	15
9	Northern Hawks	0	0	0	0	0	0	2	2	4	6	8	9	9	9	11	13	13	13
10	Macquarie Scorpions	0	2	2	4	4	4	6	6	6	6	6	8	8	8	8	8	8	8
11	Kurri Kurri Bulldogs	0	0	0	0	0	1	3	3	3	3	3	3	3	3	3	3	3	5

Season Results:

Round 1

Home	Score	Away	Match Information
Home	Score	Away	Date and Time	Venue	Referee	Video
The Entrance Tigers	28 – 24	Lakes United Seagulls	Saturday, 13 April, 12:00pm	Newcastle No.2 Sportsground	Joey Butler
Wyong Roos	25 – 24	Kurri Kurri Bulldogs	Saturday, 13 April, 1:45pm	Newcastle No.2 Sportsground	Brett Eyb
Northern Hawks	10 – 20	Maitland Pickers	Saturday, 13 April, 3:30pm	Newcastle No.2 Sportsground	Louis Matheson
Macquarie Scorpions	6 – 26	Cessnock Goannas	Saturday, 13 April, 5:15pm	Newcastle No.2 Sportsground	Tom Taylor
Western Suburbs Rosellas	8 – 22	Central Newcastle Butcher Boys	Saturday, 13 April, 7:00pm	Newcastle No.2 Sportsground	Kurt Grogan
South Newcastle Lions		BYE

Round 2

Home	Score	Away	Match Information
Home	Score	Away	Date and Time	Venue	Referee	Video
Maitland Pickers	20 – 0	Kurri Kurri Bulldogs	Saturday, 20 April, 3:00pm	Maitland Sportsground	Joey Butler
Wyong Roos	0 – 6	The Entrance Tigers	Saturday, 20 April, 3:00pm	Morry Breen Oval	Tom Taylor
Lakes United Seagulls	12 – 12	Western Suburbs Rosellas	Saturday, 20 April, 3:00pm	Cahill Oval	Brett Eyb
Macquarie Scorpions	34 – 20	Northern Hawks	Sunday, 28 April, 3:00pm	Lyall Peacock Field	Nathan Hillier
South Newcastle Lions	24 – 6	Central Newcastle Butcher Boys	Sunday, 28 April, 3:00pm	Townson Oval	Joey Butler
Cessnock Goannas		BYE

Round 3

Home	Score	Away	Match Information
Home	Score	Away	Date and Time	Venue	Referee	Video
South Newcastle Lions	56 – 14	Kurri Kurri Bulldogs	Thursday, 25 April, 2:00pm	Townson Oval	Tom Taylor
Central Newcastle Butcher Boys	38 – 10	Macquarie Scorpions	Thursday, 25 April, 2:00pm	St John Oval	Kurt Grogan
Cessnock Goannas	44 – 6	Northern Hawks	Thursday, 25 April, 5:00pm	Cessnock Sportsground	Joey Butler
Western Suburbs Rosellas	36 – 30	Maitland Pickers	Sunday, 28 April, 3:00pm	Harker Oval	Luke Saldern
Lakes United Seagulls	20 – 14	Wyong Roos	Sunday, 28 April, 3:00pm	Cahill Oval	Kurt Grogan
The Entrance Tigers		BYE

Round 4

Home	Score	Away	Match Information
Home	Score	Away	Date and Time	Venue	Referee	Video
Cessnock Goannas	12 – 12	Maitland Pickers	Saturday, 4 May, 3:00pm	Cessnock Sportsground	Nathan Hillier
Northern Hawks	12 – 22	Wyong Roos	Saturday, 4 May, 3:00pm	Tomaree Sports Ground	Tom Taylor
Kurri Kurri Bulldogs	18 – 30	Lakes United Seagulls	Saturday, 4 May, 3:00pm	Kurri Kurri Sports Ground	Kurt Grogan
Western Suburbs Rosellas	20 – 12	The Entrance Tigers	Sunday, 5 May, 3:00pm	Harker Oval	Joey Butler
Macquarie Scorpions	8 – 24	South Newcastle Lions	Saturday, 18 May, 3:00pm	Lyall Peacock Field	Brett Eyb
Central Newcastle Butcher Boys		BYE

Round 5

Home	Score	Away	Match Information
Home	Score	Away	Date and Time	Venue	Referee	Video
Maitland Pickers	34 – 12	Lakes United Seagulls	Saturday, 11 May, 3:00pm	Maitland Sportsground	Tom Taylor
Wyong Roos	16 – 18	South Newcastle Lions	Saturday, 11 May, 3:00pm	Morry Breen Oval	Adam Sirianni
Western Suburbs Rosellas	34 – 4	Northern Hawks	Saturday, 11 May, 3:00pm	Lakeside Sporting Complex	Nathan Hillier
Central Newcastle Butcher Boys	16 – 26	Cessnock Goannas	Sunday, 12 May, 2:00pm	Cessnock Sportsground	Joey Butler
The Entrance Tigers	62 – 10	Kurri Kurri Bulldogs	Sunday, 12 May, 3:00pm	Maitland Sportsground	Kurt Grogan
Macquarie Scorpions		BYE

Round 6

Home	Score	Away	Match Information
Home	Score	Away	Date and Time	Venue	Referee	Video
Kurri Kurri Bulldogs	28 – 28	Cessnock Goannas	Saturday, 25 May, 3:00pm	Kurri Kurri Sports Ground	Brett Eyb
Maitland Pickers	30 – 14	Wyong Roos	Saturday, 25 May, 3:00pm	Maitland Sportsground	Kurt Grogan
Northern Hawks	6 – 16	Central Newcastle Butcher Boys	Saturday, 25 May, 5:00pm	Tomaree Sports Ground	Nathan Hillier
The Entrance Tigers	22 – 26	South Newcastle Lions	Sunday, 26 May, 3:00pm	EDSACC Oval	Joey Butler
Macquarie Scorpions	22 – 42	Western Suburbs Rosellas	Sunday, 26 May, 3:00pm	Lyall Peacock Field	Tom Taylor
Lakes United Seagulls		BYE

Round 7

Home	Score	Away	Match Information
Home	Score	Away	Date and Time	Venue	Referee	Video
Kurri Kurri Bulldogs	10 – 24	Macquarie Scorpions	Saturday, 1 June, 3:00pm	Kurri Kurri Sports Ground	Joey Butler
Cessnock Goannas	30 – 12	South Newcastle Lions	Sunday, 2 June, 3:00pm	Cessnock Sportsground	Tom Taylor
The Entrance Tigers	8 – 18	Maitland Pickers	Tuesday, 4 June, 7:45pm	EDSACC Oval	Kurt Grogan
Western Suburbs Rosellas	16 – 22	Wyong Roos	Thursday, 6 June, 7:45pm	Morry Breen Oval	Tom Taylor
Lakes United Seagulls	24 – 26	Central Newcastle Butcher Boys	Saturday, 10 August, 3:35pm	Cahill Oval	Kurt Grogan
Northern Hawks		BYE

Round 8

Home	Score	Away	Match Information
Home	Score	Away	Date and Time	Venue	Referee
Maitland Pickers	50 – 14	Northern Hawks	Saturday, 8 June, 3:00pm	Maitland Sportsground	Joey Butler
Lakes United Seagulls	20 – 30	The Entrance Tigers	Saturday, 8 June, 3:00pm	Cahill Oval	Brett Eyb
Cessnock Goannas	20 – 18	Macquarie Scorpions	Saturday, 8 June, 5:50pm	Lakeside Sporting Complex	Kurt Grogan
Central Newcastle Butcher Boys	24 – 22	South Newcastle Lions	Wednesday, 12 June, 7:45pm	St John Oval	Nathan Hillier
Kurri Kurri Bulldogs	BYE	Western Suburbs Rosellas
Wyong Roos	BYE

Round 9

Home	Score	Away	Match Information
Home	Score	Away	Date and Time	Venue	Referee	Video
Cessnock Goannas	26 – 12	Lakes United Seagulls	Saturday, 15 June, 3:00pm	Howe Park	Joey Butler
Kurri Kurri Bulldogs	22 – 54	The Entrance Tigers	Saturday, 15 June, 3:00pm	Kurri Kurri Sports Ground	Nathan Hillier
South Newcastle Lions	38 – 8	Wyong Roos	Sunday, 16 June, 2:00pm	Townson Oval	Tom Taylor
Macquarie Scorpions	0 – 50	Central Newcastle Butcher Boys	Tuesday, 18 June, 7:45pm	St John Oval	Brett Eyb
Northern Hawks	14 – 12	Western Suburbs Rosellas	Saturday, 10 August, 5:00pm	Tomaree Sports Ground	Nathan Hillier
Maitland Pickers		BYE

Round 10

Home	Score	Away	Match Information
Home	Score	Away	Date and Time	Venue	Referee	Video
South Newcastle Lions	62 – 10	Macquarie Scorpions	Saturday, 22 June, 2:00pm	Townson Oval	Nathan Hillier
Maitland Pickers	44 – 6	Cessnock Goannas	Saturday, 22 June, 3:00pm	Maitland Sportsground	Joey Butler
Lakes United Seagulls	62 – 10	Kurri Kurri Bulldogs	Saturday, 22 June, 3:00pm	Cahill Oval	Tom Taylor
The Entrance Tigers	30 – 16	Western Suburbs Rosellas	Sunday, 23 June, 3:00pm	EDSACC Oval	Kurt Grogan
Northern Hawks	14 – 36	Wyong Roos	Wednesday, 3 July, 8:00pm	Mallabula Sporting Complex	Jackson-James Walsh
Central Newcastle Butcher Boys		BYE

Round 11

Home	Score	Away	Match Information
Home	Score	Away	Date and Time	Venue	Referee	Video
Maitland Pickers	20 – 8	Western Suburbs Rosellas	Saturday, 29 June, 3:00pm	Maitland Sportsground	Tom Taylor
Northern Hawks	24 – 46	South Newcastle Lions	Saturday, 29 June, 5:00pm	Tomaree Sports Ground	Joey Butler
Macquarie Scorpions	16 – 28	The Entrance Tigers	Sunday, 30 June, 2:15pm	Lyall Peacock Field	Nathan Hillier
Central Newcastle Butcher Boys	34 – 4	Kurri Kurri Bulldogs	Sunday, 30 June, 3:00pm	St John Oval	Kurt Grogan
Cessnock Goannas	4 – 12	Wyong Roos	Friday, 9 August, 7:45pm	Cessnock Sportsground	Tom Taylor
Lakes United Seagulls		BYE

Round 12

Home	Score	Away	Match Information
Home	Score	Away	Date and Time	Venue	Referee	Video
The Entrance Tigers	44 – 26	Wyong Roos	Saturday, 31 August, 2:00pm	EDSACC Oval	Tom Taylor
South Newcastle Lions	24 – 32	Cessnock Goannas	Saturday, 31 August, 2:00pm	Townson Oval	Kurt Grogan
Macquarie Scorpions	0 – 32*	Maitland Pickers	Saturday, 31 August, 3:00pm	Lyall Peacock Field	N/A
Western Suburbs Rosellas	28 – 24	Lakes United Seagulls	Saturday, 31 August, 3:00pm	Harker Oval	Brodie Barrie
Central Newcastle Butcher Boys	44 – 6	Northern Hawks	Saturday, 31 August, 7:30pm	St John Oval	Joey Butler
Kurri Kurri Bulldogs		BYE

Round 13

Home	Score	Away	Match Information
Home	Score	Away	Date and Time	Venue	Referee	Video
South Newcastle Lions	38 – 18	Lakes United Seagulls	Saturday, 13 July, 1:30pm	Townson Oval	Kurt Grogan
Kurri Kurri Bulldogs	20 – 36	Northern Hawks	Saturday, 13 July, 3:00pm	Kurri Kurri Sports Ground	Cameron Smith
Maitland Pickers	26 – 24	Central Newcastle Butcher Boys	Saturday, 13 July, 3:00pm	Maitland Sportsground	Joey Butler
Wyong Roos	38 – 10	Macquarie Scorpions	Saturday, 13 July, 3:00pm	Morry Breen Oval	Jackson-James Walsh
The Entrance Tigers	20 – 20	Cessnock Goannas	Sunday, 14 July, 3:00pm	EDSACC Oval	Brett Eyb
Western Suburbs Rosellas		BYE

Round 14

Home	Score	Away	Match Information
Home	Score	Away	Date and Time	Venue	Referee	Video
Cessnock Goannas	68 – 10	Kurri Kurri Bulldogs	Saturday, 20 July, 3:00pm	Cessnock Sportsground	Nathan Hillier
Wyong Roos	10 – 16	Maitland Pickers	Saturday, 20 July, 3:00pm	Morry Breen Oval	Cameron Smith
Lakes United Seagulls	82 – 6	Macquarie Scorpions	Sunday, 21 July, 3:00pm	Cahill Oval	Joey Butler
Central Newcastle Butcher Boys	38 – 14	Western Suburbs Rosellas	Sunday, 21 July, 3:00pm	St John Oval	Kurt Grogan
Northern Hawks	BYE	South Newcastle Lions
The Entrance Tigers	BYE

Round 15

Home	Score	Away	Match Information
Home	Score	Away	Date and Time	Venue	Referee	Video
Maitland Pickers	50 – 0	Macquarie Scorpions	Saturday, 27 July, 3:00pm	Maitland Sportsground	Jack Fisher
Northern Hawks	28 – 18	Lakes United Seagulls	Saturday, 27 July, 5:00pm	Tomaree Sports Ground	Tom Taylor
Kurri Kurri Bulldogs	8 – 56	South Newcastle Lions	Sunday, 28 July, 3:00pm	Kurri Kurri Sports Ground	Kurt Grogan
Central Newcastle Butcher Boys	26 – 36	The Entrance Tigers	Sunday, 28 July, 3:00pm	St John Oval	Nathan Hillier
Western Suburbs Rosellas	20 – 12	Cessnock Goannas	Sunday, 28 July, 3:00pm	Harker Oval	Joey Butler
Wyong Roos		BYE

Round 16

Home	Score	Away	Match Information
Home	Score	Away	Date and Time	Venue	Referee	Video
Wyong Roos	36 – 32	Western Suburbs Rosellas	Saturday, 3 August, 3:00pm	Morry Breen Oval	Nathan Hillier
Lakes United Seagulls	32 – 8	Cessnock Goannas	Saturday, 3 August, 3:00pm	Cahill Oval	Kurt Grogan
Kurri Kurri Bulldogs	16 – 40	Central Newcastle Butcher Boys	Saturday, 3 August, 3:15pm	Kurri Kurri Sports Ground	Tom Taylor
Northern Hawks	20 – 20	The Entrance Tigers	Saturday, 3 August, 5:00pm	Tomaree Sports Ground	Jack Fisher
South Newcastle Lions	20 – 42	Maitland Pickers	Saturday, 10 August, 3:00pm	Townson Oval	Joey Butler
Macquarie Scorpions		BYE

Round 17

Home	Score	Away	Match Information
Home	Score	Away	Date and Time	Venue	Referee	Video
Cessnock Goannas	40 – 14	The Entrance Tigers	Saturday, 17 August, 3:00pm	Cessnock Sportsground	Kurt Grogan
Macquarie Scorpions	26 – 58	Wyong Roos	Saturday, 17 August, 3:00pm	Lyall Peacock Field	Brett Eyb
Western Suburbs Rosellas	26 – 30	South Newcastle Lions	Saturday, 17 August, 3:00pm	Harker Oval	Tom Taylor
Northern Hawks	44 – 12	Kurri Kurri Bulldogs	Saturday, 17 August, 5:00pm	Tomaree Sports Ground	Jack Fisher
Central Newcastle Butcher Boys	21* – 0	Lakes United Seagulls	Saturday, 17 August, 7:30pm	St John Oval	Joey Butler
Maitland Pickers		BYE

Round 18

Home	Score	Away	Match Information
Home	Score	Away	Date and Time	Venue	Referee	Video
South Newcastle Lions	34 – 6	Northern Hawks	Saturday, 24 August, 2:00pm	Townson Oval	Joey Butler
Kurri Kurri Bulldogs	16 – 64	Western Suburbs Rosellas	Saturday, 24 August, 3:00pm	Kurri Kurri Sports Ground	Jack Fisher
Wyong Roos	34 – 22	Central Newcastle Butcher Boys	Saturday, 24 August, 3:00pm	Morry Breen Oval	Kurt Grogan
Lakes United Seagulls	16 – 56	Maitland Pickers	Saturday, 24 August, 3:00pm	Cahill Oval	Tom Taylor
The Entrance Tigers	70 – 0	Macquarie Scorpions	Saturday, 24 August, 3:00pm	EDSACC Oval	Brett Eyb
Cessnock Goannas		BYE

==== Finals Series ====
Qualifying Final
2	South Newcastle	10
3	Central Newcastle	26
4	The Entrance	16
5	Cessnock	6

Major Semi-Final
1	Maitland	40
3	Central Newcastle	12
Minor Semi-Final
2	South Newcastle	10
4	The Entrance	28

Preliminary Final
3	Central Newcastle
4	The Entrance

Grand Final
1	Maitland
3/4

Home	Score	Away	Match Information
Home	Score	Away	Date and Time	Venue	Referee	Video
Qualifying & Elimination Finals
South Newcastle Lions	10 – 26	Central Newcastle Butcher Boys	Saturday, 7 September, 3:00pm	Townson Oval	Tom Taylor
The Entrance Tigers	16 – 6	Cessnock Goannas	Sunday, 8 September, 3:00pm	EDSACC Oval	Joey Butler
Major & Minor Semi-Finals
Maitland Pickers	40 – 12	Central Newcastle Butcher Boys	Saturday, 14 September, 3:00pm	Maitland Sportsground	Kurt Grogan
South Newcastle Lions	10 – 28	The Entrance Tigers	Sunday, 15 September, 3:00pm	Cessnock Sportsground	Joey Butler
Preliminary Final
Central Newcastle Butcher Boys	30 – 20	The Entrance Tigers	Sunday, 22 September, 3:00pm	St John Oval	Joey Butler
Grand Final
Maitland Pickers	24 – 4	Central Newcastle Butcher Boys	Sunday, 29 September, 3:00pm	McDonald Jones Stadium	Joey Butler

== Tier 3 ==
=== Sydney Shield ===
The Sydney Shield is the State's third tier men's competition. It feeds into the Ron Massey Cup.

==== Teams ====
Colours	Club	Home ground(s)	Head coach
	Cabramatta Two Blues	New Era Stadium	TBA
	Glebe Dirty Reds	Wentworth Park	TBA
	Hills District Bulls	Crestwood Reserve	TBA
	Manly Warringah Sea Eagles	Lionel Watts Park, 4 Pines Park	TBA
	Moorebank Rams	Hammondville Oval	TBA
	Mount Pritchard Mounties	Aubrey Keech Reserve	TBA
	Penrith Brothers	Parker Street Reserve	TBA
	Ryde-Eastwood Hawks	TG Milner Field	TBA
	St Marys Saints	St Marys Leagues Stadium	TBA
	Wentworthville Magpies	Ringrose Park	TBA

==== Ladder ====
Pos	Team	Pld	W	D	L	B	PF	PA	PD	Pts
1	Wentworthville Magpies (B)	18	14	1	3	2	556	321	+235	33
2	Ryde-Eastwood Hawks (B)	18	10	3	5	2	530	369	+161	27
3	Mount Pritchard Mounties (B)	18	11	0	7	2	500	427	+73	26
4	St Marys Saints (B)	18	10	1	7	2	579	469	+110	25
5	Penrith Brothers (B)	18	9	1	8	2	467	386	+81	23
6	Glebe Dirty Reds (B)	18	8	1	9	2	507	480	+27	21
7	Manly Warringah Sea Eagles (B)	18	8	0	10	2	436	492	–56	20
8	Cabramatta Two Blues	18	6	2	10	2	385	492	-107	18
9	Hills District Bulls (B)	18	6	1	11	2	438	622	-184	17
10	Moorebank Rams	18	3	0	15	2	354	694	-340	10

Updated to match(es) played on 18 August. Source:
Rules for classification: 1) points; 2) point difference; 3) points scored

===== Ladder progression =====
- Numbers highlighted in green indicate that the team finished the round inside the top 5.
- Numbers highlighted in blue indicates the team finished first on the ladder in that round.
- Numbers highlighted in red indicates the team finished last place on the ladder in that round.

Pos	Team	1	2	4	5	6	7	8	9	3	10	11	13	12	14	15	16	17	18	19	20
1	Wentworthville Magpies (B)	1	3	7	7	9	9	11	13	15	15	17	21	21	23	25	27	27	29	31	33
2	Ryde-Eastwood Hawks (B)	2	4	6	8	8	10	12	14	15	15	15	17	17	19	19	21	23	24	26	27
3	Mount Pritchard Mounties (B)	0	2	4	6	8	10	10	14	16	16	16	18	18	20	20	20	22	24	26	26
4	St Marys Saints (B)	2	4	6	8	10	10	10	10	12	12	14	16	16	16	18	19	19	21	23	25
5	Penrith Brothers (B)	1	3	3	5	7	7	9	11	11	11	11	13	13	15	17	17	19	19	21	23
6	Glebe Dirty Reds (B)	2	2	2	4	6	6	6	6	8	8	10	12	14	16	16	18	20	21	21	21
7	Manly Warringah Sea Eagles (B)	2	2	4	4	4	6	8	8	8	8	10	12	12	12	12	14	16	18	18	20
8	Cabramatta Two Blues	0	0	2	2	4	6	6	10	11	11	11	13	13	15	17	17	17	17	17	18
9	Hills District Bulls (B)	0	0	2	2	4	4	6	6	6	8	10	14	14	16	16	17	17	17	17	17
10	Moorebank Rams	0	0	4	4	4	6	6	6	6	6	6	8	8	8	10	10	10	10	10	10

Season Results:

Round 1

Home	Score	Away	Match Information
Home	Score	Away	Date and Time	Venue	Referee
Cabramatta Two Blues	22 – 26	Manly Warringah Sea Eagles (B)	Saturday, 16 March, 1:00pm	New Era Stadium	Ethan Klein
Mount Pritchard Mounties (B)	22 – 46	St Marys Saints (B)	Saturday, 16 March, 3:00pm	Aubrey Keech Reserve	Brendan Mani
Penrith Brothers (B)	24 – 24	Wentworthville Magpies (B)	Saturday, 16 March, 4:00pm	Parker Street Reserve	Michael Ford
Moorebank Rams	22 – 36	Ryde-Eastwood Hawks (B)	Saturday, 16 March, 4:30pm	Hammondville Oval	Nathan Loveday
Hills District Bulls (B)	22 – 26	Glebe Dirty Reds (B)	Sunday, 17 March, 1:00pm	Crestwood Reserve	Tom Stindl

Round 2

Home	Score	Away	Match Information
Home	Score	Away	Date and Time	Venue	Referee
Penrith Brothers (B)	26 – 10	Manly Warringah Sea Eagles (B)	Saturday, 23 March, 4:00pm	Parker Street Reserve	Brendan Mani
Cabramatta Two Blues	4 – 62	Mount Pritchard Mounties (B)	Saturday, 23 March, 5:00pm	New Era Stadium	Tom Stindl
Glebe Dirty Reds (B)	13 – 34	Ryde-Eastwood Hawks (B)	Sunday, 24 March, 11:00am	Wentworth Park	Nathan Loveday
Hills District Bulls (B)	18 – 54	Wentworthville Magpies (B)	Sunday, 24 March, 1:00pm	Crestwood Reserve	Dillan Wells
St Marys Saints (B)	60 – 10	Moorebank Rams	Sunday, 24 March, 1:00pm	St Marys Leagues Stadium	William Greatbatch

Round 3

Home	Score	Away	Match Information
Home	Score	Away	Date and Time	Venue	Referee
Glebe Dirty Reds (B)	18 – 24	Moorebank Rams	Sunday, 7 April, 12:00pm	Wentworth Park	Tom Stindl
Ryde-Eastwood Hawks (B)	32 – 42	Wentworthville Magpies (B)	Sunday, 7 April, 1:00pm	TG Milner Field	Dillan Wells
Cabramatta Two Blues	48 – 18	Hills District Bulls (B)	Friday, 17 May, 7:00pm	New Era Stadium	William Greatbatch
Mount Pritchard Mounties (B)	20 – 18	Manly Warringah Sea Eagles (B)	Saturday, 18 May, 1:00pm	Aubrey Keech Reserve	Ethan Klein
Penrith Brothers (B)	24 – 28	St Marys Saints (B)	Saturday, 8 June, 1:00pm	Parker Street Reserve	TBA

Round 4

Home	Score	Away	Match Information
Home	Score	Away	Date and Time	Venue	Referee
Mount Pritchard Mounties (B)	26 – 18	Glebe Dirty Reds (B)	Saturday, 13 April, 1:00pm	Aubrey Keech Reserve	Brendan Mani
Penrith Brothers (B)	20 – 22	Hills District Bulls (B)	Saturday, 13 April, 4:00pm	Parker Street Reserve	Nathan Loveday
Cabramatta Two Blues	BYE	Wentworthville Magpies (B)
St Marys Saints (B)	BYE	Ryde-Eastwood Hawks (B)
Manly Warringah Sea Eagles (B)	BYE	Moorebank Rams

Round 5

Home	Score	Away	Match Information
Home	Score	Away	Date and Time	Venue	Referee
Cabramatta Two Blues	22 – 28	Penrith Brothers (B)	Saturday, 20 April, 10:00am	St Marys Leagues Stadium	Blake Williams
Mount Pritchard Mounties (B)	66 – 0	Moorebank Rams	Saturday, 20 April, 12:00pm	St Marys Leagues Stadium	Luke Saldern
Manly Warringah Sea Eagles (B)	24 – 32	Glebe Dirty Reds (B)	Saturday, 20 April, 2:00pm	St Marys Leagues Stadium	Louis Matheson
St Marys Saints (B)	41 – 12	Wentworthville Magpies (B)	Saturday, 20 April, 4:00pm	St Marys Leagues Stadium	Nathan Loveday
Ryde-Eastwood Hawks (B)	50 – 20	Hills District Bulls (B)	Saturday, 20 April, 6:00pm	St Marys Leagues Stadium	Brendan Mani

Round 6

Home	Score	Away	Match Information
Home	Score	Away	Date and Time	Venue	Referee
St Marys Saints (B)	28 – 26	Ryde-Eastwood Hawks (B)	Saturday, 27 April, 2:00pm	St Marys Leagues Stadium	Michael Ford
Manly Warringah Sea Eagles (B)	12 – 20	Wentworthville Magpies (B)	Saturday, 27 April, 2:00pm	4 Pines Park	Ethan Klein
Moorebank Rams	14 – 44	Cabramatta Two Blues	Saturday, 27 April, 4:30pm	Hammondville Oval	Blake Williams
Penrith Brothers (B)	BYE	Mount Pritchard Mounties (B)
Glebe Dirty Reds (B)	BYE	Hills District Bulls (B)

Round 7

Home	Score	Away	Match Information
Home	Score	Away	Date and Time	Venue	Referee
Manly Warringah Sea Eagles (B)	28 – 18	St Marys Saints (B)	Saturday, 4 May, 10:30am	4 Pines Park	Louis Matheson
Moorebank Rams	36 – 22	Hills District Bulls (B)	Saturday, 4 May, 4:30pm	Hammondville Oval	Nathan Loveday
Glebe Dirty Reds (B)	36 – 12	Cabramatta Two Blues	Saturday, 4 May, 5:00pm	New Era Stadium	Ethan Klein
Wentworthville Magpies (B)	16 – 22	Mount Pritchard Mounties (B)	Sunday, 5 May, 12:00pm	Ringrose Park	Dillan Wells
Ryde-Eastwood Hawks (B)	30 – 10	Penrith Brothers (B)	Sunday, 5 May, 1:00pm	TG Milner Field	Michael Ford

Round 8

Home	Score	Away	Match Information
Home	Score	Away	Date and Time	Venue	Referee
Penrith Brothers (B)	28 – 18	Glebe Dirty Reds (B)	Saturday, 11 May, 2:00pm	Parker Street Reserve	Tom Stindl
St Marys Saints (B)	28 – 42	Hills District Bulls (B)	Saturday, 11 May, 2:00pm	St Marys Leagues Stadium	Billy Greatbatch
Wentworthville Magpies (B)	22 – 0	Cabramatta Two Blues	Sunday, 12 May, 12:00pm	Ringrose Park	Nathan Loveday
Manly Warringah Sea Eagles (B)	32 – 28	Moorebank Rams	Sunday, 12 May, 1:00pm	HE Laybutt Field	Ethan Klein
Ryde-Eastwood Hawks (B)	30 – 6	Mount Pritchard Mounties (B)	Sunday, 12 May, 1:00pm	TG Milner Field	Dillan Wells

Round 9

Home	Score	Away	Match Information
Home	Score	Away	Date and Time	Venue	Referee
Cabramatta Two Blues	34 – 32	St Marys Saints (B)	Saturday, 25 May, 4:00pm	New Era Stadium	Blake Williams
Moorebank Rams	30 – 31	Penrith Brothers (B)	Saturday, 25 May, 4:30pm	Hammondville Oval	Brendan Mani
Wentworthville Magpies (B)	26 – 24	Glebe Dirty Reds (B)	Saturday, 25 May, 6:00pm	Ringrose Park	Ethan Klein
Hills District Bulls (B)	10 – 34	Mount Pritchard Mounties (B)	Sunday, 26 May, 1:00pm	Crestwood Reserve	Louis Matheson
Ryde-Eastwood Hawks (B)	70 – 12	Manly Warringah Sea Eagles (B)	Sunday, 26 May, 1:00pm	TG Milner Field	Nathan Loveday

Round 10

Home	Score	Away	Match Information
Home	Score	Away	Date and Time	Venue	Referee
Penrith Brothers (B)	0 – 24	Mount Pritchard Mounties (B)	Saturday, 1 June, 1:00pm	Parker Street Reserve	Louis Matheson
Cabramatta Two Blues	16 – 16	Ryde-Eastwood Hawks (B)	Saturday, 1 June, 4:00pm	New Era Stadium	Billy Greatbatch
Glebe Dirty Reds (B)	52 – 10	St Marys Saints (B)	Saturday, 1 June, 3:00pm	St Marys Leagues Stadium	Ethan Klein
Wentworthville Magpies (B)	30 – 14	Moorebank Rams	Saturday, 1 June, 6:00pm	Ringrose Park	Nathan Loveday
Hills District Bulls (B)	36 – 32	Manly Warringah Sea Eagles (B)	Saturday, 8 June, 1:00pm	Kellyville Park	TBA

Round 11

Home	Score	Away	Match Information
Home	Score	Away	Date and Time	Venue	Referee
St Marys Saints (B)	30 – 28	Penrith Brothers (B)	Saturday, 15 June, 1:00pm	St Marys Leagues Stadium	Nathan Loveday
Moorebank Rams	18 – 40	Glebe Dirty Reds (B)	Saturday, 15 June, 4:30pm	Hammondville Oval	Tom Stindl
Cabramatta Two Blues	22 – 26	Hills District Bulls (B)	Saturday, 15 June, 5:00pm	New Era Stadium	Louis Matheson
Ryde-Eastwood Hawks (B)	22 – 50	Wentworthville Magpies (B)	Sunday, 16 June, 1:00pm	TG Milner Field	Luke Saldern
Mount Pritchard Mounties (B)	26 – 34	Manly Warringah Sea Eagles (B)	Sunday, 16 June, 1:00pm	HE Laybutt Field	Ethan Klein

Round 12

Home	Score	Away	Match Information
Home	Score	Away	Date and Time	Venue	Referee
Hills District Bulls (B)	18 – 14	Penrith Brothers (B)	Saturday, 22 June, 1:00pm	Crestwood Reserve	Paul Eden
Glebe Dirty Reds (B)	76 – 20	Mount Pritchard Mounties (B)	Sunday, 7 July, 1:55pm	Wentworth Park	Tom Stindl
Cabramatta Two Blues	BYE	Wentworthville Magpies (B)
St Marys Saints (B)	BYE	Ryde-Eastwood Hawks (B)
Manly Warringah Sea Eagles (B)	BYE	Moorebank Rams

Round 13

Home	Score	Away	Match Information
Home	Score	Away	Date and Time	Venue	Referee
Manly Warringah Sea Eagles (B)	28 – 36	Glebe Dirty Reds (B)	Saturday, 29 June, 12:30pm	4 Pines Park	Blake Williams
Penrith Brothers (B)	28 – 20	Cabramatta Two Blues	Saturday, 29 June, 4:30pm	Parker Street Reserve	Tom Stindl
Moorebank Rams	18 – 38	Mount Pritchard Mounties (B)	Saturday, 29 June, 4:30pm	Hammondville Oval	Louis Matheson
Hills District Bulls (B)	28 – 24	Ryde-Eastwood Hawks (B)	Sunday, 30 June, 1:00pm	Crestwood Reserve	Ethan Klein
Wentworthville Magpies (B)	23 – 4	St Marys Saints (B)	Sunday, 30 June, 1:00pm	Ringrose Park	Nathan Loveday

Round 14

Home	Score	Away	Match Information
Home	Score	Away	Date and Time	Venue	Referee
Cabramatta Two Blues	29 – 28	Moorebank Rams	Saturday, 6 July, 5:00pm	New Era Stadium	Billy Greatbatch
Wentworthville Magpies (B)	26 – 8	Manly Warringah Sea Eagles (B)	Sunday, 7 July, 1:00pm	Ringrose Park	Ethan Klein
Ryde-Eastwood Hawks (B)	32 – 18	St Marys Saints (B)	Sunday, 7 July, 1:00pm	TG Milner Field	Dillan Wells
Penrith Brothers (B)	BYE	Mount Pritchard Mounties (B)
Glebe Dirty Reds (B)	BYE	Hills District Bulls (B)

Round 15

Home	Score	Away	Match Information
Home	Score	Away	Date and Time	Venue	Referee
Wentworthville Magpies (B)	19 – 18	Mount Pritchard Mounties (B)	Saturday, 13 July, 1:00pm	Ringrose Park	Dillan Wells
Ryde-Eastwood Hawks (B)	18 – 24	Penrith Brothers (B)	Saturday, 13 July, 1:00pm	TG Milner Field	Tom Stindl
Glebe Dirty Reds (B)	20 – 22	Cabramatta Two Blues	Sunday, 14 July, 10:00am	Wentworth Park	Billy Greatbatch
Hills District Bulls (B)	26 – 32	Moorebank Rams	Sunday, 14 July, 1:00pm	Crestwood Reserve	Ethan Klein
Manly Warringah Sea Eagles (B)	22 – 40	St Marys Saints (B)	Sunday, 14 July, 3:00pm	Lionel Watts Park	Michael Ford

Round 16

Home	Score	Away	Match Information
Home	Score	Away	Date and Time	Venue	Referee
Mount Pritchard Mounties (B)	20 – 24	Ryde-Eastwood Hawks (B)	Saturday, 20 July, 11:00am	Aubrey Keech Reserve	Billy Greatbatch
Penrith Brothers (B)	32 – 38	Glebe Dirty Reds (B)	Saturday, 20 July, 1:00pm	Parker Street Reserve	Tom Stindl
St Marys Saints (B)	42 – 42	Hills District Bulls (B)	Saturday, 20 July, 1:00pm	St Marys Leagues Stadium	Ethan Klein
Cabramatta Two Blues	10 – 38	Wentworthville Magpies (B)	Saturday, 20 July, 4:00pm	New Era Stadium	Michael Ford
Manly Warringah Sea Eagles (B)	28 – 16	Moorebank Rams	Sunday, 21 July, 1:30pm	Lionel Watts Park	Louis Matheson

Round 17

Home	Score	Away	Match Information
Home	Score	Away	Date and Time	Venue	Referee
St Marys Saints (B)	12 – 18	Mount Pritchard Mounties (B)	Saturday, 27 July, 1:00pm	St Marys Leagues Stadium	Louis Matheson
Moorebank Rams	18 – 38	Ryde-Eastwood Hawks (B)	Saturday, 27 July, 4:30pm	Hammondville Oval	Billy Greatbatch
Manly Warringah Sea Eagles (B)	38 – 6	Cabramatta Two Blues	Sunday, 28 July, 12:00pm	Sydney Academy of Sport and Recreation	Blake Williams
Glebe Dirty Reds (B)	40 – 26	Hills District Bulls (B)	Sunday, 28 July, 1:00pm	Wentworth Park	Nathan Loveday
Wentworthville Magpies (B)	14 – 32	Penrith Brothers (B)	Sunday, 28 July, 1:00pm	Ringrose Park	Brendan Mani

Round 18

Home	Score	Away	Match Information
Home	Score	Away	Date and Time	Venue	Referee
Mount Pritchard Mounties (B)	36 – 30	Cabramatta Two Blues	Saturday, 3 August, 1:00pm	Aubrey Keech Reserve	Billy Greatbatch
St Marys Saints (B)	50 – 22	Moorebank Rams	Saturday, 3 August, 3:00pm	St Marys Leagues Stadium	Blake Williams
Wentworthville Magpies (B)	46 – 14	Hills District Bulls (B)	Saturday, 3 August, 6:00pm	Ringrose Park	Michael Ford
Penrith Brothers (B)	16 – 24	Manly Warringah Sea Eagles (B)	Sunday, 4 August, 1:00pm	Parker Street Reserve	Louis Matheson
Ryde-Eastwood Hawks (B)	20 – 20	Glebe Dirty Reds (B)	Sunday, 4 August, 1:00pm	TG Milner Field	Nathan Loveday

Round 19

Home	Score	Away	Match Information
Home	Score	Away	Date and Time	Venue	Referee
St Marys Saints (B)	48 – 20	Cabramatta Two Blues	Saturday, 10 August, 1:00pm	St Marys Leagues Stadium	Nathan Loveday
Moorebank Rams	10 – 52	Penrith Brothers (B)	Saturday, 10 August, 4:30pm	Hammondville Oval	Blake Williams
Glebe Dirty Reds (B)	12 – 40	Wentworthville Magpies (B)	Sunday, 11 August, 11:00am	Wentworth Park	Billy Greatbatch
Hills District Bulls (B)	22 – 36	Mount Pritchard Mounties (B)	Sunday, 11 August, 1:00pm	Crestwood Reserve	Louis Matheson
Ryde-Eastwood Hawks (B)	28 – 22	Manly Warringah Sea Eagles (B)	Sunday, 11 August, 3:00pm	TG Milner Field	Brendan Mani

Round 20

Home	Score	Away	Match Information
Home	Score	Away	Date and Time	Venue	Referee
Mount Pritchard Mounties (B)	6 – 50	Penrith Brothers (B)	Saturday, 17 August, 11:00am	Aubrey Keech Reserve	Billy Greatbatch
Ryde-Eastwood Hawks (B)	0 – 0*	Cabramatta Two Blues	Saturday, 17 August, 1:00pm	TG Milner Field	N/A
Manly Warringah Sea Eagles (B)	38 – 26	Hills District Bulls (B)	Saturday, 17 August, 2:15pm	4 Pines Park	Ethan Klein
Moorebank Rams	14 – 54	Wentworthville Magpies (B)	Saturday, 17 August, 4:30pm	Hammondville Oval	Brayden Hunt
Glebe Dirty Reds (B)	12 – 44	St Marys Saints (B)	Sunday, 18 August, 10:00am	Wentworth Park	Blake Williams

==== Finals Series ====
Qualifying Final
2	Ryde-Eastwood	44
3	Mount Pritchard	30
4	St Marys	32
5	Penrith	58

Major Semi-Final
1	Wentworthville	38
2	Ryde-Eastwood	22
Minor Semi-Final
3	Mount Pritchard	22
5	Penrith	25

Preliminary Final
2	Ryde-Eastwood	16
5	Penrith	38

Grand Final
1	Wentworthville	18
5	Penrith	43

Home	Score	Away	Match Information
Home	Score	Away	Date and Time	Venue	Referee	Video
Qualifying & Elimination Finals
St Marys Saints (B)	32 – 58	Penrith Brothers (B)	Saturday, 24 August, 11:00am	St Marys Leagues Stadium	Mitchell Currie
Ryde-Eastwood Hawks (B)	44 – 30	Mount Pritchard Mounties (B)	Saturday, 24 August, 3:00pm	St Marys Leagues Stadium	Karra-Lee Nolan
Major & Minor Semi-Finals
Mount Pritchard Mounties (B)	22 – 25	Penrith Brothers (B)	Saturday, 31 August, 11:00am	Ringrose Park	Karra-Lee Nolan
Wentworthville Magpies (B)	38 – 22	Ryde-Eastwood Hawks (B)	Saturday, 31 August, 2:30pm	Ringrose Park	Mitchell Currie
Preliminary Final
Ryde-Eastwood Hawks (B)	16 – 38	Penrith Brothers (B)	Saturday, 7 September, 1:00pm	St Marys Leagues Stadium	Martin Jones
Grand Final
Wentworthville Magpies (B)	18 – 43	Penrith Brothers (B)	Saturday, 14 September, 3:00pm	Leichhardt Oval	Martin Jones

==== Grand Final ====
2024 Sydney Shield Grand Final

Saturday, 14 September
3:00pm (AEST)

Wentworthville Magpies	18 – 43	Penrith Brothers
Tries: Jaydn Field (4') 1 Josh Delailoa (30') 1 Ayden Carling (77') 1 Goals: Ayden Carling 3/3 (5', 32', 79')	1st: 12 – 18; 2nd: 6 – 25	Tries: 1 (14') Eddie Ene; 1 (34') Luke Philp; 1 (37') Dean Kammel; 1 (44') Kye Raven; 1 (58') Wayne Baxter; 1 (67') Soakimi Fakaua; 1 (72') Noah Nailagoliva; Goals: 6/6 Donovan Boney (15', 36', 38', 46', 59', 68'); 1/1 Luke Philp (74'); Field goals: 1 (80') Siaosi Sisifa

Leichhardt Oval, Sydney
Referee: Martin Jones
Player of the Match: Donovan Boney

Team lists:

FB	1	Dermot McKeever-King (c)
WG	2	Josh Delailoa
CE	3	Emosi Alamoti
CE	4	Elias Abou-Mrad
WG	5	Isikeli Iaqekoro
FE	6	Jadyn Field
HB	7	Liam Davidson
PR	8	Will Epere
HK	9	Ayden Carling
PR	10	Bill Salameh
SR	11	Michael Geddes
SR	12	Mose Feilo
LK	13	Kye Simsic
Substitutes:
IC	14	Joshua Hey
IC	15	Issac Rosario
IC	16	David Oxley
IC	17	Koevy Lemusu
Replacement:
RE	18	Deon Iro
Coach:
Nathan Carr

Officials:

Martin Jones (Referee)

Luke Heckendorf (Touch Judge)

John Woods (Touch Judge)

Gage Miles (In-Goal Judge)

Lachlan Greenfield (In-Goal Judge)

FB	1	Dean Kammel
WG	2	Michael Pokia
CE	4	Mitchell Owen
CE	21	Siaosi Sisifa (c)
WG	5	Wayne Baxter
FE	6	Donovan Boney
HB	19	Tyran Pettit-Young
PR	8	Eddie Ene
HK	9	Soakimi Fakaua
PR	10	Liam Harris
SR	12	Lachlan Whitehouse
SR	24	Josh Ruxton
LK	13	Noah Nailagoliva
Substitutes:
IC	3	Luke Philp
IC	14	Kye Raven
IC	16	Benjamin Williamson
IC	17	Mitchell Smith
Replacement:
RE	25	Joseph Malula Buhendwa
Coach:

== Under 21s ==
=== Jersey Flegg Cup ===
The Jersey Flegg Cup is the statewide men's under 21s competition.

==== Teams ====
Colours	Club	Home ground(s)	Head coach
	Canberra Raiders	GIO Stadium, Raiders Belconnen	TBA
	Canterbury-Bankstown Bulldogs	Belmore Sports Ground	TBA
	Cronulla-Sutherland Sharks	PointsBet Stadium	TBA
	Kaiviti Silktails	Churchill Park, Prince Charles Park	
	Manly Warringah Sea Eagles	4 Pines Park	TBA
	Melbourne Storm	Seabrook Reserve, AAMI Park	TBA
	New Zealand Warriors	North Harbour Stadium, Go Media Stadium	TBA
	Newcastle Knights	Newcastle Centre of Excellence, McDonald Jones Stadium	TBA
	Parramatta Eels	New Era Stadium, Eric Tweedale Stadium	TBA
	Penrith Panthers	BlueBet Stadium, St Marys Leagues Stadium, Parker Street Reserve	TBA
	South Sydney Rabbitohs	Redfern Oval, Accor Stadium	TBA
	St George Illawarra Dragons	Collegians Sporting Complex, Netstrada Jubilee Stadium	TBA
	Sydney Roosters	Wentworth Park	TBA
	Wests Tigers	Lidcombe Oval, Campbelltown Sports Stadium, Leichhardt Oval	TBA

==== Ladder ====
Pos	Team	Pld	W	D	L	B	PF	PA	PD	Pts
1	Canberra Raiders (U21s)	24	18	0	6	2	678	408	+270	40
2	Penrith Panthers (U21s)	24	16	0	8	2	641	398	+243	36
3	Canterbury-Bankstown Bulldogs (U21s)	24	16	0	8	2	618	414	+204	36
4	Newcastle Knights (U21s)	24	15	1	8	2	516	454	+62	35
5	Cronulla-Sutherland Sharks (U21s)	24	14	1	9	2	678	435	+243	33
6	Parramatta Eels (U21s)	24	14	0	10	2	527	422	+105	32
7	Wests Tigers (U21s)	24	14	0	10	2	517	498	+19	32
8	Manly Warringah Sea Eagles (U21s)	24	13	0	11	2	569	475	+94	30
9	Sydney Roosters (U21s)	24	12	0	12	2	540	433	+107	28
10	St George Illawarra Dragons (U21s)	24	11	0	13	2	576	595	–19	26
11	New Zealand Warriors (U21s)	24	8	1	15	2	392	582	-190	21
12	Melbourne Storm (U21s)	24	8	0	16	2	464	556	–92	20
13	South Sydney Rabbitohs (U21s)	24	7	1	16	2	312	684	-372	19
14	Kaiviti Silktails (U21s)	24	0	0	24	2	246	920	-674	4

Updated to match(es) played on 31 August. Source:
Rules for classification: 1) points; 2) point difference; 3) points scored

===== Ladder progression =====
- Numbers highlighted in green indicate that the team finished the round inside the top 5.
- Numbers highlighted in blue indicates the team finished first on the ladder in that round.
- Numbers highlighted in red indicates the team finished last place on the ladder in that round.
- Underlined numbers indicate that the team had a bye during that round.

Pos	Team	1	2	3	4	6	7	8	9	10	11	12	13	14	15	16	17	18	19	20	5	21	22	23	24	25	26
1	Canberra Raiders (U21s)	2	4	6	8	10	12	14	14	16	18	18	20	22	24	26	28	30	30	32	32	34	36	38	40	40	40
2	Canterbury-Bankstown Bulldogs (U21s)	2	4	4	6	8	8	10	12	14	16	16	18	20	22	24	26	28	30	30	30	32	32	34	34	34	36
3	Penrith Panthers (U21s)	2	4	6	6	8	8	8	10	10	12	14	16	18	18	20	22	24	26	28	28	30	30	30	32	34	36
4	Newcastle Knights (U21s)	0	2	4	6	8	10	10	11	11	13	15	15	17	19	21	23	23	25	25	25	27	29	31	31	33	35
5	Cronulla-Sutherland Sharks (U21s)	2	2	2	2	3	5	5	7	7	9	9	9	11	13	13	15	17	17	19	21	23	25	27	29	31	33
6	Manly Warringah Sea Eagles (U21s)	0	2	4	4	6	6	6	8	10	14	16	16	16	18	20	22	24	24	24	24	26	28	28	30	30	30
7	Parramatta Eels (U21s)	0	0	0	0	0	0	2	4	4	6	8	10	12	14	14	14	16	18	20	20	22	24	26	28	30	32
8	Wests Tigers (U21s)	2	2	4	6	8	10	12	12	14	16	16	18	18	20	20	20	20	22	22	22	24	26	26	28	30	32
9	Sydney Roosters (U21s)	0	0	2	4	4	6	6	8	10	14	16	16	16	16	16	16	16	16	18	18	20	20	22	24	26	28
10	St George Illawarra Dragons (U21s)	2	2	4	6	8	8	10	10	10	12	14	14	14	14	16	16	18	20	22	22	24	26	26	26	26	26
11	New Zealand Warriors (U21s)	0	0	0	0	0	2	4	5	5	7	9	11	13	13	13	13	13	13	15	15	17	17	19	19	21	21
12	Melbourne Storm (U21s)	0	2	2	4	8	8	8	8	10	12	12	14	14	14	16	16	16	18	18	18	20	20	20	20	20	20
13	South Sydney Rabbitohs (U21s)	2	4	4	4	5	7	9	9	11	15	15	15	15	15	15	17	17	17	17	17	19	19	19	19	19	19
14	Kaiviti Silktails (U21s)	0	0	0	0	0	0	0	0	0	2	2	2	2	2	2	2	2	2	2	2	4	4	4	4	4	4

Season Results:

Round 1

Home	Score	Away	Match Information
Home	Score	Away	Date and Time	Venue	Referee	Video
Penrith Panthers (U21s)	14 – 4	Sydney Roosters (U21s)	Saturday, 9 March, 1:00pm	St Marys Leagues Stadium	William Greatbatch
Manly Warringah Sea Eagles (U21s)	14 – 16	South Sydney Rabbitohs (U21s)	Saturday, 9 March, 1:30pm	4 Pines Park	Charlie Suters
Parramatta Eels (U21s)	6 – 30	Canterbury-Bankstown Bulldogs (U21s)	Saturday, 9 March, 1:30pm	Eric Tweedale Stadium	Dillan Wells
Wests Tigers (U21s)	38 – 20	Kaiviti Silktails (U21s)	Saturday, 9 March, 2:00pm	Lidcombe Oval	Tom Stindl
Newcastle Knights (U21s)	18 – 30	Canberra Raiders (U21s)	Saturday, 9 March, 3:30pm	St John Oval	Nathan Loveday
New Zealand Warriors (U21s)	10 – 36	Cronulla-Sutherland Sharks (U21s)	Sunday, 10 March, 1:45pm	Navigation Home Stadium	Paki Parkinson
St George Illawarra Dragons (U21s)	36 – 14	Melbourne Storm (U21s)	Sunday, 10 March, 2:00pm	Collegians Sporting Complex	Michael Ford

Round 2

Home	Score	Away	Match Information
Home	Score	Away	Date and Time	Venue	Referee	Video
Canberra Raiders (U21s)	36 – 0	Wests Tigers (U21s)	Saturday, 16 March, 11:00am	GIO Stadium	Adam Sirianni
Kaiviti Silktails (U21s)	14 – 20	South Sydney Rabbitohs (U21s)	Saturday, 16 March, 12:00pm	Churchill Park	William Greatbatch
St George Illawarra Dragons (U21s)	4 – 28	Newcastle Knights (U21s)	Saturday, 16 March, 12:15pm	Sid Parrish Park	Brayden Hunt
Canterbury-Bankstown Bulldogs (U21s)	34 – 8	Cronulla-Sutherland Sharks (U21s)	Saturday, 16 March, 1:00pm	Terry Lamb Complex	Lachlan Greenfield
Penrith Panthers (U21s)	22 – 0	Parramatta Eels (U21s)	Saturday, 16 March, 3:15pm	St Marys Leagues Stadium	Charlie Suters
Melbourne Storm (U21s)	36 – 10	New Zealand Warriors (U21s)	Saturday, 16 March, 5:00pm	AAMI Park	Blake Williams
Manly Warringah Sea Eagles (U21s)	14 – 10	Sydney Roosters (U21s)	Sunday, 17 March, 12:00pm	4 Pines Park	Paul Eden

Round 3

Home	Score	Away	Match Information
Home	Score	Away	Date and Time	Venue	Referee	Video
Canberra Raiders (U21s)	44 – 12	New Zealand Warriors (U21s)	Saturday, 23 March, 12:15pm	Seiffert Oval	Ethan Klein
Parramatta Eels (U21s)	6 – 24	Manly Warringah Sea Eagles (U21s)	Saturday, 23 March, 3:00pm	New Era Stadium	Brayden Hunt
St George Illawarra Dragons (U21s)	50 – 12	Kaiviti Silktails (U21s)	Saturday, 23 March, 3:10pm	Netstrada Jubilee Stadium	Adam Sirianni
Wests Tigers (U21s)	38 – 18	Cronulla-Sutherland Sharks (U21s)	Sunday, 24 March, 12:00pm	Lidcombe Oval	Charlie Suters
Newcastle Knights (U21s)	34 – 12	Melbourne Storm (U21s)	Sunday, 24 March, 2:00pm	McDonald Jones Stadium	Lachlan Greenfield
Canterbury-Bankstown Bulldogs (U21s)	18 – 35	Penrith Panthers (U21s)	Sunday, 24 March, 2:45pm	Hammondville Oval	Blake Williams
Sydney Roosters (U21s)	30 – 4	South Sydney Rabbitohs (U21s)	Sunday, 24 March, 3:00pm	Wentworth Park	Paul Eden

Round 4

Home	Score	Away	Match Information
Home	Score	Away	Date and Time	Venue	Referee	Video
South Sydney Rabbitohs (U21s)	12 – 30	Canterbury-Bankstown Bulldogs (U21s)	Friday, 29 March, 10:30am	Redfern Oval	Paul Eden
St George Illawarra Dragons (U21s)	30 – 28	Manly Warringah Sea Eagles (U21s)	Saturday, 30 March, 11:30am	Michael Cronin Oval	Blake Williams
Parramatta Eels (U21s)	22 – 24	Wests Tigers (U21s)	Saturday, 30 March, 3:00pm	New Era Stadium	Adam Sirianni
Melbourne Storm (U21s)	36 – 10	Kaiviti Silktails (U21s)	Saturday, 30 March, 4:00pm	Seabrook Reserve	Brayden Hunt
Sydney Roosters (U21s)	28 – 10	Penrith Panthers (U21s)	Sunday, 31 March, 1:15pm	Wentworth Park	Ethan Klein
New Zealand Warriors (U21s)	8 – 18	Newcastle Knights (U21s)	Sunday, 31 March, 1:30pm	Go Media Stadium	Joseph Green
Cronulla-Sutherland Sharks (U21s)	4 – 30	Canberra Raiders (U21s)	Sunday, 31 March, 4:00pm	PointsBet Stadium	Lachlan Greenfield

Round 5

Home	Score	Away	Match Information
Home	Score	Away	Date and Time	Venue	Referee	Video
Melbourne Storm (U21s)	28 – 18	Wests Tigers (U21s)	Saturday, 6 April, 2:00pm	Seabrook Reserve	Paul Eden
Newcastle Knights (U21s)	16 – 30	St George Illawarra Dragons (U21s)	Saturday, 6 April, 4:00pm	Newcastle Centre of Excellence	Brayden Hunt
Canberra Raiders (U21s)	22 – 16	Parramatta Eels (U21s)	Sunday, 7 April, 12:00pm	Raiders Belconnen	Blake Williams
Manly Warringah Sea Eagles (U21s)	34 – 20	Penrith Panthers (U21s)	Saturday, 18 May, 11:00am	Aubrey Keech Reserve	Paul Eden
South Sydney Rabbitohs (U21s)	20 – 10	New Zealand Warriors (U21s)	Saturday, 18 May, 12:00pm	Redfern Oval	Lachlan Greenfield
Canterbury-Bankstown Bulldogs (U21s)	16 – 24	Sydney Roosters (U21s)	Saturday, 18 May, 12:00pm	Belmore Sports Ground	Blake Williams
Kaiviti Silktails (U21s)	0 – 50	Cronulla-Sutherland Sharks (U21s)	Saturday, 27 July, 10:30am	Henson Park	TBA

Round 6

Home	Score	Away	Match Information
Home	Score	Away	Date and Time	Venue	Referee	Video
Wests Tigers (U21s)	31 – 22	St George Illawarra Dragons (U21s)	Saturday, 13 April, 12:00pm	Lidcombe Oval	Adam Sirianni
New Zealand Warriors (U21s)	16 – 20	Manly Warringah Sea Eagles (U21s)	Saturday, 13 April, 12:45pm	Go Media Stadium	Joseph Green
South Sydney Rabbitohs (U21s)	20 – 20	Cronulla-Sutherland Sharks (U21s)	Saturday, 13 April, 1:00pm	Pioneer Oval	Paul Eden
Parramatta Eels (U21s)	12 – 24	Melbourne Storm (U21s)	Saturday, 13 April, 3:00pm	New Era Stadium	Charlie Suters
Kaiviti Silktails (U21s)	14 – 52	Penrith Panthers (U21s)	Saturday, 14 April, 4:00pm	Churchill Park	Ethan Klein
Canberra Raiders (U21s)	12 – 38	Canterbury-Bankstown Bulldogs (U21s)	Sunday, 14 April, 12:00pm	Raiders Belconnen	Lachlan Greenfield
Newcastle Knights (U21s)	22 – 18	Sydney Roosters (U21s)	Sunday, 14 April, 1:00pm	Newcastle Centre of Excellence	Brayden Hunt

Round 7

Home	Score	Away	Match Information
Home	Score	Away	Date and Time	Venue	Referee	Video
Penrith Panthers (U21s)	18 – 20	Wests Tigers (U21s)	Saturday, 20 April, 11:15am	BlueBet Stadium	Dillan Wells
St George Illawarra Dragons (U21s)	22 – 28	New Zealand Warriors (U21s)	Saturday, 20 April, 11:15am	Collegians Sporting Complex	Ethan Klein
South Sydney Rabbitohs (U21s)	22 – 14	Kaiviti Silktails (U21s)	Saturday, 20 April, 1:00pm	Erskinville Oval	Brayden Hunt
Melbourne Storm (U21s)	16 – 24	Canberra Raiders (U21s)	Saturday, 20 April, 2:00pm	Seabrook Reserve	Adam Sirianni
Newcastle Knights (U21s)	26 – 20	Canterbury-Bankstown Bulldogs (U21s)	Sunday, 21 April, 1:00pm	Newcastle Centre of Excellence	Martin Jones
Sydney Roosters (U21s)	36 – 24	Parramatta Eels (U21s)	Sunday, 21 April, 1:15pm	Wentworth Park	Paul Eden
Cronulla-Sutherland Sharks (U21s)	30 – 10	Manly Warringah Sea Eagles (U21s)	Sunday, 21 April, 1:50pm	PointsBet Stadium	Lachlan Greenfield

Round 8

Home	Score	Away	Match Information
Home	Score	Away	Date and Time	Venue	Referee	Video
New Zealand Warriors (U21s)	28 – 20	Penrith Panthers (U21s)	Saturday, 27 April, 10:00am	North Harbour Stadium	Paki Parkinson
St George Illawarra Dragons (U21s)	30 – 24	Sydney Roosters (U21s)	Saturday, 27 April, 11:15am	Collegians Sporting Complex	Adam Sirianni
Canterbury-Bankstown Bulldogs (U21s)	60 – 0	Kaiviti Silktails (U21s)	Saturday, 27 April, 12:00pm	Belmore Sports Ground	Louis Matheson
Manly Warringah Sea Eagles (U21s)	16 – 26	Parramatta Eels (U21s)	Saturday, 28 April, 12:30pm	4 Pines Park	Charlie Suters
Wests Tigers (U21s)	28 – 24	Melbourne Storm (U21s)	Saturday, 27 April, 1:20pm	Campbelltown Sports Stadium	Brendan Mani
Canberra Raiders (U21s)	30 – 16	Cronulla-Sutherland Sharks (U21s)	Sunday, 28 April, 12:00pm	GIO Stadium	Brayden Hunt
Newcastle Knights (U21s)	14 – 20	South Sydney Rabbitohs (U21s)	Sunday, 28 April, 1:00pm	Newcastle Centre of Excellence	Lachlan Greenfield

Round 9

Home	Score	Away	Match Information
Home	Score	Away	Date and Time	Venue	Referee	Video
Canterbury-Bankstown Bulldogs (U21s)	22 – 10	Wests Tigers (U21s)	Friday, 3 May, 7:00pm	Belmore Sports Ground	Mitchell Pitscheider
South Sydney Rabbitohs (U21s)	12 – 32	Penrith Panthers (U21s)	Friday, 3 May, 7:00pm	Windsor Sporting Complex	Brayden Hunt
Manly Warringah Sea Eagles (U21s)	24 – 16	Canberra Raiders (U21s)	Saturday, 4 May, 12:00pm	4 Pines Park	Adam Sirianni
Kaiviti Silktails (U21s)	22 – 42	Parramatta Eels (U21s)	Saturday, 4 May, 12:00pm	Churchill Park	Blake Williams
Melbourne Storm (U21s)	8 – 38	Sydney Roosters (U21s)	Saturday, 4 May, 2:00pm	Seabrook Reserve	Gage Miles
Newcastle Knights (U21s)	14 – 14	New Zealand Warriors (U21s)	Sunday, 5 May, 9:45am	Newcastle Centre of Excellence	Brendan Mani
Cronulla-Sutherland Sharks (U21s)	22 – 16	St George Illawarra Dragons (U21s)	Sunday, 5 May, 1:50pm	PointsBet Stadium	Lachlan Greenfield

Round 10

Home	Score	Away	Match Information
Home	Score	Away	Date and Time	Venue	Referee	Video
Kaiviti Silktails (U21s)	8 – 56	Canberra Raiders (U21s)	Saturday, 11 May, 12:00pm	Prince Charles Park	Michael Ford
St George Illawarra Dragons (U21s)	16 – 18	South Sydney Rabbitohs (U21s)	Saturday, 11 May, 3:00pm	Netstrada Jubilee Stadium	Paul Eden
Penrith Panthers (U21s)	0 – 10	Canterbury-Bankstown Bulldogs (U21s)	Saturday, 11 May, 4:00pm	Parker Street Reserve	Louis Matheson
Melbourne Storm (U21s)	20 – 4	Parramatta Eels (U21s)	Saturday, 11 May, 4:45pm	AAMI Park	Mitchell Pitscheider
New Zealand Warriors (U21s)	22 – 34	Sydney Roosters (U21s)	Sunday, 12 May, 10:00am	North Harbour Stadium	Joseph Green
Manly Warringah Sea Eagles (U21s)	27 – 26	Cronulla-Sutherland Sharks (U21s)	Sunday, 12 May, 11:00am	HE Laybutt Field	Brendan Mani
Wests Tigers (U21s)	26 – 16	Newcastle Knights (U21s)	Sunday, 12 May, 12:00pm	Lidcombe Oval	Blake Williams

Round 11

Home	Score	Away	Match Information
Home	Score	Away	Date and Time	Venue	Referee	Video
Canterbury-Bankstown Bulldogs (U21s)	BYE	St George Illawarra Dragons (U21s)
Newcastle Knights (U21s)	BYE	Penrith Panthers (U21s)
South Sydney Rabbitohs (U21s)	BYE	Canberra Raiders (U21s)
Sydney Roosters (U21s)	BYE	Manly Warringah Sea Eagles (U21s)
Cronulla-Sutherland Sharks (U21s)	BYE	Kaiviti Silktails (U21s)
Melbourne Storm (U21s)	BYE	New Zealand Warriors (U21s)
Wests Tigers (U21s)	BYE	Parramatta Eels (U21s)

Round 12

Home	Score	Away	Match Information
Home	Score	Away	Date and Time	Venue	Referee	Video
Manly Warringah Sea Eagles (U21s)	22 – 10	Wests Tigers (U21s)	Friday, 24 May, 6:00pm	4 Pines Park	Mitchell Pitscheider
Canterbury-Bankstown Bulldogs (U21s)	22 – 34	St George Illawarra Dragons (U21s)	Friday, 24 May, 7:00pm	Belmore Sports Ground	Adam Sirianni
Canberra Raiders (U21s)	20 – 24	Sydney Roosters (U21s)	Saturday, 25 May, 11:00am	GIO Stadium	Gage Miles
South Sydney Rabbitohs (U21s)	8 – 26	Parramatta Eels (U21s)	Saturday, 25 May, 11:00am	Erskinville Oval	Paul Eden
Newcastle Knights (U21s)	52 – 18	Kaiviti Silktails (U21s)	Saturday, 25 May, 1:00pm	Newcastle Centre of Excellence	Brayden Hunt
Cronulla-Sutherland Sharks (U21s)	14 – 16	Penrith Panthers (U21s)	Saturday, 25 May, 3:15pm	PointsBet Stadium	Lachlan Greenfield
New Zealand Warriors (U21s)	28 – 24	Melbourne Storm (U21s)	Sunday, 26 May, 1:00pm	Go Media Stadium	Joseph Green

Round 13

Home	Score	Away	Match Information
Home	Score	Away	Date and Time	Venue	Referee	Video
Canberra Raiders (U21s)	56 – 0	Kaiviti Silktails (U21s)	Saturday, 1 June, 12:00pm	Raiders Belconnen	Gage Miles
Canterbury-Bankstown Bulldogs (U21s)	32 – 4	Newcastle Knights (U21s)	Saturday, 1 June, 12:00pm	Belmore Sports Ground	Lachlan Greenfield
Cronulla-Sutherland Sharks (U21s)	16 – 26	Parramatta Eels (U21s)	Saturday, 1 June, 1:00pm	PointsBet Stadium	Paul Eden
South Sydney Rabbitohs (U21s)	0 – 52	Wests Tigers (U21s)	Saturday, 1 June, 1:00pm	Redfern Oval	Brayden Hunt
Penrith Panthers (U21s)	38 – 12	St George Illawarra Dragons (U21s)	Saturday, 1 June, 1:20pm	BlueBet Stadium	Adam Sirianni
Melbourne Storm (U21s)	22 – 18	Manly Warringah Sea Eagles (U21s)	Saturday, 1 June, 2:00pm	Seabrook Reserve	Brendan Mani
Sydney Roosters (U21s)	16 – 20	New Zealand Warriors (U21s)	Sunday, 2 June, 1:15pm	Wentworth Park	Mitchell Pitscheider

Round 14

Home	Score	Away	Match Information
Home	Score	Away	Date and Time	Venue	Referee	Video
Canterbury-Bankstown Bulldogs (U21s)	38 – 14	South Sydney Rabbitohs (U21s)	Friday, 7 June, 7:00pm	Belmore Sports Ground	Mitchell Pitscheider
Kaiviti Silktails (U21s)	10 – 16	New Zealand Warriors (U21s)	Saturday, 8 June, 10:00am	Churchill Park	Paul Eden
St George Illawarra Dragons (U21s)	16 – 20	Parramatta Eels (U21s)	Saturday, 8 June, 12:00pmam	Eric Tweedale Stadium	Gage Miles
Cronulla-Sutherland Sharks (U21s)	18 – 10	Sydney Roosters (U21s)	Saturday, 8 June, 12:00pm	Henson Park	Louis Matheson
Wests Tigers (U21s)	8 – 10	Canberra Raiders (U21s)	Saturday, 8 June, 12:00pm	Lidcombe Oval	Brendan Mani
Melbourne Storm (U21s)	18 – 22	Penrith Panthers (U21s)	Sunday, 9 June, 11:30am	AAMI Park	Lachlan Greenfield
Newcastle Knights (U21s)	26 – 24	Manly Warringah Sea Eagles (U21s)	Sunday, 9 June, 1:00pm	Newcastle Centre of Excellence	Brayden Hunt

Round 15

Home	Score	Away	Match Information
Home	Score	Away	Date and Time	Venue	Referee	Video
Cronulla-Sutherland Sharks (U21s)	34 – 20	Melbourne Storm (U21s)	Thursday, 13 June, 5:35pm	PointsBet Stadium	Gage Miles
Wests Tigers (U21s)	28 – 16	New Zealand Warriors (U21s)	Saturday, 15 June, 10:55am	Leichhardt Oval	Paul Eden
Kaiviti Silktails (U21s)	14 – 18	Canterbury-Bankstown Bulldogs (U21s)	Saturday, 15 June, 12:00pm	Churchill Park	Adam Sirianni
Parramatta Eels (U21s)	30 – 8	Sydney Roosters (U21s)	Saturday, 15 June, 3:00pm	New Era Stadium	Mitchell Pitscheider
Newcastle Knights (U21s)	24 – 4	Penrith Panthers (U21s)	Sunday, 16 June, 11:40am	McDonald Jones Stadium	Blake Williams
Manly Warringah Sea Eagles (U21s)	36 – 16	St George Illawarra Dragons (U21s)	Sunday, 16 June, 11:45am	4 Pines Park	Brayden Hunt
Canberra Raiders (U21s)	30 – 18	South Sydney Rabbitohs (U21s)	Sunday, 16 June, 2:00pm	Raiders Belconnen	Brendan Mani

Round 16

Home	Score	Away	Match Information
Home	Score	Away	Date and Time	Venue	Referee	Video
New Zealand Warriors (U21s)	14 – 46	St George Illawarra Dragons (U21s)	Saturday, 22 June, 10:00am	North Harbour Stadium	Joseph Green
Kaiviti Silktails (U21s)	10 – 28	Melbourne Storm (U21s)	Saturday, 22 June, 11:00am	Prince Charles Park	Brendan Mani
Penrith Panthers (U21s)	38 – 18	Cronulla-Sutherland Sharks (U21s)	Saturday, 22 June, 12:00pm	BlueBet Stadium	Adam Sirianni
Parramatta Eels (U21s)	16 – 18	Canberra Raiders (U21s)	Saturday, 22 June, 1:00pm	Eric Tweedale Stadium	Lachlan Greenfield
Sydney Roosters (U21s)	16 – 18	Newcastle Knights (U21s)	Saturday, 22 June, 1:05pm	Industree Group Stadium	Louis Matheson
South Sydney Rabbitohs (U21s)	6 – 34	Manly Warringah Sea Eagles (U21s)	Saturday, 22 June, 3:25pm	Accor Stadium	Brayden Hunt
Wests Tigers (U21s)	12 – 26	Canterbury-Bankstown Bulldogs (U21s)	Sunday, 23 June, 11:50am	Campbelltown Sports Stadium	Blake Williams

Round 17

Home	Score	Away	Match Information
Home	Score	Away	Date and Time	Venue	Referee	Video
New Zealand Warriors (U21s)	24 – 34	Canberra Raiders (U21s)	Saturday, 29 June, 10:45am	Go Media Stadium	Viggo Rasmussen
Sydney Roosters (U21s)	6 – 18	Cronulla-Sutherland Sharks (U21s)	Saturday, 29 June, 10:45am	Wentworth Park	Brendan Mani
Manly Warringah Sea Eagles (U21s)	48 – 8	Kaiviti Silktails (U21s)	Saturday, 29 June, 11:00am	4 Pines Park	Lachlan Greenfield
Wests Tigers (U21s)	0 – 62	Penrith Panthers (U21s)	Saturday, 29 June, 12:00pm	Lidcombe Oval	Gage Miles
South Sydney Rabbitohs (U21s)	20 – 18	St George Illawarra Dragons (U21s)	Saturday, 29 June, 1:00pm	Redfern Oval	Michael Ford
Newcastle Knights (U21s)	34 – 18	Parramatta Eels (U21s)	Saturday, 29 June, 1:15pm	McDonald Jones Stadium	Mitchell Pitscheider
Melbourne Storm (U21s)	0 – 24	Canterbury-Bankstown Bulldogs (U21s)	Saturday, 29 June, 4:45pm	AAMI Park	Brayden Hunt

Round 18

Home	Score	Away	Match Information
Home	Score	Away	Date and Time	Venue	Referee	Video
Cronulla-Sutherland Sharks (U21s)	20 – 16	Wests Tigers (U21s)	Saturday, 6 July, 12:30pm	Henson Park	Michael Ford
Penrith Panthers (U21s)	36 – 16	Kaiviti Silktails (U21s)	Saturday, 6 July, 1:00pm	BlueBet Stadium	Brayden Hunt
Manly Warringah Sea Eagles (U21s)	20 – 16	Melbourne Storm (U21s)	Saturday, 6 July, 1:30pm	4 Pines Park	Mitchell Pitscheider
Parramatta Eels (U21s)	46 – 0	South Sydney Rabbitohs (U21s)	Saturday, 6 July, 3:00pm	New Era Stadium	Brendan Mani
Canberra Raiders (U21s)	30 – 14	Newcastle Knights (U21s)	Sunday, 7 July, 12:00pm	GIO Stadium	Gage Miles
Canterbury-Bankstown Bulldogs (U21s)	30 – 6	New Zealand Warriors (U21s)	Sunday, 7 July, 12:00pm	Belmore Sports Ground	Blake Williams
Sydney Roosters (U21s)	24 – 34	St George Illawarra Dragons (U21s)	Sunday, 7 July, 12:15pm	Wentworth Park	Adam Sirianni

Round 19

Home	Score	Away	Match Information
Home	Score	Away	Date and Time	Venue	Referee	Video
Cronulla-Sutherland Sharks (U21s)	22 – 24	Canterbury-Bankstown Bulldogs (U21s)	Friday, 12 July, 5:45pm	PointsBet Stadium	Brayden Hunt
Kaiviti Silktails (U21s)	8 – 38	St George Illawarra Dragons (U21s)	Saturday, 13 July, 12:00pm	Churchill Park	Joseph Green
Penrith Panthers (U21s)	26 – 12	Canberra Raiders (U21s)	Saturday, 13 July, 12:00pm	BlueBet Stadium	Blake Williams
Parramatta Eels (U21s)	18 – 6	New Zealand Warriors (U21s)	Saturday, 13 July, 1:00pm	Lidcombe Oval	Adam Sirianni
Manly Warringah Sea Eagles (U21s)	10 – 26	Newcastle Knights (U21s)	Sunday, 14 July, 12:00pm	4 Pines Park	Brendan Mani
South Sydney Rabbitohs (U21s)	14 – 22	Melbourne Storm (U21s)	Sunday, 14 July, 1:00pm	Coogee Oval	Gage Miles
Sydney Roosters (U21s)	12 – 13	Wests Tigers (U21s)	Sunday, 14 July, 1:15pm	Wentworth Park	Louis Matheson

Round 20

Home	Score	Away	Match Information
Home	Score	Away	Date and Time	Venue	Referee	Video
Canterbury-Bankstown Bulldogs (U21s)	12 – 19	Parramatta Eels (U21s)	Friday, 19 July, 6:00pm	Belmore Sports Ground	Brendan Mani
Kaiviti Silktails (U21s)	4 – 16	New Zealand Warriors (U21s)	Saturday, 20 July, 10:00am	Churchill Park	Jack Feavers
Penrith Panthers (U21s)	36 – 24	Manly Warringah Sea Eagles (U21s)	Saturday, 20 July, 11:00am	St Marys Leagues Stadium	Blake Williams
South Sydney Rabbitohs (U21s)	8 – 28	Sydney Roosters (U21s)	Saturday, 20 July, 11:00am	Redfern Oval	Adam Sirianni
Canberra Raiders (U21s)	34 – 18	Melbourne Storm (U21s)	Saturday, 20 July, 12:15pm	Raiders Belconnen	Nathan Loveday
Newcastle Knights (U21s)	16 – 40	Cronulla-Sutherland Sharks (U21s)	Saturday, 20 July, 1:15pm	McDonald Jones Stadium	Brayden Hunt
St George Illawarra Dragons (U21s)	28 – 22	Wests Tigers (U21s)	Sunday, 21 July, 11:15am	Collegians Sporting Complex	Gage Miles

Round 21

Home	Score	Away	Match Information
Home	Score	Away	Date and Time	Venue	Referee	Video
Canterbury-Bankstown Bulldogs (U21s)	BYE	St George Illawarra Dragons (U21s)
Newcastle Knights (U21s)	BYE	Penrith Panthers (U21s)
South Sydney Rabbitohs (U21s)	BYE	Canberra Raiders (U21s)
Sydney Roosters (U21s)	BYE	Manly Warringah Sea Eagles (U21s)
Cronulla-Sutherland Sharks (U21s)	BYE	Kaiviti Silktails (U21s)
Melbourne Storm (U21s)	BYE	New Zealand Warriors (U21s)
Wests Tigers (U21s)	BYE	Parramatta Eels (U21s)

Round 22

Home	Score	Away	Match Information
Home	Score	Away	Date and Time	Venue	Referee	Video
New Zealand Warriors (U21s)	20 – 26	Parramatta Eels (U21s)	Saturday, 3 August, 10:00am	North Harbour Stadium	Jack Feavers
Kaiviti Silktails (U21s)	22 – 28	Manly Warringah Sea Eagles (U21s)	Saturday, 3 August, 10:00am	Churchill Park	Joseph Green
Wests Tigers (U21s)	18 – 10	Sydney Roosters (U21s)	Saturday, 3 August, 12:00pm	Lidcombe Oval	Lachlan Greenfield
Penrith Panthers (U21s)	20 – 26	Newcastle Knights (U21s)	Saturday, 3 August, 1:00pm	St Marys Leagues Stadium	Brayden Hunt
Melbourne Storm (U21s)	18 – 22	St George Illawarra Dragons (U21s)	Saturday, 3 August, 3:00pm	AAMI Park	Adam Sirianni
Canterbury-Bankstown Bulldogs (U21s)	18 – 36	Canberra Raiders (U21s)	Saturday, 3 August, 3:00pm	Hammondville Oval	Mitchell Pitscheider
Cronulla-Sutherland Sharks (U21s)	58 – 16	South Sydney Rabbitohs (U21s)	Saturday, 3 August, 5:20pm	PointsBet Stadium	Brendan Mani

Round 23

Home	Score	Away	Match Information
Home	Score	Away	Date and Time	Venue	Referee	Video
Canberra Raiders (U21s)	30 – 10	Manly Warringah Sea Eagles (U21s)	Saturday, 10 August, 10:30am	GIO Stadium	Gage Miles
St George Illawarra Dragons (U21s)	22 – 32	Canterbury-Bankstown Bulldogs (U21s)	Saturday, 10 August, 11:00am	Collegians Sporting Complex	Brayden Hunt
Kaiviti Silktails (U21s)	8 – 36	Sydney Roosters (U21s)	Saturday, 10 August, 12:00pm	Churchill Park	Lachlan Greenfield
Newcastle Knights (U21s)	24 – 14	Wests Tigers (U21s)	Saturday, 10 August, 1:00pm	Newcastle Centre of Excellence	Luke Saldern
Melbourne Storm (U21s)	16 – 54	Cronulla-Sutherland Sharks (U21s)	Saturday, 10 August, 2:00pm	Seabrook Reserve	Mitchell Pitscheider
Parramatta Eels (U21s)	30 – 14	Penrith Panthers (U21s)	Saturday, 10 August, 3:00pm	New Era Stadium	Adam Sirianni
New Zealand Warriors (U21s)	22 – 10	South Sydney Rabbitohs (U21s)	Sunday, 11 August, 10:00am	Bruce Pulman Park	Viggo Rasmussen

Round 24

Home	Score	Away	Match Information
Home	Score	Away	Date and Time	Venue	Referee	Video
Penrith Panthers (U21s)	22 – 16	Melbourne Storm (U21s)	Thursday, 15 August, 5:20pm	BlueBet Stadium	Blake Williams
Manly Warringah Sea Eagles (U21s)	36 – 10	New Zealand Warriors (U21s)	Saturday, 17 August, 11:00am	4 Pines Park	Lachlan Greenfield
Parramatta Eels (U21s)	26 – 8	Newcastle Knights (U21s)	Saturday, 17 August, 3:00pm	Eric Tweedale Stadium	Brayden Hunt
Wests Tigers (U21s)	36 – 20	South Sydney Rabbitohs (U21s)	Saturday, 17 August, 3:30pm	Campbelltown Sports Stadium	Blake Williams
St George Illawarra Dragons (U21s)	14 – 26	Canberra Raiders (U21s)	Sunday, 18 August, 11:15am	Collegians Sporting Complex	Adam Sirianni
Cronulla-Sutherland Sharks (U21s)	62 – 2	Kaiviti Silktails (U21s)	Sunday, 18 August, 11:30am	PointsBet Stadium	Mitchell Pitscheider
Sydney Roosters (U21s)	40 – 20	Canterbury-Bankstown Bulldogs (U21s)	Sunday, 18 August, 1:15pm	Wentworth Park	Gage Miles

Round 25

Home	Score	Away	Match Information
Home	Score	Away	Date and Time	Venue	Referee	Video
New Zealand Warriors (U21s)	32 – 16	Canterbury-Bankstown Bulldogs (U21s)	Saturday, 24 August, 10:00am	North Harbour Stadium	Jack Feavers
Canberra Raiders (U21s)	20 – 26	Penrith Panthers (U21s)	Saturday, 24 August, 10:30am	GIO Stadium	Blake Williams
St George Illawarra Dragons (U21s)	10 – 54	Cronulla-Sutherland Sharks (U21s)	Saturday, 24 August, 11:15am	Collegians Sporting Complex	Brayden Hunt
Wests Tigers (U21s)	23 – 22	Manly Warringah Sea Eagles (U21s)	Saturday, 24 August, 12:00pm	Lidcombe Oval	Adam Sirianni
Parramatta Eels (U21s)	28 – 12	Kaiviti Silktails (U21s)	Saturday, 24 August, 3:00pm	New Era Stadium	Lachlan Greenfield
South Sydney Rabbitohs (U21s)	14 – 22	Newcastle Knights (U21s)	Saturday, 24 August, 3:25pm	Accor Stadium	Mitchell Pitscheider
Sydney Roosters (U21s)	24 – 22	Melbourne Storm (U21s)	Sunday, 25 August, 1:15pm	Wentworth Park	Brandon Mani

Round 26

Home	Score	Away	Match Information
Home	Score	Away	Date and Time	Venue	Referee	Video
Kaiviti Silktails (U21s)	0 – 32	Wests Tigers (U21s)	Saturday, 31 August, 10:00am	Churchill Park	Joseph Green
Penrith Panthers (U21s)	58 – 0	South Sydney Rabbitohs (U21s)	Saturday, 31 August, 11:00am	St Marys Leagues Stadium	Gage Miles
Canterbury-Bankstown Bulldogs (U21s)	28 – 26	Manly Warringah Sea Eagles (U21s)	Saturday, 31 August, 12:00pm	Belmore Sports Ground	Brandon Mani
Parramatta Eels (U21s)	40 – 10	St George Illawarra Dragons (U21s)	Saturday, 31 August, 1:00pm	Eric Tweedale Stadium	Lachlan Greenfield
Melbourne Storm (U21s)	6 – 16	Newcastle Knights (U21s)	Saturday, 31 August, 2:00pm	Seabrook Reserve	Paul Eden
Cronulla-Sutherland Sharks (U21s)	20 – 4	New Zealand Warriors (U21s)	Saturday, 31 August, 5:20pm	PointsBet Stadium	Blake Williams
Sydney Roosters (U21s)	40 – 22	Canberra Raiders (U21s)	Sunday, 1 September, 2:00pm	Wentworth Park	Adam Sirianni

==== Finals Series ====
Qualifying Final
2	Penrith	6
3	Canterbury-Bankstown	32
4	Newcastle	6
5	Cronulla-Sutherland	22

Major Semi-Final
1	Canberra	14
3	Canterbury-Bankstown	15
Minor Semi-Final
2	Penrith	26
5	Cronulla-Sutherland	40

Preliminary Final
1	Canberra	18
5	Cronulla-Sutherland	38

Grand Final
3	Canterbury-Bankstown
5	Cronulla-Sutherland

Home	Score	Away	Match Information
Home	Score	Away	Date and Time	Venue	Referee	Video
Qualifying & Elimination Finals
Penrith Panthers (U21s)	6 – 32	Canterbury-Bankstown Bulldogs (U21s)	Saturday, 7 September, 11:00am	Leichhardt Oval	Cameron Turner
Newcastle Knights (U21s)	6 – 22	Cronulla-Sutherland Sharks (U21s)	Saturday, 7 September, 3:00pm	Leichhardt Oval	Mitchell Currie
Major & Minor Semi-Finals
Canberra Raiders (U21s)	14 – 15	Canterbury-Bankstown Bulldogs (U21s)	Sunday, 15 September, 11:00am	Leichhardt Oval	Mitchell Currie
Penrith Panthers (U21s)	26 – 40	Cronulla-Sutherland Sharks (U21s)	Sunday, 15 September, 3:00pm	Leichhardt Oval	Cameron Turner
Preliminary Final
Canberra Raiders (U21s)	18 – 38	Cronulla-Sutherland Sharks (U21s)	Saturday, 21 September, 11:00am	Leichhardt Oval	Damian Brady
Grand Final
Canterbury-Bankstown Bulldogs (U21s)	14 – 12	Cronulla-Sutherland Sharks (U21s)	Sunday, 29 September, 11:00am	CommBank Stadium	Damian Brady

== Country Championships ==
=== Men's Country Championships ===
The Men's Country Championships is the statewide open men's competition played in a knockout format.

==== Teams ====
Colours	Club	Home ground(s)	Head coach
	Central Coast Roosters	Morry Breen Oval	TBA
	Greater Northern Tigers	Scully Park, Farrer MAHS	TBA
	Illawarra-South Coast Dragons	Ron Costello Oval, Centenary Field	TBA
	Macarthur-Wests Tigers	Kirkham Oval	TBA
	Monaro Colts	NSWRL HQ Bruce	Jason Kelly
	Newcastle Rebels	Cessnock Sportsground	TBA
	North Coast Bulldogs	Port Macquarie Regional Stadium	TBA
	Northern Rivers Titans	Various	TBA
	Riverina Bulls	Laurie Daley Oval, McDonalds Park	TBA
	Western Rams	Various	TBA

===== Results =====
Home	Score	Away	Match Information
Home	Score	Away	Date and Time	Venue	Referee	Video
First Round
Newcastle Rebels	26 – 14	Central Coast Roosters	Saturday, 2 March, 12:30pm	Cessnock Sportsground	Louis Matheson
Western Rams	14 – 16	Greater Northern Tigers	Saturday, 2 March, 1:15pm	Cale Oval	Ryan Micallef
Illawarra-South Coast Dragons	24 – 36	Macarthur-Wests Tigers	Saturday, 2 March, 1:30pm	Centenary Field	Blake Williams
North Coast Bulldogs	6 – 36	Northern Rivers Titans	Sunday, 3 March, 1:00pm	Port Macquarie Regional Stadium	Mitchell Pitscheider
Riverina Bulls	30 – 36	Monaro Colts	Sunday, 3 March, 3:20pm	McDonalds Park	Gage Miles
Play-Off
Newcastle Rebels	0* – 0	Macarthur-Wests Tigers	Saturday, 9 March, 4:00pm	Cessnock Sportsground	N/A
Semi-Finals
Monaro Colts	12 – 8	Northern Rivers Titans	Saturday, 16 March, 12:30pm	NSWRL Centre of Excellence	Tom Stindl
Greater Northern Tigers	0 – 52	Newcastle Rebels	Sunday, 17 March, 2:00pm	Pirtek Park	Louis Matheson
Grand Final
Newcastle Rebels	20 – 4	Monaro Colts	Sunday, 24 March, 2:00pm	Cessnock Sportsground	Louis Matheson

===== Grand Final =====
2024 Men's Country Championships Grand Final

Sunday, 24 March
2:00pm (AEDT)

Newcastle Rebels	20 – 4	Monaro Colts
Tries: Honeti Tuha (5') 1 James Taylor (12') 1 Will Nieuwenhuise (36') 1 Cameron Anderson (72') 1 Goals: Chad O'Donnell 2/4 (14', 74')	1st: 14 – 4; 2nd: 6 – 0	Tries: 1 (20') Brandon Withers; Goals: 0/1 Sam Williams

Cessnock Sportsground, Cessnock
Referee: Louis Matheson
Player of the Match: Cameron Anderson

Team lists:

FB	1	Cameron Anderson
WG	2	Honeti Tuha
CE	3	Matt Soper-Lawler
CE	4	Blake Ferguson
WG	5	Will Nieuwenhuise
FE	6	Chad O'Donnell (c)
HB	19	Will Smith
PR	8	Jayden Butterfield
HK	9	Luke Huth
PR	10	James Taylor
SR	11	Lewis Hamilton
SR	12	Lincoln Smith
LK	13	Ben Stone
Substitutes:
IC	14	Ryan Glanville
IC	15	Jack Welsh
IC	16	Liam Wiscombe
IC	18	Matt Moon
Replacement:
RE	19	Mitch Black
Coach:
Garth Brennan

Officials:

Louis Matheson (Referee)

Jack Fisher (Touch Judge)

Harrison Bayssari (Touch Judge)

FB	1	Jack Davison
WG	2	Brandon Withers
CE	3	Brigham Moeakiola
CE	4	Gideon Afemui
WG	5	Jake Kiely
FE	6	Matthew Woolnough
HB	7	Sam Williams (c)
PR	8	Jesse Martin
HK	9	Liam Oakley
PR	10	Bradley Prior
SR	11	Josh Ayers
SR	12	Jesse Dent
LK	13	Bayley Hitchcock
Substitutes:
IC	15	Jeff Morgan
IC	16	Lachlan Ingram
IC	17	Nick Navarro
IC	18	Thomas Bethke
Replacement:
RE	19	Sonny Tepola
Coach:
Jason Kelly

=== Women's Country Championships ===
The Women's Country Championships is the statewide regional open age women's competition.

==== Teams ====
===== Northern Conference =====
Colours	Club	Home ground(s)	Head coach
	Greater Northern Tigers	Scully Park	TBA
	North Coast Bulldogs	Geoff King Motors Oval	TBA
	Northern Rivers Titans	Frank McGuren Park	TBA

===== Southern Conference =====
Colours	Club	Home ground(s)	Head coach
	Monaro Colts	McLean Oval	TBA
	Riverina Bulls	Laurie Daley Oval, McDonalds Park	TBA
	Western Rams	N/A	TBA

==== Ladders ====
===== Northern Conference =====
Pos	Team	Pld	W	D	L	B	PF	PA	PD	Pts
1	North Coast Bulldogs (W)	2	2	0	0	1	38	12	+26	6
2	Greater Northern Tigers (W)	2	1	0	1	1	26	22	+4	4
3	Northern Rivers Titans (W)	2	0	0	2	1	6	36	–30	2

Updated to match(es) played on 10 March. Source:
Rules for classification: 1) points; 2) point difference; 3) points scored

====== Ladder progression ======
- Numbers highlighted in green indicates the team finished first on the ladder in that round.
- Numbers highlighted in red indicates the team finished last place on the ladder in that round.

Pos	Team	1	2	3
1	North Coast Bulldogs (W)	2	4	6
2	Greater Northern Tigers (W)	2	4	4
3	Northern Rivers Titans (W)	0	0	0

===== Southern Conference =====
Pos	Team	Pld	W	D	L	B	PF	PA	PD	Pts
1	Western Rams (W)	2	2	0	0	1	88	16	+72	6
2	Monaro Colts (W)	2	1	0	1	1	54	20	+34	4
3	Riverina Bulls (W)	2	0	0	2	1	6	112	-106	2

Updated to match(es) played on 10 March. Source:
Rules for classification: 1) points; 2) point difference; 3) points scored

====== Ladder progression ======
- Numbers highlighted in green indicates the team finished first on the ladder in that round.
- Numbers highlighted in red indicates the team finished last place on the ladder in that round.

Pos	Team	1	2	3
1	Western Rams (W)	2	4	6
2	Monaro Colts (W)	2	4	4
3	Riverina Bulls (W)	0	0	0

Season Results:

Round 1

Home	Score	Away	Match Information
Home	Score	Away	Date and Time	Venue	Referee	Video
Northern Rivers Titans (W)	6 – 14	Greater Northern Tigers (W)	Saturday, 24 February, 2:10pm	Frank McGuren Park	Lincoln Close
Riverina Bulls (W)	6 – 68	Western Rams (W)	Sunday, 25 February, 2:00pm	Laurie Daley Oval	Tristan Brooker
North Coast Bulldogs (W)	BYE	Monaro Colts (W)

Round 2

Home	Score	Away	Match Information
Home	Score	Away	Date and Time	Venue	Referee	Video
North Coast Bulldogs (W)	22 – 0	Northern Rivers Titans (W)	Saturday, 2 March, 1:00pm	Rex Hardaker Oval	Lincoln Close
Riverina Bulls (W)	0 – 44	Monaro Colts (W)	Sunday, 3 March, 2:00pm	McDonalds Park	Tristan Brooker
Greater Northern Tigers (W)	BYE	Western Rams (W)

Round 3

Home	Score	Away	Match Information
Home	Score	Away	Date and Time	Venue	Referee	Video
Greater Northern Tigers (W)	12 – 16	North Coast Bulldogs (W)	Saturday, 9 March, 11:50am	Scully Park	Lachlan Gillies
Monaro Colts (W)	10 – 20	Western Rams (W)	Sunday, 10 March, 1:20pm	Les Boyd Oval	Tristan Brooker
Northern Rivers Titans (W)	BYE	Riverina Bulls (W)

==== Finals Series ====
Home	Score	Away	Match Information
Home	Score	Away	Date and Time	Venue	Referee	Video
Grand Final
North Coast Bulldogs (W)	12 – 28	Western Rams (W)	Saturday, 16 March, 2:30pm	Woy Woy Oval	Jake Walsh

===== Grand Final =====
2024 Women's Country Championships Grand Final

Saturday, 16 March
2:30pm (AEDT)

North Coast Bulldogs	12 – 28	Western Rams
Tries: Belinda Anderson (41') 1 Georgia Dent (44') 1 Goals: Tina McRae 2/2 (42', 45')	1st: 0 – 14; 2nd: 12 – 14	Tries: 2 (36', 59') Aliesha Earsman; 1 (3') Xanthe Booth; 1 (17') Emilie Brown; 1 (21') Alahna Ryan; 1 (53') Kiara Sullivan; Goals: 2/6 Sarah Colman (5', 60')

Woy Woy Oval, Woy Woy
Referee: Jake Walsh
Player of the Match: Aliesha Earsman

Team lists:

FB	1	Ava Glassie
WG	2	Natalya Franklin
CE	3	Georgia Dent
CE	4	Tiarna Dunn
WG	5	Annika Franklin
FE	6	Nakita Binge
HB	7
PR	8	Zoie Shreiweis
HK	9	Belinda Anderson (c)
PR	22	Carissa Skrinnikoff
SR	11	Rachel Bradley
SR	12	Natalie Smith
LK	13	Tina McRae
Substitutes:
IC	10	Naomi George
IC	17	Chloe Simiana
IC	18	Kali Taylor
IC	19	Abby Baker
Coach:

Officials:

Jake Walsh (Referee)

Alex Le Geyt (Touch Judge)

Siobhan Wilson (Touch Judge)

FB	1	Tiana Anderson
WG	2	Sophie Tilburg
CE	3	Alahna Ryan
CE	15	Kiara Sullivan
WG	5	Emilie Brown
FE	6	Carly Abbott
HB	7	Sarah Colman
PR	11	Kandy Kennedy
HK	9	Xanthe Booth
PR	10	Aliesha Earsman
SR	14	Danielle Plummer
SR	16	Rebecca Smith (c)
LK	17	Lilly Baker
Substitutes:
IC	12	Lily Stubbs
IC	22	Chelsea Amone
IC	4	Kate Gulliver
IC	19	Charli Robinson
Coach:
Kevin Grimshaw

== Representative Matches ==
=== Country V City ===
2024 Men's Country V City

Saturday, 18 May
2:20pm (AEST)

Country	28 – 30	City
Tries: Honeti Tuha (27', 36', 57') 3 Cameron Anderson (39') 1 James Morgan (53') 1 Joshua Ayers (66') 1 Goals: Chad O'Donnell 2/5 (55', 68'); Jake Brisbane 0/1	1st: 12 – 22; 2nd: 16 – 8	Tries: 2 (5', 20') Craig Garvey; 1 (9') Joshua Finau; 1 (12') Anton Iaria; 1 (49') Jade Anderson; Goals: 5/7 Zac Greene (6', 11', 21', 51', 79'p)

Leichhardt Oval, Sydney
Referee: Luke Saldern
Player of the Match: Craig Garvey

Team lists:

FB	1	Cameron Anderson
WG	2	James Morgan
CE	3	Adam Walker
CE	4	Matthew Soper-Lawler
WG	5	Honeti Tuha
FE	6	Chad O'Donnell (c)
HB	7	Jake Brisbane
PR	8	Jayden Butterfield
HK	9	Luke Huth
PR	10	James Taylor
SR	11	Joshua Ayers
SR	12	Lewis Hamilton
LK	13	Royce Tout
Substitutes:
IC	14	Ryan Glanville
IC	15	Joshua Dowel
IC	16	Ryan Shaw
IC	17	Jake Woods
Replacement:
RE	18	Lachlan Munro
Coach:
Wade Forrester

Officials:

Luke Saldern (Referee)

Brendan Mani (Touch Judge)

Pat Mackey (Touch Judge)

FB	1	Jade Anderson
WG	2	Joshuah Minhinnick
CE	3	Roman Ioelu
CE	4	Tony Satini
WG	5	Christian Crichton
FE	6	Hayden Bonanno
HB	7	Zac Greene (c)
PR	8	Joshua Finau
HK	9	Craig Garvey
PR	10	Ben Seufale
SR	11	Tyler Cassel
SR	12	Anton Iaria
LK	13	Jake Rafferty-Butfield
Substitutes:
IC	14	Anthony Layoun
IC	15	Adam Spicer
IC	16	Trentham Petersen
IC	17	Falefa Letoi
Replacement:
RE	18	Shalom O'ofou
Coach:
Darren Baker
