= 2024 NSWRL Junior Representative Competitions =

The New South Wales Rugby League will administer several Junior Representative Competitions during the 2024 season. This will include two metro male competitions, two metro female competitions, two regional male competitions and one regional female competition.

== Under 19s ==
=== UNE SG Ball Cup ===
The SG Ball Cup is the statewide men's under 19s competition.

==== Teams ====
Colours	Club	Home ground(s)	Head coach
	Balmain Tigers	Leichhardt Oval	TBA
	Canberra Raiders	Raiders Belconnen	TBA
	Canterbury-Bankstown Bulldogs	Terry Lamb Complex, Hammondville Oval	TBA
	Cronulla-Sutherland Sharks	PointsBet Stadium	TBA
	Illawarra Steelers	Collegians Sporting Complex	TBA
	Manly Warringah Sea Eagles	4 Pines Park	TBA
	Melbourne Storm	Seabrook Reserve	TBA
	New Zealand Warriors	Navigation Home Stadium	TBA
	Newcastle Knights	St Johns Oval, Cessnock Sportsground	TBA
	North Sydney Bears	Hills Grammar	TBA
	Parramatta Eels	Eric Tweedale Stadium	TBA
	Penrith Panthers	St Marys Leagues Stadium	TBA
	South Sydney Rabbitohs	Redfern Oval	TBA
	St George Dragons	Netstrada Jubilee Stadium	TBA
	Sydney Roosters	Various	TBA
	Western Suburbs Magpies	Kirkham Oval	TBA

==== Ladder ====
Pos	Team	Pld	W	D	L	B	PF	PA	PD	Pts	Qualification
1	Sydney Roosters (U19s)	9	9	0	0	0	299	152	+147	18	Qualification to Semi-Finals
2	St George Dragons (U19s)	9	7	0	2	0	302	154	+148	14	Qualification to Semi-Finals
3	Newcastle Knights (U19s)	9	7	0	2	0	314	168	+146	14	Qualification to Elimination Finals
4	Canterbury-Bankstown Bulldogs (U19s)	9	6	1	2	0	304	176	+128	13	Qualification to Elimination Finals
5	Parramatta Eels (U19s)	9	6	0	3	0	258	190	+68	12	Qualification to Elimination Finals
6	Illawarra Steelers (U19s)	9	6	0	3	0	238	182	+56	12	Qualification to Elimination Finals
7	Western Suburbs Magpies (U19s)	9	4	1	4	0	248	226	+22	9	
8	Penrith Panthers (U19s)	9	4	1	4	0	216	194	+22	9	
9	Cronulla-Sutherland Sharks (U19s)	9	4	1	4	0	256	244	+12	9	
10	South Sydney Rabbitohs (U19s)	9	4	0	5	0	214	236	–22	8	
11	Canberra Raiders (U19s)	9	4	0	5	0	206	268	–62	8	
12	New Zealand Warriors (U19s)	9	3	1	5	0	234	230	+4	7	
13	Melbourne Storm (U19s)	9	2	1	6	0	160	246	–86	5	
14	Manly Warringah Sea Eagles (U19s)	9	2	0	7	0	156	276	-120	4	
15	North Sydney Bears (U19s)	9	1	0	8	0	118	364	-246	2	
16	Balmain Tigers (U19s)	9	0	0	9	0	94	311	-217	0	

Updated to match(es) played on 31 March. Source:
Rules for classification: 1) points; 2) point difference; 3) points scored

===== Ladder progression =====
- Numbers highlighted in green indicate that the team finished the round in an elimination final position.
- Numbers highlighted in blue indicates the team finished the round in a semi-final position.
- Numbers highlighted in red indicates the team finished last place on the ladder in that round.

Pos	Team	1	2	3	4	5	6	7	8	9
1	Sydney Roosters (U19s)	2	4	6	8	10	12	14	16	18
2	St George Dragons (U19s)	2	4	6	6	8	8	10	12	14
3	Newcastle Knights (U19s)	2	2	4	6	8	10	10	12	14
4	Canterbury-Bankstown Bulldogs (U19s)	0	2	3	3	5	7	9	11	13
5	Parramatta Eels (U19s)	2	4	6	6	6	6	8	10	12
6	Illawarra Steelers (U19s)	2	4	6	8	8	10	10	10	12
7	Western Suburbs Magpies (U19s)	2	3	3	5	7	9	9	9	9
8	Penrith Panthers (U19s)	0	2	3	3	5	5	5	7	9
9	Cronulla-Sutherland Sharks (U19s)	2	2	2	4	6	6	8	9	9
10	South Sydney Rabbitohs (U19s)	0	0	2	2	2	4	6	6	8
11	Canberra Raiders (U19s)	0	0	2	4	4	6	8	8	8
12	New Zealand Warriors (U19s)	0	2	2	4	6	6	6	7	7
13	Melbourne Storm (U19s)	2	3	3	5	5	5	5	5	5
14	Manly Warringah Sea Eagles (U19s)	0	0	0	0	0	2	2	4	4
15	North Sydney Bears (U19s)	0	0	0	0	0	0	2	2	2
16	Balmain Tigers (U19s)	0	0	0	0	0	0	0	0	0

Season Results:

Round 1

Home	Score	Away	Match Information
Home	Score	Away	Date and Time	Venue	Referee	Video
Manly Warringah Sea Eagles (U19s)	18 – 42	Western Suburbs Magpies (U19s)	Saturday, 3 February, 12:00pm	4 Pines Park	Jayden Kastelan
Canberra Raiders (U19s)	10 – 56	Newcastle Knights (U19s)	Saturday, 3 February, 12:30pm	Raiders Belconnen	Gage Miles
North Sydney Bears (U19s)	16 – 32	Melbourne Storm (U19s)	Saturday, 3 February, 2:15pm	Hills Grammar	Isaac El-Hassan
Penrith Panthers (U19s)	24 – 26	St George Dragons (U19s)	Saturday, 3 February, 2:30pm	BlueBet Stadium	Ryan Micallef
Canterbury-Bankstown Bulldogs (U19s)	24 – 36	Sydney Roosters (U19s)	Saturday, 3 February, 2:30pm	Belmore Sports Ground	Mitchell Pitscheider
Illawarra Steelers (U19s)	26 – 12	South Sydney Rabbitohs (U19s)	Saturday, 3 February, 3:00pm	Collegians Sporting Complex	William Damato
Cronulla-Sutherland Sharks (U19s)	44 – 18	Balmain Tigers (U19s)	Saturday, 3 February, 3:15pm	PointsBet Stadium	Harrison Bayssari
Parramatta Eels (U19s)	32 – 20	New Zealand Warriors (U19s)	Sunday, 4 February, 11:30am	Eric Tweedale Stadium	Jabril Daizli

Round 2

Home	Score	Away	Match Information
Home	Score	Away	Date and Time	Venue	Referee	Video
St George Dragons (U19s)	42 – 10	Manly Warringah Sea Eagles (U19s)	Saturday, 10 February, 11:30am	Netstrada Jubilee Stadium	Isaac El-Hassan
Penrith Panthers (U19s)	28 – 10	South Sydney Rabbitohs (U19s)	Saturday, 10 February, 1:00pm	Windsor Sports Complex	Harrison Bayssari
Canberra Raiders (U19s)	18 – 42	Illawarra Steelers (U19s)	Saturday, 10 February, 1:30pm	Raiders Belconnen	Ryan Micallef
Cronulla-Sutherland Sharks (U19s)	18 – 28	Parramatta Eels (U19s)	Saturday, 10 February, 2:15pm	PointsBet Stadium	Mitchell Pitscheider
Melbourne Storm (U19s)	24 – 24	Western Suburbs Magpies (U19s)	Saturday, 10 February, 2:30pm	Seabrook Reserve	Johnathan Nicholls
Balmain Tigers (U19s)	12 – 13	Sydney Roosters (U19s)	Saturday, 10 February, 2:30pm	Leichhardt Oval	Gage Miles
Canterbury-Bankstown Bulldogs (U19s)	28 – 26	Newcastle Knights (U19s)	Saturday, 10 February, 3:15pm	Cessnock Sportsground	Jabril Daizli
New Zealand Warriors (U19s)	48 – 12	North Sydney Bears (U19s)	Sunday, 11 February, 9:00am	Navigation Home Stadium	Joseph Green

Round 3

Home	Score	Away	Match Information
Home	Score	Away	Date and Time	Venue	Referee	Video
Parramatta Eels (U19s)	38 – 12	Balmain Tigers (U19s)	Saturday, 17 February, 10:00am	Eric Tweedale Stadium	William Damato
Penrith Panthers (U19s)	22 – 22	Canterbury-Bankstown Bulldogs (U19s)	Saturday, 17 February, 11:30am	Windsor Sports Complex	Mitchell Pitscheider
South Sydney Rabbitohs (U19s)	26 – 22	Manly Warringah Sea Eagles (U19s)	Saturday, 17 February, 1:00pm	Redfern Oval	Bailey Warren
Illawarra Steelers (U19s)	34 – 12	Melbourne Storm (U19s)	Saturday, 17 February, 2:00pm	Collegians Sporting Complex	Gage Miles
North Sydney Bears (U19s)	10 – 60	St George Dragons (U19s)	Saturday, 17 February, 2:15pm	Hills Grammar	Isaac El-Hassan
Cronulla-Sutherland Sharks (U19s)	18 – 34	Canberra Raiders (U19s)	Saturday, 17 February, 3:15pm	PointsBet Stadium	Ryan Micallef
Newcastle Knights (U19s)	36 – 26	Western Suburbs Magpies (U19s)	Saturday, 17 February, 3:30pm	St John Oval	Curtis Robinson
Sydney Roosters (U19s)	32 – 16	New Zealand Warriors (U19s)	Sunday, 18 February, 12:00pm	Morry Breen Oval	Harrison Bayssari

Round 4

Home	Score	Away	Match Information
Home	Score	Away	Date and Time	Venue	Referee	Video
Newcastle Knights (U19s)	16 – 14	St George Dragons (U19s)	Saturday, 24 February, 12:50pm	Newcastle Centre of Excellence	Mitchell Pitscheider
Sydney Roosters (U19s)	22 – 16	Penrith Panthers (U19s)	Saturday, 24 February, 2:00pm	Henson Park	Curtis Robinson
Balmain Tigers (U19s)	10 – 28	Melbourne Storm (U19s)	Saturday, 24 February, 2:30pm	Leichhardt Oval	Isaac El-Hassan
Illawarra Steelers (U19s)	30 – 16	Parramatta Eels (U19s)	Saturday, 24 February, 3:00pm	WIN Stadium	Ryan Micallef
Manly Warringah Sea Eagles (U19s)	20 – 28	Cronulla-Sutherland Sharks (U19s)	Saturday, 24 February, 3:45pm	4 Pines Park	Harrison Bayssari
North Sydney Bears (U19s)	6 – 48	Western Suburbs Magpies (U19s)	Sunday, 25 February, 11:00am	Hills Grammar	Bailey Warren
South Sydney Rabbitohs (U19s)	14 – 44	New Zealand Warriors (U19s)	Sunday, 25 February, 11:30am	Redfern Oval	William Damato
Canberra Raiders (U19s)	30 – 20	Canterbury-Bankstown Bulldogs (U19s)	Sunday, 25 February, 12:45pm	Seiffert Oval	Gage Miles

Round 5

Home	Score	Away	Match Information
Home	Score	Away	Date and Time	Venue	Referee	Video
Penrith Panthers (U19s)	24 – 16	Illawarra Steelers (U19s)	Friday, 1 March, 8:00pm	Windsor Sports Complex	Liam Richardson
Cronulla-Sutherland Sharks (U19s)	52 – 14	South Sydney Rabbitohs (U19s)	Saturday, 2 March, 2:15pm	PointsBet Stadium	William Damato
North Sydney Bears (U19s)	16 – 48	Sydney Roosters (U19s)	Saturday, 2 March, 2:15pm	Hills Grammar	Bailey Warren
Parramatta Eels (U19s)	16 – 32	Canterbury-Bankstown Bulldogs (U19s)	Saturday, 2 March, 2:30pm	Eric Tweedale Stadium	Isaac El-Hassan
Western Suburbs Magpies (U19s)	20 – 18	Canberra Raiders (U19s)	Saturday, 2 March, 2:30pm	Kirkham Oval	Curtis Robinson
Melbourne Storm (U19s)	10 – 24	St George Dragons (U19s)	Saturday, 2 March, 2:30pm	Seabrook Reserve	Matt Hicks
Newcastle Knights (U19s)	54 – 14	Manly Warringah Sea Eagles (U19s)	Saturday, 2 March, 3:00pm	Kurri Kurri Sportsground	Harrison Bayssari
New Zealand Warriors (U19s)	20 – 6	Balmain Tigers (U19s)	Sunday, 3 March, 11:45am	Navigation Home Stadium	Viggo Rasmussen

Round 6

Home	Score	Away	Match Information
Home	Score	Away	Date and Time	Venue	Referee	Video
Canterbury-Bankstown Bulldogs (U19s)	50 – 18	Cronulla-Sutherland Sharks (U19s)	Saturday, 9 March, 11:30am	Terry Lamb Complex	Gage Miles
Western Suburbs Magpies (U19s)	40 – 10	Balmain Tigers (U19s)	Saturday, 9 March, 12:30pm	Lidcombe Oval	Curtis Robinson
Newcastle Knights (U19s)	20 – 16	Parramatta Eels (U19s)	Saturday, 9 March, 1:50pm	St John Oval	Mitchell Pitscheider
South Sydney Rabbitohs (U19s)	38 – 6	North Sydney Bears (U19s)	Saturday, 9 March, 2:00pm	Redfern Oval	Isaac El-Hassan
Melbourne Storm (U19s)	6 – 20	Manly Warringah Sea Eagles (U19s)	Saturday, 9 March, 2:30pm	Seabrook Reserve	Mohammad Hussaini
Canberra Raiders (U19s)	44 – 4	Penrith Panthers (U19s)	Saturday, 9 March, 3:00pm	Raiders Belconnen	William Damato
Sydney Roosters (U19s)	46 – 10	St George Dragons (U19s)	Saturday, 9 March, 3:00pm	Woy Woy Oval	Ryan Micallef
New Zealand Warriors (U19s)	24 – 32	Illawarra Steelers (U19s)	Sunday, 10 March, 11:45am	Navigation Home Stadium	Joseph Green

Round 7

Home	Score	Away	Match Information
Home	Score	Away	Date and Time	Venue	Referee	Video
Western Suburbs Magpies (U19s)	6 – 42	South Sydney Rabbitohs (U19s)	Saturday, 16 March, 11:30am	Kirkham Oval	William Damato
Penrith Panthers (U19s)	22 – 28	Cronulla-Sutherland Sharks (U19s)	Saturday, 16 March, 1:30pm	St Marys Leagues Stadium	Ryan Micallef
Canterbury-Bankstown Bulldogs (U19s)	42 – 6	Balmain Tigers (U19s)	Saturday, 16 March, 2:15pm	Terry Lamb Complex	Isaac El-Hassan
Manly Warringah Sea Eagles (U19s)	16 – 24	North Sydney Bears (U19s)	Saturday, 16 March, 2:30pm	HE Laybutt Field	Curtis Robinson
Melbourne Storm (U19s)	16 – 46	Parramatta Eels (U19s)	Saturday, 16 March, 2:30pm	Goschs Paddock	Matt Hicks
Sydney Roosters (U19s)	32 – 22	Newcastle Knights (U19s)	Saturday, 16 March, 3:00pm	Mascot Oval	Mitchell Pitscheider
St George Dragons (U19s)	18 – 4	Illawarra Steelers (U19s)	Saturday, 16 March, 3:30pm	Netstrada Jubilee Stadium	Gage Miles
New Zealand Warriors (U19s)	14 – 18	Canberra Raiders (U19s)	Sunday, 17 March, 10:45am	Navigation Home Stadium	Joseph Green

Round 8

Home	Score	Away	Match Information
Home	Score	Away	Date and Time	Venue	Referee	Video
Newcastle Knights (U19s)	34 – 18	South Sydney Rabbitohs (U19s)	Saturday, 23 March, 12:50pm	Cessnock Sportsground	Mitchell Pitscheider
Penrith Panthers (U19s)	32 – 26	Melbourne Storm (U19s)	Saturday, 23 March, 2:00pm	St Marys Leagues Stadium	Ryan Micallef
Western Suburbs Magpies (U19s)	16 – 42	Sydney Roosters (U19s)	Saturday, 23 March, 2:30pm	Kirkham Oval	Gage Miles
Parramatta Eels (U19s)	36 – 16	North Sydney Bears (U19s)	Saturday, 23 March, 3:00pm	Eric Tweedale Stadium	Isaac El-Hassan
Balmain Tigers (U19s)	10 – 36	Manly Warringah Sea Eagles (U19s)	Saturday, 23 March, 5:10pm	Leichhardt Oval	William Damato
New Zealand Warriors (U19s)	30 – 30	Cronulla-Sutherland Sharks (U19s)	Sunday, 24 March, 1:00pm	Navigation Home Stadium	Viggo Rasmussen
Canterbury-Bankstown Bulldogs (U19s)	46 – 16	Illawarra Steelers (U19s)	Sunday, 24 March, 1:00pm	Hammondville Oval	Lukas Durrant
St George Dragons (U19s)	54 – 16	Canberra Raiders (U19s)	Sunday, 24 March, 2:30pm	Forshaw Park	Curtis Robinson

Round 9

Home	Score	Away	Match Information
Home	Score	Away	Date and Time	Venue	Referee	Video
South Sydney Rabbitohs (U19s)	40 – 18	Canberra Raiders (U19s)	Friday, 29 March, 12:30pm	Redfern Oval	Isaac El-Hassan
Parramatta Eels (U19s)	30 – 26	Western Suburbs Magpies (U19s)	Friday, 29 March, 12:40pm	Eric Tweedale Stadium	Ryan Micallef
Melbourne Storm (U19s)	6 – 40	Canterbury-Bankstown Bulldogs (U19s)	Saturday, 30 March, 2:30pm	Seabrook Reserve	Johnathan Nicholls
Balmain Tigers (U19s)	10 – 50	Newcastle Knights (U19s)	Saturday, 30 March, 2:30pm	Leichhardt Oval	Curtis Robinson
Manly Warringah Sea Eagles (U19s)	0 – 44	Penrith Panthers (U19s)	Saturday, 30 March, 3:00pm	4 Pines Park	Mitchell Pitscheider
Illawarra Steelers (U19s)	38 – 12	North Sydney Bears (U19s)	Saturday, 30 March, 3:00pm	Collegians Sporting Complex	William Damato
Cronulla-Sutherland Sharks (U19s)	20 – 28	Sydney Roosters (U19s)	Saturday, 30 March, 3:15pm	PointsBet Stadium	Gage Miles
New Zealand Warriors (U19s)	18 – 54	St George Dragons (U19s)	Sunday, 31 March, 11:45am	Navigation Home Stadium	Viggo Rasmussen

==== Finals Series ====
Elimination Finals
4	Canterbury-Bankstown	42
5	Parramatta	10
3	Newcastle	44
6	Illawarra	16

Semi-Finals
1	Sydney	22
4	Canterbury-Bankstown	28
2	St George	36
3	Newcastle	4

Grand Final
2	St George	40
4	Canterbury-Bankstown	18

Home	Score	Away	Match Information
Home	Score	Away	Date and Time	Venue	Referee	Video
Elimination Finals
Newcastle Knights (U19s)	44 – 16	Illawarra Steelers (U19s)	Saturday, 13 April, 4:45pm	Leichhardt Oval	Gage Miles
Canterbury-Bankstown Bulldogs (U19s)	42 – 10	Parramatta Eels (U19s)	Sunday, 14 April, 11:30am	Leichhardt Oval	Mitchell Pitscheider
Semi-Finals
Sydney Roosters (U19s)	22 – 28	Canterbury-Bankstown Bulldogs (U19s)	Saturday, 20 April, 12:30pm	Henson Park	Gage Miles
St George Dragons (U19s)	36 – 4	Newcastle Knights (U19s)	Saturday, 20 April, 6:30pm	Leichhardt Oval	Mitchell Pitscheider
Grand Final
St George Dragons (U19s)	40 – 18	Canterbury-Bankstown Bulldogs (U19s)	Saturday, 27 April, 3:15pm	CommBank Stadium	Mitchell Pitscheider

===== Grand Final =====
2024 SG Ball Cup Grand Final

Saturday, 27 April
3:15pm (AEST)

St George Dragons	40 – 18	Canterbury-Bankstown Bulldogs
Tries: Jesse Williams (18', 27') 2 Zachariah Nachar (6', 43') 2 Ryan Hutchison (9') 1 Corey Ackers (30') 1 Lyric Craft-Te Moananui (38') 1 David Afu (54') 1 Goals: Shadi Hammoud 4/8 (10', 20', 32', 40')	1st: 26 – 4; 2nd: 14 – 12; NSWRL; Dragons	Tries: 1 (2') Hamish Wilson; 1 (48') Ratu Rinakama; 1 (60') Sosaia Alatini; 1 (70') Sosaia Kaufusi; Goals: 1/4 Alex Conti (60')

CommBank Stadium, Sydney
Referee: Mitchell Pitscheider
Player of the Match: Jacob Halangahu

Team lists:

FB	1	Tyler Peckham-Harris
WG	2	Zachariah Nachar
CE	3	David Afu
CE	4	Lyric Craft-Te Moananui
WG	5	Jesse Williams
FE	6	Shadi Hammoud (c)
HB	7	Brandon Tikinau
PR	8	Ryan Hutchison
HK	9	Isaiah Fagalilo
PR	10	Loko Jnr Pasifiki Tonga
SR	11	Jacob Halangahu
SR	12	Cyrus Stanley-Traill
LK	13	Finau Latu
Substitutes:
IC	14	Angus Clark
IC	15	Corey Ackers
IC	16	Viliami Hikila
IC	17	Risiate Smythe
Replacement:
RE	18	Benjamin Geary
Coach:

Officials:

Mitchell Pitscheider (Referee)

Nathan Hillier (Touch Judge)

Harrison Bayssari (Touch Judge)

William Damato (In Goal Judge)

Lukas Durrant (In Goal Judge)

FB	1	Roy Tatupa
WG	2	Hamish Wilson
CE	3	Shaye Fa'aoga
CE	4	Sosaia Kaufusi
WG	5	Ratu Rinakama
FE	6	Alex Conti
HB	7	Mitchell Woods (c)
PR	8	Fanafou Seve
HK	9	Mitchell Rogers
PR	10	Oliva Smith
SR	11	Logan Spinks
SR	12	Sosaia Alatini
LK	13	Bud Smith
Substitutes:
IC	14	Patrick Young
IC	15	Sione Siulua
IC	16	Sosefo Finau
IC	17	David Leota
Replacement:
RE	19	Latrell Fing
Coach:

==== Player of the Series ====
Mitchell Woods (Canterbury Bankstown Bulldogs) was named Player of the Series.

=== Westpac Tarsha Gale Cup ===
The Tarsha Gale Cup is the statewide women's under 19s competition.

==== Teams ====
Colours	Club	Home ground(s)	Head coach
	Canberra Raiders	Raiders Belconnen	TBA
	Canterbury-Bankstown Bulldogs	Terry Lamb Complex, Hammondville Oval	TBA
	Cronulla-Sutherland Sharks	PointsBet Stadium	TBA
	Illawarra Steelers	Collegians Sporting Complex	TBA
	Manly Warringah Sea Eagles	4 Pines Park	TBA
	Newcastle Knights	St Johns Oval, Cessnock Sportsground	TBA
	North Sydney Bears	Hills Grammar	TBA
	Parramatta Eels	Eric Tweedale Stadium	TBA
	Penrith Panthers	St Marys Leagues Stadium	TBA
	South Sydney Rabbitohs	Redfern Oval	TBA
	St George Dragons	Netstrada Jubilee Stadium	TBA
	Sydney Roosters Indigenous Academy	Henson Park	TBA
	Wests Tigers	Leichhardt Oval, Kirkham Oval	TBA

==== Ladder ====
Pos	Team	Pld	W	D	L	B	PF	PA	PD	Pts	Qualification
1	Illawarra Steelers (U19s W)	8	8	0	0	1	344	28	+316	18	Qualification to Semi-Finals
2	Canterbury-Bankstown Bulldogs (U19s W)	8	7	0	1	1	298	50	+248	16	Qualification to Semi-Finals
3	Sydney Roosters Indigenous Academy (U19s W)	8	7	0	1	1	288	76	+212	16	Qualification to Elimination Finals
4	Manly Warringah Sea Eagles (U19s W)	8	5	2	1	1	268	96	+172	14	Qualification to Elimination Finals
5	Newcastle Knights (U19s W)	8	5	1	2	1	202	98	+104	13	Qualification to Elimination Finals
6	Cronulla-Sutherland Sharks (U19s W)	8	4	1	3	1	174	148	+26	11	Qualification to Elimination Finals
7	Canberra Raiders (U19s W)	8	4	0	4	1	182	134	+48	10	
8	Parramatta Eels (U19s W)	8	4	0	4	1	166	142	+24	10	
9	Wests Tigers (U19s W)	8	3	0	5	1	100	232	-132	8	
10	Penrith Panthers (U19s W)	8	2	0	6	1	88	308	-220	6	
11	South Sydney Rabbitohs (U19s W)	8	1	0	7	1	82	276	-194	4	
12	North Sydney Bears (U19s W)	8	0	0	8	1	50	264	-214	2	
13	St George Dragons (U19s W)	8	0	0	8	1	14	404	-390	2	

Updated to match(es) played on 31 March. Source:
Rules for classification: 1) points; 2) point difference; 3) points scored

===== Ladder progression =====
- Numbers highlighted in green indicate that the team finished the round in an elimination final position.
- Numbers highlighted in blue indicates the team finished the round in a semi-final position.
- Numbers highlighted in red indicates the team finished last place on the ladder in that round.
- Underlined numbers indicate that the team had a bye during that round.

Pos	Team	1	2	3	4	5	6	7	8	9
1	Illawarra Steelers (U19s W)	2	4	6	8	10	12	14	16	18
2	Canterbury-Bankstown Bulldogs (U19s W)	2	4	6	8	10	10	12	14	16
3	Sydney Roosters Indigenous Academy (U19s W)	2	4	6	8	8	10	12	14	16
4	Manly Warringah Sea Eagles (U19s W)	2	4	6	7	8	10	12	12	14
5	Newcastle Knights (U19s W)	2	2	4	6	7	9	9	11	13
6	Cronulla-Sutherland Sharks (U19s W)	2	4	4	5	7	9	11	11	11
7	Canberra Raiders (U19s W)	0	0	2	4	4	6	6	8	10
8	Parramatta Eels (U19s W)	0	0	2	2	4	4	6	8	10
9	Wests Tigers (U19s W)	0	0	0	2	4	6	6	8	8
10	Penrith Panthers (U19s W)	2	4	4	4	6	6	6	6	6
11	South Sydney Rabbitohs (U19s W)	0	0	0	0	0	2	4	4	4
12	North Sydney Bears (U19s W)	0	2	2	2	2	2	2	2	2
13	St George Dragons (U19s W)	0	0	0	2	2	2	2	2	2

Season Results:

Round 1

Home	Score	Away	Match Information
Home	Score	Away	Date and Time	Venue	Referee	Video
Canterbury-Bankstown Bulldogs (U19s W)	32 – 4	Parramatta Eels (U19s W)	Saturday, 3 February, 11:30am	Belmore Sports Ground	Ruby Keen
North Sydney Bears (U19s W)	4 – 38	Sydney Roosters Indigenous Academy (U19s W)	Saturday, 3 February, 11:45am	Hills Grammar	Rami Abu-Mansour
Cronulla-Sutherland Sharks (U19s W)	22 – 18	Wests Tigers (U19s W)	Saturday, 3 February, 11:45am	PointsBet Stadium	Nelson Pantelis
Illawarra Steelers (U19s W)	30 – 12	South Sydney Rabbitohs (U19s W)	Saturday, 3 February, 12:00pm	Collegians Sporting Complex	Aidan Richardson
Penrith Panthers (U19s W)	40 – 0	St George Dragons (U19s W)	Saturday, 3 February, 1:00pm	BlueBet Stadium	Reece Sammut
Canberra Raiders (U19s W)	10 – 16	Newcastle Knights (U19s W)	Saturday, 3 February, 2:00pm	Raiders Belconnen	Josh Williamson
Manly Warringah Sea Eagles (U19s W)		BYE

Round 2

Home	Score	Away	Match Information
Home	Score	Away	Date and Time	Venue	Referee	Video
Cronulla-Sutherland Sharks (U19s W)	22 – 6	Parramatta Eels (U19s W)	Saturday, 10 February, 10:45am	PointsBet Stadium	Tallon Irons
Wests Tigers (U19s W)	0 – 60	Sydney Roosters Indigenous Academy (U19s W)	Saturday, 10 February, 11:30am	Leichhardt Oval	Ruby Keen
Canberra Raiders (U19s W)	6 – 36	Illawarra Steelers (U19s W)	Saturday, 10 February, 12:00pm	Raiders Belconnen	Nelson Pantelis
St George Dragons (U19s W)	0 – 52	Manly Warringah Sea Eagles (U19s W)	Saturday, 10 February, 2:30pm	Netstrada Jubilee Stadium	Reece Sammut
Canterbury-Bankstown Bulldogs (U19s W)	12 – 6	Newcastle Knights (U19s W)	Saturday, 10 February, 3:00pm	Hammondville Oval	Aidan Richardson
South Sydney Rabbitohs (U19s W)	4 – 32	Penrith Panthers (U19s W)	Sunday, 11 February, 2:00pm	Industree Group Stadium	Alex Le-Geyt
North Sydney Bears (U19s W)		BYE

Round 3

Home	Score	Away	Match Information
Home	Score	Away	Date and Time	Venue	Referee	Video
Sydney Roosters Indigenous Academy (U19s W)	62 – 0	St George Dragons (U19s W)	Saturday, 17 February, 11:30am	Henson Park	Jesse McQuire
Penrith Panthers (U19s W)	4 – 72	Canterbury-Bankstown Bulldogs (U19s W)	Saturday, 17 February, 11:30am	Federation Forest Reserve	James Fitzgerald
Cronulla-Sutherland Sharks (U19s W)	10 – 16	Canberra Raiders (U19s W)	Saturday, 17 February, 11:45am	PointsBet Stadium	Olivia Lawne
North Sydney Bears (U19s W)	0 – 50	Illawarra Steelers (U19s W)	Saturday, 17 February, 11:45am	Hills Grammar	Reece Sammut
Newcastle Knights (U19s W)	24 – 4	Wests Tigers (U19s W)	Saturday, 17 February, 12:50pm	St John Oval	Callum Richardson
South Sydney Rabbitohs (U19s W)	6 – 52	Manly Warringah Sea Eagles (U19s W)	Sunday, 18 February, 2:30pm	Mascot Oval	Tallon Irons
Parramatta Eels (U19s W)		BYE

Round 4

Home	Score	Away	Match Information
Home	Score	Away	Date and Time	Venue	Referee	Video
Sydney Roosters Indigenous Academy (U19s W)	58 – 0	Penrith Panthers (U19s W)	Saturday, 24 February, 11:00am	Henson Park	Callum Richardson
Wests Tigers (U19s W)	24 – 10	North Sydney Bears (U19s W)	Saturday, 24 February, 11:30am	Leichhardt Oval	James Fitzgerald
Illawarra Steelers (U19s W)	38 – 0	Parramatta Eels (U19s W)	Saturday, 24 February, 12:00pm	WIN Stadium	Will Flint
Manly Warringah Sea Eagles (U19s W)	18 – 18	Cronulla-Sutherland Sharks (U19s W)	Sunday, 25 February, 12:30pm	4 Pines Park	Tallon Irons
South Sydney Rabbitohs (U19s W)	12 – 32	Canterbury-Bankstown Bulldogs (U19s W)	Sunday, 25 February, 3:00pm	Redfern Oval	Rami Abu-Mansour
St George Dragons (U19s W)	BYE	Newcastle Knights (U19s W)
Canberra Raiders (U19s W)	BYE

Round 5

Home	Score	Away	Match Information
Home	Score	Away	Date and Time	Venue	Referee	Video
Cronulla-Sutherland Sharks (U19s W)	36 – 12	South Sydney Rabbitohs (U19s W)	Saturday, 2 March, 10:45am	PointsBet Stadium	Jesse McQuire
Parramatta Eels (U19s W)	36 – 0	St George Dragons (U19s W)	Saturday, 2 March, 11:30am	Eric Tweedale Stadium	Harrison Buxton
Wests Tigers (U19s W)	18 – 12	Canberra Raiders (U19s W)	Saturday, 2 March, 11:30am	Kirkham Oval	Nelson Pantelis
North Sydney Bears (U19s W)	0 – 38	Canterbury-Bankstown Bulldogs (U19s W)	Saturday, 2 March, 11:45am	Hills Grammar	Olivia Lawne
Illawarra Steelers (U19s W)	28 – 6	Sydney Roosters Indigenous Academy (U19s W)	Saturday, 2 March, 12:00pm	Sid Parrish Park	Will Flint
Newcastle Knights (U19s W)	24 – 24	Manly Warringah Sea Eagles (U19s W)	Saturday, 2 March, 1:40pm	Kurri Kurri Sportsground	Callum Richardson
Penrith Panthers (U19s W)		BYE

Round 6

Home	Score	Away	Match Information
Home	Score	Away	Date and Time	Venue	Referee	Video
South Sydney Rabbitohs (U19s W)	22 – 8	North Sydney Bears (U19s W)	Saturday, 9 March, 11:00am	Redfern Oval	Brodie Rushby
Sydney Roosters Indigenous Academy (U19s W)	26 – 10	Parramatta Eels (U19s W)	Saturday, 9 March, 11:30am	Eric Tweedale Stadium	Salvatore Marigliano
Canberra Raiders (U19s W)	32 – 8	Penrith Panthers (U19s W)	Saturday, 9 March, 12:00pm	Raiders Belconnen	Balunn Simon
Newcastle Knights (U19s W)	54 – 4	St George Dragons (U19s W)	Saturday, 9 March, 12:30pm	St Johns Oval	Matthew Gomes
Canterbury-Bankstown Bulldogs (U19s W)	18 – 20	Manly Warringah Sea Eagles (U19s W)	Saturday, 9 March, 2:30pm	Terry Lamb Complex	Rhianna Boag
Cronulla-Sutherland Sharks (U19s W)	BYE	Illawarra Steelers (U19s W)
Wests Tigers (U19s W)	BYE

Round 7

Home	Score	Away	Match Information
Home	Score	Away	Date and Time	Venue	Referee	Video
Manly Warringah Sea Eagles (U19s W)	24 – 10	North Sydney Bears (U19s W)	Saturday, 16 March, 11:30am	HE Laybutt Field	Harrison Buxton
Penrith Panthers (U19s W)	4 – 48	Cronulla-Sutherland Sharks (U19s W)	Saturday, 16 March, 12:00pm	St Marys Leagues Stadium	Tallon Irons
Sydney Roosters Indigenous Academy (U19s W)	24 – 22	Newcastle Knights (U19s W)	Saturday, 16 March, 12:00pm	Mascot Oval	Jesse McQuire
Parramatta Eels (U19s W)	30 – 12	Canberra Raiders (U19s W)	Saturday, 16 March, 12:30pm	Eric Tweedale Stadium	Nelson Pantelis
St George Dragons (U19s W)	0 – 62	Illawarra Steelers (U19s W)	Saturday, 16 March, 2:00pm	Netstrada Jubilee Stadium	Matthew Gomes
Canterbury-Bankstown Bulldogs (U19s W)	30 – 4	Wests Tigers (U19s W)	Saturday, 16 March, 2:30pm	Kirkham Oval	Aden Hayward
South Sydney Rabbitohs (U19s W)		BYE

Round 8

Home	Score	Away	Match Information
Home	Score	Away	Date and Time	Venue	Referee	Video
Parramatta Eels (U19s W)	48 – 12	North Sydney Bears (U19s W)	Saturday, 23 March, 11:30am	Eric Tweedale Stadium	Harrison Buxton
Wests Tigers (U19s W)	26 – 8	South Sydney Rabbitohs (U19s W)	Saturday, 23 March, 11:30am	Kirkham Oval	Matthew Gomes
Penrith Panthers (U19s W)	0 – 62	Illawarra Steelers (U19s W)	Saturday, 23 March, 12:30pm	St Marys Leagues Stadium	Nelson Pantelis
Newcastle Knights (U19s W)	36 – 14	Cronulla-Sutherland Sharks (U19s W)	Saturday, 23 March, 2:10pm	Cessnock Sportsground	Callum Richardson
Manly Warringah Sea Eagles (U19s W)	12 – 14	Sydney Roosters Indigenous Academy (U19s W)	Saturday, 23 March, 4:00pm	4 Pines Park	Jesse McQuire
St George Dragons (U19s W)	10 – 34	Canberra Raiders (U19s W)	Sunday, 24 March, 11:30am	Forshaw Park	Ben Raymond
Canterbury-Bankstown Bulldogs (U19s W)		BYE

Round 9

Home	Score	Away	Match Information
Home	Score	Away	Date and Time	Venue	Referee	Video
Parramatta Eels (U19s W)	32 – 0	Penrith Panthers (U19s W)	Thursday, 28 March, 7:40pm	Eric Tweedale Stadium	Harrison Buxton
Manly Warringah Sea Eagles (U19s W)	66 – 6	Wests Tigers (U19s W)	Saturday, 30 March, 12:00pm	4 Pines Park	Callum Richardson
Illawarra Steelers (U19s W)	38 – 4	Cronulla-Sutherland Sharks (U19s W)	Saturday, 30 March, 12:00pm	Collegians Sporting Complex	Ben Raymond
North Sydney Bears (U19s W)	6 – 20	Newcastle Knights (U19s W)	Saturday, 30 March, 12:15pm	NSWRL Centre of Excellence	Matthew Gomes
Canberra Raiders (U19s W)	60 – 6	South Sydney Rabbitohs (U19s W)	Saturday, 30 March, 1:30pm	Seiffert Oval	Callum Rigby
St George Dragons (U19s W)	0 – 64	Canterbury-Bankstown Bulldogs (U19s W)	Saturday, 30 March, 2:30pm	Netstrada Jubilee Stadium	Jesse McQuire
Sydney Roosters Indigenous Academy (U19s W)		BYE

==== Finals Series ====
Elimination Finals
3	Sydney	6
6	Cronulla-Sutherland	24
4	Manly Warringah	16
5	Newcastle	18

Semi-Finals
1	Illawarra	26
6	Cronulla-Sutherland	4
2	Canterbury-Bankstown	0
5	Newcastle	28

Grand Final
1	Illawarra	24
5	Newcastle	12

Home	Score	Away	Match Information
Home	Score	Away	Date and Time	Venue	Referee	Video
Elimination Finals
Manly Warringah Sea Eagles (U19s W)	16 – 18	Newcastle Knights (U19s W)	Saturday, 13 April, 3:00pm	Leichhardt Oval	Curtis Robinson
Sydney Roosters Indigenous Academy (U19s W)	6 – 24	Cronulla-Sutherland Sharks (U19s W)	Sunday, 14 April, 2:45pm	Leichhardt Oval	William Damato
Semi-Finals
Illawarra Steelers (U19s W)	26 – 4	Cronulla-Sutherland Sharks (U19s W)	Saturday, 20 April, 2:00pm	Leichhardt Oval	Curtis Robinson
Canterbury-Bankstown Bulldogs (U19s W)	0 – 28	Newcastle Knights (U19s W)	Saturday, 20 April, 5:00pm	Leichhardt Oval	William Damato
Grand Final
Illawarra Steelers (U19s W)	24 – 12	Newcastle Knights (U19s W)	Saturday, 27 April, 1:30pm	CommBank Stadium	Ryan Micallef

===== Grand Final =====
2024 Tarsha Gale Cup Grand Final

Saturday, 27 April
1:30pm (AEST)

Illawarra Steelers	24 – 12	Newcastle Knights
Tries: Indie Bostock (14', 19') 2 Maria Paseka (9') 1 Bronte Wilson (53') 1 Goals: Chelsea Savill 4/4 (11', 15', 20', 55')	1st: 18 – 12; 2nd: 6 – 0 NSWRL; Dragons	Tries: 1 (2') Lilly McNamara; 1 (23') Aylah McCulloch; 1 (30') Malaki Poa; Goals: 0/3 Lilly McNamara

CommBank Stadium, Sydney
Referee: Ryan Micallef
Player of the Match: Indie Bostock

Team lists:

FB	1	Herewaka Pohatu
WG	2	Darcy Eade
CE	3	Indie Bostock
CE	4	Mia-Rose Walsh
WG	5	Maria Paseka
FE	6	Evie McGrath
HB	7	Kasey Reh (c)
PR	8	Hope Millard
HK	9	Chelsea Savill
PR	10	Ella Koster
SR	11	Charlotte Basham
SR	12	Makaylah McFayden
LK	13	Sienna Yeo
Substitutes:
IC	14	Bianca Jones
IC	15	Rhian Yeo
IC	16	Brielle Luccitti
IC	17	Bronte Wilson
Replacement:
RE	21	Runi Cowan
Coach:

Officials:

Ryan Micallef (Referee)

Olivia Lawne (Touch Judge)

Jake Walsh (Touch Judge)

Rhianna Boag (In Goal Judge)

Balunn Simon (In Goal Judge)

FB	1	Lilly-Anne White (c)
WG	2	Lilly McNamara
CE	3	Aylah McCulloch
CE	4	Eve Keeling
WG	5	Lacey Mitchell
FE	6	Evie Jones
HB	7	Kyah Johnston
PR	8	Sophie Smith
HK	9	Malaki Poa
PR	10	Elizabeth Montgomery
SR	11	Fane Finau
SR	12	Evah McEwan
LK	13	Makaah Darcy
Substitutes:
IC	14	Sarah Shankley
IC	15	Sienna Newsome
IC	16	Lailah Clarke
IC	17	Shatikka Eulo
Replacement:
RE	18	Georgina Pratley
Coach:

==== Player of the Series ====
Kasey Reh (Illawarra Steelers) was named Player of the Series.

== Under 18s ==
=== SLE Laurie Daley Cup ===
The Laurie Daley Cup is the statewide men's under 18s competition.

==== Teams ====
===== Northern Conference =====
Colours	Club	Home ground(s)	Head coach
	Central Coast Roosters	Morry Breen Oval	TBA
	Greater Northern Tigers	Scully Park, Farrer MAHS	TBA
	Newcastle-Maitland Region Knights	Cessnock Sportsground	TBA
	North Coast Bulldogs	Port Macquarie Regional Stadium	TBA
	Northern Rivers Titans	Various	TBA

===== Southern Conference =====
Colours	Club	Home ground(s)	Head coach
	Illawarra-South Coast Dragons	Ron Costello Oval, Centenary Field	TBA
	Macarthur-Wests Tigers	Kirkham Oval	TBA
	Monaro Colts	NSWRL HQ Bruce	TBA
	Riverina Bulls	Laurie Daley Oval, McDonalds Park	TBA
	Western Rams	Various	TBA

==== Ladders ====
===== Northern Conference =====
Pos	Team	Pld	W	D	L	B	PF	PA	PD	Pts
1	Greater Northern Tigers (U18s)	5	4	1	0	0	162	76	+86	9
2	Central Coast Roosters (U18s)	5	4	1	0	0	108	62	+56	9
3	Northern Rivers Titans (U18s)	5	2	0	3	0	152	122	+30	4
4	North Coast Bulldogs (U18s)	5	1	0	4	0	70	124	–54	2
5	Newcastle-Maitland Region Knights (U18s)	5	1	0	4	0	86	152	–76	2

Updated to match(es) played on 9 March. Source:
Rules for classification: 1) points; 2) point difference; 3) points scored

====== Ladder progression ======
- Numbers highlighted in green indicate that the team finished the round inside the top 2.
- Numbers highlighted in blue indicates the team finished first on the ladder in that round.
- Numbers highlighted in red indicates the team finished last place on the ladder in that round.

Pos	Team	1	2	4	5	3
1	Greater Northern Tigers (U18s)	2	4	7	9	9
2	Central Coast Roosters (U18s)	2	4	7	9	9
3	Northern Rivers Titans (U18s)	2	2	2	4	4
4	North Coast Bulldogs (U18s)	0	0	2	2	2
5	Newcastle-Maitland Region Knights (U18s)	0	0	2	2	2

===== Southern Conference =====
Pos	Team	Pld	W	D	L	B	PF	PA	PD	Pts
1	Monaro Colts (U18s)	5	4	0	1	0	172	66	+106	8
2	Macarthur-Wests Tigers (U18s)	5	4	0	1	0	144	96	+48	8
3	Illawarra-South Coast Dragons (U18s)	5	2	0	3	0	108	112	–4	4
4	Western Rams (U18s)	5	2	0	3	0	114	120	–6	4
5	Riverina Bulls (U18s)	5	0	0	5	0	64	250	-186	0

Updated to match(es) played on 9 March. Source:
Rules for classification: 1) points; 2) point difference; 3) points scored

====== Ladder progression ======
- Numbers highlighted in green indicate that the team finished the round inside the top 2.
- Numbers highlighted in blue indicates the team finished first on the ladder in that round.
- Numbers highlighted in red indicates the team finished last place on the ladder in that round.

Pos	Team	1	2	4	5	3
1	Monaro Colts (U18s)	0	2	6	8	8
2	Macarthur-Wests Tigers (U18s)	2	4	6	8	8
3	Illawarra-South Coast Dragons (U18s)	2	2	2	2	4
4	Western Rams (U18s)	0	2	4	4	4
5	Riverina Bulls (U18s)	0	0	0	0	0

Season Results:

Round 1

Home	Score	Away	Match Information
Home	Score	Away	Date and Time	Venue	Referee	Video
Central Coast Roosters (U18s)	14 – 0	Monaro Colts (U18s)	Saturday, 3 February, 11:20am	Morry Breen Oval	Matt Galvin
Northern Rivers Titans (U18s)	38 – 14	Newcastle-Maitland Region Knights (U18s)	Saturday, 3 February, 11:20am	Kingsford Smith Park	Nicholas Willer
Greater Northern Tigers (U18s)	36 – 6	North Coast Bulldogs (U18s)	Saturday, 3 February, 11:20am	Scully Park	Jack Fisher
Illawarra-South Coast Dragons (U18s)	48 – 6	Riverina Bulls (U18s)	Sunday, 4 February, 11:20am	Ron Costello Oval	Balunn Simon
Macarthur-Wests Tigers (U18s)	26 – 22	Western Rams (U18s)	Sunday, 4 February, 11:20am	Kirkham Oval	Liam Richardson

Round 2

Home	Score	Away	Match Information
Home	Score	Away	Date and Time	Venue	Referee	Video
Central Coast Roosters (U18s)	18 – 14	Northern Rivers Titans (U18s)	Saturday, 10 February, 11:20am	Morry Breen Oval	Brodie Rushby
Macarthur-Wests Tigers (U18s)	30 – 16	North Coast Bulldogs (U18s)	Saturday, 10 February, 11:30am	Kirkham Oval	Balunn Simon
Newcastle-Maitland Region Knights (U18s)	8 – 36	Greater Northern Tigers (U18s)	Saturday, 10 February, 12:20pm	Cessnock Sportsground	Jake Walsh
Western Rams (U18s)	40 – 12	Riverina Bulls (U18s)	Sunday, 11 February, 11:20am	Sid Kallas Oval	Liam Richardson
Monaro Colts (U18s)	38 – 12	Illawarra-South Coast Dragons (U18s)	Sunday, 11 February, 1:20pm	NSWRL HQ Bruce	Matt Galvin

Round 3

Home	Score	Away	Match Information
Home	Score	Away	Date and Time	Venue	Referee	Video
Greater Northern Tigers (U18s)	26 – 26	Central Coast Roosters (U18s)	Saturday, 17 February, 11:20am	Farrer MAHS	Jack Fisher
North Coast Bulldogs (U18s)	20 – 4	Newcastle-Maitland Region Knights (U18s)	Saturday, 17 February, 11:20am	Port Macquarie Regional Stadium	Jake Walsh
Western Rams (U18s)	18 – 40	Monaro Colts (U18s)	Sunday, 18 February, 11:20am	Jock Colley Oval	Rhianna Boag
Macarthur-Wests Tigers (U18s)	54 – 16	Riverina Bulls (U18s)	Sunday, 18 February, 11:20am	Kirkham Oval	Balunn Simon
Northern Rivers Titans (U18s)	16 – 26	Illawarra-South Coast Dragons (U18s)	Saturday, 9 March, 11:30am	Murwillumbah Leagues Club	Jack Thornton

Round 4

Home	Score	Away	Match Information
Home	Score	Away	Date and Time	Venue	Referee	Video
Central Coast Roosters (U18s)	10 – 8	North Coast Bulldogs (U18s)	Saturday, 24 February, 11:20am	Morry Breen Oval	Jake Walsh
Northern Rivers Titans (U18s)	30 – 34	Greater Northern Tigers (U18s)	Saturday, 24 February, 11:20am	Jack McGuren Field	Jack Thronton
Riverina Bulls (U18s)	18 – 46	Newcastle-Maitland Region Knights (U18s)	Sunday, 25 February, 11:20am	Laurie Daley Oval	Matt Galvin
Illawarra-South Coast Dragons (U18s)	12 – 28	Western Rams (U18s)	Sunday, 25 February, 11:20am	Ron Costello Oval	Rhianna Boag
Monaro Colts (U18s)	32 – 10	Macarthur-Wests Tigers (U18s)	Sunday, 25 February, 1:20pm	NSWRL HQ Bruce	Balunn Simon

Round 5

Home	Score	Away	Match Information
Home	Score	Away	Date and Time	Venue	Referee	Video
Newcastle-Maitland Region Knights (U18s)	14 – 40	Central Coast Roosters (U18s)	Saturday, 2 March, 10:45am	Cessnock Sportsground	Matthew Gomes
Western Rams (U18s)	6 – 30	Greater Northern Tigers (U18s)	Saturday, 2 March, 11:20am	Cale Oval	Balunn Simon
Illawarra-South Coast Dragons (U18s)	10 – 24	Macarthur-Wests Tigers (U18s)	Saturday, 2 March, 12:00pm	Centenary Field	Jake Walsh
North Coast Bulldogs (U18s)	20 – 44	Northern Rivers Titans (U18s)	Sunday, 3 March, 11:20am	Port Macquarie Regional Stadium	Jack Fisher
Riverina Bulls (U18s)	12 – 62	Monaro Colts (U18s)	Sunday, 3 March, 11:20am	McDonalds Park	Matt Galvin

==== Finals Series ====
Semi-Finals
1N	Greater Northern	28
2S	Macarthur-Wests	16
1S	Monaro	26
2N	Central Coast	18

Grand Final
1N	Greater Northern	18
1S	Monaro	28

Home	Score	Away	Match Information
Home	Score	Away	Date and Time	Venue	Referee	Video
Semi-Finals
Monaro Colts (U18s)	26 – 18	Central Coast Roosters (U18s)	Saturday, 16 March, 11:30am	Woy Woy Oval	Bailey Warren
Greater Northern Tigers (U18s)	28 – 16	Macarthur-Wests Tigers (U18s)	Sunday, 17 March, 12:30pm	Pirtek Park	Harrison Bayssari
Grand Final
Greater Northern Tigers (U18s)	18 – 28	Monaro Colts (U18s)	Sunday, 24 March, 12:15pm	Cessnock Sportsground	Harrison Bayssari

===== Grand Final =====
2024 Laurie Daley Cup Grand Final

Sunday, 24 March
12:15pm (AEDT)

Greater Northern Tigers	18 – 28	Monaro Colts
Tries: Keandre Johnson-Vale (14', 45') 2 Oscar Atkin (31') 1 Cooper Meldrum (50') 1 Goals: Dylan Keane 1/4 (52')	1st: 8 – 16; 2nd: 10 – 12	Tries: 2 (24', 38') Joseph Elton; 2 (9', 66') Mitchell Brophy; 1 (17') JJ Mau Pohiva; Goals: 4/5 Mitchell Brophy (11', 19', 40', 67')

Cessnock Sportsground, Cessnock
Referee: Harrison Bayssari
Player of the Match: Jonah Anderson

Team lists:

FB	1	Reece Josephson
WG	2	Keandre Johnson-Vale
CE	3	Samuel Carr
CE	4	Cooper Meldrum
WG	5	Oscar Atkin
FE	6	Jackson Smith
HB	7	Jordan Hamlin (c)
PR	8	Zane Groves
HK	9	Jack Foley
PR	10	Nate Rothall
SR	11	Braydon Allan
SR	12	Dylan Keane
LK	13	Dustin Wyrzykowski
Substitutes:
IC	15	Riley Fitzsimmons
IC	16	Jack McLeod
IC	17	Toby Jamieson
IC	18	Noah Hooley
Replacement:
RE	19	Jake Botfield
Coach:

Officials:

Harrison Bayssari (Referee)

Reece Sammut (Touch Judge)

Joshua Blackman (Touch Judge)

FB	1	James Croker
WG	2	Brady Smith
CE	3	Lake Tuialii
CE	4	Harry Hudson
WG	5	Lachlan Cunanan
FE	6	Clinton Latham
HB	7	Jonah Anderson
PR	8	Alex Hardy
HK	9	Mitchell Brophy
PR	17	JJ Mau Pohiva
SR	11	Joseph Elton
SR	12	Toby Ferris
LK	13	Dylan Watkins
Substitutes:
IC	14	Yuri Hromow
IC	15	Ash Flint
IC	16	Sam Lever
IC	20	Sam Griffin
Replacement:
RE	19	Jorge Constable
Coach:

== Under 17s ==
=== UNE Harold Matthews Cup ===
The Harold Matthews Cup is the statewide boy's under 17s competition.

==== Teams ====
Colours	Club	Home ground(s)	Head coach
	Balmain Tigers	Leichhardt Oval	TBA
	Canberra Raiders	Raiders Belconnen	TBA
	Canterbury-Bankstown Bulldogs	Terry Lamb Complex, Hammondville Oval	TBA
	Central Coast Roosters	Bill Hicks Oval	TBA
	Cronulla-Sutherland Sharks	PointsBet Stadium	TBA
	Illawarra Steelers	Collegians Sporting Complex	TBA
	Manly Warringah Sea Eagles	4 Pines Park	TBA
	Melbourne Storm	Seabrook Reserve	TBA
	New Zealand Warriors	Navigation Home Stadium	TBA
	Newcastle Knights	St Johns Oval, Cessnock Sportsground	TBA
	North Sydney Bears	Hills Grammar	TBA
	Parramatta Eels	Eric Tweedale Stadium	TBA
	Penrith Panthers	St Marys Leagues Stadium	TBA
	South Sydney Rabbitohs	Redfern Oval	TBA
	St George Dragons	Netstrada Jubilee Stadium	TBA
	Sydney Roosters	Various	TBA
	Western Suburbs Magpies	Kirkham Oval	TBA

==== Ladder ====
Pos	Team	Pld	W	D	L	B	PF	PA	PD	Pts	Qualification
1	Canterbury-Bankstown Bulldogs (U17s)	8	7	1	0	1	298	112	+186	17	Qualification to Semi-Finals
2	Western Suburbs Magpies (U17s)	8	7	1	0	1	250	114	+136	17	Qualification to Semi-Finals
3	Parramatta Eels (U17s)	8	6	2	0	1	220	105	+115	16	Qualification to Elimination Finals
4	Cronulla-Sutherland Sharks (U17s)	8	6	0	2	1	217	158	+59	14	Qualification to Elimination Finals
5	Sydney Roosters (U17s)	8	5	0	3	1	230	162	+68	12	Qualification to Elimination Finals
6	New Zealand Warriors (U17s)	8	5	0	3	1	170	159	+11	12	Qualification to Elimination Finals
7	Manly Warringah Sea Eagles (U17s)	8	4	1	3	1	140	128	+12	11	
8	Newcastle Knights (U17s)	8	4	0	4	1	172	144	+28	10	
9	Penrith Panthers (U17s)	8	4	0	4	1	198	194	+4	10	
10	Central Coast Roosters (U17s)	8	3	2	3	1	115	112	+3	10	
11	South Sydney Rabbitohs (U17s)	8	3	0	5	1	193	174	+19	8	
12	Melbourne Storm (U17s)	8	2	2	4	1	156	166	–10	8	
13	Illawarra Steelers (U17s)	8	3	0	5	1	120	200	–80	8	
14	Canberra Raiders (U17s)	8	2	0	6	1	160	221	–61	6	
15	St George Dragons (U17s)	8	2	0	6	1	104	256	-152	6	
16	North Sydney Bears (U17s)	8	0	1	7	1	90	212	-122	3	
17	Balmain Tigers (U17s)	8	0	0	8	1	42	258	-216	2	

Updated to match(es) played on 6 April. Source:
Rules for classification: 1) points; 2) point difference; 3) points scored

===== Ladder progression =====
- Numbers highlighted in green indicate that the team finished the round in an elimination final position.
- Numbers highlighted in blue indicates the team finished the round in a semi-final position.
- Numbers highlighted in red indicates the team finished last place on the ladder in that round.
- Underlined numbers indicate that the team had a bye during that round.

Pos	Team	1	2	3	4	5	6	7	9	8
1	Canterbury-Bankstown Bulldogs (U17s)	2	4	6	8	9	11	13	17	17
2	Western Suburbs Magpies (U17s)	2	4	6	8	10	12	14	17	17
3	Parramatta Eels (U17s)	2	4	6	8	9	11	13	16	16
4	Cronulla-Sutherland Sharks (U17s)	2	2	4	6	8	8	10	14	14
5	Sydney Roosters (U17s)	0	2	4	6	8	10	12	12	12
6	New Zealand Warriors (U17s)	0	2	2	4	6	8	10	12	12
7	Manly Warringah Sea Eagles (U17s)	2	4	6	6	6	6	8	11	11
8	Newcastle Knights (U17s)	2	2	2	4	6	8	8	10	10
9	Penrith Panthers (U17s)	2	4	4	4	6	6	6	10	10
10	Central Coast Roosters (U17s)	2	4	4	4	6	6	8	9	10
11	South Sydney Rabbitohs (U17s)	2	2	2	2	2	4	4	8	8
12	Melbourne Storm (U17s)	1	1	3	5	5	7	7	7	8
13	Illawarra Steelers (U17s)	0	2	4	4	4	4	6	8	8
14	Canberra Raiders (U17s)	0	0	0	2	2	4	4	6	6
15	St George Dragons (U17s)	0	0	2	4	6	6	6	6	6
16	North Sydney Bears (U17s)	1	3	3	3	3	3	3	3	3
17	Balmain Tigers (U17s)	0	0	2	2	2	2	2	2	2

Season Results:

Round 1

Home	Score	Away	Match Information
Home	Score	Away	Date and Time	Venue	Referee	Video
Canberra Raiders (U17s)	20 – 28	Newcastle Knights (U17s)	Saturday, 3 February, 11:00am	Raiders Belconnen	Lukas Durrant
Penrith Panthers (U17s)	44 – 4	St George Dragons (U17s)	Saturday, 3 February, 11:30am	BlueBet Stadium	Brodie Rushby
North Sydney Bears (U17s)	12 – 12	Melbourne Storm (U17s)	Saturday, 3 February, 1:00pm	Hills Grammar	Jake Walsh
Canterbury-Bankstown Bulldogs (U17s)	30 – 16	Sydney Roosters (U17s)	Saturday, 3 February, 1:00pm	Belmore Sports Ground	Curtis Robinson
Balmain Tigers (U17s)	6 – 32	Cronulla-Sutherland Sharks (U17s)	Saturday, 3 February, 1:30pm	PointsBet Stadium	Bailey Warren
Illawarra Steelers (U17s)	6 – 52	South Sydney Rabbitohs (U17s)	Saturday, 3 February, 1:30pm	Collegians Sporting Complex	Salvatore Marigliano
Parramatta Eels (U17s)	34 – 6	New Zealand Warriors (U17s)	Sunday, 4 February, 10:00am	Eric Tweedale Stadium	Matthew Gomes
Central Coast Roosters (U17s)	BYE	Western Suburbs Magpies (U17s)
Manly Warringah Sea Eagles (U17s)	BYE

Round 2

Home	Score	Away	Match Information
Home	Score	Away	Date and Time	Venue	Referee	Video
St George Dragons (U17s)	6 – 26	Manly Warringah Sea Eagles (U17s)	Saturday, 10 February, 10:00am	Netstrada Jubilee Stadium	Salvatore Marigliano
Penrith Panthers (U17s)	30 – 20	South Sydney Rabbitohs (U17s)	Saturday, 10 February, 11:30am	Windsor Sports Complex	Curtis Robinson
Cronulla-Sutherland Sharks (U17s)	20 – 34	Parramatta Eels (U17s)	Saturday, 10 February, 12:30pm	PointsBet Stadium	William Damato
Western Suburbs Magpies (U17s)	44 – 22	Melbourne Storm (U17s)	Saturday, 10 February, 1:00pm	Kirkham Oval	Bailey Warren
Balmain Tigers (U17s)	6 – 26	Sydney Roosters (U17s)	Saturday, 10 February, 1:00pm	Leichhardt Oval	Lukas Durrant
Newcastle Knights (U17s)	20 – 24	Canterbury-Bankstown Bulldogs (U17s)	Saturday, 10 February, 1:45pm	Cessnock Sportsground	Jayden Kastelan
Central Coast Roosters (U17s)	38 – 10	Canberra Raiders (U17s)	Saturday, 10 February, 2:30pm	Morry Breen Oval	Matthew Gomes
North Sydney Bears (U17s)	BYE	Illawarra Steelers (U17s)
New Zealand Warriors (U17s)	BYE

Round 3

Home	Score	Away	Match Information
Home	Score	Away	Date and Time	Venue	Referee	Video
Penrith Panthers (U17s)	10 – 46	Canterbury-Bankstown Bulldogs (U17s)	Saturday, 17 February, 10:00am	Windsor Sports Complex	Jayden Kastelan
South Sydney Rabbitohs (U17s)	6 – 24	Manly Warringah Sea Eagles (U17s)	Saturday, 17 February, 11:30am	Redfern Oval	Matthew Gomes
Illawarra Steelers (U17s)	20 – 0	Central Coast Roosters (U17s)	Saturday, 17 February, 12:30pm	Collegians Sporting Complex	Jabril Daizli
North Sydney Bears (U17s)	14 – 28	St George Dragons (U17s)	Saturday, 17 February, 1:00pm	Hills Grammar	Lukas Durrant
Cronulla-Sutherland Sharks (U17s)	19 – 18	Canberra Raiders (U17s)	Saturday, 17 February, 1:30pm	PointsBet Stadium	Liam Richardson
Newcastle Knights (U17s)	16 – 18	Western Suburbs Magpies (U17s)	Saturday, 17 February, 2:10pm	St John Oval	Brodie Rushby
Sydney Roosters (U17s)	28 – 18	New Zealand Warriors (U17s)	Sunday, 18 February, 10:30am	Morry Breen Oval	Salvatore Marigliano
Parramatta Eels (U17s)	BYE	Melbourne Storm (U17s)
Balmain Tigers (U17s)	BYE

Round 4

Home	Score	Away	Match Information
Home	Score	Away	Date and Time	Venue	Referee	Video
Newcastle Knights (U17s)	16 – 12	Central Coast Roosters (U17s)	Saturday, 24 February, 11:30am	Newcastle Centre of Excellence	Brodie Rushby
Sydney Roosters (U17s)	40 – 16	Penrith Panthers (U17s)	Saturday, 24 February, 12:30pm	Henson Park	Jayden Kastelan
Balmain Tigers (U17s)	16 – 38	Melbourne Storm (U17s)	Saturday, 24 February, 1:00pm	Leichhardt Oval	Lukas Durrant
Illawarra Steelers (U17s)	12 – 20	Parramatta Eels (U17s)	Saturday, 24 February, 1:30pm	WIN Stadium	Liam Richardson
Manly Warringah Sea Eagles (U17s)	6 – 40	Cronulla-Sutherland Sharks (U17s)	Saturday, 24 February, 2:15pm	4 Pines Park	Jabril Daizli
North Sydney Bears (U17s)	12 – 40	Western Suburbs Magpies (U17s)	Sunday, 25 February, 9:30am	Hills Grammar	Salvatore Marigliano
South Sydney Rabbitohs (U17s)	17 – 22	New Zealand Warriors (U17s)	Sunday, 25 February, 10:00am	Redfern Oval	Matthew Gomes
Canterbury-Bankstown Bulldogs (U17s)	BYE	St George Dragons (U17s)
Canberra Raiders (U17s)	BYE

Round 5

Home	Score	Away	Match Information
Home	Score	Away	Date and Time	Venue	Referee	Video
Penrith Panthers (U17s)	30 – 12	Illawarra Steelers (U17s)	Friday, 1 March, 6:30pm	Windsor Sports Complex	Jabril Daizli
Newcastle Knights (U17s)	16 – 6	Manly Warringah Sea Eagles (U17s)	Saturday, 2 March, 12:20pm	Kurri Kurri Sportsground	Salvatore Marigliano
Cronulla-Sutherland Sharks (U17s)	28 – 14	South Sydney Rabbitohs (U17s)	Saturday, 2 March, 12:30pm	PointsBet Stadium	Lukas Durrant
Melbourne Storm (U17s)	18 – 22	St George Dragons (U17s)	Saturday, 2 March, 1:00pm	Seabrook Reserve	Jonathan Nicholls
North Sydney Bears (U17s)	10 – 14	Central Coast Roosters (U17s)	Saturday, 2 March, 1:00pm	Hills Grammar	Jayden Kastelan
Parramatta Eels (U17s)	20 – 20	Canterbury-Bankstown Bulldogs (U17s)	Saturday, 2 March, 1:00pm	Eric Tweedale Stadium	Rhianna Boag
Western Suburbs Magpies (U17s)	36 – 12	Canberra Raiders (U17s)	Saturday, 2 March, 1:00pm	Kirkham Oval	Brodie Rushby
New Zealand Warriors (U17s)	16 – 4	Balmain Tigers (U17s)	Sunday, 3 March, 10:00am	Navigation Home Stadium	Jack Feavers
Sydney Roosters (U17s)		BYE

Round 6

Home	Score	Away	Match Information
Home	Score	Away	Date and Time	Venue	Referee	Video
Canterbury-Bankstown Bulldogs (U17s)	48 – 12	Cronulla-Sutherland Sharks (U17s)	Saturday, 9 March, 10:00am	Terry Lamb Complex	Jayden Kastelan
Western Suburbs Magpies (U17s)	38 – 0	Balmain Tigers (U17s)	Saturday, 9 March, 11:00am	Lidcombe Oval	Harrison Bayssari
Central Coast Roosters (U17s)	21 – 28	Parramatta Eels (U17s)	Saturday, 9 March, 12:00pm	Woy Woy Oval	Lukas Durrant
South Sydney Rabbitohs (U17s)	38 – 16	North Sydney Bears (U17s)	Saturday, 9 March, 12:30pm	Redfern Oval	Jabril Daizli
Melbourne Storm (U17s)	40 – 6	Manly Warringah Sea Eagles (U17s)	Saturday, 9 March, 1:00pm	Seabrook Reserve	William Roache
Canberra Raiders (U17s)	34 – 28	Penrith Panthers (U17s)	Saturday, 9 March, 1:30pm	Raiders Belconnen	Liam Richardson
Sydney Roosters (U17s)	46 – 16	St George Dragons (U17s)	Saturday, 9 March, 1:30pm	Woy Woy Oval	Bailey Warren
New Zealand Warriors (U17s)	26 – 16	Illawarra Steelers (U17s)	Sunday, 10 March, 10:00am	Navigation Home Stadium	Viggo Rasmussen
Newcastle Knights (U17s)		BYE

Round 7

Home	Score	Away	Match Information
Home	Score	Away	Date and Time	Venue	Referee	Video
Western Suburbs Magpies (U17s)	26 – 14	South Sydney Rabbitohs (U17s)	Saturday, 16 March, 10:00am	Kirkham Oval	Rhianna Boag
Central Coast Roosters (U17s)	14 – 12	Penrith Panthers (U17s)	Saturday, 16 March, 10:30am	Morry Breen Oval	Brodie Rushby
St George Dragons (U17s)	4 – 28	Illawarra Steelers (U17s)	Saturday, 16 March, 11:00am	Netstrada Jubilee Stadium	Balunn Simon
Melbourne Storm (U17s)	0 – 34	Parramatta Eels (U17s)	Saturday, 16 March, 12:45pm	Goschs Paddock	William Roache
Canterbury-Bankstown Bulldogs (U17s)	46 – 0	Balmain Tigers (U17s)	Saturday, 16 March, 12:45pm	Terry Lamb Complex	Lukas Durrant
Manly Warringah Sea Eagles (U17s)	26 – 0	North Sydney Bears (U17s)	Saturday, 16 March, 1:00pm	HE Laybutt Field	Aidan Richardson
Sydney Roosters (U17s)	30 – 18	Newcastle Knights (U17s)	Saturday, 16 March, 1:30pm	Mascot Oval	Salvatore Marigliano
New Zealand Warriors (U17s)	26 – 10	Canberra Raiders (U17s)	Sunday, 17 March, 9:00am	Navigation Home Stadium	Liam O'Brien
Cronulla-Sutherland Sharks (U17s)		BYE

Round 8

Home	Score	Away	Match Information
Home	Score	Away	Date and Time	Venue	Referee	Video
Manly Warringah Sea Eagles (U17s)	30 – 4	Balmain Tigers (U17s)	Saturday, 23 March, 1:00pm	4 Pines Park	Rhianna Boag
Western Suburbs Magpies (U17s)	32 – 22	Sydney Roosters (U17s)	Saturday, 23 March, 1:00pm	Kirkham Oval	Jabril Daizli
Parramatta Eels (U17s)	34 – 10	North Sydney Bears (U17s)	Saturday, 23 March, 1:15pm	Eric Tweedale Stadium	Matthew Galvin
Penrith Panthers (U17s)	28 – 24	Newcastle Knights (U17s)	Saturday, 23 March, 3:30pm	St Marys Leagues Stadium	Brodie Rushby
New Zealand Warriors (U17s)	10 – 40	Cronulla-Sutherland Sharks (U17s)	Sunday, 24 March, 11:15am	Navigation Home Stadium	Jack Feavers
Canterbury-Bankstown Bulldogs (U17s)	52 – 6	Illawarra Steelers (U17s)	Sunday, 24 March, 11:30am	Hammondville Oval	Liam Richardson
St George Dragons (U17s)	14 – 34	Canberra Raiders (U17s)	Sunday, 24 March, 1:00pm	Forshaw Park	Balunn Simon
Central Coast Roosters (U17s)	0 – 0	Melbourne Storm (U17s)	Saturday, 6 April, 1:30pm	Woy Woy Oval	N/A
South Sydney Rabbitohs (U17s)		BYE

Round 9

Home	Score	Away	Match Information
Home	Score	Away	Date and Time	Venue	Referee	Video
Parramatta Eels (U17s)	16 – 16	Western Suburbs Magpies (U17s)	Friday, 29 March, 11:00am	Eric Tweedale Stadium	Lukas Durrant
Canberra Raiders (U17s)	22 – 32	South Sydney Rabbitohs (U17s)	Saturday, 30 March, 12:00pm	Seiffert Oval	Stuart Halsey
Melbourne Storm (U17s)	28 – 32	Canterbury-Bankstown Bulldogs (U17s)	Saturday, 30 March, 1:00pm	Seabrook Reserve	Mohammad Hussaini
Balmain Tigers (U17s)	6 – 34	Newcastle Knights (U17s)	Saturday, 30 March, 1:00pm	Leichhardt Oval	Matthew Galvin
Manly Warringah Sea Eagles (U17s)	16 – 16	Central Coast Roosters (U17s)	Saturday, 30 March, 1:30pm	4 Pines Park	Salvatore Marigliano
Cronulla-Sutherland Sharks (U17s)	26 – 22	Sydney Roosters (U17s)	Saturday, 30 March, 1:30pm	PointsBet Stadium	Balunn Simon
Illawarra Steelers (U17s)	20 – 16	North Sydney Bears (U17s)	Saturday, 30 March, 1:30pm	Collegians Sporting Complex	Rhianna Boag
New Zealand Warriors (U17s)	46 – 10	St George Dragons (U17s)	Sunday, 31 March, 10:00am	Navigation Home Stadium	Jack Feavers
Penrith Panthers (U17s)		BYE

==== Finals Series ====
Elimination Finals
3	Parramatta	20
6	New Zealand	30
4	Cronulla-Sutherland	30
5	Sydney	22

Semi-Finals
1	Canterbury-Bankstown	10
6	New Zealand	12
2	Western Suburbs	8
4	Cronulla-Sutherland	6

Grand Final
2	Western Suburbs	16
6	New Zealand	34

Home	Score	Away	Match Information
Home	Score	Away	Date and Time	Venue	Referee	Video
Elimination Finals
Parramatta Eels (U17s)	20 – 30	New Zealand Warriors (U17s)	Sunday, 14 April, 10:00am	Leichhardt Oval	Ryan Micallef
Cronulla-Sutherland Sharks (U17s)	30 – 22	Sydney Roosters (U17s)	Sunday, 14 April, 1:15pm	Leichhardt Oval	Isaac El Hassan
Semi-Finals
Canterbury-Bankstown Bulldogs (U17s)	10 – 12	New Zealand Warriors (U17s)	Saturday, 20 April, 11:00am	Henson Park	Isaac El Hassan
Western Suburbs Magpies (U17s)	8 – 6	Cronulla-Sutherland Sharks (U17s)	Saturday, 20 April, 11:00am	Leichhardt Oval	Ryan Micallef
Grand Final
Western Suburbs Magpies (U17s)	16 – 34	New Zealand Warriors (U17s)	Saturday, 27 April, 12:00pm	CommBank Stadium	Gage Miles

===== Grand Final =====
2024 Harold Matthews Cup Grand Final

Saturday, 27 April
12:00pm (AEST)

Western Suburbs Magpies	16 – 34	New Zealand Warriors
Tries: Pheonix Godinet (4') 1 Jhevon Lele (7') 1 Christian Taupau-Moors (51') 1 Goals: Heamasi Makasini 2/3 (5', 52')	1st: 10 – 24; 2nd: 6 – 10; NSWRL	Tries: 2 (12', 29') Jack Thompson; 1 (19') Militonimolela Sikuvea; 1 (23') Ezekiel Davidson-Faaiuaso; 1 (48') Boston Krone; 1 (56') Lennox Tuiloma; Goals: 5/7 Kairus Booth (14', 21', 27'p, 30', 57')

CommBank Stadium, Sydney
Referee: Gage Miles
Player of the Match: Lennox Tuiloma

Team lists:

FB	1	Ali Hicham Karnib
WG	2	Tyson Walker
CE	3	Glassie Glassie
CE	4	Heamasi Makasini
WG	5	Thomas Goodfield
FE	6	Jhevon Lele
HB	7	Alex Isdale (c)
PR	10	Christian Taupau-Moors
HK	9	Ashton Large
PR	20	Leviticus Tovia
SR	11	Teancam Epati
SR	12	Pheonix Godinet
LK	13	Peter Taai
Substitutes:
IC	14	Lorima Cosgrave
IC	15	Siotame Havea Jr
IC	17	Peter French
IC	19	Henare Reti
Replacement:
RE	18	Stirling Faumui
Coach:

Officials:

Gage Miles (Referee)

Luke Mulligan (Touch Judge)

Jabril Daizli (Touch Judge)

Salvatore Marigliano (In Goal Judge)

Logan Nielsen (In Goal Judge)

FB	1	Joseph Ratcliffe
WG	2	Ezekiel Davidson-Faaiuaso
CE	3	Jeremiah Lemana
CE	4	Turama Paranihi
WG	5	Kairus Booth
FE	6	Tyson Hansen
HB	7	Jack Thompson
PR	8	Hudsyn Frost
HK	9	Kaawyn Patterson (c)
PR	10	Gordon Pailegutu Taanuu Afoa
SR	11	Dezman Laban
SR	12	Militonimolela Sikuvea
LK	13	Lennox Tuiloma
Substitutes:
IC	14	Boston Krone
IC	15	Romana Whitiora
IC	16	Houma Fotu
IC	17	Isaiah Savea
Replacement:
RE	18	Deshontayne Te Wao
Coach:

==== Player of the Series ====
Heamasi Makasini (Western Suburbs Magpies) was named Player of the Series.

=== Westpac Lisa Fiaola Cup (Metro) ===
The Lisa Fiaola Cup (Metro) is the state's metropolitan girl's under 17s competition.

==== Teams ====
Colours	Club	Home ground(s)	Head coach
	Canterbury-Bankstown Bulldogs	Terry Lamb Complex, Hammondville Oval	TBA
	Central Coast Roosters	Bill Hicks Oval	TBA
	Cronulla-Sutherland Sharks	PointsBet Stadium	TBA
	Illawarra Steelers	Collegians Sporting Complex	TBA
	Manly Warringah Sea Eagles	4 Pines Park	TBA
	Newcastle Knights	St Johns Oval, Cessnock Sportsground	TBA
	North Sydney Bears	Hills Grammar	TBA
	Parramatta Eels	Eric Tweedale Stadium	TBA
	Penrith Panthers	St Marys Leagues Stadium	TBA
	South Sydney Rabbitohs	Redfern Oval	TBA
	St George Dragons	Netstrada Jubilee Stadium	TBA
	Sydney Roosters	Various	TBA
	Wests Tigers	Leichhardt Oval, Kirkham Oval	TBA

==== Ladder ====
Pos	Team	Pld	W	D	L	B	PF	PA	PD	Pts	Qualification
1	Canterbury-Bankstown Bulldogs (U17s G)	8	8	0	0	1	468	48	+420	18	Qualification to Semi-Finals
2	Illawarra Steelers (U17s G)	8	7	0	1	1	238	92	+146	16	Qualification to Semi-Finals
3	Parramatta Eels (U17s G)	8	6	0	2	1	232	90	+142	14	Qualification to Elimination Finals
4	Central Coast Roosters (U17s G)	8	6	0	2	1	206	78	+128	14	Qualification to Elimination Finals
5	Wests Tigers (U17s G)	8	6	0	2	1	218	108	+110	14	Qualification to Elimination Finals
6	Newcastle Knights (U17s G)	8	5	0	3	1	212	108	+104	12	Qualification to Elimination Finals
7	Sydney Roosters (U17s G)	8	5	0	3	1	220	136	+84	12	
8	Cronulla-Sutherland Sharks (U17s G)	8	2	0	6	1	104	170	–66	6	
9	Penrith Panthers (U17s G)	8	2	0	6	1	96	192	–96	6	
10	Manly Warringah Sea Eagles (U17s G)	8	2	0	6	1	94	276	-182	6	
11	South Sydney Rabbitohs (U17s G)	8	1	1	6	1	76	206	-130	5	
12	North Sydney Bears (U17s G)	8	1	1	6	1	48	300	-252	5	
13	St George Dragons (U17s G)	8	0	0	8	1	16	424	-408	2	

Updated to match(es) played on 31 March. Source:
Rules for classification: 1) points; 2) point difference; 3) points scored

===== Ladder progression =====
- Numbers highlighted in green indicate that the team finished the round in an elimination final position.
- Numbers highlighted in blue indicates the team finished the round in a semi-final position.
- Numbers highlighted in red indicates the team finished last place on the ladder in that round.
- Underlined numbers indicate that the team had a bye during that round.

Pos	Team	1	2	3	4	5	6	7	8	9
1	Canterbury-Bankstown Bulldogs (U17s G)	2	4	6	8	10	12	14	16	18
2	Illawarra Steelers (U17s G)	2	4	6	6	8	10	12	14	16
3	Parramatta Eels (U17s G)	0	2	4	6	8	10	10	12	14
4	Central Coast Roosters (U17s G)	2	2	4	6	6	8	10	12	14
5	Wests Tigers (U17s G)	2	2	4	6	8	10	10	12	14
6	Newcastle Knights (U17s G)	0	0	0	2	4	6	8	10	12
7	Sydney Roosters (U17s G)	2	4	6	8	8	8	8	10	12
8	Cronulla-Sutherland Sharks (U17s G)	0	0	0	0	2	4	6	6	6
9	Penrith Panthers (U17s G)	2	4	4	4	6	6	6	6	6
10	Manly Warringah Sea Eagles (U17s G)	2	4	4	6	6	6	6	6	6
11	South Sydney Rabbitohs (U17s G)	0	0	2	2	2	3	5	5	5
12	North Sydney Bears (U17s G)	0	2	2	2	2	3	5	5	5
13	St George Dragons (U17s G)	0	0	0	2	2	2	2	2	2

Season Results:

Round 1

Home	Score	Away	Match Information
Home	Score	Away	Date and Time	Venue	Referee	Video
Penrith Panthers (U17s G)	36 – 0	St George Dragons (U17s G)	Saturday, 3 February, 10:00am	BlueBet Stadium	Aden Hayward
Canterbury-Bankstown Bulldogs (U17s G)	36 – 10	Parramatta Eels (U17s G)	Saturday, 3 February, 10:00am	Belmore Sports Ground	James Fitzgerald
Cronulla-Sutherland Sharks (U17s G)	18 – 20	Wests Tigers (U17s G)	Saturday, 3 February, 10:00am	PointsBet Stadium	Logan Neilsen
North Sydney Bears (U17s G)	6 – 44	Sydney Roosters (U17s G)	Saturday, 3 February, 10:30am	Hills Grammar	Tallon Irons
Illawarra Steelers (U17s G)	14 – 12	South Sydney Rabbitohs (U17s G)	Saturday, 3 February, 10:30am	Collegians Sporting Complex	Jesse McQuire
Central Coast Roosters (U17s G)	12 – 6	Newcastle Knights (U17s G)	Saturday, 3 February, 1:00pm	Morry Breen Oval	Callum Richardson
Manly Warringah Sea Eagles (U17s G)		BYE

Round 2

Home	Score	Away	Match Information
Home	Score	Away	Date and Time	Venue	Referee	Video
Cronulla-Sutherland Sharks (U17s G)	4 – 12	Parramatta Eels (U17s G)	Saturday, 10 February, 9:00am	PointsBet Stadium	Jaylen Chasle
Penrith Panthers (U17s G)	14 – 8	South Sydney Rabbitohs (U17s G)	Saturday, 10 February, 10:00am	Windsor Sports Complex	Jesse McQuire
Wests Tigers (U17s G)	18 – 20	Sydney Roosters (U17s G)	Saturday, 10 February, 10:00am	Leichhardt Oval	Tallon Irons
Central Coast Roosters (U17s G)	10 – 12	Illawarra Steelers (U17s G)	Saturday, 10 February, 1:00pm	Morry Breen Oval	Callum Richardson
Canterbury-Bankstown Bulldogs (U17s G)	38 – 16	Newcastle Knights (U17s G)	Saturday, 10 February, 1:30pm	Hammondville Oval	Nelson Pantelis
St George Dragons (U17s G)	4 – 46	Manly Warringah Sea Eagles (U17s G)	Saturday, 10 February, 3:00pm	Netstrada Jubilee Stadium	James Fitzgerald
North Sydney Bears (U17s G)		BYE

Round 3

Home	Score	Away	Match Information
Home	Score	Away	Date and Time	Venue	Referee	Video
Cronulla-Sutherland Sharks (U17s G)	6 – 36	Central Coast Roosters (U17s G)	Saturday, 17 February, 10:00am	PointsBet Stadium	Joshua Blackman
Penrith Panthers (U17s G)	4 – 48	Canterbury-Bankstown Bulldogs (U17s G)	Saturday, 17 February, 10:00am	Federation Forest Reserve	Josh Williamson
Sydney Roosters (U17s G)	58 – 0	St George Dragons (U17s G)	Saturday, 17 February, 10:00am	Henson Park	Jaylen Chasle
North Sydney Bears (U17s G)	8 – 42	Illawarra Steelers (U17s G)	Saturday, 17 February, 10:30am	Hills Grammar	Harrison Buxton
Newcastle Knights (U17s G)	18 – 22	Wests Tigers (U17s G)	Saturday, 17 February, 11:30am	St John Oval	Nathan Hillier
South Sydney Rabbitohs (U17s G)	28 – 0	Manly Warringah Sea Eagles (U17s G)	Sunday, 18 February, 1:00pm	Mascot Oval	Alexander Pruscino
Parramatta Eels (U17s G)		BYE

Round 4

Home	Score	Away	Match Information
Home	Score	Away	Date and Time	Venue	Referee	Video
Sydney Roosters (U17s G)	22 – 8	Penrith Panthers (U17s G)	Saturday, 24 February, 9:30am	Henson Park	Harrison Buxton
Wests Tigers (U17s G)	44 – 0	North Sydney Bears (U17s G)	Saturday, 24 February, 10:00am	Leichhardt Oval	Olivia Lawne
Illawarra Steelers (U17s G)	16 – 32	Parramatta Eels (U17s G)	Saturday, 24 February, 10:30am	WIN Stadium	Joshua Blackman
Manly Warringah Sea Eagles (U17s G)	22 – 6	Cronulla-Sutherland Sharks (U17s G)	Sunday, 25 February, 11:00am	4 Pines Park	Jesse McQuire
South Sydney Rabbitohs (U17s G)	10 – 58	Canterbury-Bankstown Bulldogs (U17s G)	Sunday, 25 February, 1:30pm	Redfern Oval	Aidan Richardson
Central Coast Roosters (U17s G)	BYE	St George Dragons (U17s G)
Newcastle Knights (U17s G)	BYE

Round 5

Home	Score	Away	Match Information
Home	Score	Away	Date and Time	Venue	Referee	Video
Cronulla-Sutherland Sharks (U17s G)	26 – 6	South Sydney Rabbitohs (U17s G)	Saturday, 2 March, 9:00am	PointsBet Stadium	Jaylen Chasle
Parramatta Eels (U17s G)	44 – 0	St George Dragons (U17s G)	Saturday, 2 March, 10:00am	Eric Tweedale Stadium	Alexander Pruscino
Wests Tigers (U17s G)	26 – 16	Central Coast Roosters (U17s G)	Saturday, 2 March, 10:00am	Kirkham Oval	Tallon Irons
North Sydney Bears (U17s G)	0 – 60	Canterbury-Bankstown Bulldogs (U17s G)	Saturday, 2 March, 10:30am	Hills Grammar	Rami Abu-Mansour
Illawarra Steelers (U17s G)	26 – 10	Sydney Roosters (U17s G)	Saturday, 2 March, 10:30am	Sid Parrish Park	Callum Rigby
Newcastle Knights (U17s G)	44 – 6	Manly Warringah Sea Eagles (U17s G)	Saturday, 2 March, 11:00am	Kurri Kurri Sportsground	Brody Barrie
Penrith Panthers (U17s G)		BYE

Round 6

Home	Score	Away	Match Information
Home	Score	Away	Date and Time	Venue	Referee	Video
South Sydney Rabbitohs (U17s G)	12 – 12	North Sydney Bears (U17s G)	Saturday, 9 March, 9:30am	Redfern Oval	Jake Walsh
Sydney Roosters (U17s G)	4 – 50	Parramatta Eels (U17s G)	Saturday, 9 March, 9:45am	Eric Tweedale Stadium	Matthew Galvin
Central Coast Roosters (U17s G)	24 – 10	Penrith Panthers (U17s G)	Saturday, 9 March, 10:30am	Woy Woy Oval	Aidan Richardson
Newcastle Knights (U17s G)	40 – 8	St George Dragons (U17s G)	Saturday, 9 March, 11:10am	St John Oval	Callum Richardson
Canterbury-Bankstown Bulldogs (U17s G)	94 – 0	Manly Warringah Sea Eagles (U17s G)	Saturday, 9 March, 1:00pm	Terry Lamb Complex	Will Flint
Cronulla-Sutherland Sharks (U17s G)	BYE	Illawarra Steelers (U17s G)
Wests Tigers (U17s G)	BYE

Round 7

Home	Score	Away	Match Information
Home	Score	Away	Date and Time	Venue	Referee	Video
Manly Warringah Sea Eagles (U17s G)	12 – 14	North Sydney Bears (U17s G)	Saturday, 16 March, 10:00am	HE Laybutt Field	Lachlan Bryant
Penrith Panthers (U17s G)	14 – 30	Cronulla-Sutherland Sharks (U17s G)	Saturday, 16 March, 10:30am	St Marys Leagues Stadium	Stuart Halsey
Sydney Roosters (U17s G)	18 – 20	Newcastle Knights (U17s G)	Saturday, 16 March, 10:30am	Mascot Oval	Wilson Hooper
Parramatta Eels (U17s G)	14 – 22	Central Coast Roosters (U17s G)	Saturday, 16 March, 10:45am	Eric Tweedale Stadium	Ben Raymond
St George Dragons (U17s G)	0 – 60	Illawarra Steelers (U17s G)	Saturday, 16 March, 12:30pm	Netstrada Jubilee Stadium	Bailey Clark
Canterbury-Bankstown Bulldogs (U17s G)	36 – 8	Wests Tigers (U17s G)	Saturday, 16 March, 1:00pm	Kirkham Oval	Callum Rigby
South Sydney Rabbitohs (U17s G)		BYE

Round 8

Home	Score	Away	Match Information
Home	Score	Away	Date and Time	Venue	Referee	Video
Parramatta Eels (U17s G)	40 – 4	North Sydney Bears (U17s G)	Saturday, 23 March, 9:45am	Eric Tweedale Stadium	Bailey Clark
Wests Tigers (U17s G)	38 – 0	South Sydney Rabbitohs (U17s G)	Saturday, 23 March, 10:00am	Kirkham Oval	Callum Rigby
Penrith Panthers (U17s G)	6 – 30	Illawarra Steelers (U17s G)	Saturday, 23 March, 11:00am	St Marys Leagues Stadium	Stuart Halsey
Newcastle Knights (U17s G)	22 – 0	Cronulla-Sutherland Sharks (U17s G)	Saturday, 23 March, 11:30am	Cessnock Sportsground	Wilson Hooper
Manly Warringah Sea Eagles (U17s G)	8 – 44	Sydney Roosters (U17s G)	Saturday, 23 March, 2:30pm	4 Pines Park	Lachlan Bryant
St George Dragons (U17s G)	4 – 42	Central Coast Roosters (U17s G)	Sunday, 24 March, 10:00am	Forshaw Park	Carter Spowart Lehmann
Canterbury-Bankstown Bulldogs (U17s G)		BYE

Round 9

Home	Score	Away	Match Information
Home	Score	Away	Date and Time	Venue	Referee	Video
Parramatta Eels (U17s G)	30 – 4	Penrith Panthers (U17s G)	Thursday, 28 March, 6:00pm	Eric Tweedale Stadium	Bailey Clark
Manly Warringah Sea Eagles (U17s G)	0 – 42	Wests Tigers (U17s G)	Saturday, 30 March, 10:30am	4 Pines Park	Lachlan Bryant
Illawarra Steelers (U17s G)	38 – 14	Cronulla-Sutherland Sharks (U17s G)	Saturday, 30 March, 10:30am	Collegians Sporting Complex	Carter Spowart Lehmann
North Sydney Bears (U17s G)	4 – 46	Newcastle Knights (U17s G)	Saturday, 30 March, 11:00am	NSWRL Centre of Excellence	Indiana Manion
Central Coast Roosters (U17s G)	44 – 0	South Sydney Rabbitohs (U17s G)	Saturday, 30 March, 11:00am	Bill Hicks Oval	Tristan Brooker
St George Dragons (U17s G)	0 – 98	Canterbury-Bankstown Bulldogs (U17s G)	Saturday, 30 March, 1:00pm	Netstrada Jubilee Stadium	Patrick Fosse
Sydney Roosters (U17s G)		BYE

==== Finals Series ====
Elimination Finals
3	Parramatta	10
6	Newcastle	22
4	Central Coast	22
5	Wests	24

Semi-Finals
1	Canterbury-Bankstown	22
6	Newcastle	4
2	Illawarra	14
5	Wests	32

Grand Final
1	Canterbury-Bankstown	36
5	Wests	0

Home	Score	Away	Match Information
Home	Score	Away	Date and Time	Venue	Referee	Video
Elimination Finals
Central Coast Roosters (U17s G)	22 – 24	Wests Tigers (U17s G)	Saturday, 13 April, 12:00pm	Leichhardt Oval	Salvatore Marigliano
Parramatta Eels (U17s G)	10 – 22	Newcastle Knights (U17s G)	Saturday, 13 April, 1:30pm	Leichhardt Oval	Lukas Durrant
Semi-Finals
Illawarra Steelers (U17s G)	14 – 32	Wests Tigers (U17s G)	Saturday, 20 April, 12:30pm	Leichhardt Oval	Lukas Durrant
Canterbury-Bankstown Bulldogs (U17s G)	22 – 4	Newcastle Knights (U17s G)	Saturday, 20 April, 3:30pm	Leichhardt Oval	Salvatore Marigliano
Grand Final
Canterbury-Bankstown Bulldogs (U17s G)	36 – 0	Wests Tigers (U17s G)	Saturday, 27 April, 10:30am	CommBank Stadium	Isaac El-Hassan

===== Grand Final =====
2024 Lisa Fiaola Cup Metro Grand Final

Saturday, 27 April
10:30am (AEST)

Canterbury-Bankstown Bulldogs	36 – 0	Wests Tigers
Tries: Asha Taumoepeau-Williams (2', 19', 40', 57') 4 Evelyn Roberts (22', 51') 2 Aliahana Fuimaono (16') 1 Lahnayah Daniel (49') 1 Goals: Olivia Vaalele 2/6 (23', 53'); Evelyn Roberts 0/2	1st: 18 – 0; 2nd: 18 – 0 NSWRL

CommBank Stadium, Sydney
Referee: Isaac El-Hassan
Player of the Match: Mary-Jane Taito

Team lists:

FB	1	Nazlyn Waaka-Rhind
WG	2	Kiana Vatubua
CE	3	Lahnayah Daniel
CE	4	Tejahla-Jane Daniels-Maifea
WG	5	Asha Taumoepeau-Williams
FE	6	Evelyn Roberts
HB	7	Olivia Vaalele (c)
PR	8	Seriah Palepale
HK	9	Mary-Jane Taito
PR	10	Heilala Fifita
SR	11	Aliahana Fuimaono
SR	12	Paige Tauaneai
LK	13	Trinity Tauaneai
Substitutes:
IC	14	Abbey Fuz
IC	15	Josinah Filisi Tauiliili
IC	16	Taylah Salapo
IC	17	Jayde Freeman
Replacement:
RE	20	Caliche Toki-Rimene
Coach:

Officials:

Isaac El-Hassan (Referee)

Jack Gerrie (Touch Judge)

Aidan Richardson (Touch Judge)

Stuart Halsey (In Goal Judge)

Bailey Clark (In Goal Judge)

FB	1	Rhiannon Bonner
WG	5	Sakari Ritchie
CE	3	Elanor Ward
CE	4	Layla Tima
WG	15	Isabel McMenemy
FE	6	Agnews Faaui
HB	7	Ellie Barnett (c)
PR	8	May Fuimaono
HK	9	Paige Attard
PR	10	Aliana Fasavalu-Fa'amausili
SR	11	Lucyannah Luamanu-Leiataua
SR	12	Annelise Hall
LK	13	Angel Schaafhausen-Mino
Substitutes:
IC	2	Kealii-Jordan Muru
IC	14	Sienna Robertson
IC	16	Hayley Firman
IC	17	Alavina Tu'ifua
Replacement:
RE	18	Talia Pele Taula
Coach:

==== Player of the Series ====
Evelyn Roberts (Canterbury-Bankstown Bulldogs) was named Player of the Series.

=== Westpac Lisa Fiaola Cup (Regional) ===
The Lisa Fiaola Cup (Regional) is the state's regional girl's under 17s competition.

==== Teams ====
===== Northern Conference =====
Colours	Club	Home ground(s)	Head coach
	Greater Northern Tigers	Scully Park	TBA
	North Coast Bulldogs	Rex Hardaker Oval	TBA
	Northern Rivers Titans	Frank McGuren Field	TBA

===== Southern Conference =====
Colours	Club	Home ground(s)	Head coach
	Monaro Colts	McLean Oval	TBA
	Riverina Bulls	Laurie Daley Oval, McDonalds Park	TBA
	Western Rams	N/A	TBA

==== Ladders ====
===== Northern Conference =====
Pos	Team	Pld	W	D	L	B	PF	PA	PD	Pts
1	Greater Northern Tigers (U17s G)	2	2	0	0	1	44	18	+26	6
2	Northern Rivers Titans (U17s G)	2	0	1	1	1	28	34	–6	3
3	North Coast Bulldogs (U17s G)	2	0	1	1	1	10	30	–20	3

Updated to match(es) played on 10 March. Source:
Rules for classification: 1) points; 2) point difference; 3) points scored

====== Ladder progression ======
- Numbers highlighted in green indicates the team finished first on the ladder in that round.
- Numbers highlighted in red indicates the team finished last place on the ladder in that round.

Pos	Team	1	2	3
1	Greater Northern Tigers (U17s G)	2	4	6
2	Northern Rivers Titans (U17s G)	0	1	3
3	North Coast Bulldogs (U17s G)	2	3	3

===== Southern Conference =====
Pos	Team	Pld	W	D	L	B	PF	PA	PD	Pts
1	Western Rams (U17s G)	2	2	0	0	1	96	22	+74	6
2	Monaro Colts (U17s G)	2	1	0	1	1	80	26	+54	4
3	Riverina Bulls (U17s G)	2	0	0	2	0	10	138	-128	0

Updated to match(es) played on 10 March. Source:
Rules for classification: 1) points; 2) point difference; 3) points scored

====== Ladder progression ======
- Numbers highlighted in green indicates the team finished first on the ladder in that round.
- Numbers highlighted in red indicates the team finished last place on the ladder in that round.

Pos	Team	1	2	3
1	Western Rams (U17s G)	2	4	6
2	Monaro Colts (U17s G)	2	4	4
3	Riverina Bulls (U17s G)	0	0	2

Season Results:

Round 1

Home	Score	Away	Match Information
Home	Score	Away	Date and Time	Venue	Referee	Video
Northern Rivers Titans (U17s G)	18 – 24	Greater Northern Tigers (U17s G)	Saturday, 24 February, 12:50pm	Frank McGuren Field	Nicholas Willer
Riverina Bulls (U17s G)	6 – 74	Western Rams (U17s G)	Sunday, 25 February, 12:45pm	Laurie Daley Oval	Noah Dal Molin
North Coast Bulldogs (U17s G)	BYE	Monaro Colts (U17s G)

Round 2

Home	Score	Away	Match Information
Home	Score	Away	Date and Time	Venue	Referee	Video
North Coast Bulldogs (U17s G)	10 – 10	Northern Rivers Titans (U17s G)	Saturday, 2 March, 11:30am	Rex Hardaker Oval	Nicholas Willer
Riverina Bulls (U17s G)	4 – 64	Monaro Colts (U17s G)	Sunday, 3 March, 12:45pm	McDonalds Park	Billy Perrott
Greater Northern Tigers (U17s G)	BYE	Western Rams (U17s G)

Round 3

Home	Score	Away	Match Information
Home	Score	Away	Date and Time	Venue	Referee	Video
Greater Northern Tigers (U17s G)	20 – 0	North Coast Bulldogs (U17s G)	Saturday, 9 March, 10:30am	Scully Park	Oscar Perkins
Monaro Colts (U17s G)	16 – 22	Western Rams (U17s G)	Sunday, 10 March, 12:00pm	Les Boyd Oval	Billy Perrott
Northern Rivers Titans (U17s G)	BYE	Riverina Bulls (U17s G)

==== Finals Series ====
Home	Score	Away	Match Information
Home	Score	Away	Date and Time	Venue	Referee	Video
Grand Final
Greater Northern Tigers (U17s G)	8 – 22	Western Rams (U17s G)	Saturday, 16 March, 1:00pm	Woy Woy Oval	Callum Richardson

===== Grand Final =====
2024 Lisa Fiaola Cup Regional Grand Final

Saturday, 16 March
1:00pm (AEDT)

Greater Northern Tigers	8 – 22	Western Rams
Tries: Marlee Stewart (22') 1 Emily Dietrich (45') 1 Goals: Emily Dietrich 0/2	1st: 4 – 10; 2nd: 4 – 12	Tries: 1 (12') Grace Macgregor; 1 (16') Na'shaeya Dickinson; 1 (34') Alana O'Loughlin; 1 (54') Zakiah Jenkins; Goals: 3/4 Lara Edwards (13', 35', 55')

Woy Woy Oval, Woy Woy
Referee: Callum Richardson
Player of the Match: Alana O'Loughlin

Team lists:

FB	1	Emily Dietrich
WG	2	Marlee Stewart
CE	3	Regan Simpson
CE	4	Mia Cloake
WG	5	Mia Allen
FE	6	Sophie Greentree
HB	7	Hallie Daniels
PR	8	Ashley Hanslow
HK	9	Ava Mitchell
PR	10	Breanna Allan
SR	11	Scarlett Slade
SR	12	Ella Vidler
LK	13	Lilly-Jane Williams
Substitutes:
IC	14	Sophie Paul
IC	15	Georgia Clydsdale
IC	16	Bonii Porter
IC	17	Elizabeth Dykes
IC	18	Mackenzie Perrett
Coach:
Luke Taylor

Officials:

Callum Richardson (Referee)

Lachlan Gillies (Touch Judge)

Landon Blissett (Touch Judge)

FB	1	Sienna Sullivan
WG	2	Tamieka Clarke
CE	3	Lara Edwards
CE	4	Freya Bryant
WG	5	Samantha Hanrahan
FE	6	Millah Hutchins
HB	7	Abbey Carter
PR	8	Alana O'Loughlin (c)
HK	9	Zakiah Jenkins (c)
PR	10	Sala-Joy Camaira
SR	11	Bree Muldoon
SR	12	Na'shaeya Dickinson
LK	13	Grace Macgregor
Substitutes:
IC	14	Jayanna Dixon
IC	15	Grace Milne
IC	16	Amelia Sullivan
IC	17	Adda Craig
IC	18	Daisy Bohringer
Coach:
Kaitlyn Mason

== Under 16s ==
=== SLE Andrew Johns Cup ===
The Andrew Johns Cup is the statewide boy's under 16s competition.

==== Teams ====
===== Northern Conference =====
Colours	Club	Home ground(s)	Head coach
	Central Coast Roosters	Morry Breen Oval	TBA
	Greater Northern Tigers	Scully Park, Farrer MAHS	TBA
	Newcastle-Maitland Region Knights	Cessnock Sportsground	TBA
	North Coast Bulldogs	Port Macquarie Regional Stadium	TBA
	Northern Rivers Titans	Various	TBA

===== Southern Conference =====
Colours	Club	Home ground(s)	Head coach
	Illawarra-South Coast Dragons	Ron Costello Oval, Centenary Field	TBA
	Macarthur-Wests Tigers	Kirkham Oval	TBA
	Monaro Colts	NSWRL HQ Bruce	TBA
	Riverina Bulls	Laurie Daley Oval, McDonalds Park	TBA
	Western Rams	Various	TBA

==== Ladders ====
===== Northern Conference =====
Pos	Team	Pld	W	D	L	B	PF	PA	PD	Pts
1	Newcastle-Maitland Region Knights (U16s)	5	4	1	0	0	156	78	+78	9
2	Central Coast Roosters (U16s)	5	4	1	0	0	134	72	+62	9
3	Northern Rivers Titans (U16s)	5	2	0	3	0	104	102	+2	4
4	North Coast Bulldogs (U16s)	5	1	0	4	0	80	126	–46	2
5	Greater Northern Tigers (U16s)	5	0	0	5	0	50	166	-116	0

Updated to match(es) played on 9 March. Source:
Rules for classification: 1) points; 2) point difference; 3) points scored

====== Ladder progression ======
- Numbers highlighted in green indicate that the team finished the round inside the top 2.
- Numbers highlighted in blue indicates the team finished first on the ladder in that round.
- Numbers highlighted in red indicates the team finished last place on the ladder in that round.

Pos	Team	1	2	4	5	3
1	Newcastle-Maitland Region Knights (U16s)	2	4	8	9	9
2	Central Coast Roosters (U16s)	2	4	8	9	9
3	Northern Rivers Titans (U16s)	0	0	2	4	4
4	North Coast Bulldogs (U16s)	2	2	2	2	2
5	Greater Northern Tigers (U16s)	0	0	0	0	0

===== Southern Conference =====
Pos	Team	Pld	W	D	L	B	PF	PA	PD	Pts
1	Western Rams (U16s)	5	4	0	1	0	192	74	+118	8
2	Macarthur-Wests Tigers (U16s)	5	4	0	1	0	132	58	+74	8
3	Monaro Colts (U16s)	5	2	0	3	0	80	106	–26	4
4	Illawarra-South Coast Dragons (U16s)	5	2	0	3	0	98	152	–54	4
5	Riverina Bulls (U16s)	5	1	0	4	0	70	162	–92	2

Updated to match(es) played on 9 March. Source:
Rules for classification: 1) points; 2) point difference; 3) points scored

====== Ladder progression ======
- Numbers highlighted in green indicate that the team finished the round inside the top 2.
- Numbers highlighted in blue indicates the team finished first on the ladder in that round.
- Numbers highlighted in red indicates the team finished last place on the ladder in that round.

Pos	Team	1	2	4	5	3
1	Western Rams (U16s)	0	2	6	8	8
2	Macarthur-Wests Tigers (U16s)	2	4	6	8	8
3	Monaro Colts (U16s)	0	0	2	4	4
4	Illawarra-South Coast Dragons (U16s)	0	2	2	2	4
5	Riverina Bulls (U16s)	2	2	2	2	2

Season Results:

Round 1

Home	Score	Away	Match Information
Home	Score	Away	Date and Time	Venue	Referee	Video
Central Coast Roosters (U16s)	26 – 10	Monaro Colts (U16s)	Saturday, 3 February, 10:00am	Morry Breen Oval	Alex Le-Geyt
Northern Rivers Titans (U16s)	12 – 22	Newcastle-Maitland Region Knights (U16s)	Saturday, 3 February, 10:00am	Kingsford Smith Park	Jack Thornton
Greater Northern Tigers (U16s)	10 – 34	North Coast Bulldogs (U16s)	Saturday, 3 February, 10:00am	Scully Park	Brayden Sylvester
Illawarra-South Coast Dragons (U16s)	18 – 24	Riverina Bulls (U16s)	Sunday, 4 February, 10:00am	Ron Costello Oval	Rhianna Boag
Macarthur-Wests Tigers (U16s)	24 – 20	Western Rams (U16s)	Sunday, 4 February, 10:00am	Kirkham Oval	Will Flint

Round 2

Home	Score	Away	Match Information
Home	Score	Away	Date and Time	Venue	Referee	Video
Central Coast Roosters (U16s)	26 – 22	Northern Rivers Titans (U16s)	Saturday, 10 February, 10:00am	Morry Breen Oval	Jack Fisher
Macarthur-Wests Tigers (U16s)	24 – 2	North Coast Bulldogs (U16s)	Saturday, 10 February, 10:00am	Kirkham Oval	Will Flint
Newcastle-Maitland Region Knights (U16s)	28 – 16	Greater Northern Tigers (U16s)	Saturday, 10 February, 11:00am	Cessnock Sportsground	Rami Abu-Mansour
Western Rams (U16s)	34 – 12	Riverina Bulls (U16s)	Sunday, 11 February, 10:00am	Sid Kallas Oval	Isaac Cornell
Monaro Colts (U16s)	14 – 26	Illawarra-South Coast Dragons (U16s)	Sunday, 11 February, 12:00pm	NSWRL HQ Bruce	Rhianna Boag

Round 3

Home	Score	Away	Match Information
Home	Score	Away	Date and Time	Venue	Referee	Video
Greater Northern Tigers (U16s)	6 – 28	Central Coast Roosters (U16s)	Saturday, 17 February, 10:00am	Farrer MAHS	Brayden Silverster
North Coast Bulldogs (U16s)	14 – 38	Newcastle-Maitland Region Knights (U16s)	Saturday, 17 February, 10:00am	Port Macquarie Regional Stadium	Rami Abu-Mansour
Western Rams (U16s)	36 – 6	Monaro Colts (U16s)	Sunday, 18 February, 10:00am	Jock Colley Oval	Will Flint
Macarthur-Wests Tigers (U16s)	32 – 14	Riverina Bulls (U16s)	Sunday, 18 February, 10:00am	Kirkham Oval	Nelson Pantelis
Northern Rivers Titans (U16s)	22 – 26	Illawarra-South Coast Dragons (U16s)	Saturday, 9 March, 10:30am	Murwillumbah Leagues Club	Nicholas Willer

Round 4

Home	Score	Away	Match Information
Home	Score	Away	Date and Time	Venue	Referee	Video
Central Coast Roosters (U16s)	30 – 10	North Coast Bulldogs (U16s)	Saturday, 24 February, 10:00am	Morry Breen Oval	Jack Fisher
Northern Rivers Titans (U16s)	24 – 8	Greater Northern Tigers (U16s)	Saturday, 24 February, 10:00am	Frank McGuren Field	Brayden Silverster
Riverina Bulls (U16s)	12 – 44	Newcastle-Maitland Region Knights (U16s)	Sunday, 25 February, 10:00am	Laurie Daley Oval	Isaac Cornell
Illawarra-South Coast Dragons (U16s)	22 – 50	Western Rams (U16s)	Sunday, 25 February, 10:00am	Ron Costello Oval	Reece Sammut
Monaro Colts (U16s)	16 – 10	Macarthur-Wests Tigers (U16s)	Sunday, 25 February, 11:00am	NSWRL HQ Bruce	Nelson Pantelis

Round 5

Home	Score	Away	Match Information
Home	Score	Away	Date and Time	Venue	Referee	Video
Newcastle-Maitland Region Knights (U16s)	24 – 24	Central Coast Roosters (U16s)	Saturday, 2 March, 9:30am	Cessnock Sportsground	Reece Sammut
Western Rams (U16s)	52 – 10	Greater Northern Tigers (U16s)	Saturday, 2 March, 10:00am	Cale Oval	Brayden Silverster
Illawarra-South Coast Dragons (U16s)	6 – 42	Macarthur-Wests Tigers (U16s)	Saturday, 2 March, 10:30am	Centenary Field	Aidan Richardson
North Coast Bulldogs (U16s)	20 – 24	Northern Rivers Titans (U16s)	Sunday, 3 March, 10:00am	Port Macquarie Regional Stadium	Jacob Nelson
Riverina Bulls (U16s)	8 – 34	Monaro Colts (U16s)	Sunday, 3 March, 10:00am	McDonalds Park	Isaac Cornell

==== Finals Series ====
Semi-Finals
1N	Newcastle-Maitland Region	6
2S	Macarthur-Wests	14
1S	Western	10
2N	Central Coast	18

Grand Final
2N	Central Coast	20
2S	Macarthur-Wests	12

Home	Score	Away	Match Information
Home	Score	Away	Date and Time	Venue	Referee	Video
Semi-Finals
Western Rams (U16s)	10 – 18	Central Coast Roosters (U16s)	Saturday, 16 March, 10:00am	Woy Woy Oval	Liam Richardson
Newcastle-Maitland Region Knights (U16s)	6 – 14	Macarthur-Wests Tigers (U16s)	Sunday, 17 March, 11:00am	Pirtek Park	Jabril Daizli
Grand Final
Central Coast Roosters (U16s)	20 – 12	Macarthur-Wests Tigers (U16s)	Sunday, 24 March, 10:30am	Cessnock Sportsground	Bailey Warren

===== Grand Final =====
2024 Andrew Johns Cup Grand Final

Sunday, 24 March
10:30am (AEDT)

Central Coast Roosters	20 – 12	Macarthur-Wests Tigers
Tries: Semi Leweniqila (3') 1 Blessing Foini (24') 1 Jack Dean-Potaka (37') 1 Koby Houghton (46') 1 Goals: Owen Knowles 2/4 (5', 26')	1st: 12 – 0; 2nd: 8 – 12	Tries: 1 (54') Ronel Ribucan; 1 (56') Brock Achurch; Goals: 2/2 Joshua Vella (55', 57')

Cessnock Sportsground, Cessnock
Referee: Bailey Warren
Player of the Match: Alexander Stephenson

Team lists:

FB	1	Zaylen Ekepati
WG	2	Semi Leweniqila
CE	3	Chase Kapua
CE	4	Koby Houghton
WG	5	Isaac Philips
FE	6	Jack Dean-Potaka
HB	7	Owen Knowles
PR	8	Duncan Gatt-Smith
HK	9	Kalen Cashin
PR	10	Samuel Tracey
SR	11	Tulsyn McCullogh
SR	12	Cooper Gibbs
LK	13	Alexander Stephenson (c)
Substitutes:
IC	14	Archie Frewin
IC	15	Cooper Newton
IC	16	Blessing Foini
IC	17	Kohen Scott
Replacement:
RE	18	Tadhg Close
Coach:

Officials:

Bailey Warren (Referee)

Olivia Lawne (Touch Judge)

Bayden Silvester (Touch Judge)

FB	1	Ronel Ribucan
WG	2	Joshua Vella
CE	3	Elijah Sefo
CE	4	Dallis Taoai
WG	5	Mawin Tema Soaai
FE	6	Brock Achurch (c)
HB	7	Curtis Lakeman
PR	8	Jake Gaffney
HK	9	Elijah Mears
PR	10	Jaziyah Taiatu
SR	11	Andrew Sio
SR	12	Jermayne Faafiu
LK	13	Kye Penfold
Substitutes:
IC	14	Tyran McLean
IC	15	Markus Fonua
IC	16	Forgiveness Tila
IC	17	Benjamin Hodsdon
Replacement:
RE	18	Ruben Toga
Coach:

== Representative Matches ==
=== Country V City ===
2024 Under 19s Women Country V City

Sunday, 19 May
12:50pm (AEST)

Country	26 – 18	City
Tries: Indie Bostock (2', 21') 2 Tess McWilliams (6') 1 Lilly-Ann White (38') 1 Hope Millard (65') 1 Goals: Chelsea Savill 3/6 (8', 65', 68'p)	1st: 14 – 14; 2nd: 4 – 4 ET1: 6 – 0 ET2: 2 – 0	Tries: 2 (10', 27') Audrey Nadaya-Harb; 1 (16') Abby Aros; 1 (50') Bella McEachern; Goals: 1/3 Audrey Nadaya-Harb (17'); 0/1 Lili Boyle

Leichhardt Oval, Sydney
Referee: Rhianna Boag
Player of the Match: Manilita Takapautolo

Team lists:

FB	1	Lilly-Ann White
WG	2	Tyra Ekepati
CE	3	Mia-Rose Walsh
CE	4	Indie Bostock
WG	5	Maria Paseka
FE	6	Evie McGrath
HB	7	Kasey Reh (c)
PR	8	Hope Millard
HK	9	Chelsea Savill
PR	10	Ella Koster
SR	11	Charlotte Basham
SR	12	Tess McWilliams
LK	13	Sienna Yeo
Substitutes:
IC	14	Evie Jones
IC	15	Bronte Wilson
IC	16	Cheyenne Baker
IC	17	Makaah Darcy
Replacement:
RE	18	Herewaka Pohatu
Coach:
Courtney Crawford

Officials:

Rhianna Boag (Referee) Siobhan Wilson (Touch Judge) Indiana Manion (Touch Judge)

FB	1	Tia-Jordyn Vasilovski
WG	2	Bella McEachern
CE	3	Lindsay Tui
CE	4	Abby Aros
WG	5	Audrey Nadaya-Harb
FE	6	Raphaella Perigo
HB	7	Ambryn Murphy-Haua
PR	8	Manilita Takapautolo
HK	9	Waimarie Martin
PR	10	Claudia Brown (c)
SR	11	Ryvrr-Lee Alo
SR	12	Evah McEwen
LK	13	Pauline Suli-Ruka
Substitutes:
IC	14	Rory Muller
IC	15	Taneisha Gray
IC	16	Oriana Epati
IC	17	Lili Boyle
Replacement:
RE	18	Kayla Henderson
Coach:
Karen Stuart

2024 Under 18s Country V City

Saturday, 18 May
12:35pm (AEST)

Country	v	City

Leichhardt Oval, Sydney

Team lists:

FB	1
WG	2
CE	3
CE	4
WG	5
FE	6
HB	7
PR	8
HK	9
PR	10
SR	11
SR	12
LK	13
Substitutes:
IC	14
IC	15
IC	16
IC	17
Coach:

Officials:

FB	1
WG	2
CE	3
CE	4
WG	5
FE	6
HB	7
PR	8
HK	9
PR	10
SR	11
SR	12
LK	13
Substitutes:
IC	14
IC	15
IC	16
IC	17
Coach:

2024 Under 17s Girls Country V City

Sunday, 19 May
11:15am (AEST)

Country	v	City

Leichhardt Oval, Sydney

Team lists:

FB	1
WG	2
CE	3
CE	4
WG	5
FE	6
HB	7
PR	8
HK	9
PR	10
SR	11
SR	12
LK	13
Substitutes:
IC	14
IC	15
IC	16
IC	17
Coach:

Officials:

FB	1
WG	2
CE	3
CE	4
WG	5
FE	6
HB	7
PR	8
HK	9
PR	10
SR	11
SR	12
LK	13
Substitutes:
IC	14
IC	15
IC	16
IC	17
Coach:

2024 Under 16s Country V City

Saturday, 18 May
11:00am (AEST)

Country	v	City

Leichhardt Oval, Sydney

Team lists:

FB	1
WG	2
CE	3
CE	4
WG	5
FE	6
HB	7
PR	8
HK	9
PR	10
SR	11
SR	12
LK	13
Substitutes:
IC	14
IC	15
IC	16
IC	17
Coach:

Officials:

FB	1
WG	2
CE	3
CE	4
WG	5
FE	6
HB	7
PR	8
HK	9
PR	10
SR	11
SR	12
LK	13
Substitutes:
IC	14
IC	15
IC	16
IC	17
Coach:
