= Baddeley Park =

Sports stadium in Cessnock, New South Wales

Coordinates: 32°50′58″S 151°21′14″E

Baddeley Park is a sports stadium in Cessnock, New South Wales, Australia and is part of Baddeley Park Regional Sporting Centre.
